= List of moths of Australia (Blastobasidae) =

Partial list of Australian moths

This is a list of the Australian species of the family Blastobasidae. It also acts as an index to the species articles and forms part of the full List of moths of Australia.

These species are usually found in the warmer and wetter parts of Australia. There are no known species from the arid zone. The larvae feed on plant detritus. Larvae have been recorded feeding on old cones of kauri pines and in the old flower spikes and young fruit of palms.

- Blastobasis anthoptera Lower, 1907
- Blastobasis homadelpha Meyrick, 1902
- Blastobasis incuriosa Meyrick, 1916
- Blastobasis leucotoxa Meyrick, 1902
- Blastobasis adustella Walsingham, 1894
- Blastobasis monozona Lower, 1907
- Blastobasis nephelias Meyrick, 1902
- Blastobasis pallescens Turner, 1947
- Blastobasis pentasticta Turner, 1947
- Blastobasis phaeopasta Turner, 1947
- Blastobasis scotia Turner, 1947
- Blastobasis tanyptera Turner, 1947
- Blastobasis tarda Meyrick, 1902
