= Blastobasis glauconotata =

Scientific classification
- Kingdom: Animalia
- Phylum: Arthropoda
- Clade: Pancrustacea
- Class: Insecta
- Order: Lepidoptera
- Family: Blastobasidae
- Genus: Blastobasis
- Species: B. glauconotata

Binomial name
- Blastobasis glauconotata Adamski, 2010

Species of moth in genus Blastobasis

Blastobasis glauconotata is a moth in the family Blastobasidae. It is found in Kenya, where it is known from the central and western highlands and in the central mid-altitudes of the Ngaia Forest.

The length of the forewings is 6.8–9.1 mm.

The larvae feed on Afrocarpus falcatus, Chaetacme aristata, Cussonia spicata, Drypetes gerrardii, Elaeodendron buchananii, Ekebergia capensis, Mimusops kummel, Prunus africana, Rawsonia lucida, Schrebera alata, Solanum anguivi, Stychnos mitis, Toddalia asiatica, Vepris nobilis, Vepris simplicifolia, Vepris trichocarpa and Warburgia ugandensis.
