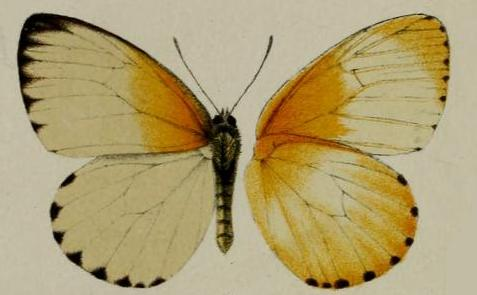
- A. s. nyasana

Scientific classification
- Kingdom: Animalia
- Phylum: Arthropoda
- Clade: Pancrustacea
- Class: Insecta
- Order: Lepidoptera
- Family: Pieridae
- Genus: Appias
- Species: A. sylvia

Binomial name
- Appias sylvia (Fabricius, 1775)

Synonyms
- Papilio sylvia Fabricius, 1775; Appias (Glutophrissa) sylvia; Papilio eudoxia Cramer, 1782; Pieris rhodanus Ward, 1871; Appias bachi Suffert, 1904; Appias rhodope dopero Suffert, 1904; Appias rhodope ab. rhodopiana Strand, 1913; Appias rhodope var. tenuifascia Neustetter, 1926; Phrissura nyasana Butler, 1897; Appias rhodope f. luvuensis Joicey and Talbot, 1927; Appias perlucens f. masabae Stoneham, 1957; Appias sylvia luvuensis f. xerophyla Berger, 1981

= Appias sylvia =

Species of butterfly

Appias sylvia, the woodland albatross white or common albatross, is a butterfly in the family Pieridae. It is found in Senegal, Gambia, Guinea, Sierra Leone, Liberia, Ivory Coast, Ghana, Togo, Benin, Nigeria, Equatorial Guinea (Bioko), Cameroon, the Republic of the Congo, the Central African Republic, the Democratic Republic of the Congo, Sudan, Ethiopia, Angola, Namibia, Zambia, Kenya, Uganda, Tanzania and Malawi. The habitat consists of forests.

Males come to damp patches and both sexes are attracted to flowers.

The larvae feed on Drypetes (including Drypetes ugandensis and Drypetes gerrardii), Phyllanthus and Ritchiea species.

== Subspecies ==
- A. s. sylvia (Senegal, Gambia, Guinea, Sierra Leone, Liberia, Ivory Coast, Ghana, Togo, Benin, southern Nigeria, Bioko, Cameroon, Congo, Central African Republic, northern Democratic Republic of the Congo)
- A. s. abyssinica Talbot, 1932 (south-western Ethiopia)
- A. s. nyasana (Butler, 1897) (Democratic Republic of the Congo, north-eastern Namibia, north-eastern Zambia, western Kenya, Uganda, Tanzania, Malawi)
- A. s. sudanensis Talbot, 1932 (southern Sudan)
- A. s. zairiensis Berger, 1981 (Democratic Republic of the Congo)

Torben Larsen developed a species numbering system for his 2005 publication Butterflies of West Africa. The nominate subspecies is #84. The 'Larsen' numbers have since been used with permission in A Sharp Eye on Butterflies of Ghana.
