= Blastobasis acirfa =

Scientific classification
- Kingdom: Animalia
- Phylum: Arthropoda
- Clade: Pancrustacea
- Class: Insecta
- Order: Lepidoptera
- Family: Blastobasidae
- Genus: Blastobasis
- Species: B. acirfa

Binomial name
- Blastobasis acirfa Adamski, 2010

Species of moth in genus Blastobasis

Blastobasis acirfa is a moth in the family Blastobasidae. It is found in Kenya. The habitat consists of coastal lowlands and the western highlands.

The length of the forewings is 5.9–9.3 mm.

The larvae feed on Manilkara butugi, Mimusops bagshawei, Olea welwitschii, Olea woodiana disjuncta, Prunus africana, Synsepalum cerasiferum, and Tiliacora funifera.
