= Blastobasis aynekiella =

Scientific classification
- Kingdom: Animalia
- Phylum: Arthropoda
- Clade: Pancrustacea
- Class: Insecta
- Order: Lepidoptera
- Family: Blastobasidae
- Genus: Blastobasis
- Species: B. aynekiella

Binomial name
- Blastobasis aynekiella Adamski, 2010

Species of moth in genus Blastobasis

Blastobasis aynekiella is a moth in the family Blastobasidae. It is found in Kenya. The habitat consists of the western highlands of the Kakamega Forest.

The length of the forewings is 6.9–8.3 mm.

The larvae feed on Chrysophyllum albidum, Mimusops bagshawei, Olea welwitschii, Prunus africana and Tiliacora funifera.
