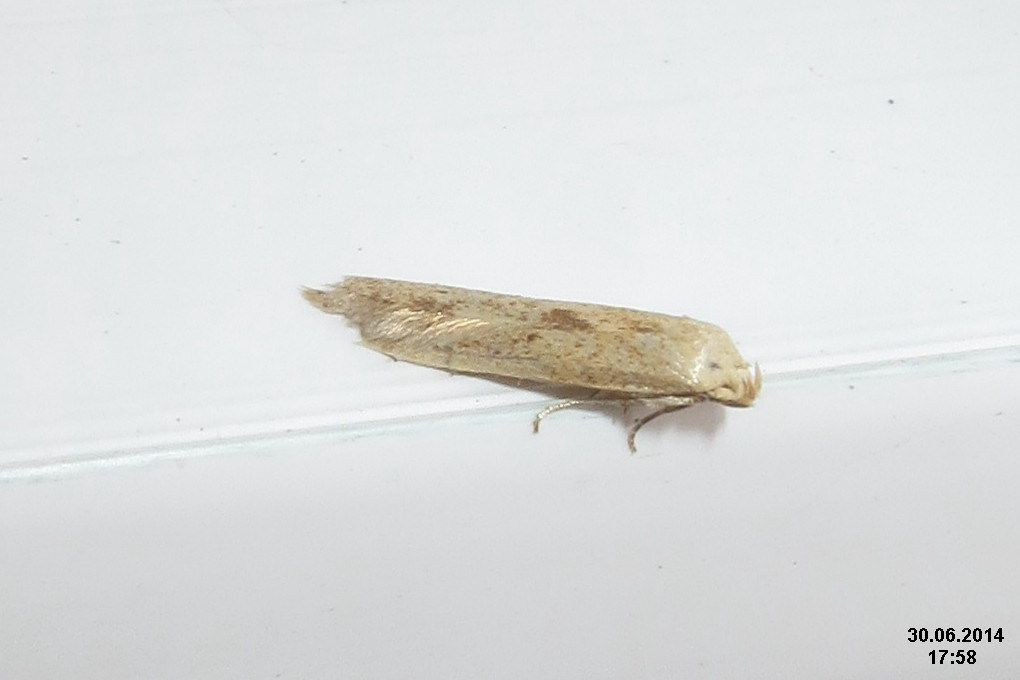

Scientific classification
- Kingdom: Animalia
- Phylum: Arthropoda
- Clade: Pancrustacea
- Class: Insecta
- Order: Lepidoptera
- Family: Blastobasidae
- Genus: Blastobasis
- Species: B. decolorella

Binomial name
- Blastobasis decolorella (Wollaston, 1858)

Synonyms
- Laverna decolorella Wollaston, 1858

= Blastobasis decolorella =

Species of moth in genus Blastobasis

Blastobasis decolorella is a moth in the family Blastobasidae. It is found on Madeira and in Portugal. Records from England and possibly also the Netherlands are based on misidentifications of Blastobasis lacticolella.
