= Blastobasis chuka =

Scientific classification
- Kingdom: Animalia
- Phylum: Arthropoda
- Clade: Pancrustacea
- Class: Insecta
- Order: Lepidoptera
- Family: Blastobasidae
- Genus: Blastobasis
- Species: B. chuka

Binomial name
- Blastobasis chuka Adamski, 2010

Species of moth in genus Blastobasis

Blastobasis chuka is a moth in the family Blastobasidae. It is found in Kenya, where it is known from the south-eastern coast and the central highlands.

The length of the forewings is 6.3–8.2 mm.

The larvae feed on the fruit of Allophylus abyssinicus, Chrysophyllum gorungosanum, Dictyophleba lucida, Diphasia species, Drypetes gerrardii, Flacourtia indica, Garcinia volkensii, Landolphia buchananii, Passiflora mollisima, Podocarpus milanjianus, Prunus africana, Rawsonia lucida and Vepris simplicifolia.

== Etymology ==
The species epithet, chuka, refers to the Chuka Forest, the type locality.
