= Blastobasis semilutea =

Scientific classification
- Kingdom: Animalia
- Phylum: Arthropoda
- Clade: Pancrustacea
- Class: Insecta
- Order: Lepidoptera
- Family: Blastobasidae
- Genus: Blastobasis
- Species: B. semilutea

Binomial name
- Blastobasis semilutea Meyrick, 1916

Species of moth in genus Blastobasis

Blastobasis semilutea is a moth in the family Blastobasidae. It was described by Edward Meyrick in 1916. It is found in southern India.
