= Blastobasis fatigata =

Scientific classification
- Kingdom: Animalia
- Phylum: Arthropoda
- Clade: Pancrustacea
- Class: Insecta
- Order: Lepidoptera
- Family: Blastobasidae
- Genus: Blastobasis
- Species: B. fatigata

Binomial name
- Blastobasis fatigata Meyrick, 1914

Species of moth in genus Blastobasis

Blastobasis fatigata is a moth in the family Blastobasidae. It is found in South Africa.

The length of the forewings is 6 mm.
