= Blastobasis lavernella =

Scientific classification
- Kingdom: Animalia
- Phylum: Arthropoda
- Clade: Pancrustacea
- Class: Insecta
- Order: Lepidoptera
- Family: Blastobasidae
- Genus: Blastobasis
- Species: B. lavernella

Binomial name
- Blastobasis lavernella Walsingham, 1894

Species of moth in genus Blastobasis

Blastobasis lavernella is a moth in the family Blastobasidae. It is found on Madeira and in Spain.

The wingspan is 15–16 mm. The forewings are ochreous mixed with reddish-ochreous mottlings and shaded with patches of greyish brown. The hindwings are shining pale stramineous (straw coloured).
