= Blastobasis lecaniella =

Scientific classification
- Kingdom: Animalia
- Phylum: Arthropoda
- Clade: Pancrustacea
- Class: Insecta
- Order: Lepidoptera
- Family: Blastobasidae
- Genus: Blastobasis
- Species: B. lecaniella

Binomial name
- Blastobasis lecaniella Busck, 1913

Species of moth in genus Blastobasis

Blastobasis lecaniella is a moth in the family Blastobasidae. It was described by August Busck in 1913. It is found in Guyana.
