= Blastobasis byrsodepta =

Scientific classification
- Kingdom: Animalia
- Phylum: Arthropoda
- Clade: Pancrustacea
- Class: Insecta
- Order: Lepidoptera
- Family: Blastobasidae
- Genus: Blastobasis
- Species: B. byrsodepta

Binomial name
- Blastobasis byrsodepta Meyrick, 1913

Species of moth in genus Blastobasis

Blastobasis byrsodepta is a moth in the family Blastobasidae. It is found in South Africa and the Democratic Republic of Congo.

The length of the forewings is 6–7 mm.

The larvae have been recorded feeding on Ficus species.
