= Blastobasis crassifica =

Scientific classification
- Kingdom: Animalia
- Phylum: Arthropoda
- Clade: Pancrustacea
- Class: Insecta
- Order: Lepidoptera
- Family: Blastobasidae
- Genus: Blastobasis
- Species: B. crassifica

Binomial name
- Blastobasis crassifica Meyrick, 1916

Synonyms
- Lateantenna crassifica (Meyrick, 1916)

Species of moth in genus Blastobasis

Blastobasis crassifica is a moth in the family Blastobasidae. It was described by Edward Meyrick in 1916. It is found in Bengal and Sri Lanka.

The larvae have been recorded feeding on Crotalaria juncea.
