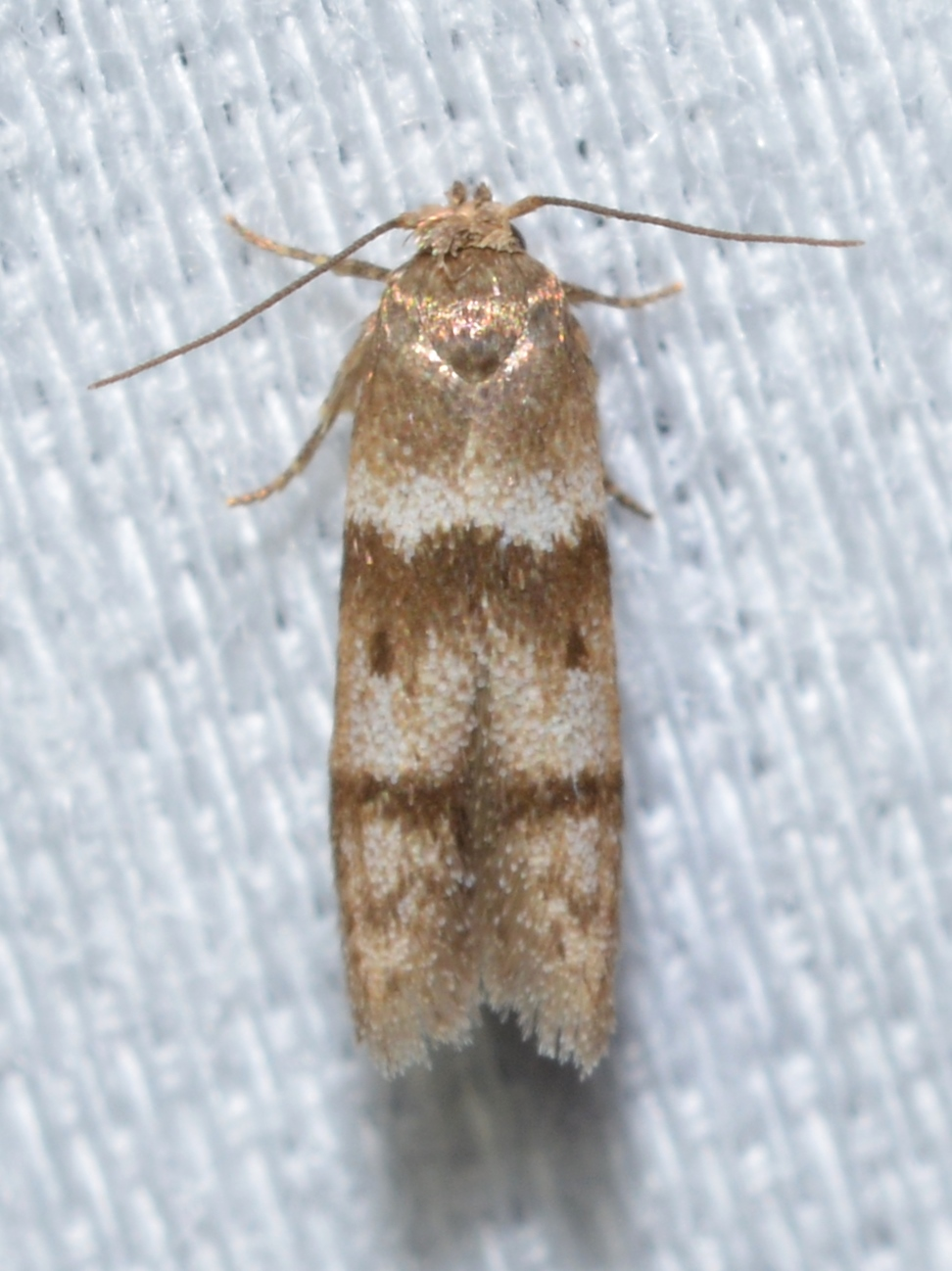
- Cuivre River State Park Troy Missouri

Scientific classification
- Kingdom: Animalia
- Phylum: Arthropoda
- Clade: Pancrustacea
- Class: Insecta
- Order: Lepidoptera
- Family: Blastobasidae
- Genus: Blastobasis
- Species: B. pulchella

Binomial name
- Blastobasis pulchella (Dietz, 1910)

Synonyms
- Euresia pulchella Dietz, 1910; Blastobasis pulebella; Blastobasis maritimella McDunnough, 1961

= Blastobasis pulchella =

Species of moth in genus Blastobasis

Blastobasis pulchella is a moth in the family Blastobasidae. It is found in North America, including Nova Scotia, Washington DC and Maine.
