= Blastobasis evanescens =

Scientific classification
- Kingdom: Animalia
- Phylum: Arthropoda
- Clade: Pancrustacea
- Class: Insecta
- Order: Lepidoptera
- Family: Blastobasidae
- Genus: Blastobasis
- Species: B. evanescens

Binomial name
- Blastobasis evanescens (Walsingham, 1901)

Synonyms
- Agnoea evanescens Walsingham, 1901

Species of moth in genus Blastobasis

Blastobasis evanescens is a moth in the family Blastobasidae. It was described by Walsingham in 1901. It is found on Corsica.
