= Blastobasis aedes =

Scientific classification
- Kingdom: Animalia
- Phylum: Arthropoda
- Clade: Pancrustacea
- Class: Insecta
- Order: Lepidoptera
- Family: Blastobasidae
- Genus: Blastobasis
- Species: B. aedes

Binomial name
- Blastobasis aedes Adamski, 2013

Species of moth in genus Blastobasis

Blastobasis aedes is a moth in the family Blastobasidae. It is found in Costa Rica.

The length of the forewings is 4.9–6.8 mm.

== Etymology ==
The specific name is derived from Latin aedes (meaning a building).
