= Blastobasis transcripta =

Scientific classification
- Kingdom: Animalia
- Phylum: Arthropoda
- Clade: Pancrustacea
- Class: Insecta
- Order: Lepidoptera
- Family: Blastobasidae
- Genus: Blastobasis
- Species: B. transcripta

Binomial name
- Blastobasis transcripta Meyrick, 1918

Species of moth in genus Blastobasis

Blastobasis transcripta is a moth in the family Blastobasidae. It is found in India. The larvae have been recorded feeding within the twigs of Pinus longifolia.
