= Blastobasis xiphiae =

Scientific classification
- Kingdom: Animalia
- Phylum: Arthropoda
- Clade: Pancrustacea
- Class: Insecta
- Order: Lepidoptera
- Family: Blastobasidae
- Genus: Blastobasis
- Species: B. xiphiae

Binomial name
- Blastobasis xiphiae Adamski, 2013

Species of moth in genus Blastobasis

Blastobasis xiphiae is a moth in the family Blastobasidae. It is found in Costa Rica.

The length of the forewings is 4.5–5.2 mm.

== Etymology ==
The specific epithet is derived from Latin xiphias (meaning swordfish).
