= Blastobasis divisus =

Scientific classification
- Kingdom: Animalia
- Phylum: Arthropoda
- Clade: Pancrustacea
- Class: Insecta
- Order: Lepidoptera
- Family: Blastobasidae
- Genus: Blastobasis
- Species: B. divisus

Binomial name
- Blastobasis divisus (Walsingham, 1894)

Synonyms
- Epistetus divisus Walsingham, 1894

Species of moth in genus Blastobasis

Blastobasis divisus is a moth in the family Blastobasidae. It is found on Madeira.

The wingspan is 12–17 mm. The forewings are shiny bronzy-brown with a slightly waved narrow whitish line. The outer half of the wing is slightly paler than the base. The hindwings are bronzy-grey.
