= Blastobasis catappaella =

Scientific classification
- Kingdom: Animalia
- Phylum: Arthropoda
- Clade: Pancrustacea
- Class: Insecta
- Order: Lepidoptera
- Family: Blastobasidae
- Genus: Blastobasis
- Species: B. catappaella

Binomial name
- Blastobasis catappaella Adamski, 2010

Species of moth in genus Blastobasis

Blastobasis catappaella is a moth in the family Blastobasidae. It is found in Kenya. The habitat consists of the coastal areas and xeric highlands.

The length of the forewings is 4 mm.
