= Blastobasis elgonae =

Scientific classification
- Kingdom: Animalia
- Phylum: Arthropoda
- Clade: Pancrustacea
- Class: Insecta
- Order: Lepidoptera
- Family: Blastobasidae
- Genus: Blastobasis
- Species: B. elgonae

Binomial name
- Blastobasis elgonae Adamski, 2010

Species of moth in genus Blastobasis

Blastobasis elgonae is a moth in the family Blastobasidae. It is found in Kenya, where it is known from Mount Elgon in the western highlands.

The length of the forewings is 6.8 mm.
