= Blastobasis millicentae =

Scientific classification
- Kingdom: Animalia
- Phylum: Arthropoda
- Clade: Pancrustacea
- Class: Insecta
- Order: Lepidoptera
- Family: Blastobasidae
- Genus: Blastobasis
- Species: B. millicentae

Binomial name
- Blastobasis millicentae Adamski, 2010

Species of moth in genus Blastobasis

Blastobasis millicentae is a moth in the family Blastobasidae. It is found in south-eastern Kenya and South Africa. The habitat consists of coastal lowlands.

The length of the forewings is 4.1–4.5 mm.
