= Blastobasis leucozyga =

Scientific classification
- Kingdom: Animalia
- Phylum: Arthropoda
- Clade: Pancrustacea
- Class: Insecta
- Order: Lepidoptera
- Family: Blastobasidae
- Genus: Blastobasis
- Species: B. leucozyga

Binomial name
- Blastobasis leucozyga Meyrick, 1936

Species of moth in genus Blastobasis

Blastobasis leucozyga is a moth in the family Blastobasidae. It was described by Edward Meyrick in 1936. It is found in Venezuela.
