= Blastobasis indirecta =

Scientific classification
- Kingdom: Animalia
- Phylum: Arthropoda
- Clade: Pancrustacea
- Class: Insecta
- Order: Lepidoptera
- Family: Blastobasidae
- Genus: Blastobasis
- Species: B. indirecta

Binomial name
- Blastobasis indirecta Meyrick, 1935

Species of moth in genus Blastobasis

Blastobasis indirecta is a moth in the family Blastobasidae. It was described by Edward Meyrick in 1935. It is endemic to Taiwan.
