= Blastobasis dicionis =

Scientific classification
- Kingdom: Animalia
- Phylum: Arthropoda
- Clade: Pancrustacea
- Class: Insecta
- Order: Lepidoptera
- Family: Blastobasidae
- Genus: Blastobasis
- Species: B. dicionis

Binomial name
- Blastobasis dicionis Adamski, 2013

Species of moth in genus Blastobasis

Blastobasis dicionis is a moth in the family Blastobasidae. It is found in Costa Rica. Its forewings are 5–7 mm long and are brownish-grey intermixed with brownish-grey scales tipped with pale brownish-grey and pale brownish-grey scales.
