= Blastobasis eridryas =

Scientific classification
- Kingdom: Animalia
- Phylum: Arthropoda
- Clade: Pancrustacea
- Class: Insecta
- Order: Lepidoptera
- Family: Blastobasidae
- Genus: Blastobasis
- Species: B. eridryas

Binomial name
- Blastobasis eridryas Meyrick, 1932

Species of moth in genus Blastobasis

Blastobasis eridryas is a moth in the family Blastobasidae. It is found in Ethiopia.

The length of the forewings is 8 mm. The forewings are pale brownish yellow intermixed with a few brownish red scales tipped with pale greyish yellow on the basal two-thirds. On the distal one-third consists of brownish red scales tipped with pale greyish yellow intermixed with brown scales tipped with pale greyish yellow and a few pale greyish yellow scales. The hindwings are pale grey.
