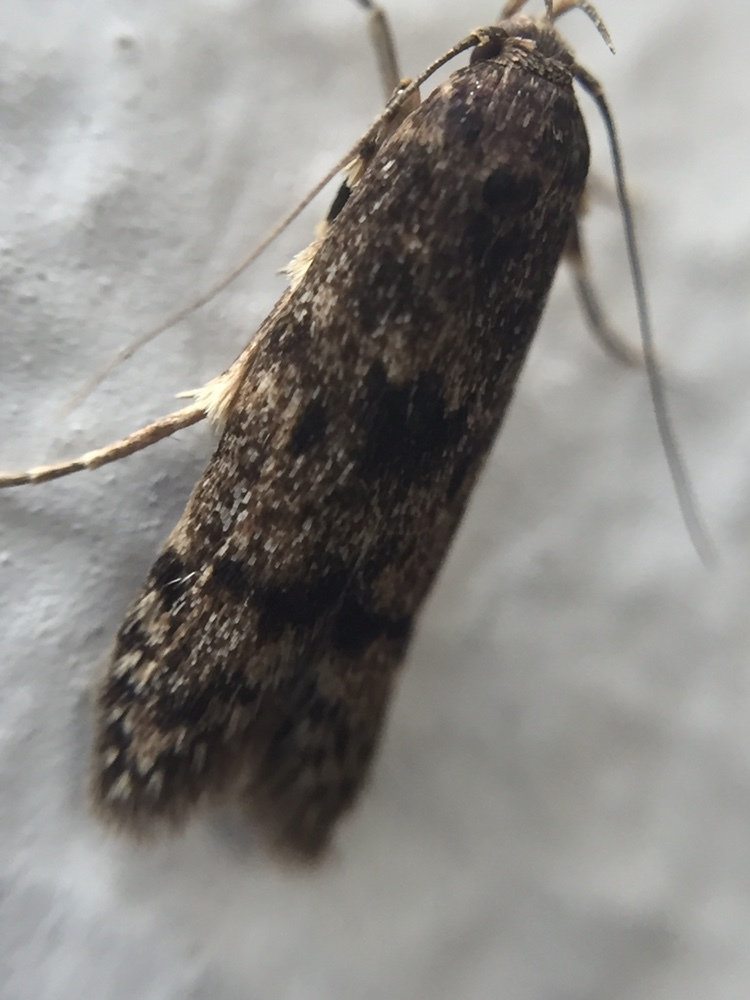

Scientific classification
- Kingdom: Animalia
- Phylum: Arthropoda
- Clade: Pancrustacea
- Class: Insecta
- Order: Lepidoptera
- Family: Blastobasidae
- Genus: Blastobasis
- Species: B. marmorosella

Binomial name
- Blastobasis marmorosella (Wollaston, 1858)

Synonyms
- Oecophora marmorosella Wollaston, 1858; Oecophora fuscomaculella Ragonot, 1879; Blastobasis fuscomaculella (Ragonot, 1879); Oecophora seeboldiella Kreithner, 1881

= Blastobasis marmorosella =

Species of moth in genus Blastobasis

Blastobasis marmorosella is a moth in the family Blastobasidae. It is found on the Canary Islands, Madeira and in Portugal and Spain. This species has been accidentally introduced to Australia and New Zealand.

== Taxonomy ==
This species was first described by Thomas Vernon Wollaston in 1858 and named Oecophora marmorosella. In 1892 Hans Rebel placed this species within the genus Blastobasis. In 2004 this species was reviewed. The female lectotype, collected in Madeira, is held in the Natural History Museum, London.

== Description ==
This species was described in 2004 by Ole Karsholt and Sergey Yu Sinev as follows:

Wingspan 16-23 mm. Head and scape of antenna light brown mottled with dark brown; flagellum dark brown, indistinctly lighter ringed, with deep basal notch in male. Labial palpi long and slender; segment 2 yellowish mottled with brown; segment 3 as long as segment 2, brown mottled with blackish. Thorax and tegulae dark grey brown. Forewing relatively broad with somewhat pointed apex, light brown mottled with dark brown and fuscous, base and basal part of dorsum blackish brown; a blackish patch at dorsum at 1/3, continuing as a fascia to costa; a blackish spot between this and base and one such spot between the blackish fascia and a double black spot at 4/5; indistinct black spots along termen from subapical to tornal spots; fringes light brownish grey. Hindwing rather broad, apically somewhat rounded, grey with light brown-grey fringes.

== Distribution ==
This species is likely indigenous to Madeira and Porto Santo. It was first recorded in New Zealand in 1988 and in the 19 years since that first record only eight specimens have been collected.
