= Blastobasis decolor =

Scientific classification
- Kingdom: Animalia
- Phylum: Arthropoda
- Clade: Pancrustacea
- Class: Insecta
- Order: Lepidoptera
- Family: Blastobasidae
- Genus: Blastobasis
- Species: B. decolor

Binomial name
- Blastobasis decolor Meyrick, 1907

Synonyms
- Lateantenna decolor (Meyrick, 1907)

Species of moth in genus Blastobasis

Blastobasis decolor is a moth in the family Blastobasidae. It was described by Edward Meyrick in 1907. It is found in Sri Lanka.
