= Blastobasis proagorella =

Scientific classification
- Kingdom: Animalia
- Phylum: Arthropoda
- Clade: Pancrustacea
- Class: Insecta
- Order: Lepidoptera
- Family: Blastobasidae
- Genus: Blastobasis
- Species: B. proagorella

Binomial name
- Blastobasis proagorella Zeller, 1877

Species of moth in genus Blastobasis

Blastobasis proagorella is a moth in the family Blastobasidae. It was described by Zeller in 1877. It is found in Colombia.
