= Blastobasis confamulella =

Scientific classification
- Kingdom: Animalia
- Phylum: Arthropoda
- Clade: Pancrustacea
- Class: Insecta
- Order: Lepidoptera
- Family: Blastobasidae
- Genus: Blastobasis
- Species: B. confamulella

Binomial name
- Blastobasis confamulella (Heinrich, 1921)

Synonyms
- Holcocera confamulella Heinrich, 1921

Species of moth in genus Blastobasis

Blastobasis confamulella is a moth in the family Blastobasidae. It is found in the United States, including Texas.
