= Blastobasis rebeli =

Marsh dowd moth

Scientific classification
- Kingdom: Animalia
- Phylum: Arthropoda
- Clade: Pancrustacea
- Class: Insecta
- Order: Lepidoptera
- Family: Blastobasidae
- Genus: Blastobasis
- Species: B. rebeli

Binomial name
- Blastobasis rebeli Sinev & Karsholt, 2004

Species of moth in genus Blastobasis

Blastobasis rebeli, the marsh dowd moth, is a moth in the family Blastobasidae found on Madeira. It was first recorded from Hampshire, Great Britain in 1998 and there have been subsequent records from the same area and nearby, as well as in West Sussex.

The wingspan is about 13 mm and the early stages are not yet described.
