= Blastobasis orithyia =

Scientific classification
- Kingdom: Animalia
- Phylum: Arthropoda
- Clade: Pancrustacea
- Class: Insecta
- Order: Lepidoptera
- Family: Blastobasidae
- Genus: Blastobasis
- Species: B. orithyia

Binomial name
- Blastobasis orithyia Adamski, 2013

Species of moth in genus Blastobasis

Blastobasis orithyia is a moth in the family Blastobasidae. It is found in Costa Rica.

The length of the forewings is 5–5.3 mm.

== Etymology ==
The specific epithet refers to Orithyia, daughter of Erechtheus, a king of Athens.
