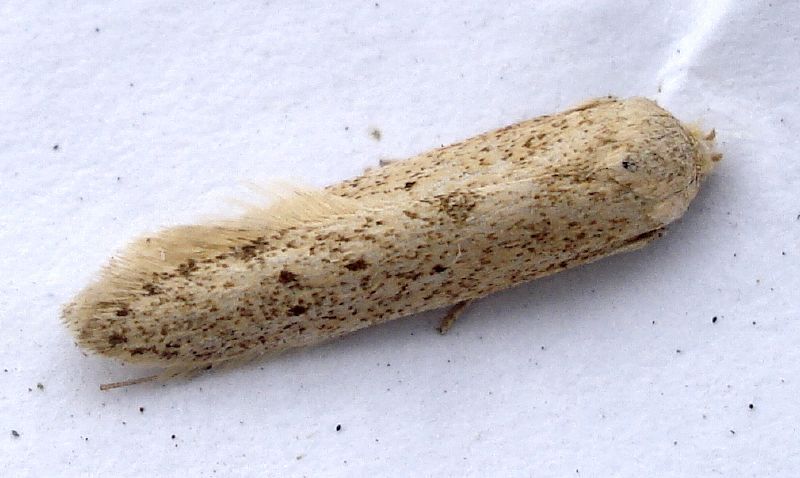
- Resting adult of B. lacticolella from Lincolnshire (UK)

Scientific classification
- Kingdom: Animalia
- Phylum: Arthropoda
- Clade: Pancrustacea
- Class: Insecta
- Order: Lepidoptera
- Family: Blastobasidae
- Subfamily: Blastobasinae
- Tribe: Blastobasini
- Genus: Blastobasis; Zeller, 1855

Type species
- Oecophora phycidella Zeller, 1839

Species
- Numerous, see text

Synonyms
- Epistetus Walsingham, 1894; Ploeophora Walsingham & Durrant, 1909 (unjustified emendation); Ploiophora W.G.Dietz, 1900; Prosthesis Walsingham, 1908 Xenodochium T.B. Fletcher, 1929; Euresia Dietz, 1910; Zenodochium Walsingham, 1908 (disputed)

= Blastobasis =

Type genus of moth family Blastobasidae

Blastobasis is the type genus of the gelechioid moth family Blastobasidae; in some arrangements these are placed in the case-bearer family (Coleophoridae) as a subfamily. Within the Blastobasidae, the subfamily Blastobasinae (or tribe Blastobasini, if united with the concealer moths) has been established to distinguish the Blastobasis lineage from the group around Holcocera, but the delimitation is not yet well-resolved.

The monophyly of this genus – the largest of its family, containing at present about half the described Blastobasidae species – is seriously in doubt. Many presumed relatives have been separated in small or even monotypic genera, which may actually represent specialized lineages within the Blastobasis assemblage. On the other hand, some formerly-independent genera are usually included in Blastobasis at the moment. Agnoea, Auximobasis, Euresia and Zenodochium are sometimes included here but considered distinct by other authors.

== Species ==
Species of Blastobasis include:

- Blastobasis abollae
- Blastobasis acarta Meyrick, 1911
- Blastobasis achaea
- Blastobasis acirfa Adamski, 2010
- Blastobasis adustella
- Blastobasis aedes
- Blastobasis aequivoca Meyrick, 1922
- Blastobasis albidella Rebel, 1928
- Blastobasis anachasta Meyrick, 1931
- Blastobasis anthoptera
- Blastobasis aphanes Zeller, 1877
- Blastobasis aphilodes Meyrick, 1918
- Blastobasis argillacea Walsingham, 1897
- Blastobasis athymopa Meyrick, 1932
- Blastobasis atlantella Zerny, 1935
- Blastobasis atmosema Meyrick, 1930
- Blastobasis atmozona Meyrick, 1939
- Blastobasis aynekiella Adamski, 2010
- Blastobasis babae
- Blastobasis balucis
- Blastobasis basipectenella
- Blastobasis bassii Sinev & Karsholt, 2004
- Blastobasis beo
- Blastobasis bilineatella Lucas, 1956
- Blastobasis bispinaella
- Blastobasis bromeliae (Walsingham, 1912)
- Blastobasis byrsodepta Meyrick, 1913
- Blastobasis caetrae
- Blastobasis candidata Meyrick, 1922
- Blastobasis catappaella Adamski, 2010
- Blastobasis centralasiae Sinev, 2007
- Blastobasis chanes
- Blastobasis chloroptris Meyrick, 1931
- Blastobasis christou
- Blastobasis chuka Adamski, 2010
- Blastobasis cineracella Amsel, 1953
- Blastobasis coffeaella
- Blastobasis commendata Meyrick, 1922
- Blastobasis confamulella
- Blastobasis confectella
- Blastobasis controversella Zeller, 1877
- Blastobasis cophodes Meyrick, 1918
- Blastobasis crassifica Meyrick, 1916
- Blastobasis crypsimorpha Meyrick, 1922
- Blastobasis curta Meyrick, 1916
- Blastobasis custodis
- Blastobasis dapis
- Blastobasis deae
- Blastobasis decolor Meyrick, 1907
- Blastobasis decolorella Wollaston, 1858
- Blastobasis deliciolarum
- Blastobasis desertarum (Wollaston, 1858)
- Blastobasis determinata Meyrick, 1921
- Blastobasis dicionis
- Blastobasis divisus (Walsingham, 1894)
- Blastobasis drymosa Adamski & Li, 2010
- Blastobasis dyssema Turner, 1918
- Blastobasis echus
- Blastobasis egens Meyrick, 1918
- Blastobasis elgonae Adamski, 2010
- Blastobasis episema Turner, 1918
- Blastobasis erae
- Blastobasis ergastulella Zeller, 1877
- Blastobasis eridryas Meyrick, 1932
- Blastobasis evanescens Walsingham, 1901
- Blastobasis exclusa (Walsingham, 1908)
- Blastobasis fatigata Meyrick, 1914
- Blastobasis fax
- Blastobasis floridella
- Blastobasis furtivus
- Blastobasis fuscomaculella Ragonot, 1879
- Blastobasis glandulella – "acorn moth"
- Blastobasis glauconotata Adamski, 2010
- Blastobasis gracilis Walsingham, 1897
- Blastobasis graminea
- Blastobasis grenadensis Walsingham, 1897
- Blastobasis helleri Rebel, 1910
- Blastobasis homadelpha
- Blastobasis huemeri Sinev, 1994
- Blastobasis ianella
- Blastobasis inana
- Blastobasis incuriosa
- Blastobasis inderskella Caradja, 1920
- Blastobasis indigesta Meyrick, 1931
- Blastobasis indirecta Meyrick, 1935
- Blastobasis industria Meyrick, 1913
- Blastobasis inouei Moriuti, 1987
- Blastobasis insularis (Wollaston, 1858)
- Blastobasis intrepida Meyrick, 1911
- Blastobasis invigorata (Meyrick, 1932)
- Blastobasis iuanae
- Blastobasis kenya Adamski, 2010
- Blastobasis lacticolella
- Blastobasis laurisilvae Sinev & Karsholt, 2004
- Blastobasis lavernella Walsingham, 1894
- Blastobasis lecaniella Busck, 1913
- Blastobasis legrandi Adamski, 1995
- Blastobasis leucogonia Zeller, 1877
- Blastobasis leucotoxa
- Blastobasis leucozyga Meyrick, 1936
- Blastobasis lex
- Blastobasis litis
- Blastobasis lososi
- Blastobasis luteella Sinev & Karsholt, 2004
- Blastobasis lutiflua Meyrick, 1922
- Blastobasis lygdi
- Blastobasis magna Amsel, 1952
- Blastobasis manto
- Blastobasis marmorosella (Wollaston, 1858)
- Blastobasis maroccanella Amsel, 1952
- Blastobasis millicentae Adamski, 2010
- Blastobasis mnemosynella Millière, 1876
- Blastobasis moffetti
- Blastobasis molinda
- Blastobasis monozona
- Blastobasis mpala Adamski, 2010
- Blastobasis murcyae
- Blastobasis neniae
- Blastobasis neozona Meyrick, 1918
- Blastobasis nephelias
- Blastobasis nephelophaea Meyrick, 1931
- Blastobasis neptes (Walsingham, 1912)
- Blastobasis nigromaculata (Wollaston, 1858)
- Blastobasis nivis
- Blastobasis normalis
- Blastobasis nothrotes
- Blastobasis ochreopalpella (Wollaston, 1858)
- Blastobasis ochrobathra
- Blastobasis ochromorpha
- Blastobasis orithyia
- Blastobasis orladelaneae
- Blastobasis pacalis Meyrick, 1922
- Blastobasis pallescens
- Blastobasis paludis
- Blastobasis pannonica Sumpich & Liska, 2011
- Blastobasis parki Sinev, 1986
- Blastobasis pentasticta
- Blastobasis phaedra
- Blastobasis phaeopasta
- Blastobasis phycidella (Zeller, 1839)
- Blastobasis pica (Walsingham, 1894)
- Blastobasis ponticella Sinev, 2007
- Blastobasis proagorella Zeller, 1877
- Blastobasis pulchella
- Blastobasis quaintancella
- Blastobasis rebeli Sinev & Karsholt, 2004
- Blastobasis repartella
- Blastobasis retectella
- Blastobasis rosmarinella Walsingham, 1901
- Blastobasis rotae
- Blastobasis rotullae
- Blastobasis rubiginosella Rebel, 1896
- Blastobasis salebrosella Rebel, 1940
- Blastobasis sardinica Sumpich, 2012
- Blastobasis sciota Bradley, 1961
- Blastobasis scotia
- Blastobasis semilutea Meyrick, 1916
- Blastobasis serradaguae Sinev & Karsholt, 2004
- Blastobasis sinica Adamski & Li, 2010
- Blastobasis spectabilella Rebel, 1940
- Blastobasis spermologa
- Blastobasis spiniella Park, 2000
- Blastobasis splendens Sinev & Karsholt, 2004
- Blastobasis sprotundalis Park, 1984
- Blastobasis subdivisus Sinev & Karsholt, 2004
- Blastobasis subolivacea Walsingham, 1897
- Blastobasis suppletella Zeller, 1877
- Blastobasis syrmatodes Meyrick, 1922
- Blastobasis tabernatella (Legrand, 1966)
- Blastobasis tanyptera
- Blastobasis tapetae
- Blastobasis tarachodes (Walsingham, 1912)
- Blastobasis tarda
- Blastobasis taricheuta Meyrick, 1909
- Blastobasis taurusella Adamski, 2004
- Blastobasis thyone
- Blastobasis trachelista Meyrick, 1921
- Blastobasis transcripta
- Blastobasis triangularis Walsingham, 1897
- Blastobasis tridigitella
- Blastobasis usurae
- Blastobasis velutina Walsingham, 1908
- Blastobasis vesta
- Blastobasis virgatella Sinev & Karsholt, 2004
- Blastobasis vittata
- Blastobasis walsinghami Sinev & Karsholt, 2004
- Blastobasis wolffi Sinev & Karsholt, 2004
- Blastobasis wollastoni Sinev & Karsholt, 2004
- Blastobasis xiphiae
- Blastobasis yuccaecolella
