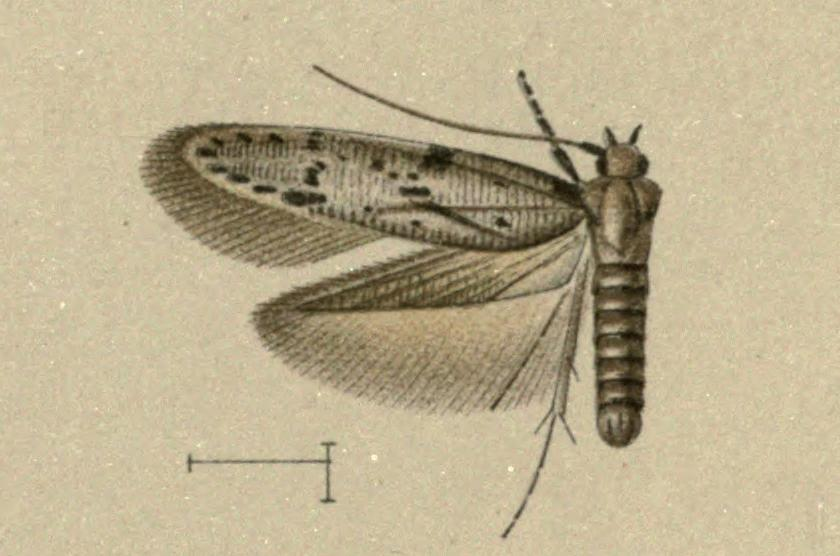

Scientific classification
- Kingdom: Animalia
- Phylum: Arthropoda
- Clade: Pancrustacea
- Class: Insecta
- Order: Lepidoptera
- Family: Blastobasidae
- Genus: Blastobasis
- Species: B. exclusa

Binomial name
- Blastobasis exclusa (Walsingham, 1908)

Synonyms
- Prosthesis exclusa Walsingham, 1908

= Blastobasis exclusa =

Species of moth in genus Blastobasis

Blastobasis exclusa is a moth in the family Blastobasidae. It is found on the Canary Islands.

The wingspan is 12–14 mm. The forewings are pale stony grey, sparsely sprinkled with fuscous and rust-brown scales. The hindwings are grey.
