= Blastobasis laurisilvae =

Scientific classification
- Kingdom: Animalia
- Phylum: Arthropoda
- Clade: Pancrustacea
- Class: Insecta
- Order: Lepidoptera
- Family: Blastobasidae
- Genus: Blastobasis
- Species: B. laurisilvae

Binomial name
- Blastobasis laurisilvae Sinev & Karsholt, 2004

Species of moth in genus Blastobasis

Blastobasis laurisilvae is a moth in the family Blastobasidae. It is found on Madeira.
