= Blastobasis yuccaecolella =

Scientific classification
- Kingdom: Animalia
- Phylum: Arthropoda
- Clade: Pancrustacea
- Class: Insecta
- Order: Lepidoptera
- Family: Blastobasidae
- Genus: Blastobasis
- Species: B. yuccaecolella

Binomial name
- Blastobasis yuccaecolella Dietz, 1910

Species of moth in genus Blastobasis

Blastobasis yuccaecolella is a moth in the family Blastobasidae. It is found in the United States, including Pennsylvania.

The larvae feed within decaying seed pods of Yucca baccata.
