= Blastobasis luteella =

Scientific classification
- Kingdom: Animalia
- Phylum: Arthropoda
- Clade: Pancrustacea
- Class: Insecta
- Order: Lepidoptera
- Family: Blastobasidae
- Genus: Blastobasis
- Species: B. luteella

Binomial name
- Blastobasis luteella Karsholt & Sinev, 2004

Species of moth in genus Blastobasis

Blastobasis luteella is a moth in the family Blastobasidae. It is endemic to Madeira (including Porto Santo).

The wingspan is 13–22 mm (0.51–0.87 in). It is most commonly found at low altitudes but has been found up to 1,000 m (3,300 ft) above sea level. It has been reared from Carpobrotus edulis, Pelargonium zonale, and Dianthus caryophyllus.
