= Blastobasis nephelophaea =

Scientific classification
- Kingdom: Animalia
- Phylum: Arthropoda
- Clade: Pancrustacea
- Class: Insecta
- Order: Lepidoptera
- Family: Blastobasidae
- Genus: Blastobasis
- Species: B. nephelophaea

Binomial name
- Blastobasis nephelophaea Meyrick, 1931

Species of moth in genus Blastobasis

Blastobasis nephelophaea is a moth in the family Blastobasidae. It was described by Edward Meyrick in 1931. It is endemic to Taiwan.
