= Blastobasis albidella =

Scientific classification
- Kingdom: Animalia
- Phylum: Arthropoda
- Clade: Pancrustacea
- Class: Insecta
- Order: Lepidoptera
- Family: Blastobasidae
- Genus: Blastobasis
- Species: B. albidella

Binomial name
- Blastobasis albidella Rebel, 1928

Species of moth in genus Blastobasis

Blastobasis albidella is a moth in the family Blastobasidae. It was described by Hans Rebel in 1928. It is found in Morocco.
