= Blastobasis atlantella =

Scientific classification
- Kingdom: Animalia
- Phylum: Arthropoda
- Clade: Pancrustacea
- Class: Insecta
- Order: Lepidoptera
- Family: Blastobasidae
- Genus: Blastobasis
- Species: B. atlantella

Binomial name
- Blastobasis atlantella Zerny, 1935

Species of moth in genus Blastobasis

Blastobasis atlantella is a moth in the family Blastobasidae. It was described by Hans Zerny in 1935. It is found in Morocco.
