= Blastobasis ochromorpha =

Scientific classification
- Kingdom: Animalia
- Phylum: Arthropoda
- Clade: Pancrustacea
- Class: Insecta
- Order: Lepidoptera
- Family: Blastobasidae
- Genus: Blastobasis
- Species: B. ochromorpha

Binomial name
- Blastobasis ochromorpha Meyrick, 1925

Species of moth in genus Blastobasis

Blastobasis ochromorpha is a moth in the family Blastobasidae. It is found in India and Singapore.

The wingspan is about 13 mm. Adults are pale coloured.

The larvae feed on a wide range of plants, including onion and stored rice. They have also been recorded feeding within the seeds of Shorea robusta.
