= Blastobasis spectabilella =

Scientific classification
- Kingdom: Animalia
- Phylum: Arthropoda
- Clade: Pancrustacea
- Class: Insecta
- Order: Lepidoptera
- Family: Blastobasidae
- Genus: Blastobasis
- Species: B. spectabilella

Binomial name
- Blastobasis spectabilella Rebel, 1940

Species of moth in genus Blastobasis

Blastobasis spectabilella is a moth in the family Blastobasidae. It is found on Madeira.
