= Blastobasis acarta =

Scientific classification
- Kingdom: Animalia
- Phylum: Arthropoda
- Clade: Pancrustacea
- Class: Insecta
- Order: Lepidoptera
- Family: Blastobasidae
- Genus: Blastobasis
- Species: B. acarta

Binomial name
- Blastobasis acarta Meyrick, 1911

Species of moth in genus Blastobasis

Blastobasis acarta is a moth in the family Blastobasidae. It was described by Edward Meyrick in 1911. It is found on the Seychelles, where it is known from the islands of Aldabra, Aride, Mahé and Silhouette.

This species has a wingspan of 15–16 mm, the head is whitish ochreous mixed with pale fuscous. The forewings are greyish ochreous irregularly tinged with purple brownish and speckled with dark fuscous. A spot towards base of costa and an angulated transverse line of dark fuscous before the middle.
