= Blastobasis inana =

Scientific classification
- Kingdom: Animalia
- Phylum: Arthropoda
- Clade: Pancrustacea
- Class: Insecta
- Order: Lepidoptera
- Family: Blastobasidae
- Genus: Blastobasis
- Species: B. inana

Binomial name
- Blastobasis inana (Butler, 1881)

Synonyms
- Gracilaria inana Butler, 1881; Lateantenna inana (Butler, 1881); Blastobasis explorata Meyrick, 1918

Species of moth in genus Blastobasis

Blastobasis inana is a moth of the family Blastobasidae. It was first described by Arthur Gardiner Butler in 1881 from Hawaii, but it is a widely dispersed species whose distribution includes India, New Britain and French Polynesia.

Larvae have been recorded feeding on garden beans, coffee berries, dead sugarcane Citrus species and Dioscorea species.

== Distribution ==
It is known to occur in Hawaii, New Britain, French Polynesia, India, Japan, Réunion, Thailand, China and Papua New Guinea.
