= Blastobasis manto =

Scientific classification
- Kingdom: Animalia
- Phylum: Arthropoda
- Clade: Pancrustacea
- Class: Insecta
- Order: Lepidoptera
- Family: Blastobasidae
- Genus: Blastobasis
- Species: B. manto

Binomial name
- Blastobasis manto Adamski, 2013

Species of moth in genus Blastobasis

Blastobasis manto is a moth in the family Blastobasidae. It is found in Costa Rica.

The length of the forewings is about 5.9 mm.
