= Blastobasis mpala =

Scientific classification
- Kingdom: Animalia
- Phylum: Arthropoda
- Clade: Pancrustacea
- Class: Insecta
- Order: Lepidoptera
- Family: Blastobasidae
- Genus: Blastobasis
- Species: B. mpala

Binomial name
- Blastobasis mpala Adamski, 2010

Species of moth in genus Blastobasis

Blastobasis mpala is a moth in the family Blastobasidae. It is found in Kenya, where it is known from savanna habitat in the central highlands.

The length of the forewings is 7.1–8.2 mm.
