= Blastobasis parki =

Scientific classification
- Kingdom: Animalia
- Phylum: Arthropoda
- Clade: Pancrustacea
- Class: Insecta
- Order: Lepidoptera
- Family: Blastobasidae
- Genus: Blastobasis
- Species: B. parki

Binomial name
- Blastobasis parki Sinev, 1986

Species of moth in genus Blastobasis

Blastobasis parki is a moth in the family Blastobasidae. It was described by Sergej Sinev in 1986 from Primorye in the Russian Far East. It is known from Russia, Korea and mainland China.
