= Blastobasis determinata =

Scientific classification
- Kingdom: Animalia
- Phylum: Arthropoda
- Clade: Pancrustacea
- Class: Insecta
- Order: Lepidoptera
- Family: Blastobasidae
- Genus: Blastobasis
- Species: B. determinata

Binomial name
- Blastobasis determinata Meyrick, 1921

Species of moth in genus Blastobasis

Blastobasis determinata is a moth in the family Blastobasidae. It is found in South Africa.

The length of the forewings is 5.9 mm.
