= Blastobasis normalis =

Scientific classification
- Kingdom: Animalia
- Phylum: Arthropoda
- Clade: Pancrustacea
- Class: Insecta
- Order: Lepidoptera
- Family: Blastobasidae
- Genus: Blastobasis
- Species: B. normalis

Binomial name
- Blastobasis normalis (Meyrick, 1918)

Synonyms
- Auximobasis normalis Meyrick, 1918; Blastobasis crotospila Meyrick, 1926

Species of moth in genus Blastobasis

Blastobasis normalis is a moth in the family Blastobasidae. It is found in mainland Ecuador and on the Galapagos Islands. A single specimen was recorded in Liverpool in September 1921, but this might be based on a misidentification.

The length of the forewings is 4.2-6.4 mm.
