= Blastobasis molinda =

Scientific classification
- Kingdom: Animalia
- Phylum: Arthropoda
- Clade: Pancrustacea
- Class: Insecta
- Order: Lepidoptera
- Family: Blastobasidae
- Genus: Blastobasis
- Species: B. molinda

Binomial name
- Blastobasis molinda Meyrick, 1925

Species of moth in genus Blastobasis

Blastobasis molinda is a moth in the family Blastobasidae. It is found in India.

The larvae have been recorded feeding within the seeds of Shorea robusta.
