= Blastobasis centralasiae =

Scientific classification
- Kingdom: Animalia
- Phylum: Arthropoda
- Clade: Pancrustacea
- Class: Insecta
- Order: Lepidoptera
- Family: Blastobasidae
- Genus: Blastobasis
- Species: B. centralasiae

Binomial name
- Blastobasis centralasiae Sinev, 2007

Species of moth in genus Blastobasis

Blastobasis centralasiae is a moth in the family Blastobasidae. It is found in Central Asia and the southern part of European Russia.
