= Blastobasis confectella =

Scientific classification
- Kingdom: Animalia
- Phylum: Arthropoda
- Clade: Pancrustacea
- Class: Insecta
- Order: Lepidoptera
- Family: Blastobasidae
- Genus: Blastobasis
- Species: B. confectella

Binomial name
- Blastobasis confectella (Zeller, 1873)

Synonyms
- Hypatima confectella Zeller, 1873

Species of moth in genus Blastobasis

Blastobasis confectella is a moth in the family Blastobasidae. It is found in the United States, including Texas.
