= Blastobasis ianella =

Scientific classification
- Kingdom: Animalia
- Phylum: Arthropoda
- Clade: Pancrustacea
- Class: Insecta
- Order: Lepidoptera
- Family: Blastobasidae
- Genus: Blastobasis
- Species: B. ianella

Binomial name
- Blastobasis ianella Adamski, 2003

Species of moth in genus Blastobasis

Blastobasis ianella is a moth in the family Blastobasidae. It is found in Thailand.

The length of the forewings is 6.3–7 mm.

== Etymology ==
The species is named in honour of the then newly born Ian Edward Emanuel.
