= Blastobasis repartella =

Scientific classification
- Kingdom: Animalia
- Phylum: Arthropoda
- Clade: Pancrustacea
- Class: Insecta
- Order: Lepidoptera
- Family: Blastobasidae
- Genus: Blastobasis
- Species: B. repartella

Binomial name
- Blastobasis repartella (Dietz, 1910)

Synonyms
- Valentinia repartella Dietz, 1910

Species of moth in genus Blastobasis

Blastobasis repartella is a moth in the family Blastobasidae. It is found in the United States, including Colorado, Maine, South Dakota and Illinois.

Adults from mid-July to mid-August in eastern South Dakota. Mature larvae are commonly found in late May. Pupae are mostly found during mid to late June within the plant stem.
