= Blastobasis atmosema =

Scientific classification
- Kingdom: Animalia
- Phylum: Arthropoda
- Clade: Pancrustacea
- Class: Insecta
- Order: Lepidoptera
- Family: Blastobasidae
- Genus: Blastobasis
- Species: B. atmosema

Binomial name
- Blastobasis atmosema Meyrick, 1930

Species of moth in genus Blastobasis

Blastobasis atmosema is a moth in the family Blastobasidae. It was described by Edward Meyrick in 1930. It is found in Brazil (Para).
