= Blastobasis bispinaella =

Scientific classification
- Kingdom: Animalia
- Phylum: Arthropoda
- Clade: Pancrustacea
- Class: Insecta
- Order: Lepidoptera
- Family: Blastobasidae
- Genus: Blastobasis
- Species: B. bispinaella

Binomial name
- Blastobasis bispinaella Adamski, 2003

Species of moth in genus Blastobasis

Blastobasis bispinaella is a moth in the family Blastobasidae. It is found in Thailand.

The length of the forewings is 5.5 mm.
