= Blastobasis intrepida =

Scientific classification
- Kingdom: Animalia
- Phylum: Arthropoda
- Clade: Pancrustacea
- Class: Insecta
- Order: Lepidoptera
- Family: Blastobasidae
- Genus: Blastobasis
- Species: B. intrepida

Binomial name
- Blastobasis intrepida Meyrick, 1911

Species of moth in genus Blastobasis

Blastobasis intrepida is a moth in the family Blastobasidae. It was described by Edward Meyrick in 1911. It is found on the Seychelles.
