= Blastobasis tabernatella =

Scientific classification
- Kingdom: Animalia
- Phylum: Arthropoda
- Clade: Pancrustacea
- Class: Insecta
- Order: Lepidoptera
- Family: Blastobasidae
- Genus: Blastobasis
- Species: B. tabernatella

Binomial name
- Blastobasis tabernatella (Legrand, 1966)

Synonyms
- Opogona tabernatella Legrand, 1966

Species of moth in genus Blastobasis

Blastobasis tabernatella is a moth in the family Blastobasidae. It was described by Henry Legrand in 1966. It is found on the Seychelles.
