= Blastobasis taricheuta =

Scientific classification
- Kingdom: Animalia
- Phylum: Arthropoda
- Clade: Pancrustacea
- Class: Insecta
- Order: Lepidoptera
- Family: Blastobasidae
- Genus: Blastobasis
- Species: B. taricheuta

Binomial name
- Blastobasis taricheuta Meyrick, 1909

Species of moth in genus Blastobasis

Blastobasis taricheuta is a moth in the family Blastobasidae. It is found in South Africa.

The length of the forewings is 9.6 mm.
