= Blastobasis magna =

Scientific classification
- Kingdom: Animalia
- Phylum: Arthropoda
- Clade: Pancrustacea
- Class: Insecta
- Order: Lepidoptera
- Family: Blastobasidae
- Genus: Blastobasis
- Species: B. magna

Binomial name
- Blastobasis magna Amsel, 1952

Species of moth in genus Blastobasis

Blastobasis magna is a moth in the family Blastobasidae. It is found on the Channel Islands, in Italy, Portugal, Spain and on Sardinia and Sicily.

== Taxonomy ==
The species was previously treated as a subspecies of Blastobasis roscidella.
