= Blastobasis sprotundalis =

Scientific classification
- Kingdom: Animalia
- Phylum: Arthropoda
- Clade: Pancrustacea
- Class: Insecta
- Order: Lepidoptera
- Family: Blastobasidae
- Genus: Blastobasis
- Species: B. sprotundalis

Binomial name
- Blastobasis sprotundalis Park, 1984

Species of moth in genus Blastobasis

Blastobasis sprotundalis is a moth in the family Blastobasidae. It was described by Kyu-Tek Park in 1984. It is found in Russia and Japan.
