= Blastobasis ochreopalpella =

Scientific classification
- Kingdom: Animalia
- Phylum: Arthropoda
- Clade: Pancrustacea
- Class: Insecta
- Order: Lepidoptera
- Family: Blastobasidae
- Genus: Blastobasis
- Species: B. ochreopalpella

Binomial name
- Blastobasis ochreopalpella (Wollaston, 1858)

Synonyms
- Oecophora ochreopalpella Wollaston, 1858

Species of moth in genus Blastobasis

Blastobasis ochreopalpella is a moth in the family Blastobasidae. It is found on Madeira.
