= Blastobasis vesta =

Scientific classification
- Kingdom: Animalia
- Phylum: Arthropoda
- Clade: Pancrustacea
- Class: Insecta
- Order: Lepidoptera
- Family: Blastobasidae
- Genus: Blastobasis
- Species: B. vesta

Binomial name
- Blastobasis vesta Adamski, 2013

Species of moth in genus Blastobasis

Blastobasis vesta is a moth in the family Blastobasidae. It is found in Costa Rica.

The length of the forewings is 5.1–7.4 mm.

== Etymology ==
The specific name refers to Vesta, daughter of Saturn and Ops.
