= Blastobasis nivis =

Scientific classification
- Kingdom: Animalia
- Phylum: Arthropoda
- Clade: Pancrustacea
- Class: Insecta
- Order: Lepidoptera
- Family: Blastobasidae
- Genus: Blastobasis
- Species: B. nivis

Binomial name
- Blastobasis nivis Adamski, 2013

Species of moth in genus Blastobasis

Blastobasis nivis is a moth in the family Blastobasidae. It is found in Costa Rica.

The length of the forewings is 3.7–4.3 mm.
