= Blastobasis egens =

Scientific classification
- Kingdom: Animalia
- Phylum: Arthropoda
- Clade: Pancrustacea
- Class: Insecta
- Order: Lepidoptera
- Family: Blastobasidae
- Genus: Blastobasis
- Species: B. egens

Binomial name
- Blastobasis egens Meyrick, 1918

Species of moth in genus Blastobasis

Blastobasis egens is a moth in the family Blastobasidae. It is found in South Africa and the Democratic Republic of the Congo.

The length of the forewings is 4.5–4.9 mm.
