= Blastobasis episema =

Scientific classification
- Kingdom: Animalia
- Phylum: Arthropoda
- Clade: Pancrustacea
- Class: Insecta
- Order: Lepidoptera
- Family: Blastobasidae
- Genus: Blastobasis
- Species: B. episema

Binomial name
- Blastobasis episema Turner, 1918

Species of moth in genus Blastobasis

Blastobasis episema is a moth in the family Blastobasidae. It was described by Turner in 1918. It is found on Lord Howe Island.
