= Blastobasis indigesta =

Scientific classification
- Kingdom: Animalia
- Phylum: Arthropoda
- Clade: Pancrustacea
- Class: Insecta
- Order: Lepidoptera
- Family: Blastobasidae
- Genus: Blastobasis
- Species: B. indigesta

Binomial name
- Blastobasis indigesta Meyrick, 1931

Synonyms
- Neoblastobasis indigesta

Species of moth in genus Blastobasis

Blastobasis indigesta is a moth in the family Blastobasidae. It is found in Zimbabwe.

The length of the forewings is 7–7.9 mm.
