= Blastobasis athymopa =

Scientific classification
- Kingdom: Animalia
- Phylum: Arthropoda
- Clade: Pancrustacea
- Class: Insecta
- Order: Lepidoptera
- Family: Blastobasidae
- Genus: Blastobasis
- Species: B. athymopa

Binomial name
- Blastobasis athymopa Meyrick, 1932

Species of moth in genus Blastobasis

Blastobasis athymopa is a moth in the family Blastobasidae. It was described by Edward Meyrick in 1932. It is found in the West Indies.
