= Blastobasis ponticella =

Scientific classification
- Kingdom: Animalia
- Phylum: Arthropoda
- Clade: Pancrustacea
- Class: Insecta
- Order: Lepidoptera
- Family: Blastobasidae
- Genus: Blastobasis
- Species: B. ponticella

Binomial name
- Blastobasis ponticella Sinev, 2007

Species of moth in genus Blastobasis

Blastobasis ponticella is a moth in the family Blastobasidae. It is found in the north-western Caucasus, Transcaucasia, Crimea and the southern part of European Russia.
