= Blastobasis curta =

Scientific classification
- Kingdom: Animalia
- Phylum: Arthropoda
- Clade: Pancrustacea
- Class: Insecta
- Order: Lepidoptera
- Family: Blastobasidae
- Genus: Blastobasis
- Species: B. curta

Binomial name
- Blastobasis curta Meyrick, 1916

Synonyms
- Lateantenna curta (Meyrick, 1916)

Species of moth in genus Blastobasis

Blastobasis curta is a moth in the family Blastobasidae. It was described by Edward Meyrick in 1916. It is found in southern India.
