= Blastobasis floridella =

Scientific classification
- Kingdom: Animalia
- Phylum: Arthropoda
- Clade: Pancrustacea
- Class: Insecta
- Order: Lepidoptera
- Family: Blastobasidae
- Genus: Blastobasis
- Species: B. floridella

Binomial name
- Blastobasis floridella (Dietz, 1910)

Synonyms
- Valentinia floridella Dietz, 1910

Species of moth in genus Blastobasis

Blastobasis floridella is a moth in the family Blastobasidae. It is found in the United States, including Florida and Oklahoma.

The wingspan is 11–16 mm.

Larvae have been recorded feeding from the cones of Zamia pumila.
