= Blastobasis pica =

Scientific classification
- Kingdom: Animalia
- Phylum: Arthropoda
- Clade: Pancrustacea
- Class: Insecta
- Order: Lepidoptera
- Family: Blastobasidae
- Genus: Blastobasis
- Species: B. pica

Binomial name
- Blastobasis pica (Walsingham, 1894)

Synonyms
- Epistetus pica Walsingham, 1894

Species of moth in genus Blastobasis

Blastobasis pica is a moth in the family Blastobasidae. It is found on Madeira.
