= Blastobasis nigromaculata =

Scientific classification
- Kingdom: Animalia
- Phylum: Arthropoda
- Clade: Pancrustacea
- Class: Insecta
- Order: Lepidoptera
- Family: Blastobasidae
- Genus: Blastobasis
- Species: B. nigromaculata

Binomial name
- Blastobasis nigromaculata (Wollaston, 1858)

Synonyms
- Gelechia nigromaculata Wollaston, 1858

Species of moth in genus Blastobasis

Blastobasis nigromaculata is a moth in the family Blastobasidae. It is found on Madeira.
