= Blastobasis coffeaella =

Scientific classification
- Kingdom: Animalia
- Phylum: Arthropoda
- Clade: Pancrustacea
- Class: Insecta
- Order: Lepidoptera
- Family: Blastobasidae
- Genus: Blastobasis
- Species: B. coffeaella

Binomial name
- Blastobasis coffeaella (Busck, 1925)

Synonyms
- Auximobasis coffeaella Busck, 1925

Species of moth in genus Blastobasis

Blastobasis coffeaella is a moth in the family Blastobasidae. It is found in Costa Rica and São Paulo, Brazil.

The length of the forewings is 6.2–7.9 mm.

The larvae feed within beans of Coffea arabica.
