= Blastobasis legrandi =

Scientific classification
- Kingdom: Animalia
- Phylum: Arthropoda
- Clade: Pancrustacea
- Class: Insecta
- Order: Lepidoptera
- Family: Blastobasidae
- Genus: Blastobasis
- Species: B. legrandi

Binomial name
- Blastobasis legrandi Adamski, 1995

Species of moth in genus Blastobasis

Blastobasis legrandi is a moth in the family Blastobasidae. It was described by Adamski in 1995. It is found on the Seychelles.
