= Blastobasis basipectenella =

Scientific classification
- Kingdom: Animalia
- Phylum: Arthropoda
- Clade: Pancrustacea
- Class: Insecta
- Order: Lepidoptera
- Family: Blastobasidae
- Genus: Blastobasis
- Species: B. basipectenella

Binomial name
- Blastobasis basipectenella Adamski, 2003

Species of moth in genus Blastobasis

Blastobasis basipectenella is a moth in the family Blastobasidae. It is found in Thailand.

The length of the forewings is 6–6.1 mm.
