= Blastobasis maroccanella =

Scientific classification
- Kingdom: Animalia
- Phylum: Arthropoda
- Clade: Pancrustacea
- Class: Insecta
- Order: Lepidoptera
- Family: Blastobasidae
- Genus: Blastobasis
- Species: B. maroccanella

Binomial name
- Blastobasis maroccanella Amsel, 1952

Synonyms
- Blastobasis acuta Bradley, 1958

Species of moth in genus Blastobasis

Blastobasis maroccanella is a moth in the family Blastobasidae. It is found on the Azores, Madeira and in Portugal, Spain and Morocco. It was recently reported from California in the United States.
