= Blastobasis cineracella =

Scientific classification
- Kingdom: Animalia
- Phylum: Arthropoda
- Clade: Pancrustacea
- Class: Insecta
- Order: Lepidoptera
- Family: Blastobasidae
- Genus: Blastobasis
- Species: B. cineracella

Binomial name
- Blastobasis cineracella Amsel, 1953

Species of moth in genus Blastobasis

Blastobasis cineracella is a moth in the family Blastobasidae. It was described by Hans Georg Amsel in 1953. It is found in Morocco.
