= Blastobasis phaedra =

Scientific classification
- Kingdom: Animalia
- Phylum: Arthropoda
- Clade: Pancrustacea
- Class: Insecta
- Order: Lepidoptera
- Family: Blastobasidae
- Genus: Blastobasis
- Species: B. phaedra

Binomial name
- Blastobasis phaedra Adamski, 2013

Species of moth in genus Blastobasis

Blastobasis phaedra is a moth in the family Blastobasidae. It is found in Costa Rica.

The length of the forewings is 6–7 mm.

== Etymology ==
The specific name is derived from Phaedra, daughter of Minos.
