= Blastobasis iuanae =

Scientific classification
- Kingdom: Animalia
- Phylum: Arthropoda
- Clade: Pancrustacea
- Class: Insecta
- Order: Lepidoptera
- Family: Blastobasidae
- Genus: Blastobasis
- Species: B. iuanae

Binomial name
- Blastobasis iuanae Adamski, 2013

Species of moth in genus Blastobasis

Blastobasis iuanae is a moth in the family Blastobasidae. It is found in Costa Rica.

The length of the forewings is 5.2–7.2 mm.

== Etymology ==
The specific epithet is derived from Latin iuana (meaning door).
