= Blastobasis usurae =

Scientific classification
- Kingdom: Animalia
- Phylum: Arthropoda
- Clade: Pancrustacea
- Class: Insecta
- Order: Lepidoptera
- Family: Blastobasidae
- Genus: Blastobasis
- Species: B. usurae

Binomial name
- Blastobasis usurae Adamski, 2013

Species of moth in genus Blastobasis

Blastobasis usurae is a moth in the family Blastobasidae. It is found in Costa Rica.

The length of the forewings is about 4.9 mm.
