= Blastobasis orladelaneae =

Scientific classification
- Kingdom: Animalia
- Phylum: Arthropoda
- Clade: Pancrustacea
- Class: Insecta
- Order: Lepidoptera
- Family: Blastobasidae
- Genus: Blastobasis
- Species: B. orladelaneae

Binomial name
- Blastobasis orladelaneae Adamski & R.L. Brown, 2002

Species of moth in genus Blastobasis

Blastobasis orladelaneae is a moth in the family Blastobasidae that is endemic to New Caledonia.

The length of the forewings is 6 millimetres (0.24 in).
