= Blastobasis sciota =

Scientific classification
- Kingdom: Animalia
- Phylum: Arthropoda
- Clade: Pancrustacea
- Class: Insecta
- Order: Lepidoptera
- Family: Blastobasidae
- Genus: Blastobasis
- Species: B. sciota

Binomial name
- Blastobasis sciota Bradley, 1961

Species of moth in genus Blastobasis

Blastobasis sciota is a moth in the family Blastobasidae. It was described by John David Bradley in 1961 and is found on Guadalcanal.
