= Blastobasis insularis =

Scientific classification
- Kingdom: Animalia
- Phylum: Arthropoda
- Clade: Pancrustacea
- Class: Insecta
- Order: Lepidoptera
- Family: Blastobasidae
- Genus: Blastobasis
- Species: B. insularis

Binomial name
- Blastobasis insularis (Wollaston, 1858)

Synonyms
- Asychna insularis Wollaston, 1858; Metriotes insularis Wollaston, 1858

Species of moth in genus Blastobasis

Blastobasis insularis is a moth in the family Blastobasidae. It is found on the Canary Islands and Madeira.
