= Blastobasis murcyae =

Scientific classification
- Kingdom: Animalia
- Phylum: Arthropoda
- Clade: Pancrustacea
- Class: Insecta
- Order: Lepidoptera
- Family: Blastobasidae
- Genus: Blastobasis
- Species: B. murcyae

Binomial name
- Blastobasis murcyae Adamski & R.L. Brown, 2002

Species of moth in genus Blastobasis

Blastobasis murcyae is a moth in the family Blastobasidae that is endemic to New Caledonia.

The length of the forewings is 4.5–5.1 millimetres (0.18–0.20 in).
