= Blastobasis kenya =

Scientific classification
- Kingdom: Animalia
- Phylum: Arthropoda
- Clade: Pancrustacea
- Class: Insecta
- Order: Lepidoptera
- Family: Blastobasidae
- Genus: Blastobasis
- Species: B. kenya

Binomial name
- Blastobasis kenya Adamski, 2010

Species of moth in genus Blastobasis

Blastobasis kenya is a moth in the family Blastobasidae. It is found in Kenya. The habitat consists of coastal lowlands, eastern middle elevations, and the western highlands.

The length of the forewings is 6–9.2 mm.

== Food ==
The larvae feed on a wide range of plants, including:

- Adenia
- Calophyllum inophyllum
- Cola minor
- Deinbollia borbonica
- Diospyros kabuyeana
- Diphasia
- Donella viridifolia
- Dovyalis macrocalyx
- Dracaena mannii
- Flacourtia indica
- Hirtella zanzibarica zanzibarica
- Inhambanella henriquesii
- Landolphia
- Lecaniodiscus fraxinifolius scassellatii
- Lepisanthes senegalensis
- Ludia mauritiana
- Manilkara sansibarensis
- Mimusops aedificatoria
- Olea woodiana disjuncta
- Oxyanthus goetzei keniensis
- Rourea minor
- Saba comorensis
- Salacia elegans
- Strychnos madagascariensis
- Terminalia catappa
- Toddalia asiatica
- Trichilia emetica
- Trilepisium madagascariense
- Vepris nobilis
- Ximenia afra
- Xylopia

== Etymology ==
The species epithet, kenya, refers to the country of Kenya.
