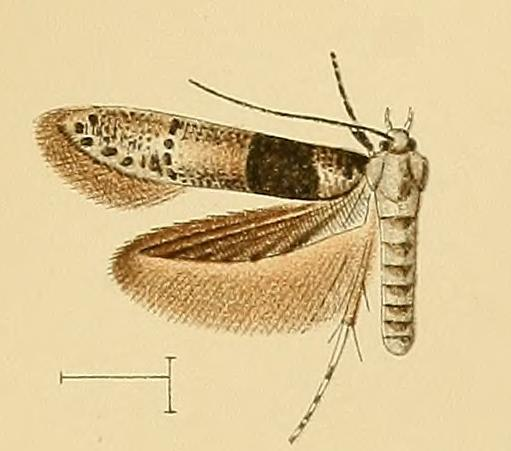

Scientific classification
- Kingdom: Animalia
- Phylum: Arthropoda
- Clade: Pancrustacea
- Class: Insecta
- Order: Lepidoptera
- Family: Blastobasidae
- Genus: Blastobasis
- Species: B. velutina

Binomial name
- Blastobasis velutina Walsingham, 1908

= Blastobasis velutina =

Species of moth in genus Blastobasis

Blastobasis velutina is a moth in the family Blastobasidae. It is found on the Canary Islands.

The wingspan is 11–14 mm. The forewings are ash-grey with markings consisting of black scales. The hindwings are ash-grey, shaded with black at the sides and posterior.
