= Blastobasis nothrotes =

Scientific classification
- Kingdom: Animalia
- Phylum: Arthropoda
- Clade: Pancrustacea
- Class: Insecta
- Order: Lepidoptera
- Family: Blastobasidae
- Genus: Blastobasis
- Species: B. nothrotes

Binomial name
- Blastobasis nothrotes (Walsingham, 1907)

Synonyms
- Valentinia nothrotes Walsingham, 1907

Species of moth in genus Blastobasis

Blastobasis nothrotes is a moth in the family Blastobasidae. It is found in the United States, including Arizona and California.

The wingspan is about 12 mm. The forewings are dirty white, sprinkled with grayish fuscous. The hindwings are brownish gray.
