= Blastobasis atmozona =

Scientific classification
- Kingdom: Animalia
- Phylum: Arthropoda
- Clade: Pancrustacea
- Class: Insecta
- Order: Lepidoptera
- Family: Blastobasidae
- Genus: Blastobasis
- Species: B. atmozona

Binomial name
- Blastobasis atmozona Meyrick, 1939

Species of moth in genus Blastobasis

Blastobasis atmozona is a moth in the family Blastobasidae. It was described by Edward Meyrick in 1939. It is found in Argentina.
