= Blastobasis bassii =

Scientific classification
- Kingdom: Animalia
- Phylum: Arthropoda
- Clade: Pancrustacea
- Class: Insecta
- Order: Lepidoptera
- Family: Blastobasidae
- Genus: Blastobasis
- Species: B. bassii

Binomial name
- Blastobasis bassii Karsholt & Sinev, 2004

Species of moth in genus Blastobasis

Blastobasis bassii is a moth in the family Blastobasidae. It is endemic to Madeira (including Porto Santo).

The wingspan is 12–15 mm (0.47–0.59 in). It has been found at 600–1,800 m (2,000–5,900 ft) above sea level, but mostly between 800–1,000 m (2,600–3,300 ft).
