= Blastobasis anachasta =

Scientific classification
- Kingdom: Animalia
- Phylum: Arthropoda
- Clade: Pancrustacea
- Class: Insecta
- Order: Lepidoptera
- Family: Blastobasidae
- Genus: Blastobasis
- Species: B. anachasta

Binomial name
- Blastobasis anachasta Meyrick, 1931

Synonyms
- Triclonella anachasta

Species of moth in genus Blastobasis

Blastobasis anachasta is a moth in the family Blastobasidae. It was described by Edward Meyrick in 1931. It is found in Brazil.
