= Blastobasis candidata =

Scientific classification
- Kingdom: Animalia
- Phylum: Arthropoda
- Clade: Pancrustacea
- Class: Insecta
- Order: Lepidoptera
- Family: Blastobasidae
- Genus: Blastobasis
- Species: B. candidata

Binomial name
- Blastobasis candidata Meyrick, 1922

Species of moth in genus Blastobasis

Blastobasis candidata is a moth in the family Blastobasidae. It was described by Edward Meyrick in 1922. It is found in Peru.
