= Blastobasis inouei =

Scientific classification
- Kingdom: Animalia
- Phylum: Arthropoda
- Clade: Pancrustacea
- Class: Insecta
- Order: Lepidoptera
- Family: Blastobasidae
- Genus: Blastobasis
- Species: B. inouei

Binomial name
- Blastobasis inouei Moriuti, 1987

Species of moth

Blastobasis inouei is a species of moth in the family Blastobasidae. It was described by Sigeru Moriuti in 1987. It can be found in Russia and Japan.
