= Blastobasis bilineatella =

Scientific classification
- Kingdom: Animalia
- Phylum: Arthropoda
- Clade: Pancrustacea
- Class: Insecta
- Order: Lepidoptera
- Family: Blastobasidae
- Genus: Blastobasis
- Species: B. bilineatella

Binomial name
- Blastobasis bilineatella D. Lucas, 1956

Species of moth in genus Blastobasis

Blastobasis bilineatella is a moth in the family Blastobasidae. It was described by Daniel Lucas in 1956. It is found in Morocco.
