= Blastobasis rubiginosella =

Scientific classification
- Kingdom: Animalia
- Phylum: Arthropoda
- Clade: Pancrustacea
- Class: Insecta
- Order: Lepidoptera
- Family: Blastobasidae
- Genus: Blastobasis
- Species: B. rubiginosella

Binomial name
- Blastobasis rubiginosella Rebel, 1896

Species of moth in genus Blastobasis

Blastobasis rubiginosella is a moth in the family Blastobasidae. It is found on the Canary Islands.

The wingspan is about 16 mm. The forewings have an ash-grey ground colour with reddish-brown markings. The hindwings are dark brown-grey.
