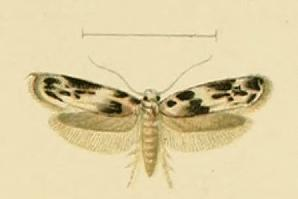

Scientific classification
- Kingdom: Animalia
- Phylum: Arthropoda
- Clade: Pancrustacea
- Class: Insecta
- Order: Lepidoptera
- Family: Blastobasidae
- Genus: Blastobasis
- Species: B. helleri

Binomial name
- Blastobasis helleri Rebel, 1910

= Blastobasis helleri =

Species of moth in genus Blastobasis

Blastobasis helleri is a moth in the family Blastobasidae. It is found on the Canary Islands.

The length of the forewings is about 6 mm. The forewings are white, with blackish-brown markings. The hindwings are shining grey.
