= Blastobasis erae =

Scientific classification
- Kingdom: Animalia
- Phylum: Arthropoda
- Clade: Pancrustacea
- Class: Insecta
- Order: Lepidoptera
- Family: Blastobasidae
- Genus: Blastobasis
- Species: B. erae

Binomial name
- Blastobasis erae Adamski, 2013

Species of moth in genus Blastobasis

Blastobasis erae is a moth in the family Blastobasidae. It is found in Costa Rica.

The length of the forewings is 5.4–6.5 mm.
