= Blastobasis quaintancella =

Scientific classification
- Kingdom: Animalia
- Phylum: Arthropoda
- Clade: Pancrustacea
- Class: Insecta
- Order: Lepidoptera
- Family: Blastobasidae
- Genus: Blastobasis
- Species: B. quaintancella

Binomial name
- Blastobasis quaintancella (Dietz, 1910)

Synonyms
- Valentinia quaintancella Dietz, 1910

Species of moth in genus Blastobasis

Blastobasis quaintancella is a moth in the family Blastobasidae. It is found in the eastern United States, including Maine and Florida.

The larvae feed on the fruits of Malus species.
