= Blastobasis ochrobathra =

Scientific classification
- Kingdom: Animalia
- Phylum: Arthropoda
- Clade: Pancrustacea
- Class: Insecta
- Order: Lepidoptera
- Family: Blastobasidae
- Genus: Blastobasis
- Species: B. ochrobathra

Binomial name
- Blastobasis ochrobathra Meyrick, 1921

Synonyms
- Holcocera ochrobathra

Species of moth in genus Blastobasis

Blastobasis ochrobathra is a moth in the family Blastobasidae. It is found in Guyana and Florida, United States.

The larvae feed on detritus of Cocos nucifera.
