= Blastobasis argillacea =

Scientific classification
- Kingdom: Animalia
- Phylum: Arthropoda
- Clade: Pancrustacea
- Class: Insecta
- Order: Lepidoptera
- Family: Blastobasidae
- Genus: Blastobasis
- Species: B. argillacea

Binomial name
- Blastobasis argillacea Walsingham, 1897

Species of moth in genus Blastobasis

Blastobasis argillacea is a moth in the family Blastobasidae. It was described by Thomas de Grey, 6th Baron Walsingham in 1897. It is found in the West Indies.
