= Blastobasis industria =

Scientific classification
- Kingdom: Animalia
- Phylum: Arthropoda
- Clade: Pancrustacea
- Class: Insecta
- Order: Lepidoptera
- Family: Blastobasidae
- Genus: Blastobasis
- Species: B. industria

Binomial name
- Blastobasis industria Meyrick, 1913

Species of moth in genus Blastobasis

Blastobasis industria is a moth in the family Blastobasidae. It is found in Ethiopia and South Africa.

The length of the forewings is 7.9–9.9 mm.
