= Blastobasis graminea =

Scientific classification
- Kingdom: Animalia
- Phylum: Arthropoda
- Clade: Pancrustacea
- Class: Insecta
- Order: Lepidoptera
- Family: Blastobasidae
- Genus: Blastobasis
- Species: B. graminea

Binomial name
- Blastobasis graminea Adamski, 1999

Species of moth in genus Blastobasis

Blastobasis graminea is a moth in the family Blastobasidae. It is found in Colombia, Venezuela, Costa Rica, Mexico (Autlan and Veracruz) and the south-eastern United States (southern Louisiana).

The length of the forewings is 8.9–9 mm.

The larvae bore the stem of Saccharum officinarum, Sorghum aethiopicum, Zea mays, Coix lacryma-jobi, Setaria paniculifera and Spartina alterniflora.
