= Blastobasis dyssema =

Scientific classification
- Kingdom: Animalia
- Phylum: Arthropoda
- Clade: Pancrustacea
- Class: Insecta
- Order: Lepidoptera
- Family: Blastobasidae
- Genus: Blastobasis
- Species: B. dyssema

Binomial name
- Blastobasis dyssema Turner, 1918

Species of moth in genus Blastobasis

Blastobasis dyssema is a moth in the family Blastobasidae. It was described by Turner in 1918. It is found on Lord Howe Island.
