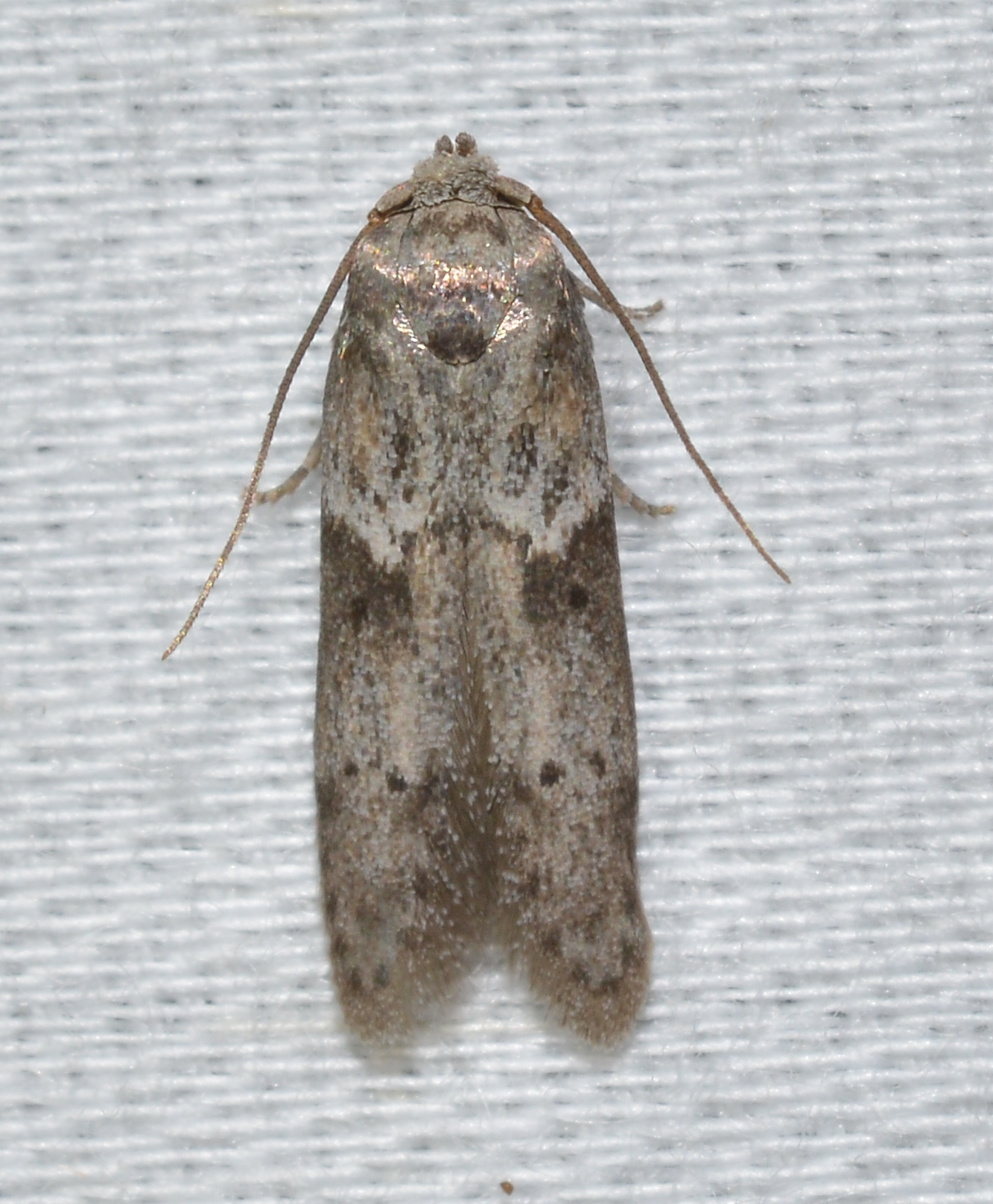
- Adult
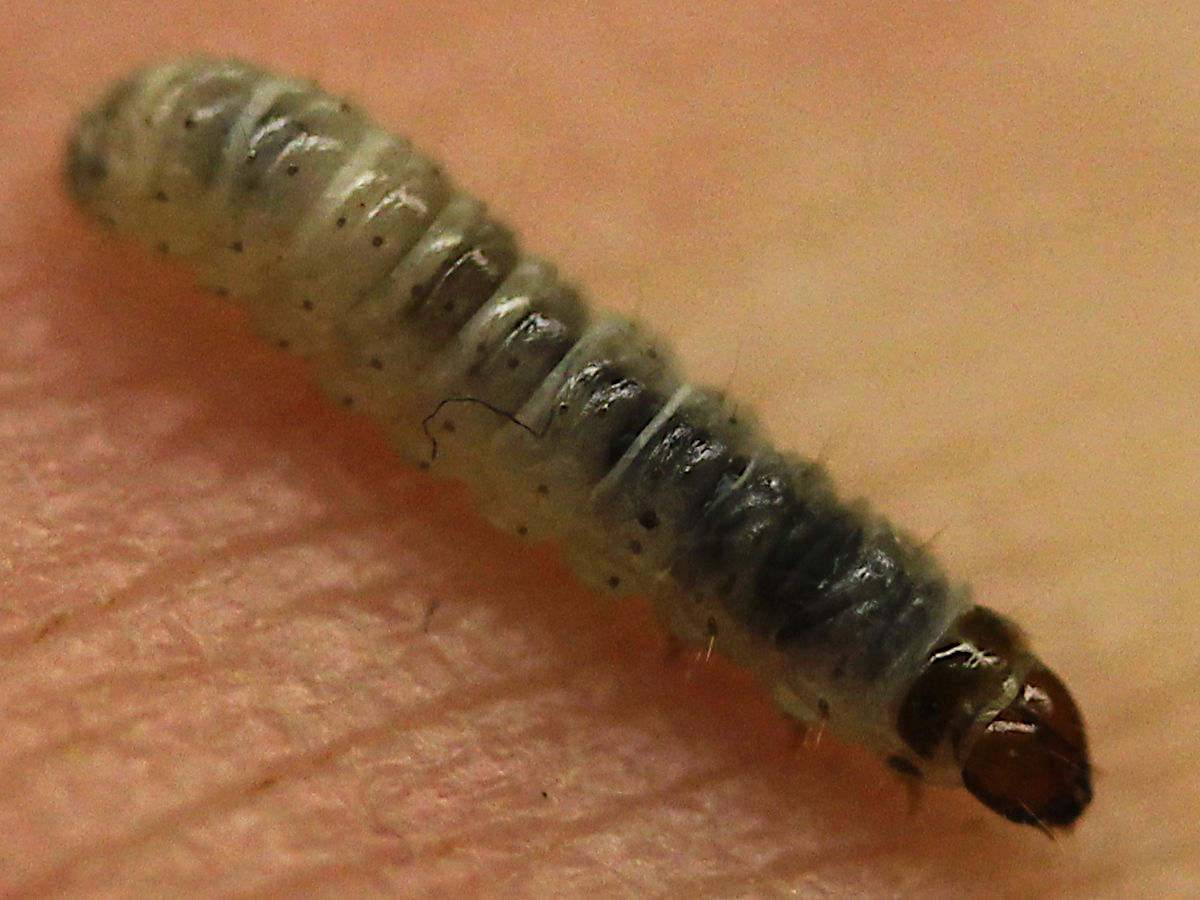
- Larva

Scientific classification
- Kingdom: Animalia
- Phylum: Arthropoda
- Clade: Pancrustacea
- Class: Insecta
- Order: Lepidoptera
- Family: Blastobasidae
- Genus: Blastobasis
- Species: B. glandulella

Binomial name
- Blastobasis glandulella (Riley, 1871)

Synonyms
- Gelechia glandulella Riley, 1871; Valentinia glandulella; Valentina glandulella; Holcocera modestella Clemens, 1863; Blastobasis nubilella Zeller, 1873; Blastobasis huemeri Sinev, 1993

= Blastobasis glandulella =

Species of moth

Blastobasis glandulella is a species of moth of the family Blastobasidae. It is found in the Eastern United States and southern Ontario, Canada. It has also been recorded in California. In Europe, it has been recorded from Austria, Germany, the Czech Republic, Italy, Slovakia and Croatia.

== Common name ==
It is commonly known as the acorn moth, but this can also refer to the tortrix moth Cydia splendana from Europe.

== Wings ==
The wingspan is 15–25 mm. They are on wing from April to September.

== Larvae ==
The larvae feed inside acorns and chestnuts.
