= Blastobasis moffetti =

Scientific classification
- Kingdom: Animalia
- Phylum: Arthropoda
- Clade: Pancrustacea
- Class: Insecta
- Order: Lepidoptera
- Family: Blastobasidae
- Genus: Blastobasis
- Species: B. moffetti

Binomial name
- Blastobasis moffetti Adamski & R.L. Brown, 2002

Species of moth in genus Blastobasis

Blastobasis moffetti is a moth in the family Blastobasidae. It is endemic to New Caledonia.

The length of the forewings is 7–7.8 mm (0.28–0.31 in) in males.
