= Blastobasis spermologa =

Scientific classification
- Kingdom: Animalia
- Phylum: Arthropoda
- Clade: Pancrustacea
- Class: Insecta
- Order: Lepidoptera
- Family: Blastobasidae
- Genus: Blastobasis
- Species: B. spermologa

Binomial name
- Blastobasis spermologa Meyrick, 1916

Species of moth in genus Blastobasis

Blastobasis spermologa is a moth in the family Blastobasidae. It is found in Sri Lanka and Taiwan.

The larvae feed within the seeds of Camellia sinensis.
