= Blastobasis lososi =

Scientific classification
- Kingdom: Animalia
- Phylum: Arthropoda
- Clade: Pancrustacea
- Class: Insecta
- Order: Lepidoptera
- Family: Blastobasidae
- Genus: Blastobasis
- Species: B. lososi

Binomial name
- Blastobasis lososi Adamski & R.L. Brown, 2002

Species of moth in genus Blastobasis

Blastobasis lososi is a moth in the family Blastobasidae that is endemic to Fiji.

The length of the forewings is 4.8 millimetres (0.19 in).

== Etymology ==
The species is named in honour of Joseph O. Losos.
