= Blastobasis desertarum =

Scientific classification
- Kingdom: Animalia
- Phylum: Arthropoda
- Clade: Pancrustacea
- Class: Insecta
- Order: Lepidoptera
- Family: Blastobasidae
- Genus: Blastobasis
- Species: B. desertarum

Binomial name
- Blastobasis desertarum (Wollaston, 1858)

Synonyms
- Coleophora desertarum Wollaston, 1858; Blastobasis maderensis Stainton, 1859; Coleophora miguelensis Rebel, 1940; Blastobasis radiata Walsingham, 1894

Species of moth in genus Blastobasis

Blastobasis desertarum is a moth in the family Blastobasidae. It is found on Madeira and the Azores.

It is regarded a pest on ornamental plants. The species was first recorded from greenhouses in Berlin in 2005, where it persists, despite control efforts. It has also been recorded outdoors from northern Italy. The larvae are polyphagous and have been recorded feeding on Dianthus caryophyllus, Polygonum maritimum, Aeonium, and other Crassulaceae species. They feed within the stem and tunnel in the roots of their host plant.
