= Blastobasis trachelista =

Scientific classification
- Kingdom: Animalia
- Phylum: Arthropoda
- Clade: Pancrustacea
- Class: Insecta
- Order: Lepidoptera
- Family: Blastobasidae
- Genus: Blastobasis
- Species: B. trachelista

Binomial name
- Blastobasis trachelista Meyrick, 1921

Synonyms
- Blastobasis trachilista Adamski, 2010 (lapsus)

Species of moth in genus Blastobasis

Blastobasis trachelista is a moth in the family Blastobasidae. It was described by Edward Meyrick in 1921. It is found in Zimbabwe.

The wingspan is about 13 mm. The forewings are greyish ochreous, more or less irrorated (sprinkled) with fuscous. The costal edge is dark fuscous towards the base and the discal stigmata are blackish, with a small additional dot beneath the second. The hindwings are grey.
