= Blastobasis chloroptris =

Scientific classification
- Kingdom: Animalia
- Phylum: Arthropoda
- Clade: Pancrustacea
- Class: Insecta
- Order: Lepidoptera
- Family: Blastobasidae
- Genus: Blastobasis
- Species: B. chloroptris

Binomial name
- Blastobasis chloroptris Meyrick, 1931

Species of moth in genus Blastobasis

Blastobasis chloroptris is a moth in the family Blastobasidae. It was described by Edward Meyrick in 1931. It is found in Malaysia.
