= Cydia splendana =

Chestnut tortrix

Scientific classification
- Kingdom: Animalia
- Phylum: Arthropoda
- Class: Insecta
- Order: Lepidoptera
- Family: Tortricidae
- Genus: Cydia
- Species: C. splendana

Binomial name
- Cydia splendana (Hübner, [1799])

Synonyms
- Tortrix splendana Hübner, [1799]; Laspeyresia splendana; Tinea bicolorana Geoffroy in Fourcroy, 1785; Tinea bicolorata Vives Moreno, 1991; Tortrix glandella Schrank, 1802; Tortrix pencleriana Werneburg, 1864; Tortrix penkleriana Denis & Schiffermüller, 1775; Carpocapsa reaumurana Heinemann, 1863

Chestnut and acorn moth

Cydia splendana, the chestnut tortrix, is a moth of the family Tortricidae. It is found in Europe. It is also known as the acorn moth, but this can also refer to Blastobasis glandulella from North America, which belongs to the more primitive family Blastobasidae.

The wingspan is 12–16 mm. The moth flies from May to September depending on the location.

The larvae feed on oak and sweet chestnut, and perhaps also Juglans species. The larvae develop mostly in mature chestnut fruits.
