= Blastobasis inderskella =

Scientific classification
- Kingdom: Animalia
- Phylum: Arthropoda
- Clade: Pancrustacea
- Class: Insecta
- Order: Lepidoptera
- Family: Blastobasidae
- Genus: Blastobasis
- Species: B. inderskella

Binomial name
- Blastobasis inderskella Caradja, 1920

Species of moth in genus Blastobasis

Blastobasis inderskella is a moth in the family Blastobasidae. It was described by Aristide Caradja in 1920. It is found in Uralsk, Russia.
