= Blastobasis monozona =

Scientific classification
- Kingdom: Animalia
- Phylum: Arthropoda
- Clade: Pancrustacea
- Class: Insecta
- Order: Lepidoptera
- Family: Blastobasidae
- Genus: Blastobasis
- Species: B. monozona

Binomial name
- Blastobasis monozona Lower, 1907

Species of moth in genus Blastobasis

Blastobasis monozona is a moth of the family Blastobasidae. It is found in Australia.
