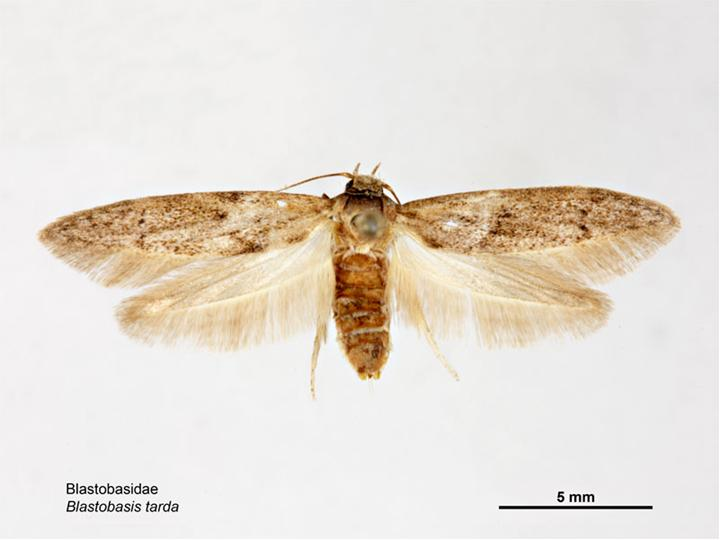
- Dorsal view
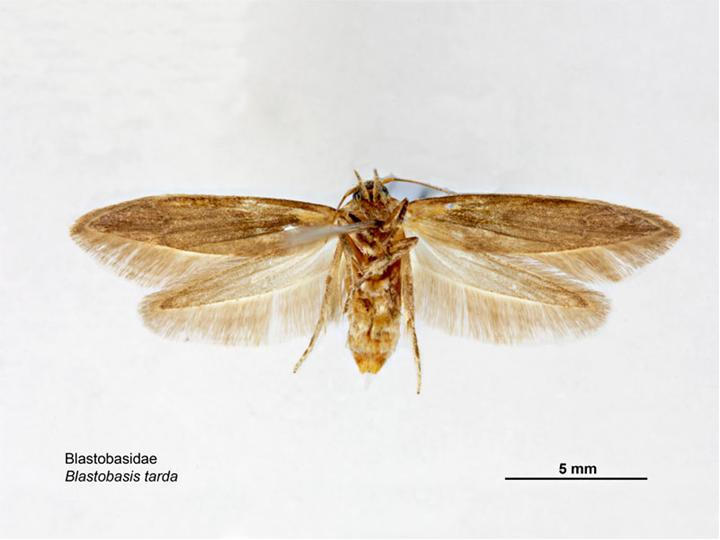
- Ventral view

Scientific classification
- Kingdom: Animalia
- Phylum: Arthropoda
- Clade: Pancrustacea
- Class: Insecta
- Order: Lepidoptera
- Family: Blastobasidae
- Genus: Blastobasis
- Species: B. tarda

Binomial name
- Blastobasis tarda Meyrick, 1902

Synonyms
- Neoblastobasis ligurica Nel & Varenne, 2004

= Blastobasis tarda =

Species of moth in genus Blastobasis

Blastobasis tarda is a moth of the family Blastobasidae. It is found in Australia in Queensland and New South Wales.. It is an introduced species in North America, where it has been found in southern California. It has also been reported from France. There is a species in New Zealand that is very similar in appearance to B. tarda that has yet to be formally described.

The wingspan is about 15 mm.
