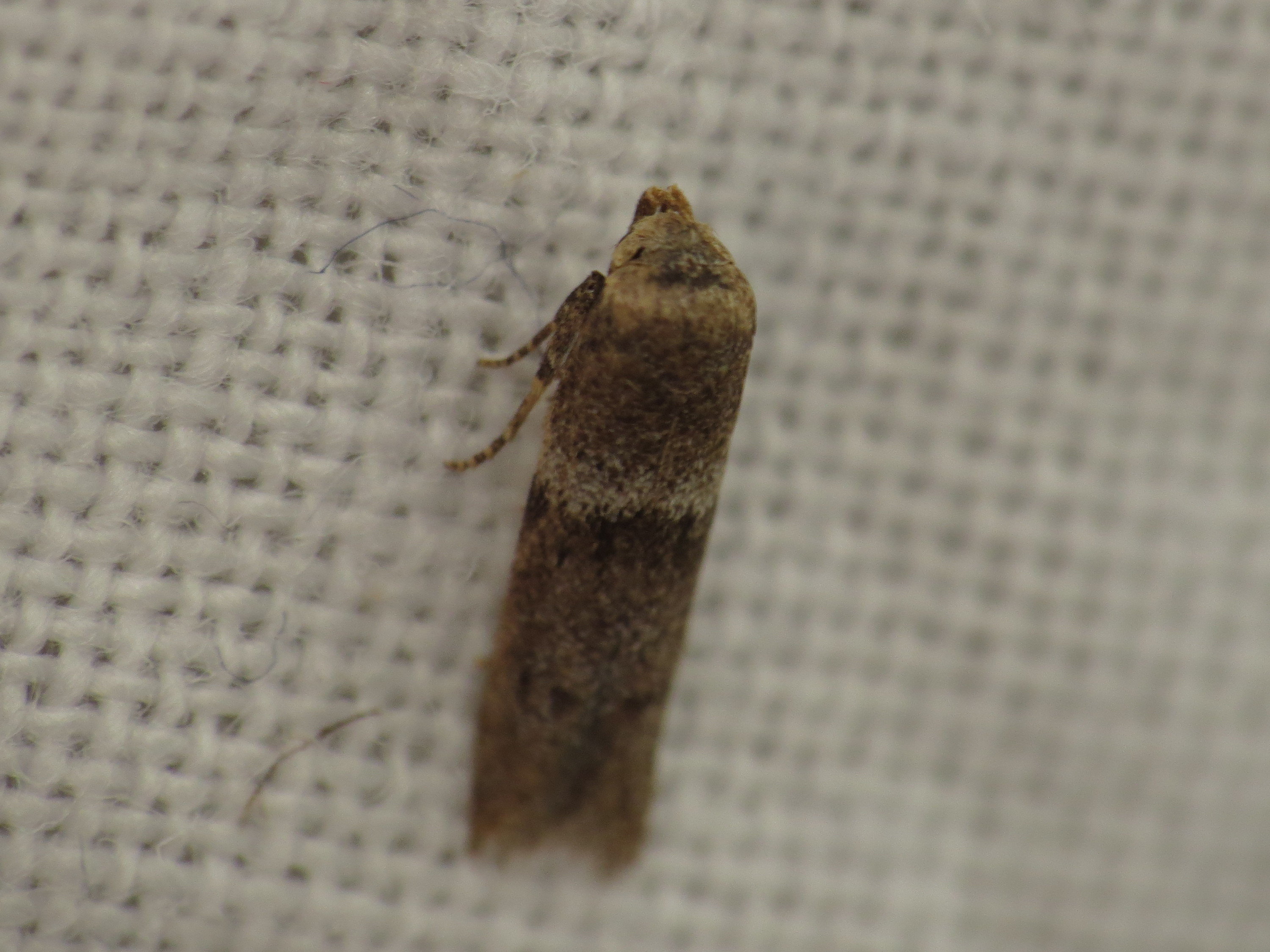

Scientific classification
- Kingdom: Animalia
- Phylum: Arthropoda
- Clade: Pancrustacea
- Class: Insecta
- Order: Lepidoptera
- Family: Blastobasidae
- Genus: Blastobasis
- Species: B. scotia

Binomial name
- Blastobasis scotia Turner, 1947

= Blastobasis scotia =

Species of moth in genus Blastobasis

Blastobasis scotia is a moth of the family Blastobasidae. It is found in Australia.
