= Blastobasis incuriosa =

Scientific classification
- Kingdom: Animalia
- Phylum: Arthropoda
- Clade: Pancrustacea
- Class: Insecta
- Order: Lepidoptera
- Family: Blastobasidae
- Genus: Blastobasis
- Species: B. incuriosa

Binomial name
- Blastobasis incuriosa Meyrick, 1916

Species of moth in genus Blastobasis

Blastobasis incuriosa is a moth of the family Blastobasidae. It is found in Australia.
