= Blastobasis homadelpha =

Scientific classification
- Kingdom: Animalia
- Phylum: Arthropoda
- Clade: Pancrustacea
- Class: Insecta
- Order: Lepidoptera
- Family: Blastobasidae
- Genus: Blastobasis
- Species: B. homadelpha

Binomial name
- Blastobasis homadelpha Meyrick, 1902

Species of moth in genus Blastobasis

Blastobasis homadelpha is a moth of the family Blastobasidae. It is found in Australia and Samoa.
