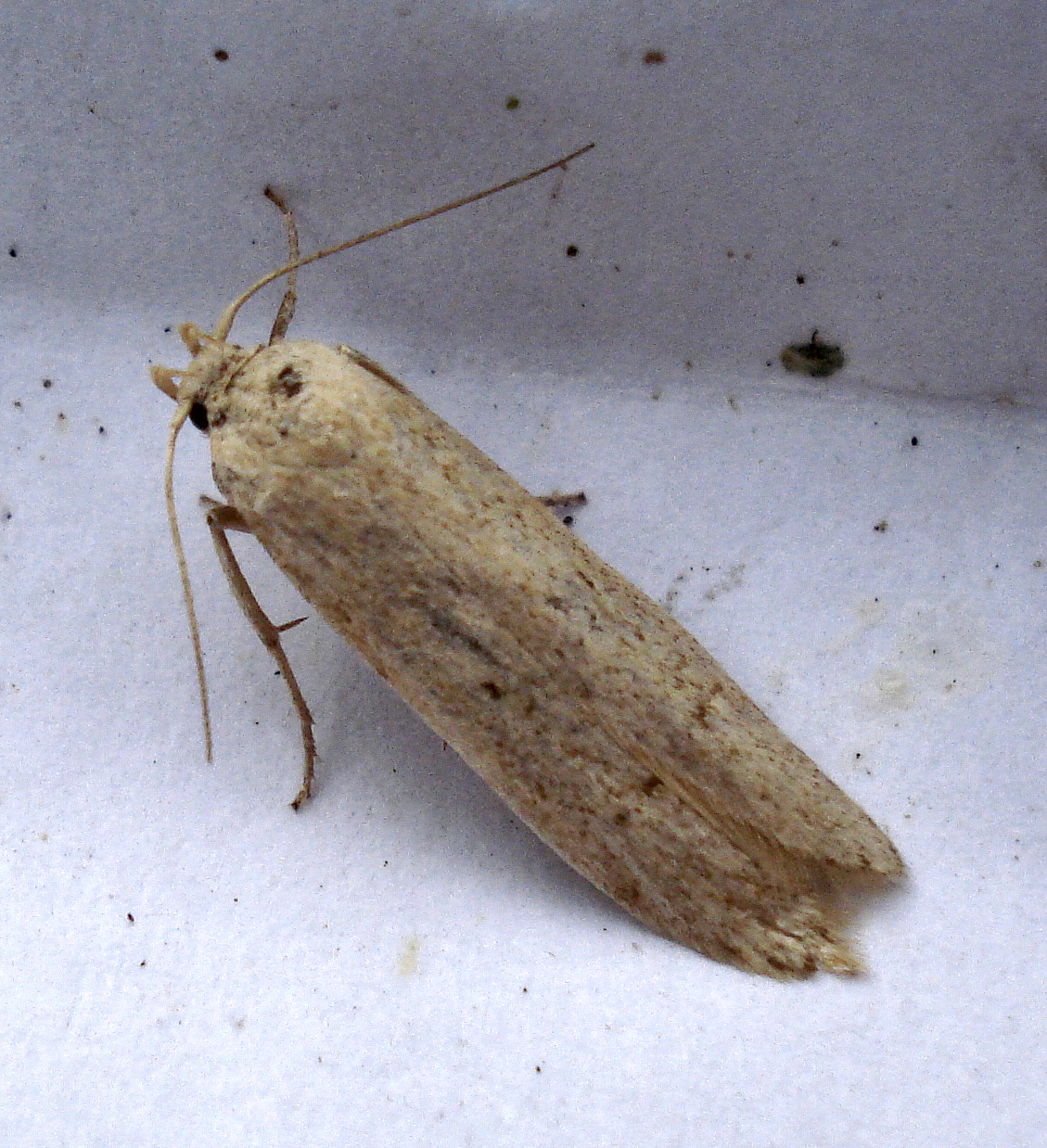

Scientific classification
- Kingdom: Animalia
- Phylum: Arthropoda
- Clade: Pancrustacea
- Class: Insecta
- Order: Lepidoptera
- Family: Blastobasidae
- Genus: Blastobasis
- Species: B. lacticolella

Binomial name
- Blastobasis lacticolella Rebel, 1939/1940

Synonyms
- Blastobasis decolorella auct.

= Blastobasis lacticolella =

Species of moth in genus Blastobasis

Blastobasis lacticolella is a species of moth of the family Blastobasidae. It is endemic to Madeira but has been introduced to western Europe and is now reported from the Netherlands, Great Britain, Ireland, and Sweden. It is widespread in southern England.

== Description ==
The wingspan is 15–23 mm. Adults are on wing from March to October (from May to June and again in autumn in the UK).

Larvae feed in a silken gallery, on a wide variety of unrelated food types, including leaf-litter, vegetation and stored products, such as:

- the shoots of tamarisk
- spongy oak galls
- moss
- hawthorn berries
- dead insects
- rosehips
- dried skin of apple.
