= Blastobasis tanyptera =

Scientific classification
- Kingdom: Animalia
- Phylum: Arthropoda
- Clade: Pancrustacea
- Class: Insecta
- Order: Lepidoptera
- Family: Blastobasidae
- Genus: Blastobasis
- Species: B. tanyptera

Binomial name
- Blastobasis tanyptera Turner, 1947

Species of moth in genus Blastobasis

Blastobasis tanyptera is a moth of the family Blastobasidae. It is found in Australia, including northern Queensland. It was first described in 1947 by Alfred Jefferis Turner, and the specific name, tanyptera, describes it as being "long winged".

The wingspan is 18–20 mm (0.71–0.79 in). The larvae feed within the fruits of Eugenia paniculata.
