= Blastobasis pentasticta =

Scientific classification
- Kingdom: Animalia
- Phylum: Arthropoda
- Clade: Pancrustacea
- Class: Insecta
- Order: Lepidoptera
- Family: Blastobasidae
- Genus: Blastobasis
- Species: B. pentasticta

Binomial name
- Blastobasis pentasticta Turner, 1947

Species of moth in genus Blastobasis

Blastobasis pentasticta is a moth of the family Blastobasidae. It is found in Australia, including New South Wales.

It was first described in 1947 by Alfred Jefferis Turner, and the species epithet, pentastica, describes it as being "five- spotted". It was described from a specimen found in Sydney in the month of February.
