= Blastobasis phaeopasta =

Scientific classification
- Kingdom: Animalia
- Phylum: Arthropoda
- Clade: Pancrustacea
- Class: Insecta
- Order: Lepidoptera
- Family: Blastobasidae
- Genus: Blastobasis
- Species: B. phaeopasta

Binomial name
- Blastobasis phaeopasta Turner, 1947

Species of moth in genus Blastobasis

Blastobasis phaeopasta is a moth of the family Blastobasidae. It is found in Australia, including northern Queensland. It was first described in 1947 by Alfred Jefferis Turner, and the species epithet, phaeopasta, describes it as being "darkly sprinkled".
