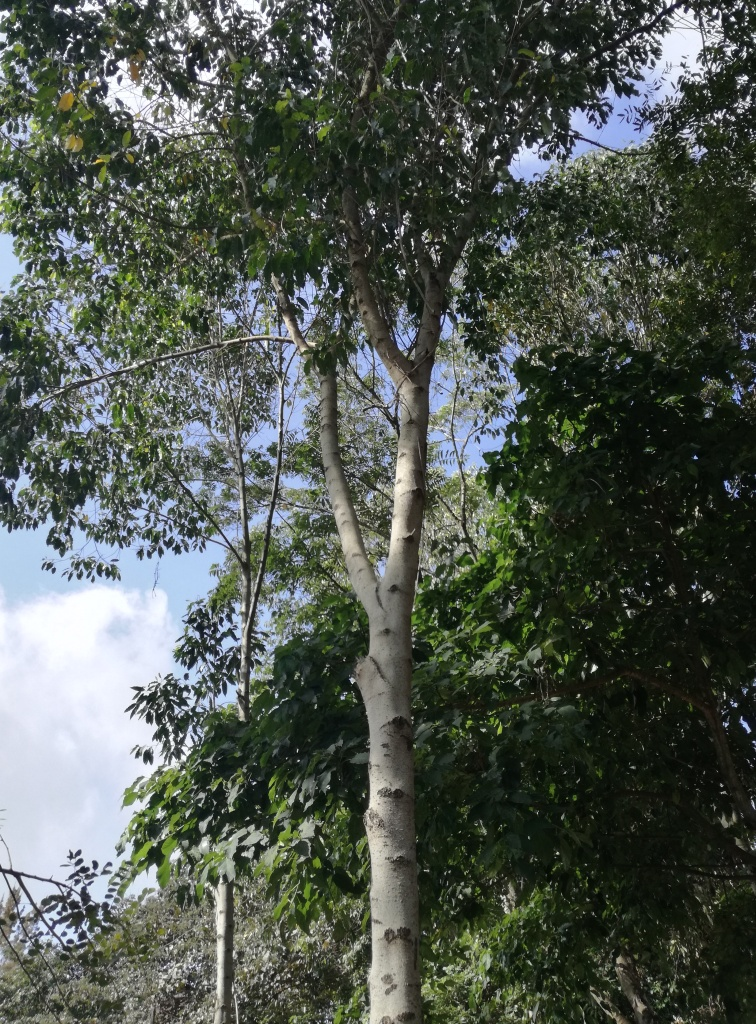

Scientific classification
- Kingdom: Plantae
- Clade: Tracheophytes
- Clade: Angiosperms
- Clade: Eudicots
- Clade: Asterids
- Order: Lamiales
- Family: Oleaceae
- Genus: Olea
- Species: O. welwitschii

Binomial name
- Olea welwitschii (Knobl.) Gilg & Schellenb. (1913)

Synonyms
- Linociera welwitschii (Knobl.) Knobl. (1895); Mayepea welwitschii Knobl. (1893); Olea capensis subsp. welwitschii (Knobl.) Friis & P.S.Green (1986); Olea mussolinii Chiov. (1940); Osmanthus welwitschii (Knobl.) Knobl. (1934); Steganthus welwitschii (Knobl.) Knobl. (1934)

= Olea welwitschii =

Species of tree

Olea welwitschii, the Elgon teak, is a species of tree in the family Oleaceae. It ranges across parts of subsaharan Africa, from Cameroon in the west to Ethiopia and Kenya in the east, and south to Angola, Zambia, and Mozambique. It is a forest species, ranging from lowland tropical rainforests to evergreen montane forests.

Olea welwitschii is evergreen, and can grow up to 35 meters in height. It is used locally and commercially for timber.

Olea welwitschii is sometimes classified as a subspecies of Olea capensis.

The species is named for botanist Friedrich Welwitsch.
