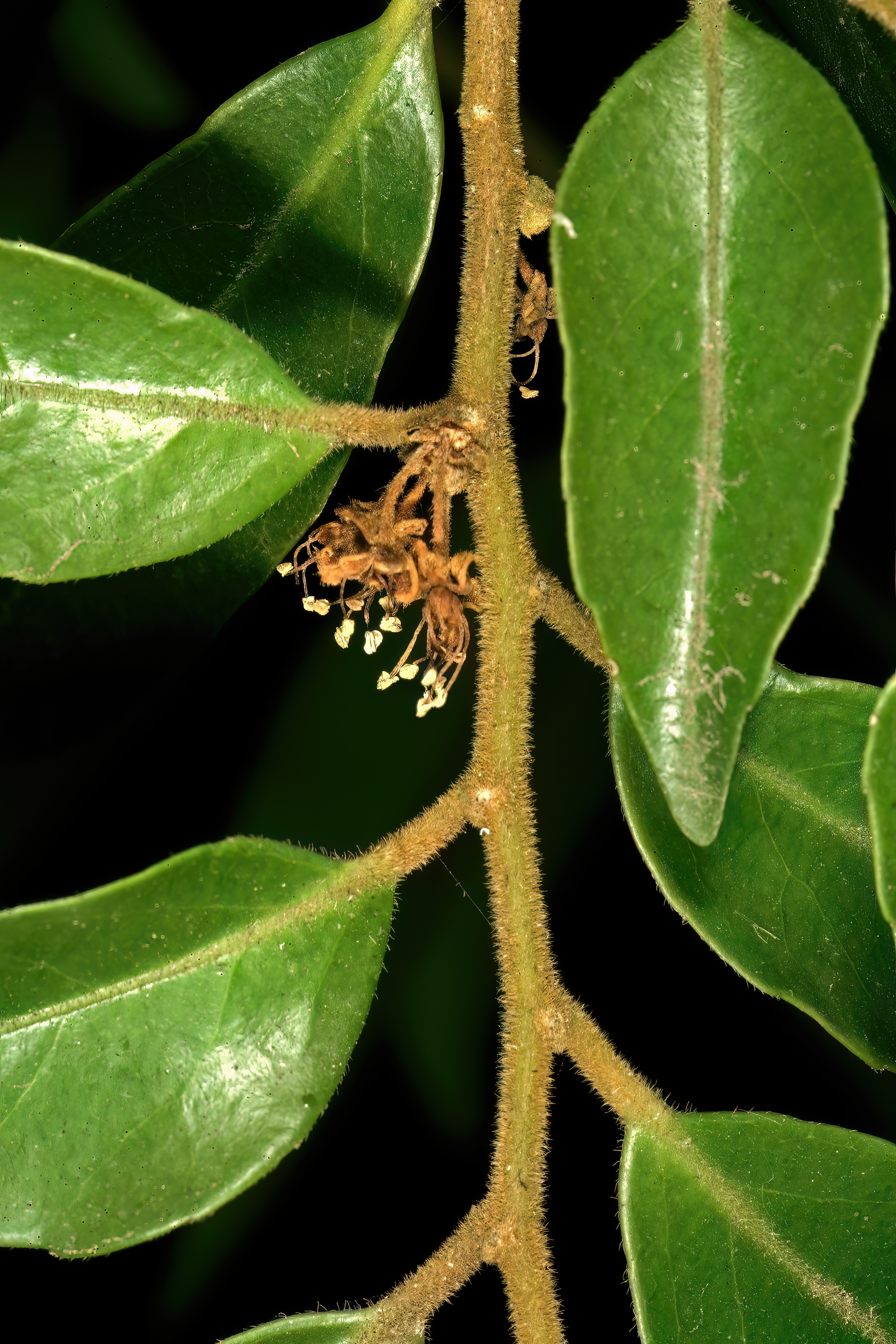
- At Umtamvuna Nature Reserve, South Africa

Conservation status
- Least Concern (IUCN 3.1)

Scientific classification
- Kingdom: Plantae
- Clade: Tracheophytes
- Clade: Angiosperms
- Clade: Eudicots
- Clade: Rosids
- Order: Malpighiales
- Family: Putranjivaceae
- Genus: Drypetes
- Species: D. gerrardii

Binomial name
- Drypetes gerrardii Hutch.

= Drypetes gerrardii =

Species of tree

Drypetes gerrardii is a species of small tree or large shrub in the family Putranjivaceae. Common names include forest ironplum, bastard white ironwood, and forest ironwood. It is native to tropical and subtropical central and eastern Africa. It was first described in 1920 by the English botanist John Hutchinson, who named it after the English botanist William Tyrer Gerrard who collected plants and seeds in southern Africa in the 1860s.

== Description ==
Drypetes gerrardii is a small tree or large evergreen shrub, growing to a height of about 20 m (66 ft). The trunk is fluted and buttressed in larger trees, and the bark is smooth. Small branches and twigs are squarish in cross section and are clad in golden hairs when young. The leaves are alternate and held in one plane. The blades are ovate to elliptic and up to 15 cm (6 in) long, shiny dark green above and pale green below with a felting of pale hairs on the leaf stalk and the midrib. The leaf margin is entire or lightly toothed and the tip acute or acuminate. Male and female flowers are found on separate trees; they are small, yellowish-white and hairy, male flowers being in a group in the axil of a leaf, and female flowers being solitary. The fruits are fleshy, hairy, spherical drupes up to 1.5 cm (0.6 in) in diameter, ripening to a yellow or orange-red colour.

== Distribution and habitat ==
This tree is native to Central and Eastern Africa, where its range extends from South Sudan, Uganda and Kenya, southwards to Angola, eastern South Africa and Eswatini. In South Africa it is found in the Eastern Cape, KwaZulu-Natal, Limpopo and Mpumalanga provinces. It grows in drier evergreen forests, in riverine corridor forests, and sometimes in wetter rain forests, as well as in scrubby habitats, at altitudes between 600 and 2,300 m (2,000 and 7,500 ft).

== Uses ==
As a small tree, the timber of Drypetes gerrardii is not traded but is used locally for poles, tool handles, furniture, utensils and pestles. It is also used as firewood and for making charcoal. The flowers are nectar-rich and attract honeybees and the fruit is edible. The tree has limited use in traditional medicine, a decoction prepared from the roots being used for abdominal pain and powdered leaves and roots being used to treat gonorrhea. The tree is sometimes grown to provide shade.

== Status ==
The conservation status of this tree is said to be of "least concern" in South Africa. It is in general a common tree in dry evergreen forests.
