= List of Lepidoptera of Madeira =

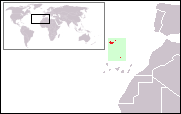
Location of Madeira

The Lepidoptera of Madeira consist of both the butterflies and moths recorded from the island of Madeira.

According to a recent estimate, there are 324 Lepidoptera species in Madeira.

== Butterflies ==
=== Lycaenidae ===
- Lampides boeticus (Linnaeus, 1767)
- Lycaena phlaeas (Linnaeus, 1761)

=== Nymphalidae ===
- Danaus plexippus (Linnaeus, 1758)
- Hipparchia maderensis (Bethune-Baker, 1891)
- Hypolimnas misippus (Linnaeus, 1764)
- Issoria lathonia (Linnaeus, 1758)
- Pararge aegeria (Linnaeus, 1758)
- Pararge xiphia (Fabricius, 1775)
- Vanessa atalanta (Linnaeus, 1758)
- Vanessa cardui (Linnaeus, 1758)
- Vanessa vulcania (Godart, 1819)

=== Pieridae ===
- Colias croceus (Fourcroy, 1785)
- Gonepteryx maderensis Felder, 1862
- Pieris brassicae (Linnaeus, 1758)
- Pieris rapae (Linnaeus, 1758)
- Pieris wollastoni (Butler, 1886)

== Moths ==
=== Autostichidae ===
- Apatema fasciata (Stainton, 1859)
- Dysallomima coarctella (Rebel, 1896)
- Oecia oecophila (Staudinger, 1876)

=== Bedelliidae ===
- Bedellia somnulentella (Zeller, 1847)

=== Blastobasidae ===
- Blastobasis adustella Walsingham, 1894
- Blastobasis bassii Sinev & Karsholt, 2004
- Blastobasis decolorella (Wollaston, 1858)
- Blastobasis desertarum (Wollaston, 1858)
- Blastobasis divisus (Walsingham, 1894)
- Blastobasis insularis (Wollaston, 1858)
- Blastobasis lacticolella Rebel, 1940
- Blastobasis laurisilvae Sinev & Karsholt, 2004
- Blastobasis lavernella Walsingham, 1894
- Blastobasis luteella Sinev & Karsholt, 2004
- Blastobasis marmorosella (Wollaston, 1858)
- Blastobasis maroccanella Amsel, 1952
- Blastobasis nigromaculata (Wollaston, 1858)
- Blastobasis ochreopalpella (Wollaston, 1858)
- Blastobasis pica (Walsingham, 1894)
- Blastobasis rebeli Sinev & Karsholt, 2004
- Blastobasis salebrosella Rebel, 1940
- Blastobasis serradaguae Sinev & Karsholt, 2004
- Blastobasis spectabilella Rebel, 1940
- Blastobasis splendens Sinev & Karsholt, 2004
- Blastobasis subdivisus Sinev & Karsholt, 2004
- Blastobasis virgatella Sinev & Karsholt, 2004
- Blastobasis vittata (Wollaston, 1858)
- Blastobasis walsinghami Sinev & Karsholt, 2004
- Blastobasis wolffi Sinev & Karsholt, 2004
- Blastobasis wollastoni Sinev & Karsholt, 2004

=== Carposinidae ===
- Carposina anopta Diakonoff, 1990
- Carposina atlanticella Rebel, 1894

=== Choreutidae ===
- Anthophila fabriciana (Linnaeus, 1767)
- Anthophila threnodes (Walsingham, 1910)
- Choreutis nemorana (Hübner, 1799)
- Tebenna micalis (Mann, 1857)

=== Coleophoridae ===
- Coleophora coracipennella (Hübner, 1796)
- Coleophora glaucicolella Wood, 1892
- Coleophora versurella Zeller, 1849

=== Cosmopterigidae ===
- Ascalenia echidnias (Meyrick, 1891)
- Cosmopterix attenuatella (Walker, 1864)
- Cosmopterix pulchrimella Chambers, 1875
- Pyroderces argyrogrammos (Zeller, 1847)

=== Crambidae ===
- Agriphila atlanticus (Wollaston, 1858)
- Agriphila trabeatellus (Herrich-Schäffer, 1848)
- Antigastra catalaunalis (Duponchel, 1833)
- Aporodes floralis (Hübner, 1809)
- Botyodes diniasalis (Walker, 1859)
- Cynaeda dentalis (Denis & Schiffermuller, 1775)
- Diaphania indica (Saunders, 1851)
- Diasemiopsis ramburialis (Duponchel, 1834)
- Duponchelia fovealis Zeller, 1847
- Euchromius cambridgei (Zeller, 1867)
- Euchromius ocellea (Haworth, 1811)
- Eudonia angustea (Curtis, 1827)
- Eudonia decorella (Stainton, 1859)
- Eudonia scoriella (Wollaston, 1858)
- Eudonia shafferi Nuss, Karsholt & Meyer, 1998
- Eudonia stenota (Wollaston, 1858)
- Evergestis isatidalis (Duponchel, 1833)
- Hellula undalis (Fabricius, 1781)
- Herpetogramma bipunctalis (Fabricius, 1794)
- Herpetogramma licarsisalis (Walker, 1859)
- Hodebertia testalis (Fabricius, 1794)
- Mecyna asinalis (Hübner, 1819)
- Mecyna atlanticum (Bethune-Baker, 1894)
- Nomophila noctuella (Denis & Schiffermuller, 1775)
- Palpita vitrealis (Rossi, 1794)
- Pyrausta sanguinalis (Linnaeus, 1767)
- Spoladea recurvalis (Fabricius, 1775)
- Trichophysetis whitei Rebel, 1906
- Udea ferrugalis (Hübner, 1796)
- Udea maderensis (Bethune-Baker, 1894)
- Udea numeralis (Hübner, 1796)
- Uresiphita gilvata (Fabricius, 1794)

=== Elachistidae ===
- Agonopterix heracliana (Linnaeus, 1758)
- Agonopterix perezi Walsingham, 1908
- Agonopterix scopariella (Heinemann, 1870)
- Depressaria daucella (Denis & Schiffermuller, 1775)
- Depressaria ultimella Stainton, 1849
- Elachista encumeadae Kaila & Karsholt, 2002
- Ethmia bipunctella (Fabricius, 1775)
- Exaeretia conciliatella (Rebel, 1892)
- Perittia carlinella (Walsingham, 1908)

=== Epermeniidae ===
- Epermenia aequidentellus (E. Hofmann, 1867)

=== Erebidae ===
- Autophila dilucida (Hübner, 1808)
- Eublemma ostrina (Hübner, 1808)
- Eublemma parva (Hübner, 1808)
- Hypena lividalis (Hübner, 1796)
- Hypena obsitalis (Hübner, 1813)
- Ophiusa tirhaca (Cramer, 1773)
- Schrankia costaestrigalis (Stephens, 1834)
- Scoliopteryx libatrix (Linnaeus, 1758)
- Tathorhynchus exsiccata (Lederer, 1855)
- Utetheisa pulchella (Linnaeus, 1758)

=== Gelechiidae ===
- Aproaerema anthyllidella (Hübner, 1813)
- Bryotropha domestica (Haworth, 1828)
- Bryotropha plebejella (Zeller, 1847)
- Caryocolum marmorea (Haworth, 1828)
- Caryocolum sciurella (Walsingham, 1908)
- Chrysoesthia drurella (Fabricius, 1775)
- Dichomeris acuminatus (Staudinger, 1876)
- Ephysteris brachyptera Karsholt & Sattler, 1998
- Ephysteris promptella (Staudinger, 1859)
- Helcystogramma convolvuli (Walsingham, 1908)
- Microlechia chretieni Turati, 1924
- Ornativalva plutelliformis (Staudinger, 1859)
- Phthorimaea operculella (Zeller, 1873)
- Platyedra subcinerea (Haworth, 1828)
- Scrobipalpa ergasima (Meyrick, 1916)
- Scrobipalpa ocellatella (Boyd, 1858)
- Scrobipalpa portosanctana (Stainton, 1859)
- Scrobipalpa suaedicola (Mabille, 1906)
- Scrobipalpa vasconiella (Rossler, 1877)
- Sitotroga cerealella (Olivier, 1789)
- Syncopacma polychromella (Rebel, 1902)
- Thiotricha wollastoni (Walsingham, 1884)

=== Geometridae ===
- Ascotis fortunata (Blachier, 1887)
- Costaconvexa centrostrigaria (Wollaston, 1858)
- Cyclophora maderensis (Bethune-Baker, 1891)
- Cyclophora puppillaria (Hübner, 1799)
- Eupithecia latipennata Prout, 1914
- Eupithecia massiliata Milliere, 1865
- Eupithecia rosai Pinker, 1962
- Gymnoscelis rufifasciata (Haworth, 1809)
- Herbulotina maderae Pinker, 1971
- Idaea atlantica (Stainton, 1859)
- Idaea maderae (Bethune-Baker, 1891)
- Menophra maderae (Bethune-Baker, 1891)
- Nycterosea obstipata (Fabricius, 1794)
- Rhodometra sacraria (Linnaeus, 1767)
- Scopula irrorata (Bethune-Baker, 1891)
- Xanthorhoe rupicola (Wollaston, 1858)
- Xenochlorodes magna Wolff, 1977
- Xenochlorodes nubigena (Wollaston, 1858)

=== Glyphipterigidae ===
- Acrolepiopsis infundibulosa Gaedike & Karsholt, 2001
- Acrolepiopsis mauli Gaedike & Karsholt, 2001
- Acrolepiopsis vesperella (Zeller, 1850)
- Glyphipterix diaphora Walsingham, 1894
- Glyphipterix pygmaeella Rebel, 1896

=== Gracillariidae ===
- Caloptilia aurantiaca (Wollaston, 1858)
- Caloptilia azaleella (Brants, 1913)
- Caloptilia coruscans (Walsingham, 1907)
- Caloptilia laurifoliae (M. Hering, 1927)
- Caloptilia staintoni (Wollaston, 1858)
- Dialectica hedemanni (Rebel, 1896)
- Dialectica scalariella (Zeller, 1850)
- Phyllocnistis canariensis M. Hering, 1927
- Phyllocnistis citrella Stainton, 1856
- Phyllonorycter chiclanella (Staudinger, 1859)
- Phyllonorycter juncei (Walsingham, 1908)
- Phyllonorycter mespilella (Hübner, 1805)
- Phyllonorycter messaniella (Zeller, 1846)
- Phyllonorycter myricae Deschka, 1976
- Phyllonorycter platani (Staudinger, 1870)

=== Lyonetiidae ===
- Leucoptera malifoliella (O. Costa, 1836)

=== Nepticulidae ===
- Stigmella atricapitella (Haworth, 1828)
- Stigmella aurella (Fabricius, 1775)
- Stigmella centifoliella (Zeller, 1848)
- Trifurcula ridiculosa (Walsingham, 1908)

=== Noctuidae ===
- Acontia lucida (Hufnagel, 1766)
- Agrotis atrux (Pinker, 1971)
- Agrotis fortunata Draudt, 1938
- Agrotis herzogi Rebel, 1911
- Agrotis ipsilon (Hufnagel, 1766)
- Agrotis rutae Rebel, 1939
- Agrotis segetum (Denis & Schiffermuller, 1775)
- Agrotis spinifera (Hübner, 1808)
- Agrotis trux (Hübner, 1824)
- Anarta trifolii (Hufnagel, 1766)
- Autographa gamma (Linnaeus, 1758)
- Callopistria latreillei (Duponchel, 1827)
- Caradrina clavipalpis Scopoli, 1763
- Chrysodeixis acuta (Walker, 1858)
- Chrysodeixis chalcites (Esper, 1789)
- Condica capensis (Walker, 1857)
- Cornutiplusia circumflexa (Linnaeus, 1767)
- Ctenoplusia limbirena (Guenee, 1852)
- Cucullia calendulae Treitschke, 1835
- Euplexia dubiosa (Bethune-Baker, 1891)
- Euxoa canariensis Rebel, 1902
- Galgula partita Guenee, 1852
- Hadena atlantica (Hampson, 1905)
- Hadena karsholti Hacker, 1995
- Hecatera maderae Bethune-Baker, 1891
- Helicoverpa armigera (Hübner, 1808)
- Heliothis peltigera (Denis & Schiffermuller, 1775)
- Leucania loreyi (Duponchel, 1827)
- Luperina madeirae Fibiger, 2005
- Mesapamea maderensis Pinker, 1971
- Mniotype albostigmata (Bethune-Baker, 1891)
- Mniotype inexpectata (Weidlich, 2001)
- Mythimna serradagua Wolff, 1977
- Mythimna vitellina (Hübner, 1808)
- Mythimna unipuncta (Haworth, 1809)
- Noctua pronuba (Linnaeus, 1758)
- Noctua teixeirai Pinker, 1971
- Nyctobrya maderensis Bethune-Baker, 1891
- Ochropleura leucogaster (Freyer, 1831)
- Peridroma saucia (Hübner, 1808)
- Phlogophora meticulosa (Linnaeus, 1758)
- Phlogophora wollastoni Bethune-Baker, 1891
- Sesamia nonagrioides Lefebvre, 1827
- Spodoptera cilium Guenee, 1852
- Spodoptera exigua (Hübner, 1808)
- Spodoptera littoralis (Boisduval, 1833)
- Thysanoplusia orichalcea (Fabricius, 1775)
- Trichoplusia ni (Hübner, 1803)
- Xestia c-nigrum (Linnaeus, 1758)
- Xylena exsoleta (Linnaeus, 1758)

=== Nolidae ===
- Earias insulana (Boisduval, 1833)

=== Oecophoridae ===
- Endrosis sarcitrella (Linnaeus, 1758)
- Esperia sulphurella (Fabricius, 1775)
- Hofmannophila pseudospretella (Stainton, 1849)

=== Plutellidae ===
- Plutella xylostella (Linnaeus, 1758)

=== Praydidae ===
- Prays citri (Milliere, 1873)
- Prays friesei Klimesch, 1992

=== Psychidae ===
- Apterona helicoidella (Vallot, 1827)
- Luffia lapidella (Goeze, 1783)

=== Pterophoridae ===
- Agdistis pseudocanariensis Arenberger, 1973
- Agdistis tamaricis (Zeller, 1847)
- Amblyptilia acanthadactyla (Hübner, 1813)
- Crombrugghia laetus (Zeller, 1847)
- Emmelina monodactyla (Linnaeus, 1758)
- Gypsochares nielswolffi Gielis & Arenberger, 1992
- Lantanophaga pusillidactylus (Walker, 1864)
- Merrifieldia bystropogonis (Walsingham, 1908)
- Stenoptilia bipunctidactyla (Scopoli, 1763)
- Stenoptilodes taprobanes (Felder & Rogenhofer, 1875)

=== Pyralidae ===
- Achroia grisella (Fabricius, 1794)
- Aglossa caprealis (Hübner, 1809)
- Ancylosis convexella (Lederer, 1855)
- Ancylosis roscidella (Eversmann, 1844)
- Cadra cautella (Walker, 1863)
- Cadra figulilella (Gregson, 1871)
- Cryptoblabes gnidiella (Milliere, 1867)
- Ematheudes punctella (Treitschke, 1833)
- Ephestia elutella (Hübner, 1796)
- Ephestia kuehniella Zeller, 1879
- Galleria mellonella (Linnaeus, 1758)
- Nephopterix angustella (Hübner, 1796)
- Neurotomia coenulentella (Zeller, 1846)
- Pararotruda nesiotica (Rebel, 1911)
- Pempelia lundbladi Rebel, 1939
- Plodia interpunctella (Hübner, 1813)
- Pyralis farinalis (Linnaeus, 1758)
- Raphimetopus ablutella (Zeller, 1839)

=== Sesiidae ===
- Synanthedon myopaeformis (Borkhausen, 1789)

=== Sphingidae ===
- Acherontia atropos (Linnaeus, 1758)
- Agrius convolvuli (Linnaeus, 1758)
- Hippotion celerio (Linnaeus, 1758)
- Hyles livornica (Esper, 1780)
- Hyles tithymali (Boisduval, 1834)
- Macroglossum stellatarum (Linnaeus, 1758)

=== Stathmopodidae ===
- Neomariania rebeli (Walsingham, 1894)

=== Tineidae ===
- Ceratobia oxymora (Meyrick, 1919)
- Monopis barbarosi (Kocak, 1981)
- Monopis crocicapitella (Clemens, 1859)
- Monopis henderickxi Gaedike & Karsholt, 2001
- Monopis nigricantella (Milliere, 1872)
- Niditinea fuscella (Linnaeus, 1758)
- Oinophila v-flava (Haworth, 1828)
- Opogona omoscopa (Meyrick, 1893)
- Opogona sacchari (Bojer, 1856)
- Phereoeca allutella (Rebel, 1892)
- Praeacedes atomosella (Walker, 1863)
- Psychoides filicivora (Meyrick, 1937)
- Stenoptinea cyaneimarmorella (Milliere, 1854)
- Tenaga nigripunctella (Haworth, 1828)
- Tinea dubiella Stainton, 1859
- Tinea murariella Staudinger, 1859
- Tinea trinotella Thunberg, 1794
- Tineola bisselliella (Hummel, 1823)
- Trichophaga robinsoni Gaedike & Karsholt, 2001
- Trichophaga tapetzella (Linnaeus, 1758)

=== Tortricidae ===
- Acleris variegana (Denis & Schiffermuller, 1775)
- Acroclita anelpista Diakonoff & Wolff, 1976
- Acroclita guanchana Walsingham, 1908
- Acroclita subsequana (Herrich-Schäffer, 1851)
- Aethes francillana (Fabricius, 1794)
- Bactra lancealana (Hübner, 1799)
- Bactra venosana (Zeller, 1847)
- Bactra minima Meyrick, 1909
- Cacoecimorpha pronubana (Hübner, 1799)
- Clavigesta sylvestrana (Curtis, 1850)
- Clepsis retiferana (Stainton, 1859)
- Clepsis staintoni Obraztsov, 1955
- Clepsis subcostana (Stainton, 1859)
- Clepsis subjunctana (Wollaston, 1858)
- Clepsis uncisecta Razowski & Wolff, 2000
- Cochylimorpha decolorella (Zeller, 1839)
- Crocidosema plebejana Zeller, 1847
- Cydia archaeochrysa Diakonoff, 1986
- Cydia pomonella (Linnaeus, 1758)
- Cydia splendana (Hübner, 1799)
- Epinotia thapsiana (Zeller, 1847)
- Eucosma cana (Haworth, 1811)
- Gypsonoma minutana (Hübner, 1799)
- Lobesia neptunia (Walsingham, 1908)
- Platynota rostrana (Walker, 1863)
- Rhyacionia buoliana (Denis & Schiffermuller, 1775)
- Selania leplastriana (Curtis, 1831)
- Spilonota ocellana (Denis & Schiffermuller, 1775)
- Thiodia glandulosana Walsingham, 1908

=== Yponomeutidae ===
- Parahyponomeuta bakeri (Walsingham, 1894)
- Zelleria oleastrella (Milliere, 1864)
- Zelleria wolffi Klimesch, 1983
