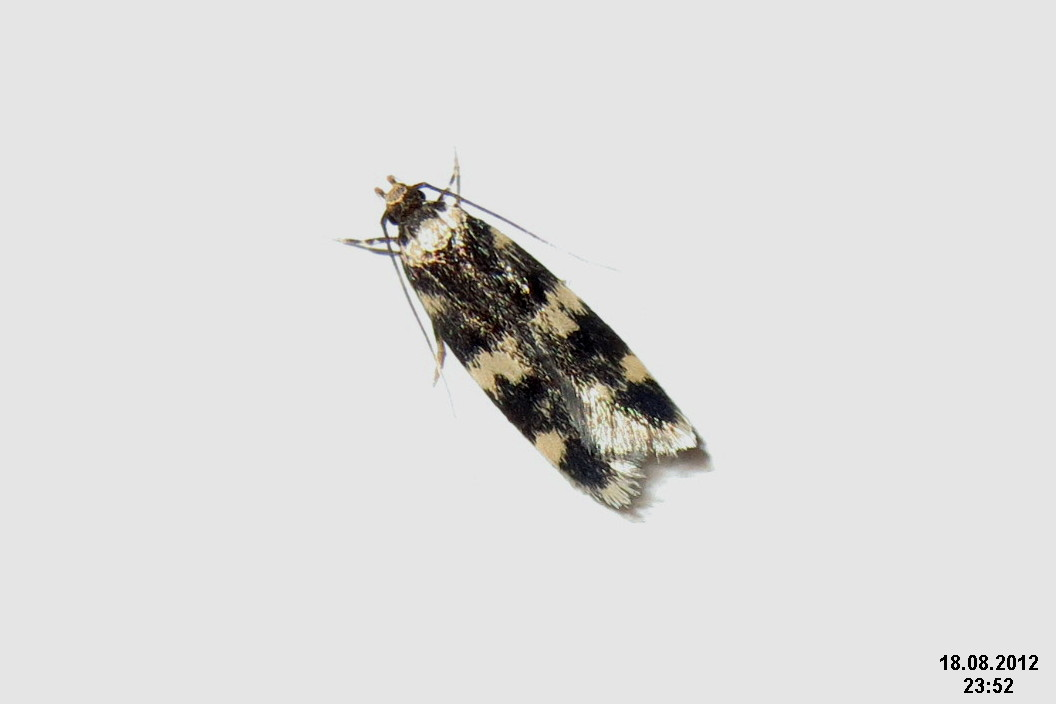

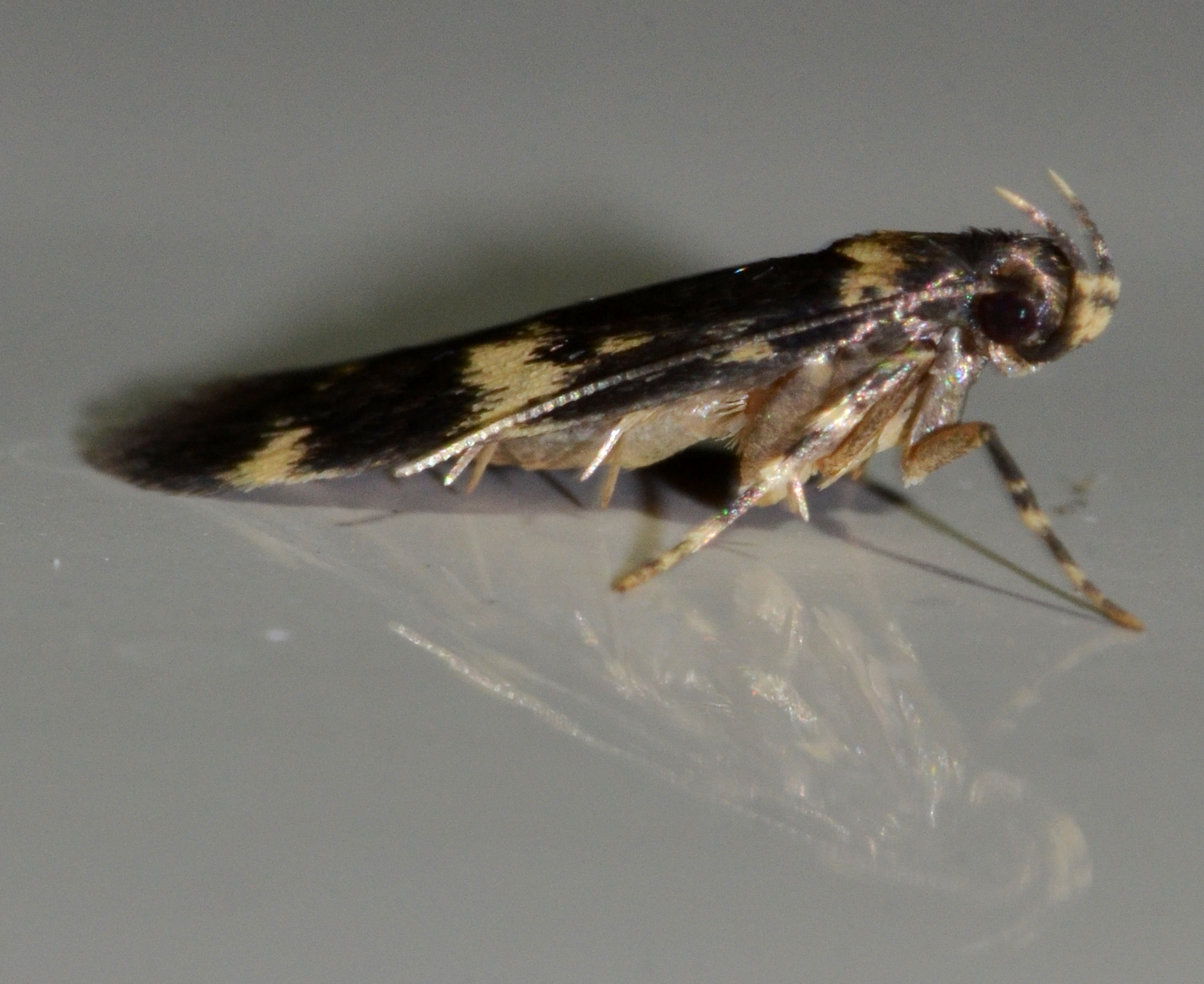

Scientific classification
- Kingdom: Animalia
- Phylum: Arthropoda
- Clade: Pancrustacea
- Class: Insecta
- Order: Lepidoptera
- Family: Autostichidae
- Genus: Oegoconia
- Species: O. quadripuncta

Binomial name
- Oegoconia quadripuncta (Haworth, 1828)

Synonyms
- Recurvaria quadripuncta Haworth, 1828; Oecophora deauratella Stainton, 1849; Anacampsis bifasciella Stephens, 1835; Lampros kindermanniella Herrich-Schäffer, 1855; ?Symmoca novimundi Busck, 1915

= Oegoconia quadripuncta =

Four-spotted yellowneck

Species of moth

The four-spotted yellowneck (Oegoconia quadripuncta), also known as the leaf litter moth, is a species of gelechioid moth. It is native to Western Europe, from France to Belgium, Germany and Austria, south to the Iberian Peninsula, and north to Ireland, Wales and England (where its northern limit is Lancashire). Older sources claim its range to extend further eastwards, but this seems to be based on misidentifications of related and very similar species (e.g. O. deauratella and O. caradjai). It is also found in southern Canada and throughout the United States.

== Description and ecology ==
The adults fly from May to August in North America and around July/August in Europe, depending on the location. They are nocturnal but can be attracted by light. The wingspan is 11–17 mm, and it is generally blackish, with two light yellow spots or bands on each forewing and a light yellow pronotum region – the common name "four-spotted yellowneck" refers to this pattern. But related species have a similar or identical pattern, and in some cases (e.g. O. deauratella) can only be distinguished by microscopic examination of the genitalia. The caterpillars live in leaf litter and eat detritus such as rotting wood.

== Systematics and taxonomy ==
It belongs to the subfamily Symmocinae, which is sometimes included in the case-bearers (Coleophoridae) or united with the concealer moth subfamily Autostichinae. Originally described as Recurvaria quadripuncta by A.H. Haworth in 1828, the four-spotted yellowneck is the type species of the genus Oegoconia, which in turn is the type genus of the symmocid subfamily Oegoconiinae (or tribe Oegoconiini, if the symmocids are merged into another family).

This species has been confused with its extremely similar but reproductively isolated congener O. deauratella. This is because O. quadripuncta has a junior synonym Oecophora deauratella (established by H.T. Stainton in 1849), while the actual O. deauratella was described (as Lampros deauratella) by G.A.W. Herrich-Schäffer only in 1854. Technically, in such a case Herrich-Schäffer's younger taxon should be displaced by Stainton's. But since the latter was synonymized with Haworth's taxon before they were all moved to Oegoconia, Herrich-Schäffer's name is not a junior homonym and can be used.
