= Oegoconiinae =

Scientific classification
- Domain: Eukaryota
- Kingdom: Animalia
- Phylum: Arthropoda
- Class: Insecta
- Order: Lepidoptera
- Family: Autostichidae
- Subfamily: Oegoconiinae; Leraut, 1992

Genera
- See text

Synonyms
- Oegoconiini

Subfamily of moths

Oegoconiinae is a subfamily of moths in the family Autostichidae.

== Taxonomy and systematics ==
- Apatema Walsingham, 1900
- Apateona Gozmány, 2008
- Dysallomima Gozmány, 2008
- Oegoconia Stainton, 1854

== Former genera ==
- Nemotyla Nielsen, McQuillan & Common, 1992 (placed in Oecophorinae)
