= Acroclita sicaria =

Scientific classification
- Kingdom: Animalia
- Phylum: Arthropoda
- Clade: Pancrustacea
- Class: Insecta
- Order: Lepidoptera
- Family: Tortricidae
- Genus: Acroclita
- Species: A. sicaria

Binomial name
- Acroclita sicaria Diakonoff, 1982

Synonyms
- Heteroschistis sicaria Diakonoff, 1982

Species of moth

Acroclita sicaria is a moth of the family Tortricidae first described by Alexey Diakonoff in 1982. It is found in Sri Lanka.

== Description ==
Adult male wingspan is 8.5 mm. Head light cinereous (ash grey). Vertex infuscated (darkened with a blackish tinge). Labial palp smooth scaled with slight bluish opalescence. Anterior half of thorax cinereous fuscous, whereas posterior half is pale ochreous with an interrupted black transverse band. Abdomen fuscous. Forewings oblong and narrow. Costa slightly curved. Apex rounded. Costal half of wing light cinereous with white lower half of wing. Anterior half of costa marked with irregular dark grey transverse and outwards-convex, oblique bands. There is a transverse jet-black spot at postmedian prominence of costa. Beyond the spot, the area is blackish with five short white marks. A white-ochreous marginal band runs along termen. Cilia dark grey with ochreous dusting. Hindwings and cilia light glossy fuscous grey.
