= Anthophila =

Anthophila may refer to:

- Anthophila (bee), a clade of insects in the order Hymenoptera comprising the bees
- Anthophila (moth), a genus of moths in the family Choreutidae
