= Apatema whalleyi =

Scientific classification
- Domain: Eukaryota
- Kingdom: Animalia
- Phylum: Arthropoda
- Class: Insecta
- Order: Lepidoptera
- Family: Autostichidae
- Genus: Apatema
- Species: A. whalleyi

Binomial name
- Apatema whalleyi (Popescu-Gorj & Capuse, 1965)

Synonyms
- Microgonia whalleyi Popescu-Gorj & Capuse, 1965

Species of moth

Apatema whalleyi is a moth of the family Autostichidae. It is found in Austria, Slovakia, the Czech Republic, Hungary, Romania and on Crete.

The wingspan is about 10 mm.
