= Oegoconia ariadne =

Scientific classification
- Kingdom: Animalia
- Phylum: Arthropoda
- Clade: Pancrustacea
- Class: Insecta
- Order: Lepidoptera
- Family: Autostichidae
- Genus: Oegoconia
- Species: O. ariadne

Binomial name
- Oegoconia ariadne Gozmány, 1988

Species of moth

Oegoconia ariadne is a moth of the family Autostichidae. It is found on the Aegean (Crete) and the Dodecanese (Karpathos, Samos) islands in Greece. There is also a record from Bulgaria that requires further confirmation.
