= Oegoconia deluccai =

Scientific classification
- Domain: Eukaryota
- Kingdom: Animalia
- Phylum: Arthropoda
- Class: Insecta
- Order: Lepidoptera
- Family: Autostichidae
- Genus: Oegoconia
- Species: O. deluccai

Binomial name
- Oegoconia deluccai Amsel, 1952

Species of moth

Oegoconia deluccai is a moth of the family Autostichidae. It is found on Malta, including the adjacent island of Gozo.
