= Neurotomia =

Scientific classification
- Domain: Eukaryota
- Kingdom: Animalia
- Phylum: Arthropoda
- Class: Insecta
- Order: Lepidoptera
- Family: Pyralidae
- Genus: Neurotomia; Chrétien, 1911

Synonyms
- Ciliocerodes Amsel, 1961

Genus of moths

Neurotomia is a genus of snout moths described by Pierre Chrétien in 1911.

== Species ==
- Neurotomia belutschistanella (Amsel, 1961)
- Neurotomia coenulentella (Zeller, 1846)
