= Acroclita catharotorna =

Scientific classification
- Kingdom: Animalia
- Phylum: Arthropoda
- Class: Insecta
- Order: Lepidoptera
- Family: Tortricidae
- Genus: Acroclita
- Species: A. catharotorna

Binomial name
- Acroclita catharotorna Meyrick, 1935

Synonyms
- Rhopalovalva catharotorna

Species of moth

Acroclita catharotorna is a moth of the family Tortricidae. It is found in China (Tianjin, Shanghai, Zhejiang, Hunan), Taiwan and Japan.

The wingspan is about 12mm.
