= Apatema impunctella =

Scientific classification
- Domain: Eukaryota
- Kingdom: Animalia
- Phylum: Arthropoda
- Class: Insecta
- Order: Lepidoptera
- Family: Autostichidae
- Genus: Apatema
- Species: A. impunctella

Binomial name
- Apatema impunctella Amsel, 1940

Synonyms
- Apatema fasciata f. impunctella Amsel, 1940

Species of moth

Apatema impunctella is a moth of the family Autostichidae. It is found on Corsica and Sardinia and in France and Italy.
