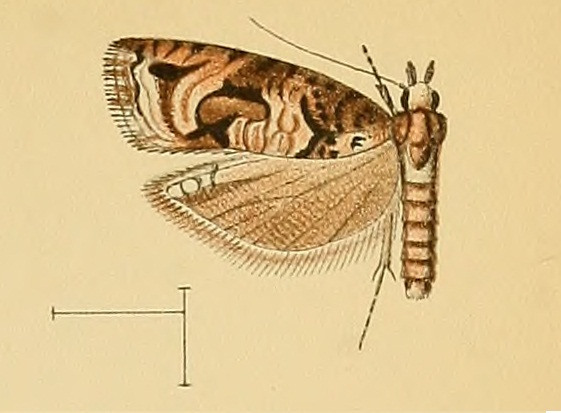

Scientific classification
- Domain: Eukaryota
- Kingdom: Animalia
- Phylum: Arthropoda
- Class: Insecta
- Order: Lepidoptera
- Family: Tortricidae
- Genus: Acroclita
- Species: A. sonchana

Binomial name
- Acroclita sonchana Walsingham, 1907

Synonyms
- Acroclita conchana Kennel, 1921

= Acroclita sonchana =

Species of moth

Acroclita sonchana is a moth of the family Tortricidae. It is found on the Canary Islands.

The wingspan is 14–17 mm. The forewings are dark fuscous, sprinkled and mottled with shades of chestnut brown. The hindwings are brownish cinereous (ashy grey).

The larvae feed on the leaves of Sonchus gummifer and Sonchus leptocephalus. Young larvae are dull grey, but turn bright red before pupation.
