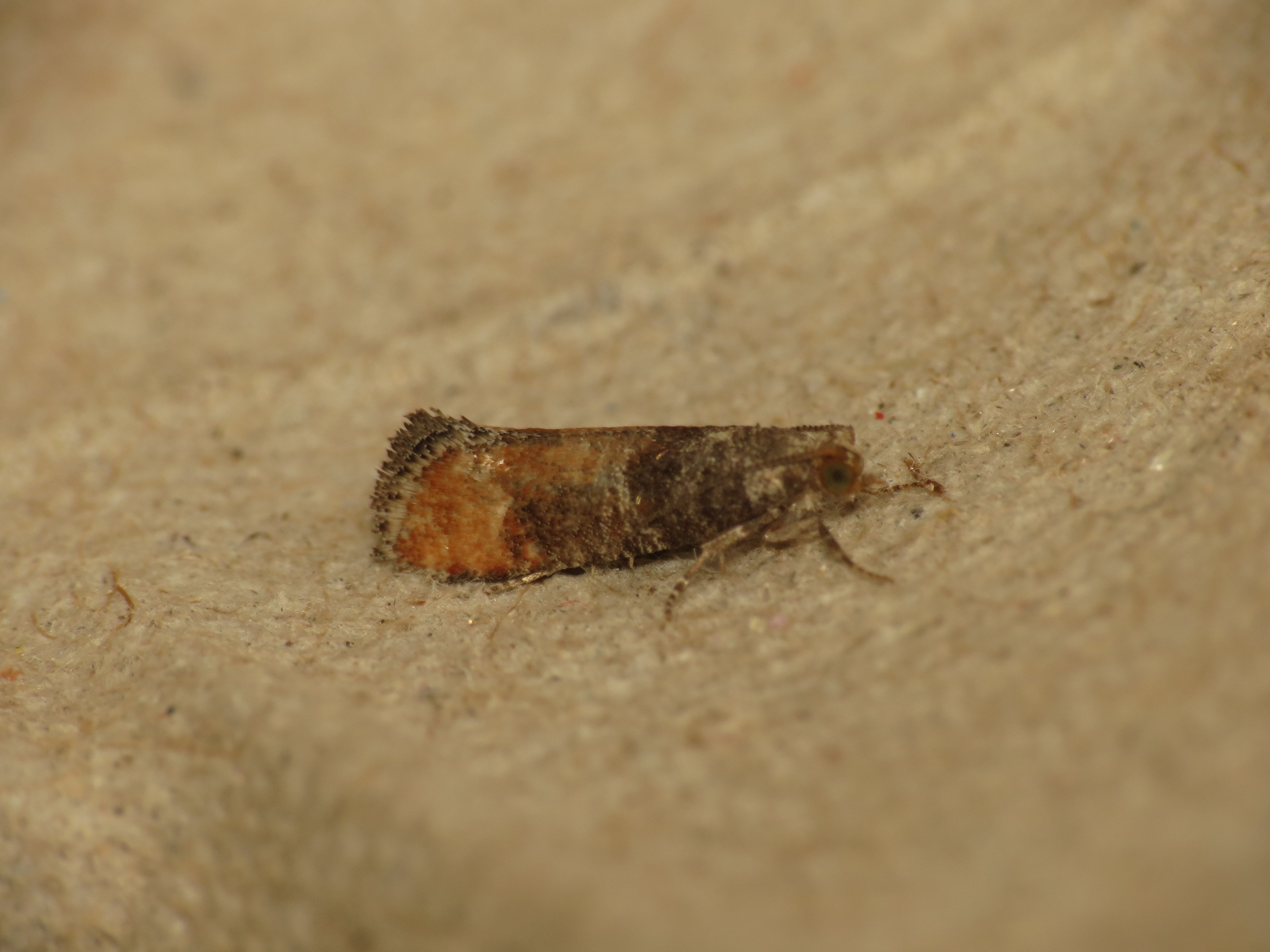

Scientific classification
- Domain: Eukaryota
- Kingdom: Animalia
- Phylum: Arthropoda
- Class: Insecta
- Order: Lepidoptera
- Family: Tortricidae
- Genus: Clavigesta
- Species: C. purdeyi

Binomial name
- Clavigesta purdeyi (Durrant, 1911)

= Clavigesta purdeyi =

Species of moth

Clavigesta purdeyi, the pine leaf-mining moth, is a moth of the family Tortricidae. It is found in Belgium, the Netherlands, the United Kingdom and Ireland.

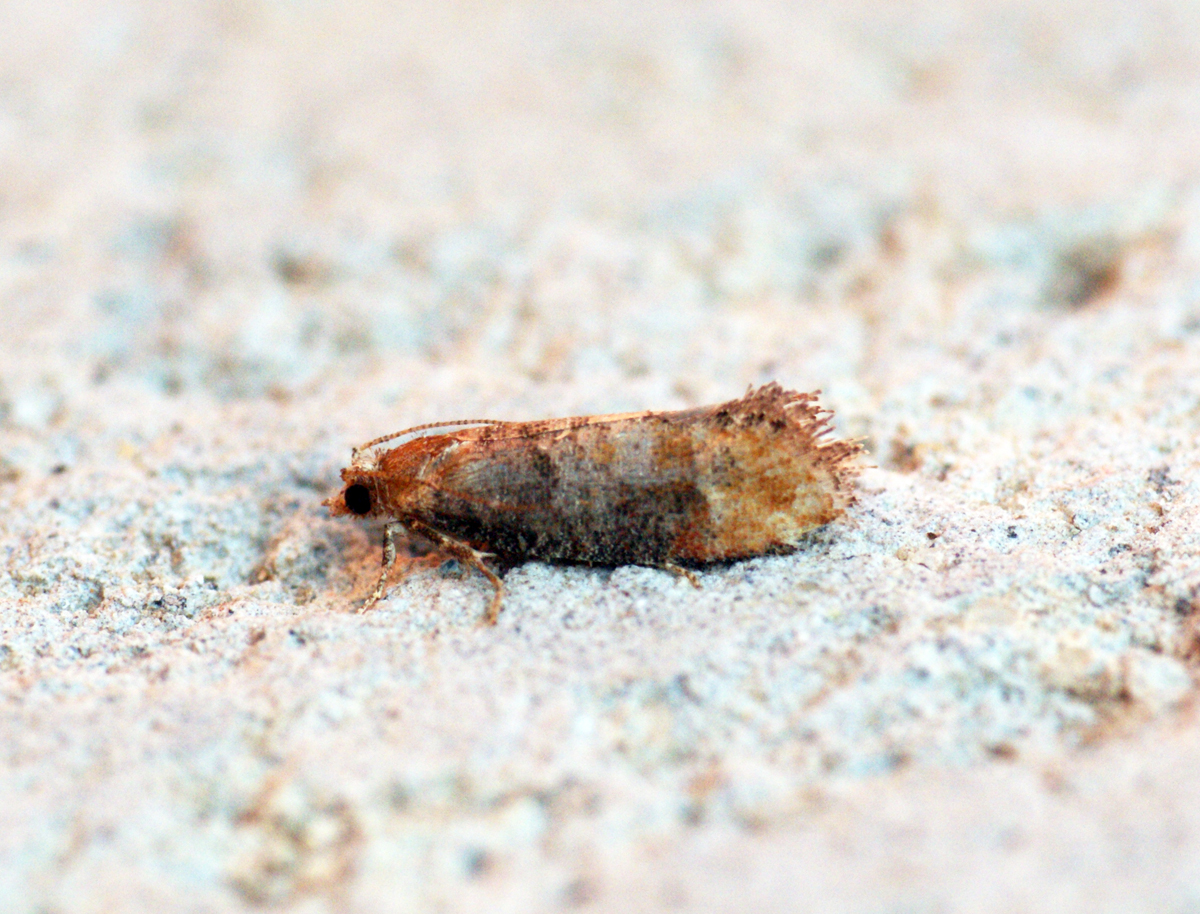

The wingspan is 10–12 mm. The forewing is reddish-brown with a reddish wingtip and narrow, grey transverse bands.

The imago is on wing from July to September.

The larvae mine the needles of Pinus sylvestris, Pinus contorta var. latifolia and Pinus nigra var. maritima and do not enter the buds or shoots.
