= Apatema junnilaineni =

Scientific classification
- Domain: Eukaryota
- Kingdom: Animalia
- Phylum: Arthropoda
- Class: Insecta
- Order: Lepidoptera
- Family: Autostichidae
- Genus: Apatema
- Species: A. junnilaineni

Binomial name
- Apatema junnilaineni Vives, 2001

Species of moth

Apatema junnilaineni is a moth of the family Autostichidae. It is found on the Canary Islands.
