= Anthophila alpinella =

Scientific classification
- Domain: Eukaryota
- Kingdom: Animalia
- Phylum: Arthropoda
- Class: Insecta
- Order: Lepidoptera
- Family: Choreutidae
- Genus: Anthophila
- Species: A. alpinella

Binomial name
- Anthophila alpinella (Busck, 1904)

Synonyms
- Hemerophila alpinella Busck, 1904

Species of moth

Anthophila alpinella is a moth of the family Choreutidae. It is found from the north-eastern United States and southern Canada to British Columbia, the Rocky Mountains, and along the Pacific Coast to Marin County, California.

The forewings are cream with heavy brown dusting.

In Canada, adults have been recorded from early June to early July and in September.

The larvae feed on Urtica species, including Urtica dioica. They form a web at the tip of a leaf of their host plant. Larvae can be found in April, July and August.
