= Acroclita posterovenata =

Scientific classification
- Domain: Eukaryota
- Kingdom: Animalia
- Phylum: Arthropoda
- Class: Insecta
- Order: Lepidoptera
- Family: Tortricidae
- Genus: Acroclita
- Species: A. posterovenata

Binomial name
- Acroclita posterovenata Razowski, 2009

Species of moth

Acroclita posterovenata is a moth of the family Tortricidae. It is found in Vietnam.

The wingspan is 18 mm (0.71 in).

== Etymology ==
The name refers to the dark, distinct venation of the posterior wings.
