= Apatema apatemella =

Scientific classification
- Domain: Eukaryota
- Kingdom: Animalia
- Phylum: Arthropoda
- Class: Insecta
- Order: Lepidoptera
- Family: Autostichidae
- Genus: Apatema
- Species: A. apatemella

Binomial name
- Apatema apatemella (Amsel, 1958)

Synonyms
- Oegoconia apatemella Amsel, 1958

Species of moth

Apatema apatemella is a moth of the family Autostichidae. It is found on Cyprus.
