= Elachista encumeadae =

Scientific classification
- Kingdom: Animalia
- Phylum: Arthropoda
- Clade: Pancrustacea
- Class: Insecta
- Order: Lepidoptera
- Family: Elachistidae
- Genus: Elachista
- Species: E. encumeadae

Binomial name
- Elachista encumeadae Kaila & Karsholt, 2002

Species of moth

Elachista encumeadae is a moth of the family Elachistidae that is endemic to Madeira.

There are at least two generations per year.

The larvae feed on Festuca donax. They mine the leaves of their host plant.
