= Anthophila ludifica =

Scientific classification
- Kingdom: Animalia
- Phylum: Arthropoda
- Class: Insecta
- Order: Lepidoptera
- Family: Choreutidae
- Genus: Anthophila
- Species: A. ludifica

Binomial name
- Anthophila ludifica (Meyrick, 1914)

Synonyms
- Simaethis ludifica Meyrick, 1914

Species of moth

Anthophila ludifica is a moth in the family Choreutidae. It was described by Edward Meyrick in 1914. It is found in Nigeria.
