= Aporodes pygmaealis =

Scientific classification
- Domain: Eukaryota
- Kingdom: Animalia
- Phylum: Arthropoda
- Class: Insecta
- Order: Lepidoptera
- Family: Crambidae
- Genus: Aporodes
- Species: A. pygmaealis

Binomial name
- Aporodes pygmaealis Amsel, 1961

Species of moth

Aporodes pygmaealis is a moth of the family Crambidae described by Hans Georg Amsel in 1961. It is found mostly in Iran.
