= Oegoconia huemeri =

Scientific classification
- Kingdom: Animalia
- Phylum: Arthropoda
- Clade: Pancrustacea
- Class: Insecta
- Order: Lepidoptera
- Family: Autostichidae
- Genus: Oegoconia
- Species: O. huemeri

Binomial name
- Oegoconia huemeri Sutter, 2007

Species of moth

Oegoconia huemeri is a moth of the family Autostichidae. It is found in Croatia, Italy, Switzerland, southern France, northeastern Spain and on Sicily at elevations below 1,400 m (4,600 ft).

The length of the forewings is 12–17 mm. Adults are on wing from the end of May to mid-October.

== Etymology ==
The species is named for Peter Huemer.
