= Anthophila abhasica =

Scientific classification
- Domain: Eukaryota
- Kingdom: Animalia
- Phylum: Arthropoda
- Class: Insecta
- Order: Lepidoptera
- Family: Choreutidae
- Genus: Anthophila
- Species: A. abhasica

Binomial name
- Anthophila abhasica Danilevsky, 1969

Species of moth

Anthophila abhasica is a moth of the family Choreutidae. It is known from Germany, the Czech Republic, Austria, Slovakia, Serbia and Montenegro, Romania, Ukraine, Georgia and Azerbaijan.
