= Anthophila filipjevi =

Scientific classification
- Domain: Eukaryota
- Kingdom: Animalia
- Phylum: Arthropoda
- Class: Insecta
- Order: Lepidoptera
- Family: Choreutidae
- Genus: Anthophila
- Species: A. filipjevi

Binomial name
- Anthophila filipjevi Danilevsky, 1969

Species of moth

Anthophila filipjevi is a moth in the family Choreutidae. It was described by Aleksandr Sergeievich Danilevsky in 1969. It is found in Russia (Central Siberia, Irkutsk, Lake Baikal, Bagan-Ogly, Uyuk region).
