= Anthophila latarniki =

Scientific classification
- Kingdom: Animalia
- Phylum: Arthropoda
- Class: Insecta
- Order: Lepidoptera
- Family: Choreutidae
- Genus: Anthophila
- Species: A. latarniki

Binomial name
- Anthophila latarniki Guillermet, 2010

Species of moth

Anthophila latarniki is a moth in the family Choreutidae. It was described by Christian Guillermet in 2010. It is found on Réunion.
