= Acroclita vigescens =

Scientific classification
- Domain: Eukaryota
- Kingdom: Animalia
- Phylum: Arthropoda
- Class: Insecta
- Order: Lepidoptera
- Family: Tortricidae
- Genus: Acroclita
- Species: A. vigescens

Binomial name
- Acroclita vigescens Meyrick, 1920

Species of moth

Acroclita vigescens is a moth of the family Tortricidae first described by Edward Meyrick in 1920. It is found in India and Sri Lanka.

Larval host plants are Cordia trifolia and Cordia myxa.
