= Anthophila brachymorpha =

Scientific classification
- Kingdom: Animalia
- Phylum: Arthropoda
- Class: Insecta
- Order: Lepidoptera
- Family: Choreutidae
- Genus: Anthophila
- Species: A. brachymorpha

Binomial name
- Anthophila brachymorpha (Meyrick, 1915)

Synonyms
- Simaethis brachymorpha Meyrick, 1915

Species of moth

Anthophila brachymorpha is a moth in the family Choreutidae. It was described by Edward Meyrick in 1915. It is found in Bolivia.
