= Oegoconia syndesma =

Scientific classification
- Kingdom: Animalia
- Phylum: Arthropoda
- Class: Insecta
- Order: Lepidoptera
- Family: Autostichidae
- Genus: Oegoconia
- Species: O. syndesma

Binomial name
- Oegoconia syndesma Meyrick, 1926

Species of moth

Oegoconia syndesma is a moth in the family Autostichidae. It was described by Edward Meyrick in 1926. It is found in South Africa.

The wingspan is about 13 mm. The forewings are whitish ochreous sprinkled with dark grey and with a dark fuscous spot on the base of the costa, and irregular elongate blotches before and beyond the middle, suffusedly confluent beneath with the stigmata. The stigmata form cloudy blackish spots, the plical somewhat before the first discal, the second discal transverse. There is a dark fuscous apical blotch, extended as a narrow fascia along the termen. The hindwings are ochreous whitisish.
