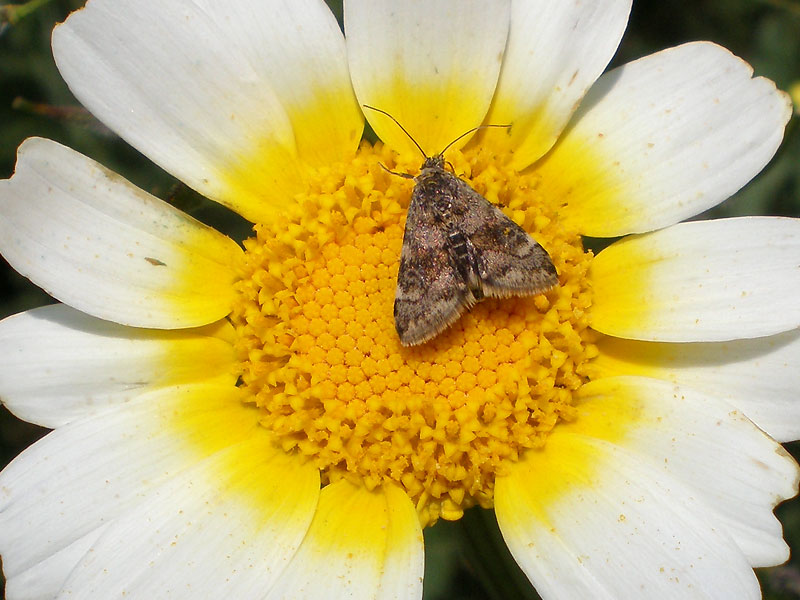
- Aporodes floralis in Higuera de Calatrava, Spain

Scientific classification
- Domain: Eukaryota
- Kingdom: Animalia
- Phylum: Arthropoda
- Class: Insecta
- Order: Lepidoptera
- Family: Crambidae
- Tribe: Odontiini
- Genus: Aporodes; Guenée, 1854

= Aporodes =

Genus of moths

Aporodes is a genus of moths of the family Crambidae described by Achille Guenée in 1854.

== Species ==
- Aporodes dentifascialis Christoph in Romanoff, 1887
- Aporodes floralis (Hübner, 1809)
- Aporodes pygmaealis Amsel, 1961
