= Aporodes dentifascialis =

Scientific classification
- Domain: Eukaryota
- Kingdom: Animalia
- Phylum: Arthropoda
- Class: Insecta
- Order: Lepidoptera
- Family: Crambidae
- Genus: Aporodes
- Species: A. dentifascialis

Binomial name
- Aporodes dentifascialis Christoph in Romanoff, 1887

Species of moth

Aporodes dentifascialis is a moth of the family Crambidae. It was described by Hugo Theodor Christoph in 1887 and is found in Azerbaijan.
