= Apatema acutivalva =

Scientific classification
- Kingdom: Animalia
- Phylum: Arthropoda
- Clade: Pancrustacea
- Class: Insecta
- Order: Lepidoptera
- Family: Autostichidae
- Genus: Apatema
- Species: A. acutivalva

Binomial name
- Apatema acutivalva Gozmány, 2000

Species of moth

Apatema acutivalva is a moth of the family Autostichidae. It is found on Cyprus.
