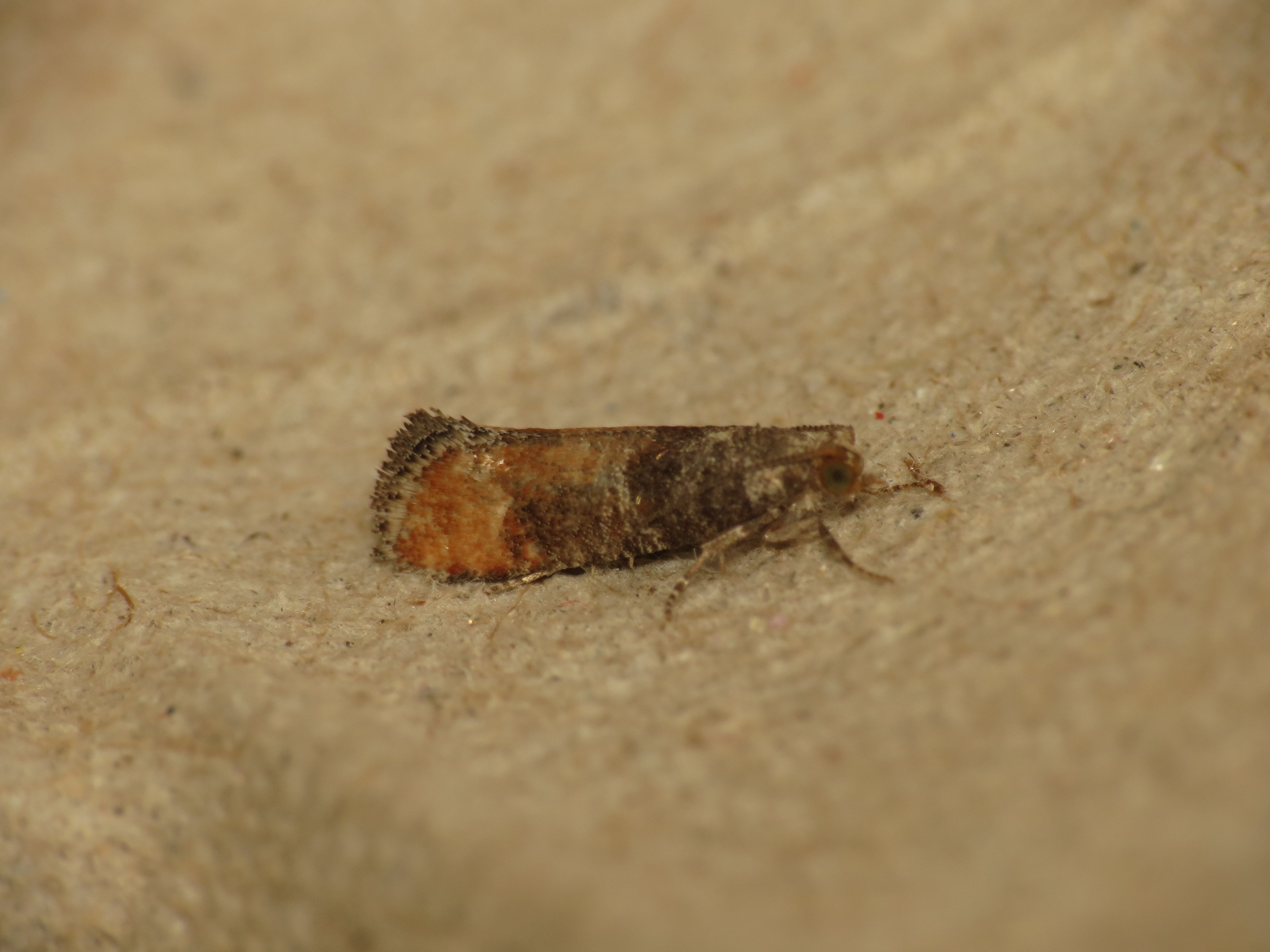
- Clavigesta purdeyi

Scientific classification
- Domain: Eukaryota
- Kingdom: Animalia
- Phylum: Arthropoda
- Class: Insecta
- Order: Lepidoptera
- Family: Tortricidae
- Tribe: Endotheniini
- Genus: Clavigesta; Obraztsov, 1946

= Clavigesta =

Genus of tortrix moths

Clavigesta is a genus of moths belonging to the subfamily Olethreutinae of the family Tortricidae.

== Species ==
- Clavigesta purdeyi (Durrant, 1911)
- Clavigesta sylvestrana (Curtis, 1850)

== See also ==
- List of Tortricidae genera
