= Apatema parodia =

Scientific classification
- Kingdom: Animalia
- Phylum: Arthropoda
- Clade: Pancrustacea
- Class: Insecta
- Order: Lepidoptera
- Family: Autostichidae
- Genus: Apatema
- Species: A. parodia

Binomial name
- Apatema parodia (Gozmány, 1988)

Synonyms
- Oegoconia parodia Gozmány, 1988

Species of moth

Apatema parodia is a moth of the family Autostichidae. It is found in Spain and Morocco.
