= Anthophila oreina =

Scientific classification
- Domain: Eukaryota
- Kingdom: Animalia
- Phylum: Arthropoda
- Class: Insecta
- Order: Lepidoptera
- Family: Choreutidae
- Genus: Anthophila
- Species: A. oreina

Binomial name
- Anthophila oreina Diakonoff, 1979

Species of moth

Anthophila oreina is a moth in the family Choreutidae. It was described by Alexey Diakonoff in 1979. It is found in Kashmir.
