= Oegoconia meledantis =

Scientific classification
- Kingdom: Animalia
- Phylum: Arthropoda
- Class: Insecta
- Order: Lepidoptera
- Family: Autostichidae
- Genus: Oegoconia
- Species: O. meledantis

Binomial name
- Oegoconia meledantis (Meyrick, 1921)

Synonyms
- Clerogenes meledantis Meyrick, 1921; Oegoconia cyrota Meyrick, 1921

Species of moth

Oegoconia meledantis is a moth in the family Autostichidae. It was described by Edward Meyrick in 1921. It is found in South Africa.

The wingspan is about 10 mm. The forewings are pale ochreous, thinly sprinkled with blackish and with a triangular dark fuscous spot on the base of the costa. The stigmata are black, the plical rather obliquely before the first discal. There is a spot of dark fuscous suffusion on the costa at three-fifths, and a rather smaller one on the dorsum before the tornus opposite to it. There are also three or four indistinct dots of blackish irroration on the termen. The hindwings are pale grey.
