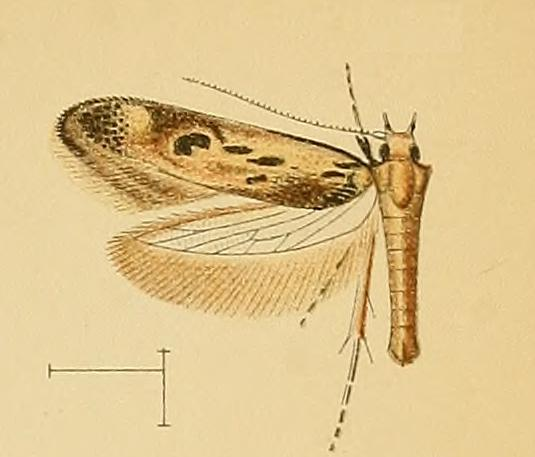

Scientific classification
- Domain: Eukaryota
- Kingdom: Animalia
- Phylum: Arthropoda
- Class: Insecta
- Order: Lepidoptera
- Family: Autostichidae
- Genus: Apatema
- Species: A. lucidum

Binomial name
- Apatema lucidum Walsingham, 1908

= Apatema lucidum =

Species of moth

Apatema lucidum is a moth of the family Autostichidae. It is found on the Canary Islands.

The wingspan is 13–14 mm. The forewings are pale ochreous, partially shaded with umber-brown. The hindwings are pale straw-whitish.
