= Oegoconia uralskella =

Scientific classification
- Domain: Eukaryota
- Kingdom: Animalia
- Phylum: Arthropoda
- Class: Insecta
- Order: Lepidoptera
- Family: Autostichidae
- Genus: Oegoconia
- Species: O. uralskella

Binomial name
- Oegoconia uralskella Popescu-Gorj & Capuse, 1965

Species of moth

Oegoconia uralskella is a moth of the family Autostichidae. It is found in France, Switzerland, Germany, Austria, Italy, Hungary, Slovakia, the Czech Republic, Bulgaria, Greece, Russia and on Corsica and Sardinia.

The wingspan is about 15 mm.

== Subspecies ==
- Oegoconia uralskella uralskella
- Oegoconia uralskella corsa Sutter & Liska, 2003 (Corsica, Sardinia)
