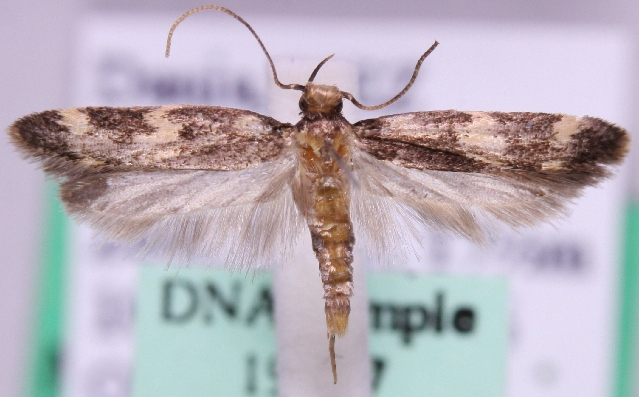
- Oegoconia novimundi

Scientific classification
- Kingdom: Animalia
- Phylum: Arthropoda
- Clade: Pancrustacea
- Class: Insecta
- Order: Lepidoptera
- Family: Autostichidae
- Subfamily: Oegoconiinae
- Genus: Oegoconia; Stainton, 1854

Synonyms
- Oecogenia; Oecogonia Reutti, 1898; Clerogenes Meyrick, 1921

= Oegoconia =

Genus of moths

Oegoconia is a moth genus in the family Autostichidae.

== Species ==
- Oegoconia annae Sutter, 2007
- Oegoconia ariadne Gozmány, 1988
- Oegoconia caradjai Popescu-Gorj & Capuse, 1965
- Oegoconia ceres Sutter, 2007
- Oegoconia deauratella (Herrich-Schäffer, 1854)
- Oegoconia deluccai Amsel, 1952
- Oegoconia huemeri Sutter, 2007
- Oegoconia meledantis (Meyrick, 1921)
- Oegoconia novimundi (Busck, 1915)
- Oegoconia praeramis Meyrick, 1918
- Oegoconia quadripuncta (Haworth, 1828)
- Oegoconia syndesma Meyrick, 1926
- Oegoconia uralskella Popescu-Gorj & Capuse, 1965
