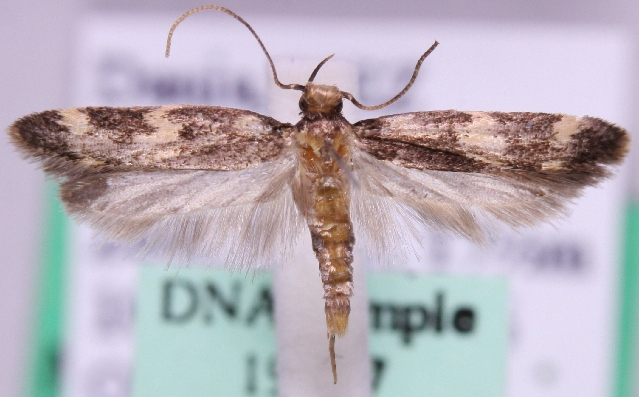

Scientific classification
- Domain: Eukaryota
- Kingdom: Animalia
- Phylum: Arthropoda
- Class: Insecta
- Order: Lepidoptera
- Family: Autostichidae
- Genus: Oegoconia
- Species: O. novimundi

Binomial name
- Oegoconia novimundi (Busck, 1915)

Synonyms
- Symmoca novimundi Busck, 1915

= Oegoconia novimundi =

Species of moth

Oegoconia novimundi is a moth of the family Autostichidae. It is found in Spain, France, Germany, Austria, Slovakia, Belgium, Croatia, former Serbia and Montenegro, Italy, Bulgaria, Hungary, North Macedonia, Greece and on Corsica and the Azores.
