= Anthophila decolorana =

Scientific classification
- Kingdom: Animalia
- Phylum: Arthropoda
- Class: Insecta
- Order: Lepidoptera
- Family: Choreutidae
- Genus: Anthophila
- Species: A. decolorana

Binomial name
- Anthophila decolorana Danilevsky, 1969/1970

Species of moth

Anthophila decolorana is a moth in the family Choreutidae. It was described by Aleksandr Sergeievich Danilevsky in 1969. It is known from Georgia.
