= Apatema mediopallidum =

Scientific classification
- Domain: Eukaryota
- Kingdom: Animalia
- Phylum: Arthropoda
- Class: Insecta
- Order: Lepidoptera
- Family: Autostichidae
- Genus: Apatema
- Species: A. mediopallidum

Binomial name
- Apatema mediopallidum Walsingham, 1900

Synonyms
- Oegoconia bifasciatum Chrétien, 1922; Apatema melitensis Amsel, 1952; Oegoconia quadripuncta f. minor Rebel, 1916; Oegoconia phanerodoxa Meyrick, 1926; Oegoconia proteroclina Meyrick, 1939

Species of moth

Apatema mediopallidum is a moth of the family Autostichidae. It is found on Corsica, Sardinia, Sicily, Malta, Crete, Cyprus and in Portugal, Spain, France, Italy, Austria, Hungary, Albania, the Czech Republic, Romania, Bulgaria, North Macedonia, Greece, Turkey and on the Canary Islands.

The wingspan is about 12 mm. The forewings are very pale ochreous, mottled and shaded with fuscous. The hindwings are shining pale grey.
