= Anthophila bidzilyai =

Scientific classification
- Domain: Eukaryota
- Kingdom: Animalia
- Phylum: Arthropoda
- Class: Insecta
- Order: Lepidoptera
- Family: Choreutidae
- Genus: Anthophila
- Species: A. bidzilyai

Binomial name
- Anthophila bidzilyai Budashkin, 1997

Species of moth

Anthophila bidzilyai is a moth in the family Choreutidae. It was described by Yury I. Budashkin in 1997. It is found in Russia.
