= Oegoconia ceres =

Scientific classification
- Kingdom: Animalia
- Phylum: Arthropoda
- Clade: Pancrustacea
- Class: Insecta
- Order: Lepidoptera
- Family: Autostichidae
- Genus: Oegoconia
- Species: O. ceres

Binomial name
- Oegoconia ceres Sutter, 2007

Species of moth

Oegoconia ceres is a moth of the family Autostichidae. It is found on Sardinia at elevations below 750 m (2,460 ft).

The length of the forewings is 10–15 mm.. Adults are on wing from the end of May to early July.

== Etymology ==
The species is named for the Roman goddess Ceres.
