= Anthophila armata =

Scientific classification
- Domain: Eukaryota
- Kingdom: Animalia
- Phylum: Arthropoda
- Class: Insecta
- Order: Lepidoptera
- Family: Choreutidae
- Genus: Anthophila
- Species: A. armata

Binomial name
- Anthophila armata Danilevsky, 1969

Synonyms
- Anthophila armata f. superba Diakonoff, 1979

Species of moth

Anthophila armata is a moth in the family Choreutidae. It was described by Aleksandr Sergeievich Danilevsky in 1969. It is found in Kazakhstan and Russia.
