= Anthophila dischides =

Scientific classification
- Domain: Eukaryota
- Kingdom: Animalia
- Phylum: Arthropoda
- Class: Insecta
- Order: Lepidoptera
- Family: Choreutidae
- Genus: Anthophila
- Species: A. dischides

Binomial name
- Anthophila dischides Diakonoff, 1978

Species of moth

Anthophila dischides is a moth in the family Choreutidae. It was described by Alexey Diakonoff in 1978. It is found in Yunnan, China.
