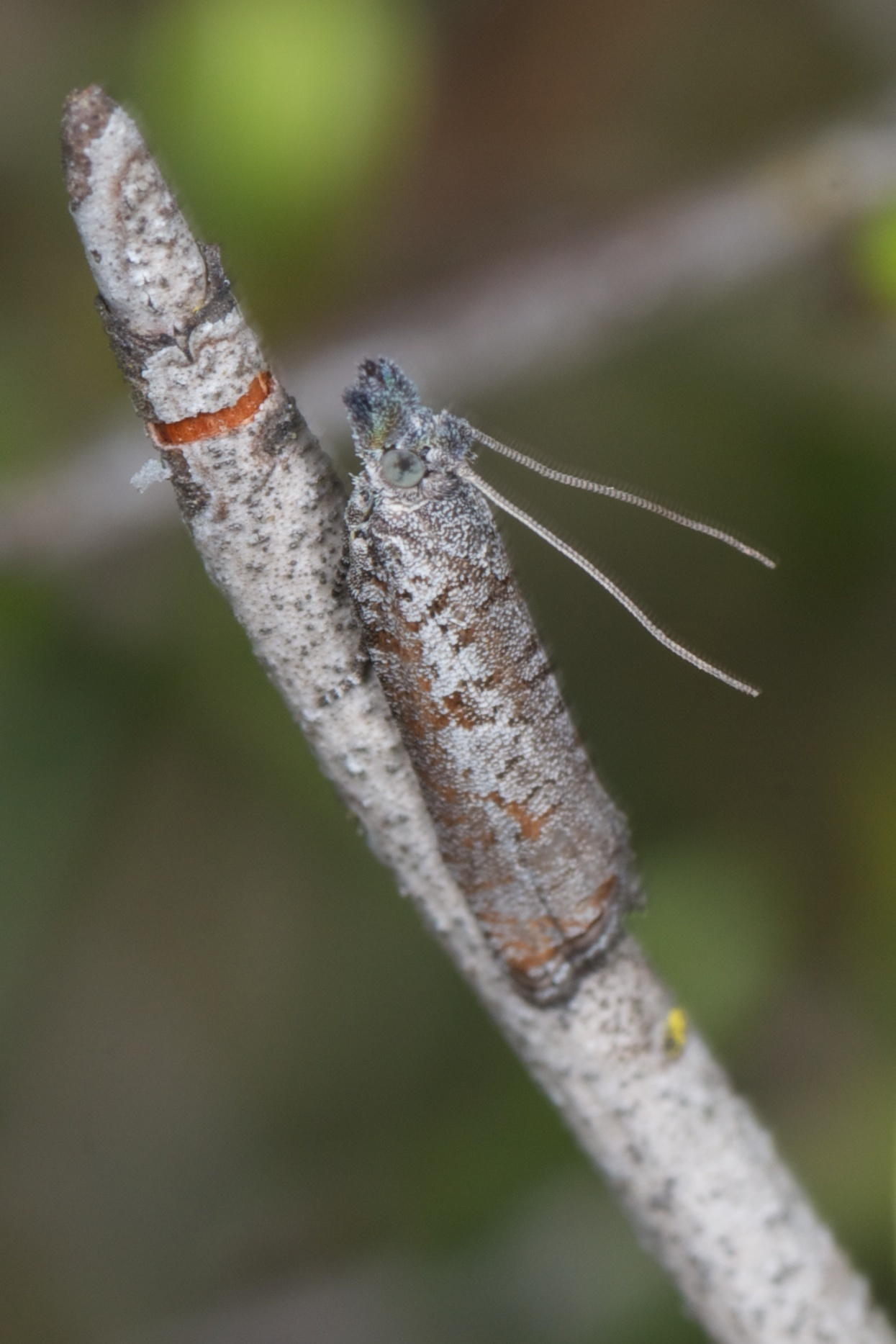

Conservation status
- Nationally Vulnerable (NZ TCS)

Scientific classification
- Kingdom: Animalia
- Phylum: Arthropoda
- Clade: Pancrustacea
- Class: Insecta
- Order: Lepidoptera
- Family: Tortricidae
- Genus: Acroclita
- Species: A. discariana

Binomial name
- Acroclita discariana Philpott, 1930

= Acroclita discariana =

Species of moth

Acroclita discariana is a species of moth in the family Tortricidae, endemic to New Zealand. It is classified as Nationally Vulnerable by the Department of Conservation.

== Taxonomy ==
This species was first described by Alfred Philpott in 1930 using a specimen collected by Stuart Lindsay at Porter River. Philpott named the species Acroclita discariana. The genus level classification of this species is regarded as unsatisfactory. As such this species is also currently known as Acroclita (s.l.) discariana. The holotype specimen is held at Canterbury Museum.

== Description ==
Philpott described the species as follows:

♂︎♀︎. 15-16mm. Head, palpi and thorax grey; head with projecting scales on frons; palpi with projecting scales above and beneath, terminal segment short, almost hidden. Antennae grey, simple in both sexes. Abdomen fuscous grey. Legs grey, tarsi obscurely annulated with white. Forewings moderate, costa slightly arched, without fold, apex blunt-pointed, termen slightly sinuate, oblique; grey mixed with brownish beneath costa and round termen, numerous transverse blackish strigulae; a triangular blackish spot in disk at 1/3 and a V-shaped blackish mark at 2/3, both of these marks being much more prominent in the ♀︎; fringes fuscous grey, with a thin faint white median line. Hindwings fuscous, fringes greyish fuscous with a darker basal line.

== Distribution ==
This species is endemic to New Zealand. The species range of this moth is Marlborough, North Canterbury and Mid Canterbury. The occurrence of A. discariana is patchy within this range. Other than its type locality, this species has been collected at Motunau/Gore Bay Beach, Cass, Jacks Pass in Hamner, Amberley Beach, Famish Stream in the Upper Wairau Valley, and the Culverden Scientific Reserve,

== Biology and life cycle ==
The larvae of A. discariana make distinctive webbing on their host plant. It is very tough, white and is formed at the stem axils of their host. The webbing can be as large as 30 cm in diameter. The species inhabits this webbing both as larvae and pupae and pupates on its larval host. The adult moth is day flying. The species is on the wing in October and November. It overwinters.

== Host species ==
The host species for this moth is the endemic plant Discaria toumatou.

== Conservation status ==
This moth has been classified under the New Zealand Threat Classification system as being Nationally Vulnerable. In 2025 this moth was confirmed to be nationally vulnerable as a result of population decline and a restricted range.
