= Apatema apolausticum =

Scientific classification
- Kingdom: Animalia
- Phylum: Arthropoda
- Clade: Pancrustacea
- Class: Insecta
- Order: Lepidoptera
- Family: Autostichidae
- Genus: Apatema
- Species: A. apolausticum

Binomial name
- Apatema apolausticum Gozmány, 1996

Species of moth

Apatema apolausticum is a moth of the family Autostichidae. It lives in Italy, Slovakia, Croatia, Albania, Hungary, Romania, Bulgaria and Greece. The wingspan is about 10 mm.
