= Anthophila colchica =

Scientific classification
- Domain: Eukaryota
- Kingdom: Animalia
- Phylum: Arthropoda
- Class: Insecta
- Order: Lepidoptera
- Family: Choreutidae
- Genus: Anthophila
- Species: A. colchica

Binomial name
- Anthophila colchica Danilevsky, 1969

Species of moth

Anthophila colchica is a moth in the family Choreutidae. It was described by Aleksandr Sergeievich Danilevsky in 1969. It is found in Georgia and Russia.
