= Oegoconia annae =

Scientific classification
- Kingdom: Animalia
- Phylum: Arthropoda
- Clade: Pancrustacea
- Class: Insecta
- Order: Lepidoptera
- Family: Autostichidae
- Genus: Oegoconia
- Species: O. annae

Binomial name
- Oegoconia annae Sutter, 2007

Species of moth

Oegoconia annae is a moth of the family Autostichidae. It is found on Sardinia at elevations below 920 m (3,020 ft).

The length of the forewings is 11–14 mm. The forewings are blackish brown with white markings. The hindwings are bright grey-brown. Adults are on wing from the end of June to early September.

== Etymology ==
The species is named for the wife of the author.
