= Apateona =

Scientific classification
- Kingdom: Animalia
- Phylum: Arthropoda
- Clade: Pancrustacea
- Class: Insecta
- Order: Lepidoptera
- Family: Autostichidae
- Subfamily: Oegoconiinae
- Genus: Apateona; Gozmány, 2008
- Species: A. hispanicum

Binomial name
- Apateona hispanicum (Gozmány, 1985)

Synonyms
- Apatema hispanicum Gozmány, 1985

Species of moth

Apateona hispanicum is a moth of the family Autostichidae and the only species in the genus Apateona. It is found in Spain.
