= Apatema sutteri =

Scientific classification
- Kingdom: Animalia
- Phylum: Arthropoda
- Clade: Pancrustacea
- Class: Insecta
- Order: Lepidoptera
- Family: Autostichidae
- Genus: Apatema
- Species: A. sutteri

Binomial name
- Apatema sutteri Gozmány, 1997

Species of moth

Apatema sutteri is a moth of the family Autostichidae. It is found in North Macedonia, Greece and on Crete.
