= Oegoconia praeramis =

Scientific classification
- Domain: Eukaryota
- Kingdom: Animalia
- Phylum: Arthropoda
- Class: Insecta
- Order: Lepidoptera
- Family: Autostichidae
- Genus: Oegoconia
- Species: O. praeramis

Binomial name
- Oegoconia praeramis Meyrick, 1918

Species of moth

Oegoconia praeramis is a moth in the family Autostichidae. It was described by Edward Meyrick in 1918. It is found in Sri Lanka.

The wingspan is about 13 mm. The forewings are ochreous whitish suffusedly sprinkled with pale yellow ochreous. The markings are blackish, with the costal and dorsal marks at the base. There is a small costal spot near the base, and some scales beneath it. A moderately broad inwardly oblique fascia is found beyond the middle, with a fasciate lobe extending from the lower half to the disc at two-fifths (representing the anterior stigmata). There are also three or four marginal dots towards the apex. The hindwings are grey.
