= Acroclita cheradota =

Scientific classification
- Domain: Eukaryota
- Kingdom: Animalia
- Phylum: Arthropoda
- Class: Insecta
- Order: Lepidoptera
- Family: Tortricidae
- Genus: Acroclita
- Species: A. cheradota

Binomial name
- Acroclita cheradota Meyrick, 1912

Species of moth

Acroclita cheradota is a moth of the family Tortricidae first described by Edward Meyrick in 1912. It is found in Sri Lanka.
