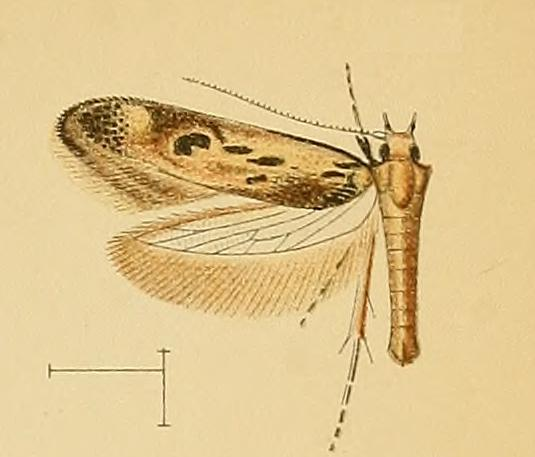
- Apatema lucidum

Scientific classification
- Kingdom: Animalia
- Phylum: Arthropoda
- Class: Insecta
- Order: Lepidoptera
- Family: Autostichidae
- Subfamily: Oegoconiinae
- Genus: Apatema; Walsingham, 1900

Synonyms
- Thanotovena Gozmány, 1957; Microgonia Popescu-Gorj & Capuse, 1965 (preocc. Herrich-Schäffer, 1855)

= Apatema =

Genus of moths

Apatema is a moth genus in the family Autostichidae.

== Species ==
- Apatema acutivalva Gozmány, 2000
- Apatema apatemella Amsel, 1958
- Apatema apolausticum Gozmány, 1996
- Apatema baixerasi Vives, 2001
- Apatema brunneum Falck & Karsholt, 2021
- Apatema coarctella (Rebel, 1896)
- Apatema confluellum Falck & Karsholt, 2021
- Apatema fasciata (Stainton, 1859)
- Apatema griseum Falck & Karsholt, 2021
- Apatema grancanariae Falck & Karsholt, 2021
- Apatema helleri (Rebel, 1910)
- Apatema impunctella Amsel, 1940
- Apatema inexpectatum Gozmány, 1988
- Apatema junnilaineni Vives, 2001
- Apatema lanzarotae Falck & Karsholt, 2021
- Apatema lapalmae Falck & Karsholt, 2021
- Apatema lucidum Walsingham, 1908
- Apatema mediopallidum Walsingham, 1900
- Apatema minimum Falck & Karsholt, 2021
- Apatema mixtum Falck & Karsholt, 2021
- Apatema parodia (Gozmány, 1988)
- Apatema pseudolucidum Falck & Karsholt, 2021
- Apatema sallyae Falck & Karsholt, 2021
- Apatema skulei Falck & Karsholt, 2021
- Apatema stadeli Falck & Karsholt, 2021
- Apatema sutteri Gozmány, 1997
- Apatema transversum Falck & Karsholt, 2021
- Apatema whalleyi (Popescu-Gorj & Capuse, 1965)
