= Anthophila massaicae =

Scientific classification
- Kingdom: Animalia
- Phylum: Arthropoda
- Class: Insecta
- Order: Lepidoptera
- Family: Choreutidae
- Genus: Anthophila
- Species: A. massaicae

Binomial name
- Anthophila massaicae Agassiz, 2008

Species of moth

Anthophila massaicae is a species of moth of the family Choreutidae. It is found in Kenya.

The larvae have been recorded feeding on Urtica massaica.
