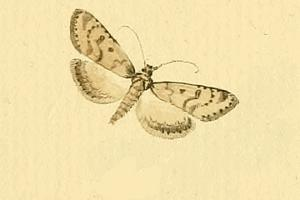

Scientific classification
- Kingdom: Animalia
- Phylum: Arthropoda
- Clade: Pancrustacea
- Class: Insecta
- Order: Lepidoptera
- Family: Crambidae
- Genus: Udea
- Species: U. numeralis

Binomial name
- Udea numeralis (Hubner, 1796)

Synonyms
- Pyralis numeralis Hubner, 1796; Pyrausta catilualis Hampson, 1900; Scopula illutalis Guenée, 1854

= Udea numeralis =

Species of moth

Udea numeralis is a species of moth in the family Crambidae described by Jacob Hübner in 1796. It is found in Southern Europe and North Africa.

The wingspan is about 26 mm.
