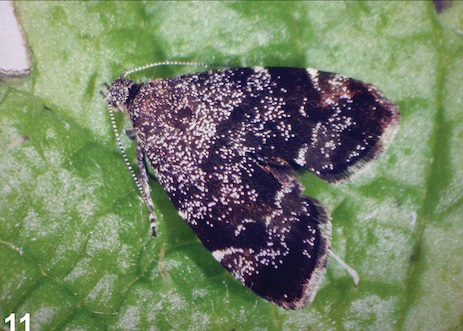
- Living adult
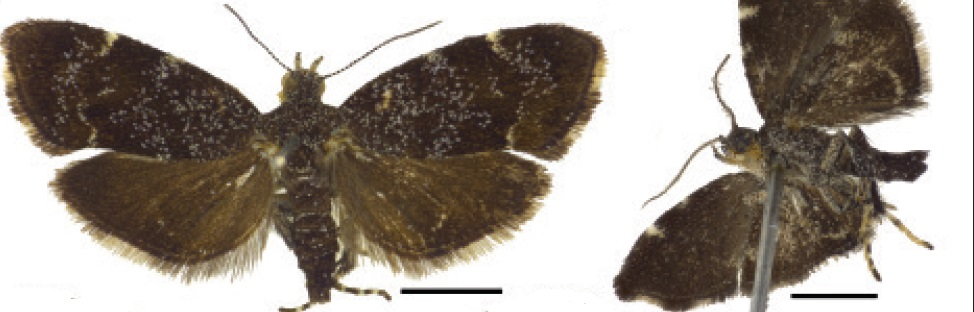
- Mounted

Scientific classification
- Domain: Eukaryota
- Kingdom: Animalia
- Phylum: Arthropoda
- Class: Insecta
- Order: Lepidoptera
- Family: Choreutidae
- Genus: Anthophila
- Species: A. threnodes

Binomial name
- Anthophila threnodes (Walsingham, 1910)

Synonyms
- Hemerophila threnodes Walsingham, 1910; Simaethis threnodes

= Anthophila threnodes =

Species of moth

Anthophila threnodes is a moth of the family Choreutidae. It is known from Madeira. The habitat consists of open landscapes at low altitudes.

The forewings have a cream-white spot at two-thirds of the costa and another such spot at four-fifths of the dorsum. The hindwings are uniform dark brown. Adults are on wing in February, March, May and July in at least two generations per year. The adults fly during the day.

The larvae feed on Urtica membranacea and possibly other Urtica species, spinning a thin web on or around the young leaves on which it feeds. The larvae are off-white with dark brown spots. They have been found in March, May and November. Pupation takes place in a reddish-brown pupa.

== Gallery ==
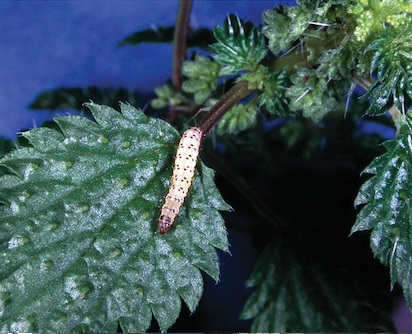
Larva

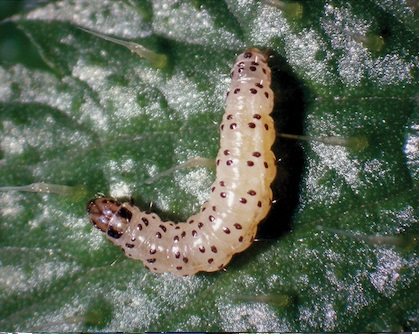
Larva, closeup

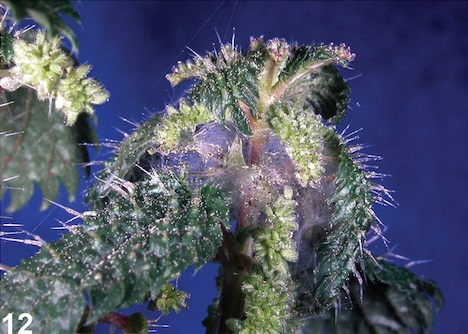
Larval webbing

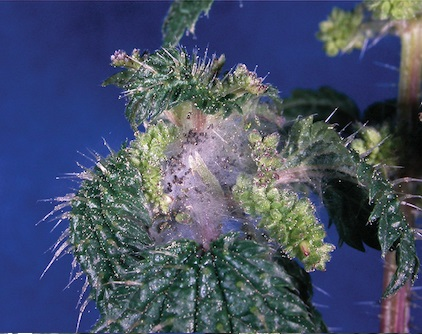
Larval webbing

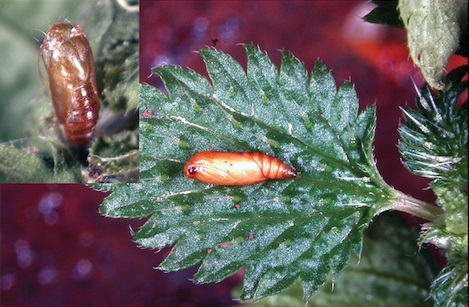
Pupa and an empty pupal shell
