= Caloptilia laurifoliae =

Scientific classification
- Domain: Eukaryota
- Kingdom: Animalia
- Phylum: Arthropoda
- Class: Insecta
- Order: Lepidoptera
- Family: Gracillariidae
- Genus: Caloptilia
- Species: C. laurifoliae

Binomial name
- Caloptilia laurifoliae (M. Hering, 1927)

Synonyms
- Gracilaria laurifoliae M. Hering, 1927

Species of moth

Caloptilia laurifoliae is a moth of the family Gracillariidae. It is known from the Canary Islands and Madeira.

The larvae feed on Laurus azorica. They mine the leaves of their host plant.
