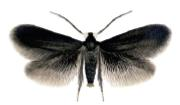

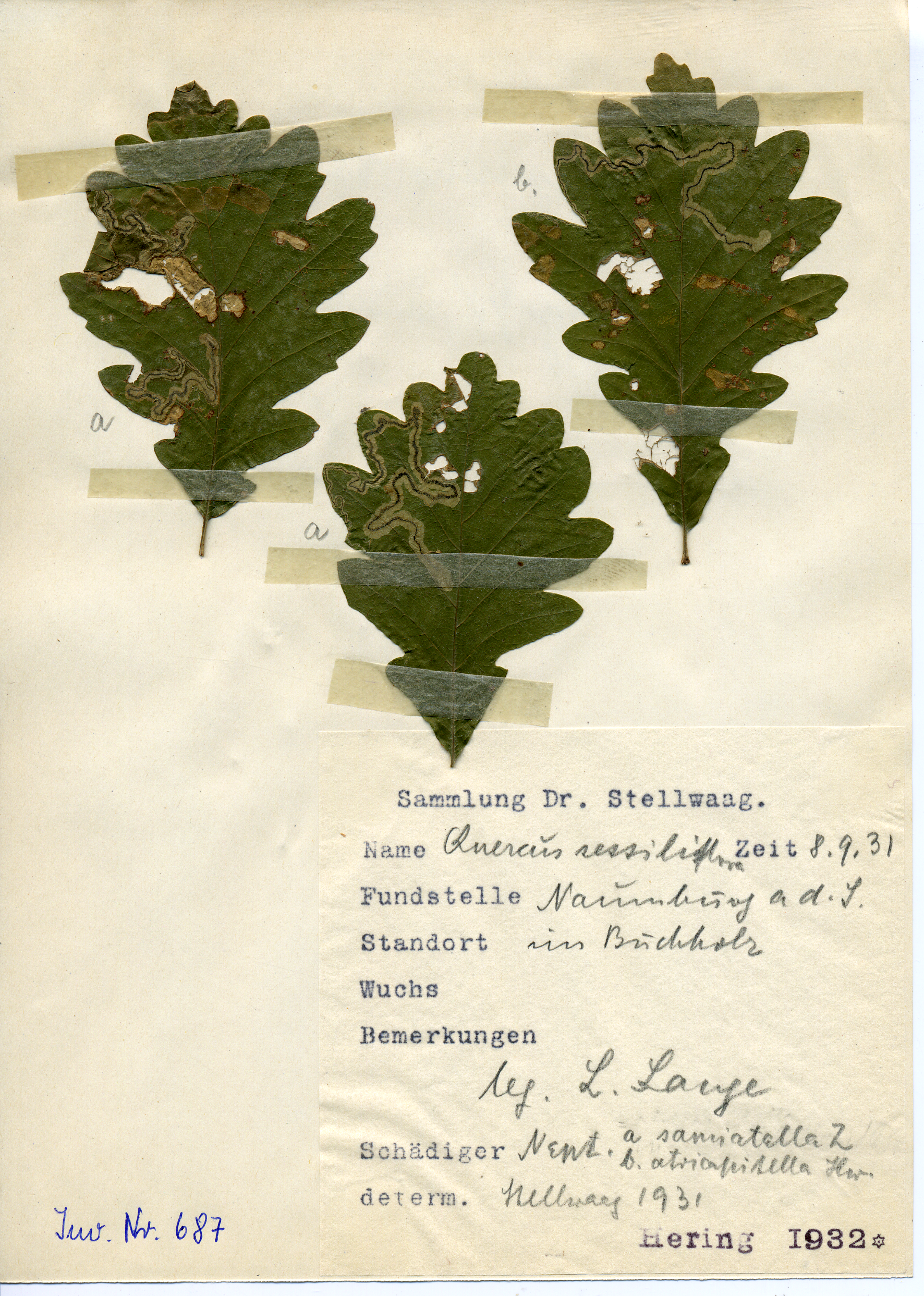

Scientific classification
- Kingdom: Animalia
- Phylum: Arthropoda
- Clade: Pancrustacea
- Class: Insecta
- Order: Lepidoptera
- Family: Nepticulidae
- Genus: Stigmella
- Species: S. atricapitella

Binomial name
- Stigmella atricapitella (Haworth, 1828)

Synonyms
- Tinea atricapitella Haworth, 1828; Nepticula discrepans Sorhagen, 1922

= Stigmella atricapitella =

Species of moth

Stigmella atricapitella is a moth belonging to the family Nepticulidae. It is found across Europe, from Scandinavia to Ireland, the Iberian Peninsula, Sicily, Greece and Ukraine, and is also present in the Near East. Additionally, it occurs on Madeira, where it is likely an introduced species.

The moth has a wingspan of 4.5–5.7 mm (0.18–0.22 in). The head is black, ferruginous to orange, or sometimes mixed, with a collar that is often whitish. The antennal eye caps are white. The forewings are shiny bronze, with a purple-suffused apex, while the Hindwings are grey.

Adults are on wing from May to June and again from July to August, producing two generations per year.

The larvae feed on several species of oak, including Quercus cerris, Quercus petraea, Quercus pubescens, Quercus pyrenaica and Quercus robur. They create Leaf mines on their host plant.
