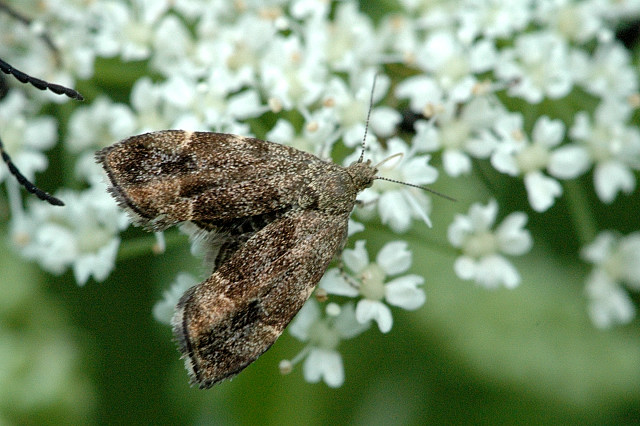
- Anthophila fabriciana, upperside
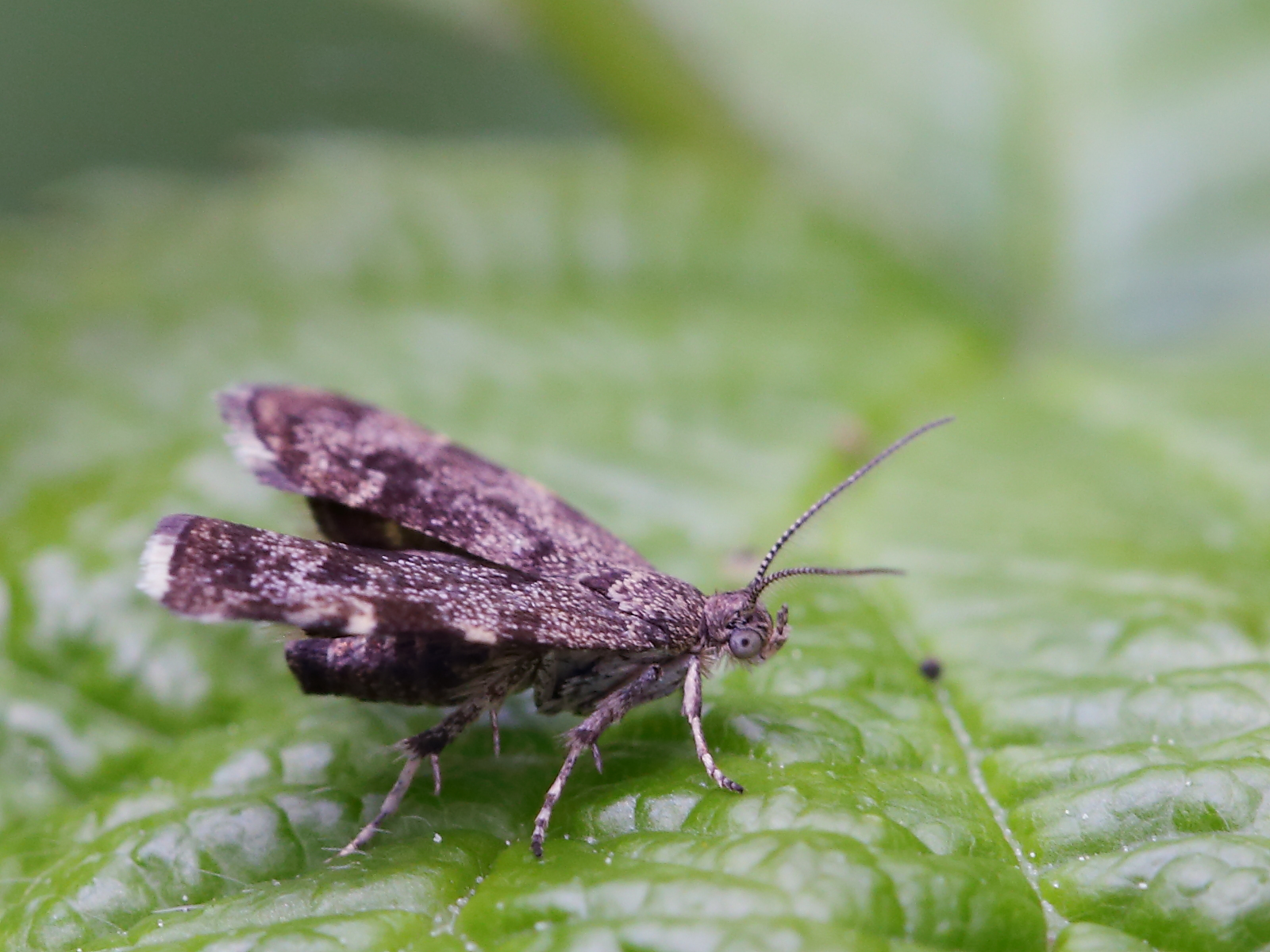
- Lateral view

Scientific classification
- Kingdom: Animalia
- Phylum: Arthropoda
- Class: Insecta
- Order: Lepidoptera
- Family: Choreutidae
- Genus: Anthophila
- Species: A. fabriciana

Binomial name
- Anthophila fabriciana (Linnaeus, 1767)

Synonyms
- List: Phalaena Tortrix fabriciana Linnaeus, 1767; Phalaena Tinea oxyacanthella Linnaeus, 1767; Tortrix urticana [Denis & Schiffermüller], 1775; Phalaena Pallium excisum Retzius, 1783; Phalaena Tortrix gilibertiana Villers, 1789; Crambus oxyacanthae Fabricius, 1798; Tortrix dentana Hübner, [1799]; Anthophila fabricii Haworth, 1811; Asopia alternalis Treitschke, 1829; Simaethis parietariae Stainton, 1855

= Anthophila fabriciana =

Species of moth

Anthophila fabriciana, also known as the common nettle-tap, is a moth of the family Choreutidae first described in 1767 by Carl Linnaeus. The moth can be found flying around stinging nettles during the day.

== Distribution ==
This species can be found in most of Europe and it occurs throughout Britain. It is also widespread from China (Taiwan, Xinjiang), the Himalaya, Mongolia, Russia, Korea, Japan (Hokkaido, Honshu, Shikoku), Afghanistan, Kazakhstan, the Canary Islands, Madeira, Asia Minor, Zakavkazye and the Oriental region. In 2013 it was reported to be present in Canada (Manitoba).

== Life cycle ==
The moth flies in two generation per year from May to October depending on the location and are active during the day. Some adults may overwinter. They can occur wherever stinging nettles occur. Anthophila fabriciana has a wingspan of 10–15 millimetres (0.39–0.59 in). The forewings are a patchwork of dark brownish fuscous marbled with pale grey, with yellowish white costal spot and post-median fascia. The abdomen shows large pale bands.

This species is rather similar to Choreutis pariana, which has whitish markings only along costa.

=== Ova ===
Eggs are laid on the stem, or on either surface of a leaf of the foodplant. The main food plant is stinging nettle (Urtica dioica), and can also be laid on eastern pellitory-of-the-wall (Parietaria officinalis) and tuberous comfrey (Symphytum tuberosum).

=== Larva ===
Larvae are up to 12 mm long, pale creamy-green or greenish-white with dark spots on each segment. They live in an individual, conspicuous web on the leaf of the host plant, usually on the upper surface, with the edges of the leaf drawn together.

=== Pupa ===
The pupa is spun in or near the larval web, and is covered in a white, dense, spindle-shaped cocoon, which is circa 8–9 mm long.

== Gallery ==
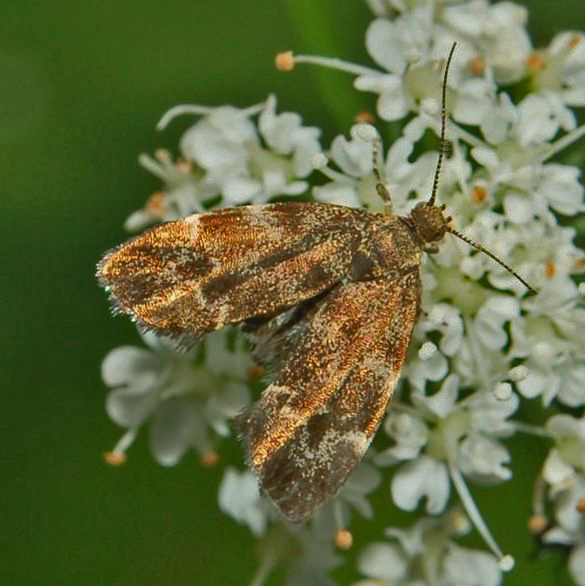
Moth

A. fabriciana on Tanacetum vulgare

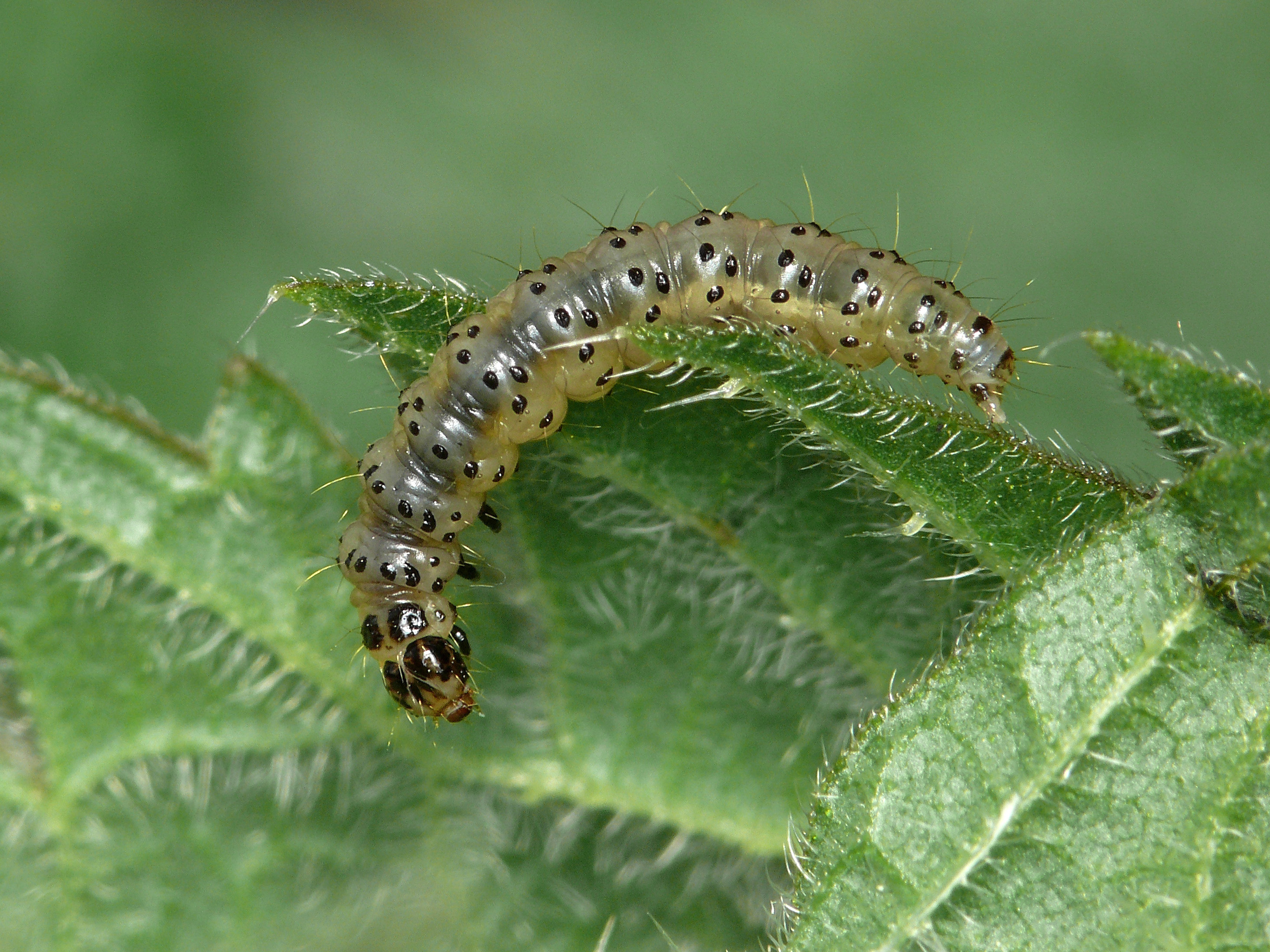
Larva
