= Eudonia stenota =

Scientific classification
- Kingdom: Animalia
- Phylum: Arthropoda
- Class: Insecta
- Order: Lepidoptera
- Family: Crambidae
- Genus: Eudonia
- Species: E. stenota

Binomial name
- Eudonia stenota (Wollaston, 1858)

Synonyms
- Eudorea stenota Wollaston, 1858

Species of moth

Eudonia stenota is a species of moth in the family Crambidae. It is found on Madeira.
