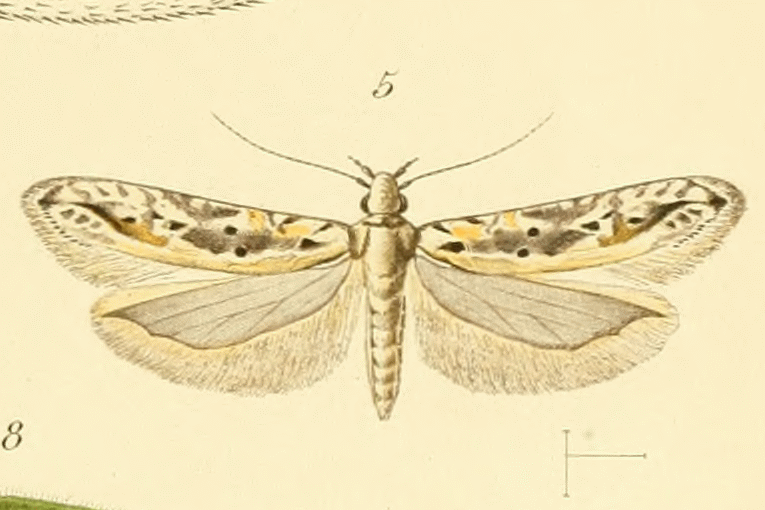

Scientific classification
- Domain: Eukaryota
- Kingdom: Animalia
- Phylum: Arthropoda
- Class: Insecta
- Order: Lepidoptera
- Family: Gelechiidae
- Genus: Scrobipalpa
- Species: S. suaedicola

Binomial name
- Scrobipalpa suaedicola (Mabille, 1906)

Synonyms
- Lita suaedicola Mabille, 1906; Lita suaedicola Amsel, 1939; Scrobipalpa (Euscrobipalpa) mabillei Povolný, 1971

= Scrobipalpa suaedicola =

Species of moth

Scrobipalpa suaedicola is a moth in the family Gelechiidae. It was described by Paul Mabille in 1906. It is found in Spain, southern France, Croatia and on Sardinia and Madeira.

The larvae feed on Suaeda vera.
