= Eupithecia rosai =

Scientific classification
- Kingdom: Animalia
- Phylum: Arthropoda
- Class: Insecta
- Order: Lepidoptera
- Family: Geometridae
- Genus: Eupithecia
- Species: E. rosai

Binomial name
- Eupithecia rosai Pinker, 1962

Species of moth

Eupithecia rosai is a moth in the family Geometridae. It is found on the Canary Islands.

The wingspan is 15–18 mm (0.59–0.71 in).
