= Eudonia scoriella =

Scientific classification
- Kingdom: Animalia
- Phylum: Arthropoda
- Class: Insecta
- Order: Lepidoptera
- Family: Crambidae
- Genus: Eudonia
- Species: E. scoriella

Binomial name
- Eudonia scoriella (Wollaston, 1858)

Synonyms
- Eudorea scoriella Wollaston, 1858; Scoparia wollastoni Bethune-Baker, 1894

Species of moth

Eudonia scoriella is a species of moth in the family Crambidae. It is found on Madeira.
