= Eupithecia latipennata =

Scientific classification
- Kingdom: Animalia
- Phylum: Arthropoda
- Clade: Pancrustacea
- Class: Insecta
- Order: Lepidoptera
- Family: Geometridae
- Genus: Eupithecia
- Species: E. latipennata

Binomial name
- Eupithecia latipennata Prout, 1914

Synonyms
- Tephroclystia latipennis Warren, 1905 (preocc. Hulst)

Species of moth

Eupithecia latipennata is a moth in the family Geometridae. It is found on Madeira.
