= Glyphipterix diaphora =

Scientific classification
- Kingdom: Animalia
- Phylum: Arthropoda
- Clade: Pancrustacea
- Class: Insecta
- Order: Lepidoptera
- Family: Glyphipterigidae
- Genus: Glyphipterix
- Species: G. diaphora

Binomial name
- Glyphipterix diaphora Walsingham, 1894

Synonyms
- Glyphipteryx longistriatella Rebel, 1940

Species of moth

Glyphipterix diaphora is a moth of the family Glyphipterigidae. It is found on the Azores and Madeira.

The wingspan is 9–10 mm. The forewings are dark bronzy fuscous, almost black along the margins of a number of white streaks. The hindwings are brownish grey.
