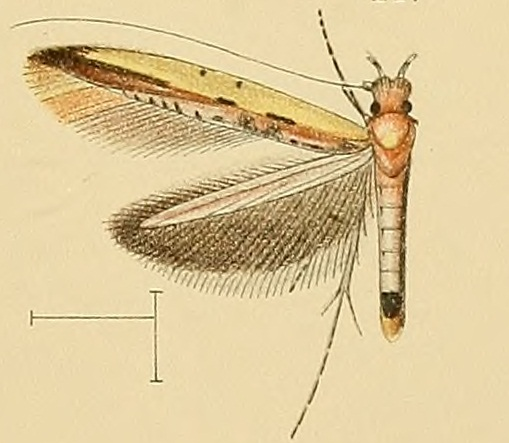

Scientific classification
- Domain: Eukaryota
- Kingdom: Animalia
- Phylum: Arthropoda
- Class: Insecta
- Order: Lepidoptera
- Family: Gracillariidae
- Genus: Caloptilia
- Species: C. staintoni

Binomial name
- Caloptilia staintoni (Wollaston, 1858)

Synonyms
- Gracilaria staintoni Wollaston, 1858

= Caloptilia staintoni =

Species of moth

Caloptilia staintoni is a moth of the family Gracillariidae. It is known from the Canary Islands and Madeira.

The larvae feed on Apollonias barbujana, Laurus azorica, Persea americana and Persea indica. They mine the leaves of their host plant.
