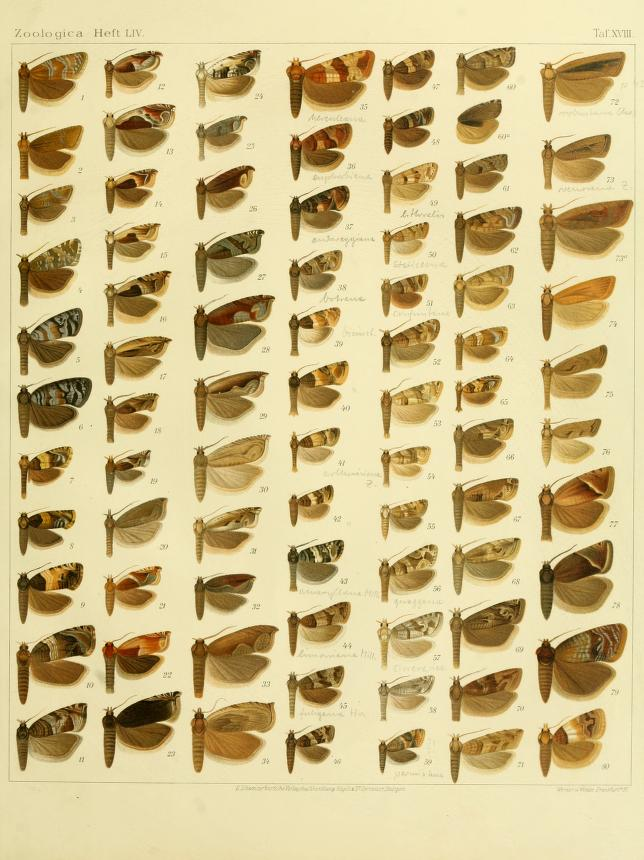
- Acroclita consequana in Kennel Die palaearktischen tortriciden figure 62 female, figure 63 ab littorana Const female

Scientific classification
- Kingdom: Animalia
- Phylum: Arthropoda
- Clade: Pancrustacea
- Class: Insecta
- Order: Lepidoptera
- Family: Tortricidae
- Tribe: Eucosmini
- Genus: Acroclita; Lederer, 1859

= Acroclita =

Genus of tortrix moths

Acroclita is a genus of moths belonging to the subfamily Olethreutinae of the family Tortricidae. The genus was described by Julius Lederer in 1859.

== Species ==
- Acroclita altivaga Meyrick, 1926
- Acroclita anelpista Diakonoff & Wolff, 1976
- Acroclita belinda Meyrick, 1912
- Acroclita bryomorpha Meyrick, 1931
- Acroclita bryopa Meyrick, 1911
- Acroclita catharotorna Meyrick, in Caradja & Meyrick, 1935
- Acroclita causterias Meyrick, 1927
- Acroclita cheradota Meyrick, 1912
- Acroclita clarissa Meyrick, 1921
- Acroclita convergens Meyrick, in de Joannis, 1930
- Acroclita cryptiolitha T. B. Fletcher, 1940
- Acroclita discariana Philpott, 1930
- Acroclita elaeagnivora Oku, 1979
- Acroclita esmeralda Meyrick, 1912
- Acroclita euphylla Meyrick, 1926
- Acroclita furculana Kuznetzov, in Kuznetzov, Kaila & Mikkola, 1996
- Acroclita guanchana Walsingham, 1907
- Acroclita gumicola Oku, 1979
- Acroclita hercoptila Meyrick, 1927
- Acroclita klimeschi Diakonoff, 1985
- Acroclita lithoxoa Diakonoff, 1950
- Acroclita loxoplecta Meyrick, in Caradja & Meyrick, 1935
- Acroclita macrotoma Turner, 1918
- Acroclita madens Meyrick, 1921
- Acroclita notophthalma Meyrick, 1933
- Acroclita paulina Meyrick, 1925
- Acroclita pertracta Diakonoff, 1989
- Acroclita posterovenata Razowski, 2009
- Acroclita prasinissa Meyrick, 1921
- Acroclita scatebrosa Meyrick, 1912
- Acroclita sonchana Walsingham, 1907
- Acroclita stenoglypha Diakonoff, 1971
- Acroclita subsequana (Herrich-Schäffer, 1851)
- Acroclita trachynota Meyrick, 1926
- Acroclita trichocnemis Meyrick, 1914
- Acroclita trimaelena Meyrick, 1922
- Acroclita vigescens Meyrick, 1920

== See also ==
- List of Tortricidae genera
