= Apatema fasciata =

Scientific classification
- Kingdom: Animalia
- Phylum: Arthropoda
- Clade: Pancrustacea
- Class: Insecta
- Order: Lepidoptera
- Family: Autostichidae
- Genus: Apatema
- Species: A. fasciata

Binomial name
- Apatema fasciata (Stainton, 1859)

Synonyms
- Gelechia fasciata Stainton, 1859; Apatema fasciatum

Species of moth

Apatema fasciata is a moth of the family Autostichidae. It is found on the Canary Islands and Madeira.

The wings have a dark ground colour.
