= Eudonia decorella =

Scientific classification
- Kingdom: Animalia
- Phylum: Arthropoda
- Clade: Pancrustacea
- Class: Insecta
- Order: Lepidoptera
- Family: Crambidae
- Genus: Eudonia
- Species: E. decorella

Binomial name
- Eudonia decorella (Stainton, 1859)

Synonyms
- Eudorea decorella Stainton, 1859; Scoparia maderensis Rebel, 1940

Species of moth

Eudonia decorella is a species of moth in the family Crambidae. It is found on the Canary Islands and Madeira.
