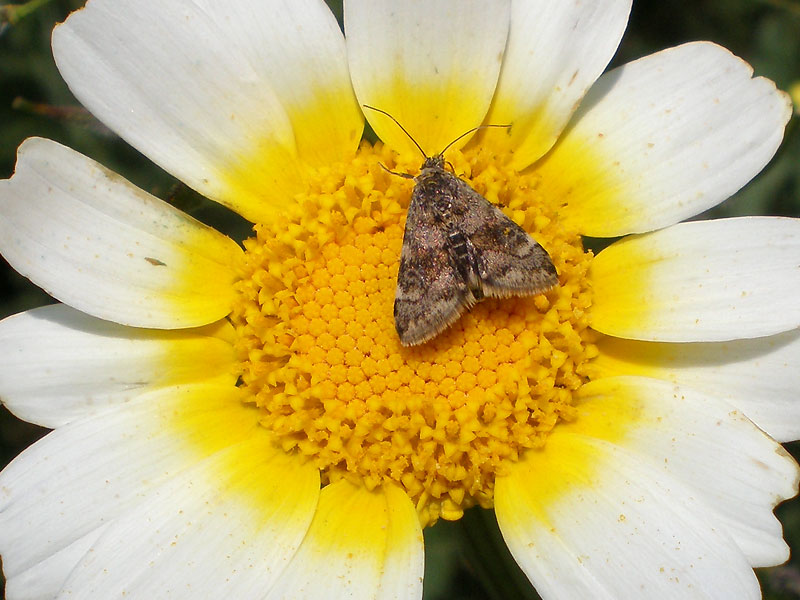

Scientific classification
- Kingdom: Animalia
- Phylum: Arthropoda
- Clade: Pancrustacea
- Class: Insecta
- Order: Lepidoptera
- Family: Crambidae
- Genus: Aporodes
- Species: A. floralis

Binomial name
- Aporodes floralis (Hübner, 1809)

Synonyms
- Pyralis floralis Hübner, 1809; Noctuelia floralis; Eudorea transversalis Moore, 1878; Noctuelia floralis var. grisealis Caradja, 1916; Herbula meleagrisalis Walker, 1859; Pyrausta conversalis Duponchel, 1834; Pyrausta siculalis Duponchel, 1833; Noctuelia floralis var. stygialis Treitschke, 1829

= Aporodes floralis =

Species of moth

Aporodes floralis is a species of moth in the family Crambidae first described by Jacob Hübner in 1809. It is found in most of continental Europe (except the Benelux, and the Baltic region), Algeria, Syria, Afghanistan, central Asia, north-western India and Yemen

The wingspan is 15–20 mm. Adults are on wing from May to the beginning of October in two generations per year.

The larvae feed on Cynara cardunculus and Convolvulus arvensis.
