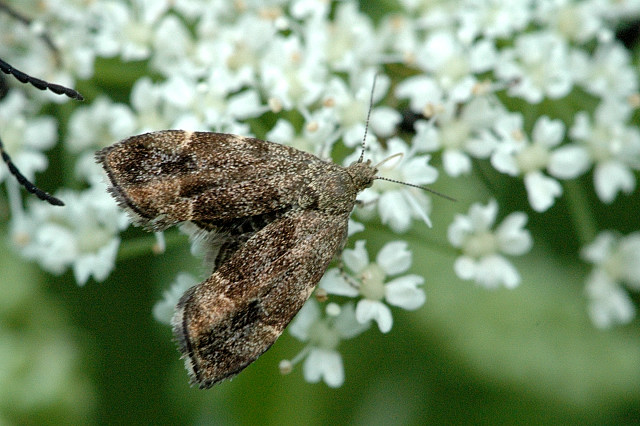
- Anthophila fabriciana

Scientific classification
- Domain: Eukaryota
- Kingdom: Animalia
- Phylum: Arthropoda
- Class: Insecta
- Order: Lepidoptera
- Family: Choreutidae
- Subfamily: Choreutinae
- Genus: Anthophila; Haworth [1811]

Synonyms
- Simaethis Leach, 1815; Xylopoda Berthold, 1827

= Anthophila (moth) =

Genus of moths

Anthophila, from Ancient Greek ἄνθος (ánthos), meaning "flower", and φίλος (phílos), meaning "loving", is a genus of moths in the family Choreutidae.

== Species ==
- Anthophila abhasica Danilevsky, 1969
- Anthophila alpinella (Busck, 1904)
- Anthophila armata Danilevsky, 1969
- Anthophila bidzilyai Budashkin, 1997
- Anthophila brachymorpha (Meyrick, 1915)
- Anthophila colchica Danilevsky, 1969
- Anthophila decolorana Danilevsky, 1969
- Anthophila dischides Diakonoff, 1978
- Anthophila fabriciana (Linnaeus, 1767)
- Anthophila filipjevi Danilevsky, 1969
- Anthophila latarniki Guillermet, 2010
- Anthophila ludifica (Meyrick, 1914)
- Anthophila massaicae Agassiz, 2008
- Anthophila oreina Diakonoff, 1979
- Anthophila threnodes (Walsingham, 1910)

== Former species ==
- Anthophila achyrodes (Meyrick, 1912)
- Anthophila equatoris (Walsingham, 1897)
- Anthophila flavimaculata (Walsingham, 1891)
- Anthophila fulminea (Meyrick, 1912)
- Anthophila ialeura (Meyrick, 1912)
- Anthophila psilachyra (Meyrick, 1912)
- Anthophila submarginalis (Walker, 1865)
- Anthophila torridula (Meyrick, 1926)
- Anthophila turilega (Meyrick, 1924)
