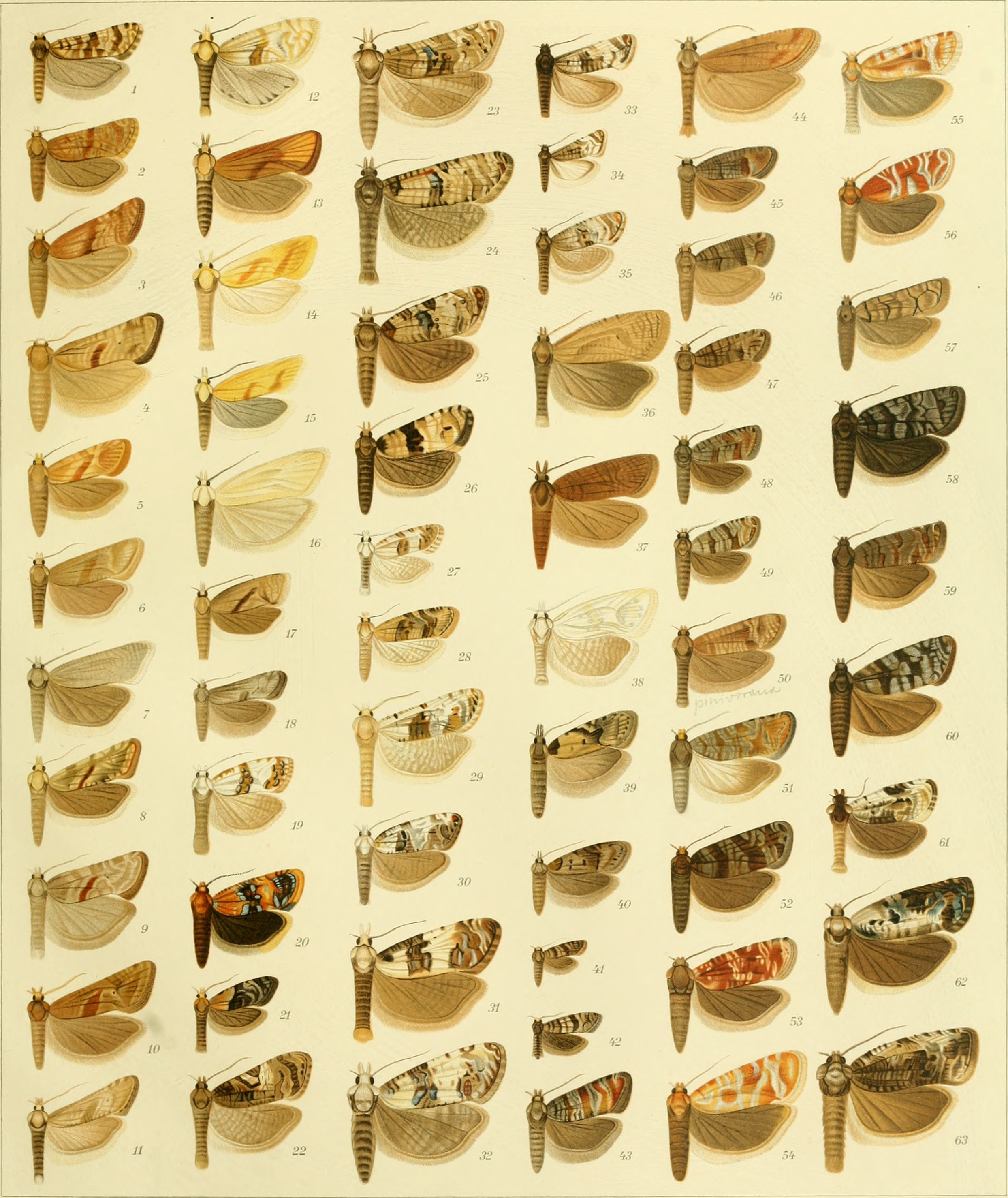
- Clavigesta sylvestrana in Kennel Die palaearktischen tortriciden figures 45, 46, 47 females

Scientific classification
- Domain: Eukaryota
- Kingdom: Animalia
- Phylum: Arthropoda
- Class: Insecta
- Order: Lepidoptera
- Family: Tortricidae
- Genus: Clavigesta
- Species: C. sylvestrana

Binomial name
- Clavigesta sylvestrana (Curtis, 1850)

Synonyms
- Spilonota sylvestrana Curtis, 1850; Retinia pollinis Millire, 1874

= Clavigesta sylvestrana =

Species of moth

Clavigesta sylvestrana is a moth of the family Tortricidae. It is found in the western and north-western Baltic region, England, France, the Netherlands, Belgium, Germany and Madeira.

The wingspan is 12–15 mm. The head and thorax are grey, whitish - sprinkled. The Forewings are narrow, dark fuscous white with numerous thick obscure leaden-metallic striae; the straight edge of the basal patch and the vertical postmedian fascia are darker. The apical area is suffused with ferruginous. The hindwings are fuscous. The larva is dull reddish-brown; head black; plate of 2 dark brown :

Adults are on wing in June and July.

The larvae feed on Pinus pinaster, Pinus pinea, Pinus sylvestris, Abies alba and Picea abies. The feeding is confined to a zone usually between one and three meters above ground level.
