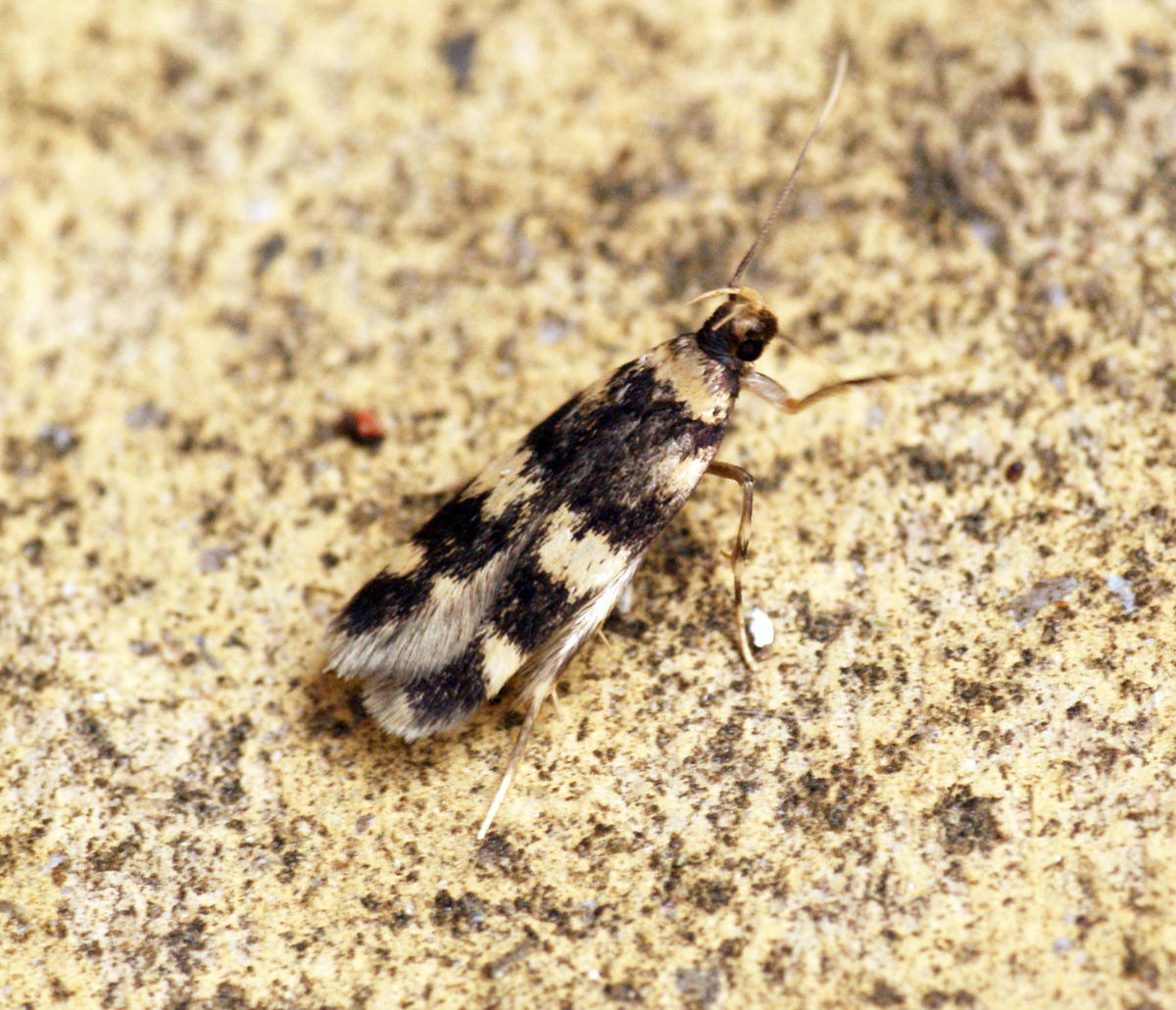

Scientific classification
- Domain: Eukaryota
- Kingdom: Animalia
- Phylum: Arthropoda
- Class: Insecta
- Order: Lepidoptera
- Family: Autostichidae
- Genus: Oegoconia
- Species: O. caradjai

Binomial name
- Oegoconia caradjai Popescu-Gorj and Capuse, 1965

= Oegoconia caradjai =

Species of moth

Oegoconia caradjai is a species of moth of the family Autostichidae. It is known from most of Europe, except Fennoscandia and the north-east, and from North Africa (Morocco) and West Asia (Turkey). It is also found in New Zealand as an established exotic.

The wingspan is about 15 mm. Adults are on wing from June to August in a single generation in western Europe. Indoors, they can be observed till October. The larvae feed on leaf litter and vegetable detritus, including waste of straw in barns and stables.
