= Glyphipterix pygmaeella =

Scientific classification
- Kingdom: Animalia
- Phylum: Arthropoda
- Clade: Pancrustacea
- Class: Insecta
- Order: Lepidoptera
- Family: Glyphipterigidae
- Genus: Glyphipterix
- Species: G. pygmaeella

Binomial name
- Glyphipterix pygmaeella Rebel, 1896

Species of moth

Glyphipterix pygmaeella is a moth of the family Glyphipterigidae. It is found on the Canary Islands and in Hungary and Romania.

The wingspan is 7-7.5 mm.
