= Festuca donax =

Scientific classification
- Kingdom: Plantae
- Clade: Tracheophytes
- Clade: Angiosperms
- Clade: Monocots
- Clade: Commelinids
- Order: Poales
- Family: Poaceae
- Subfamily: Pooideae
- Genus: Festuca
- Species: F. donax

Binomial name
- Festuca donax Lowe

Synonyms
- Drymochloa donax (Lowe) H.Scholz & Foggi

Species of grass

Festuca donax is a species of grass. It is native to the Madeira archipelago in the Atlantic Ocean.

== Description ==
The plant is perennial and caespitose with 60–120 centimetres (24–47 in) long culms that grow in a clump. The ligule is 3–5 millimetres (0.12–0.20 in) long and is going around the eciliate membrane. Leaf-blades are 5–10 centimetres (2.0–3.9 in) broad with scabrous margins. The panicle is elliptic, open, inflorescenced and is 18–30 centimetres (7.1–11.8 in) long. Spikelets are elliptic, solitary, 5.5–6.5 millimetres (0.22–0.26 in) long, and carry fertile ones which have 2–3 fertile florets that are diminished at the apex.

The glumes are chartaceous, lanceolate, keelless, with acuminate apexes, with only difference is in size. The upper one is 5–6.2 millimetres (0.20–0.24 in) long while the other one is 4.5–5.3 millimetres (0.18–0.21 in) long. Fertile lemma is 4.4–5.2 millimetres (0.17–0.20 in) long and is also chartaceous, ovate and keelless. Lemma itself is muticous with acute apex and scaberulous surface. Flowers have a hairy ovary and three stamens that are 3 millimetres (0.12 in) long. The fruits are caryopses with an additional pericarp, which just like flowers is hairy as well. Hilum is linear.
