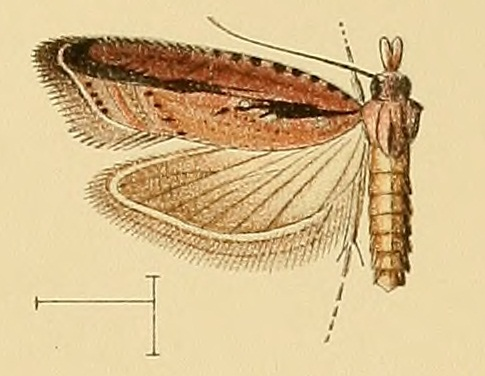

Scientific classification
- Domain: Eukaryota
- Kingdom: Animalia
- Phylum: Arthropoda
- Class: Insecta
- Order: Lepidoptera
- Family: Tortricidae
- Genus: Acroclita
- Species: A. guanchana

Binomial name
- Acroclita guanchana Walsingham, 1907

= Acroclita guanchana =

Species of moth

Acroclita guanchana is a moth of the family Tortricidae. It is found on the Canary Islands and Madeira.

The wingspan is 12–15 mm.

The larvae have been recorded feeding on the leaves of Hypericum grandifolium.
