= Scopula irrorata =

Scientific classification
- Domain: Eukaryota
- Kingdom: Animalia
- Phylum: Arthropoda
- Class: Insecta
- Order: Lepidoptera
- Family: Geometridae
- Genus: Scopula
- Species: S. irrorata

Binomial name
- Scopula irrorata (Bethune-Baker, 1891)

Synonyms
- Acidalia irrorata Bethune-Baker, 1891

Species of geometer moth in subfamily Sterrhinae

Scopula irrorata is a moth of the family Geometridae. It is found on Madeira and the Canary Islands.

The wingspan is about 26 mm.
