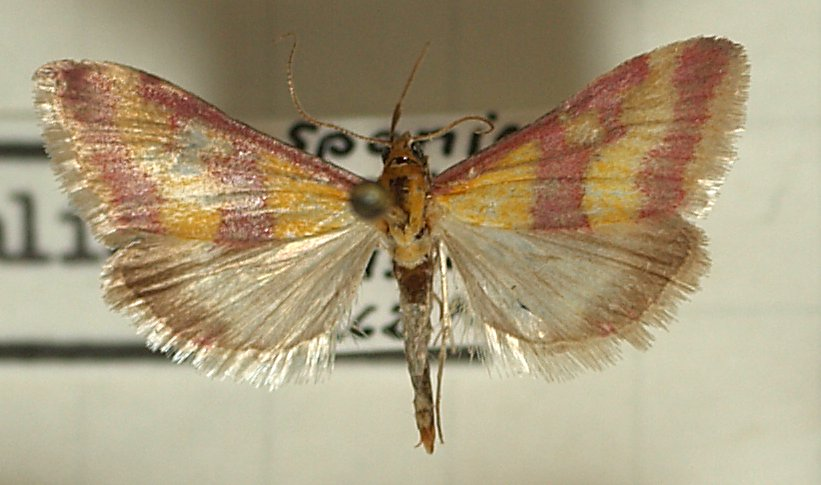

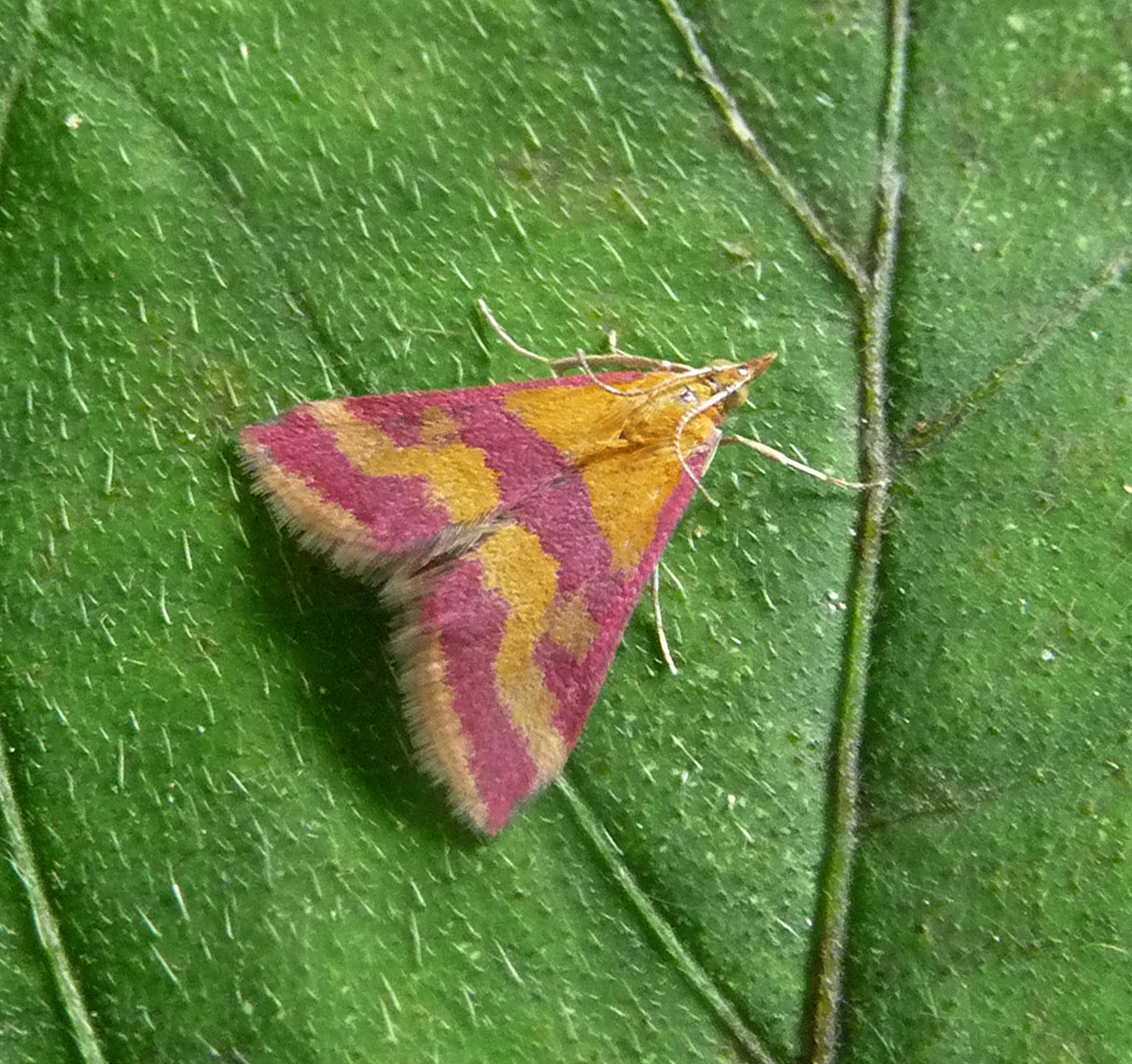

Scientific classification
- Kingdom: Animalia
- Phylum: Arthropoda
- Class: Insecta
- Order: Lepidoptera
- Family: Crambidae
- Genus: Pyrausta
- Species: P. sanguinalis

Binomial name
- Pyrausta sanguinalis (Linnaeus, 1767)

Synonyms
- Phalaena sanguinalis Linnaeus, 1767; Pyrausta sanguinalis priscalis Caradja in Caradja & Meyrick, 1935; Pyralis haematalis Hübner, 1796

= Pyrausta sanguinalis =

Species of moth

Pyrausta sanguinalis, the scarce crimson and gold, is a moth of the family Crambidae. The species was first described by Carl Linnaeus in his 1767 12th edition of Systema Naturae.

The wingspan is 14–18 mm. The forewings are brownish ochreous, basal and dorsal areas deep yellow, disc yellow mixed; markings purple-crimson; a streak along costa to 3/4; a fascia before middle; an oblong discal spot, connected above with costal streak, and sometimes beneath with preceding fascia; a subterminal fascia. Hindwings in male light grey, darker terminally, in female grey; termen crimson in middle. The larva is greenish-grey, reddish tinged; subdorsal and spiracular lines whitish; head brown.

The moth flies from June to August depending on the location.

The larvae feed on common sage, rosemary and thyme.
