= Phyllonorycter chiclanella =

Scientific classification
- Domain: Eukaryota
- Kingdom: Animalia
- Phylum: Arthropoda
- Class: Insecta
- Order: Lepidoptera
- Family: Gracillariidae
- Genus: Phyllonorycter
- Species: P. chiclanella

Binomial name
- Phyllonorycter chiclanella (Staudinger, 1859)

Synonyms
- Lithocolletis chiclanella Staudinger, 1859

Species of moth

Phyllonorycter chiclanella is a moth of the family Gracillariidae. It is known from Spain, Portugal and Madeira.

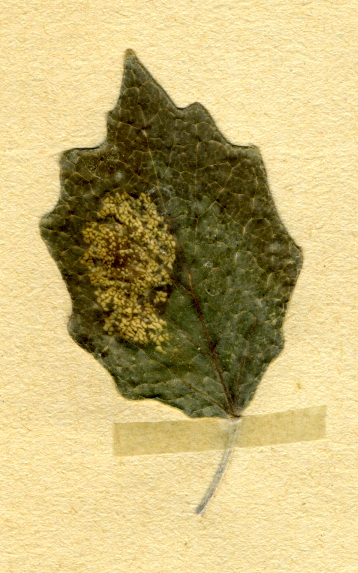
Mine of Phyllonorycter chiclanella
