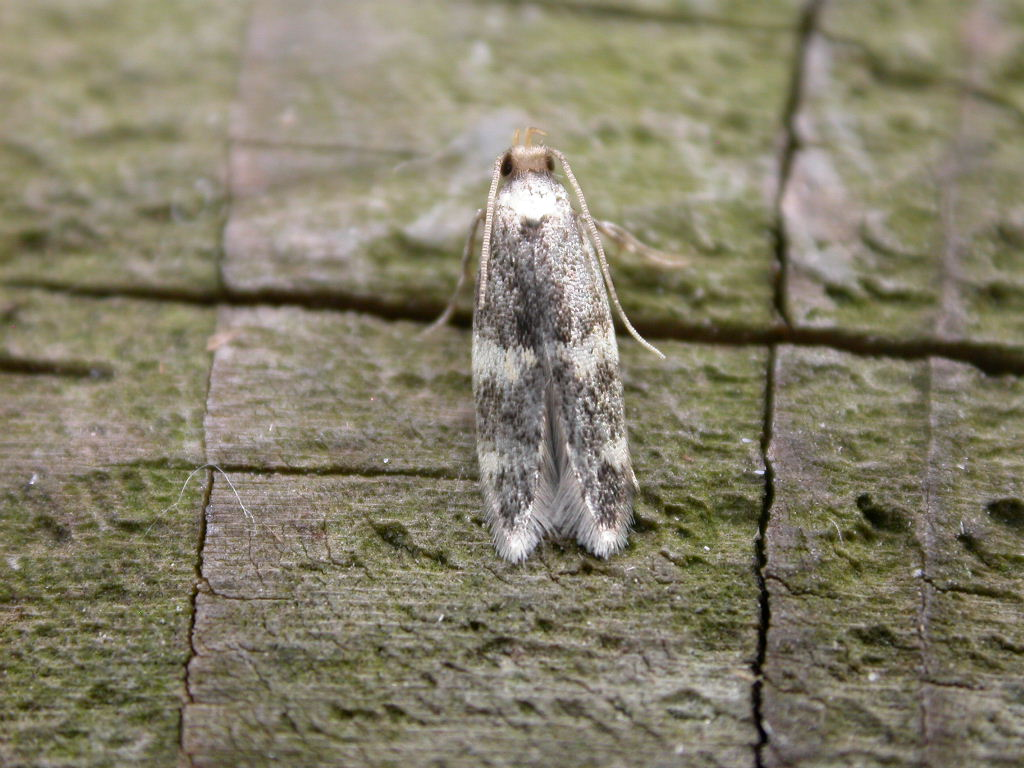

Scientific classification
- Domain: Eukaryota
- Kingdom: Animalia
- Phylum: Arthropoda
- Class: Insecta
- Order: Lepidoptera
- Family: Autostichidae
- Genus: Oegoconia
- Species: O. deauratella

Binomial name
- Oegoconia deauratella (Herrich-Schäffer, 1854)

Synonyms
- Lampros deauratella Herrich-Schaffer 1854; Oegoconia bacescui Popescu-Gorj & Capuse, 1965

= Oegoconia deauratella =

Species of moth

Oegoconia deauratella is a species of gelechioid moth. It is known from most of Europe, as well as North America, where it has been recorded from Québec, Ontario and Michigan.

The wingspan is 11–15 mm.

The larva probably feed on dried and decaying vegetable matter.
