= Neurotomia coenulentella =

Scientific classification
- Kingdom: Animalia
- Phylum: Arthropoda
- Clade: Pancrustacea
- Class: Insecta
- Order: Lepidoptera
- Family: Pyralidae
- Genus: Neurotomia
- Species: N. coenulentella

Binomial name
- Neurotomia coenulentella (Zeller, 1846)

Synonyms
- Nephopteryx coenulentella Zeller, 1846; Ciliocerodes coenulentella; Sciota coenulentella; Neurotomia algeriella Chrétien, 1911

Species of moth

Neurotomia coenulentella is a species of moth in the family Pyralidae. It was described by Philipp Christoph Zeller in 1846. It is found in Spain, Portugal, France, Greece, on Sardinia, Corsica, Malta, Sicily and Algeria.
