= Phyllonorycter juncei =

Scientific classification
- Domain: Eukaryota
- Kingdom: Animalia
- Phylum: Arthropoda
- Class: Insecta
- Order: Lepidoptera
- Family: Gracillariidae
- Genus: Phyllonorycter
- Species: P. juncei

Binomial name
- Phyllonorycter juncei (Walsingham, 1908)

Synonyms
- Lithocolletis juncei Walsingham, 1908; Phyllonorycter madeirae Deschka, 1976

Species of moth

Phyllonorycter juncei is a moth of the family Gracillariidae. It is known from the Canary Islands and Madeira.

The larvae feed on Genista tenera, Teline maderensis, Teline stenopetala and Spartium junceum. They mine the leaves of their host plant.

== Subspecies ==
  - Phyllonorycter juncei juncei (Canary Islands)
  - Phyllonorycter juncei madeirae Deschka, 1976 (Madeira)
