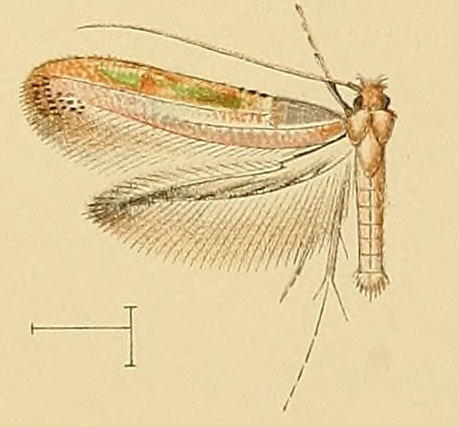

Scientific classification
- Domain: Eukaryota
- Kingdom: Animalia
- Phylum: Arthropoda
- Class: Insecta
- Order: Lepidoptera
- Family: Gracillariidae
- Genus: Caloptilia
- Species: C. coruscans

Binomial name
- Caloptilia coruscans (Walsingham, 1907)

Synonyms
- Gracilaria coruscans Walsingham, 1907

= Caloptilia coruscans =

Species of moth

Caloptilia coruscans is a moth of the family Gracillariidae. It is known from south-western Europe and Thrace.

The larvae feed on Pistacia atlantica, Pistacia lentiscus, Rhus doica, Rhus oxyacanthoides and Schinus molle. They mine the leaves of their host plant.
