= Carposina anopta =

Scientific classification
- Kingdom: Animalia
- Phylum: Arthropoda
- Clade: Pancrustacea
- Class: Insecta
- Order: Lepidoptera
- Family: Carposinidae
- Genus: Carposina
- Species: C. anopta

Binomial name
- Carposina anopta Diakonoff, 1988

Species of moth

Carposina anopta is a moth in the family Carposinidae. It is found on Madeira.

The wingspan is about 15–17 mm (0.59–0.67 in) for males and 18 mm (0.71 in) for females.
