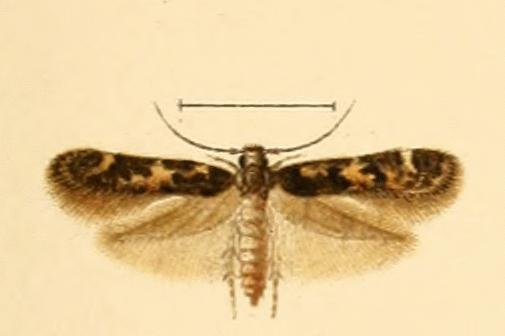

Scientific classification
- Domain: Eukaryota
- Kingdom: Animalia
- Phylum: Arthropoda
- Class: Insecta
- Order: Lepidoptera
- Family: Autostichidae
- Genus: Apatema
- Species: A. coarctella

Binomial name
- Apatema coarctella (Rebel, 1896)

Synonyms
- Lampros coarctella Rebel, 1896; Dysallomima coarctella Rebel, 1896

= Apatema coarctella =

Species of moth

Apatema coarctella is a moth of the family Autostichidae. It is found on the Canary Islands and Madeira.

The wingspan is about 9–10 mm. The ground colour of the forewings is yellowish, sprinkled with blackish-grey. The hindwings are grey.
