= List of moths of Eswatini =

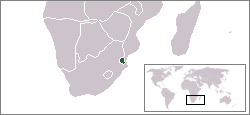
Location of Eswatini

There are about 35 known moths of Eswatini. The moths (mostly nocturnal) and butterflies (mostly diurnal) together make up the taxonomic order Lepidoptera.

This is a list of moth species which have been recorded in Eswatini (formerly Swaziland).

== Arctiidae ==
- Amerila mulleri Häuser & Boppré, 1997
- Lepista aposema Kühne, 2010

== Crambidae ==
- Pyrausta apicalis (Hampson, 1913)

== Geometridae ==
- Drepanogynis admiranda (Warren, 1905)
- Drepanogynis arcuifera Prout, 1934
- Drepanogynis cambogiaria (Guenée, 1858)
- Drepanogynis chromatina (Prout, 1913)
- Drepanogynis costipicta (Prout, 1932)
- Drepanogynis determinata (Walker, 1860)
- Drepanogynis devia (Prout, 1913)
- Drepanogynis gloriola (Prout, 1913)
- Drepanogynis hypenissa (Butler, 1875)
- Drepanogynis latipennis Krüger, 2002
- Drepanogynis leptodoma Prout, 1917
- Drepanogynis mixtaria Guenée, 1858
- Drepanogynis olivescens (Warren, 1898)
- Drepanogynis punctata (Warren, 1897)
- Drepanogynis subrosea Krüger, 2002
- Drepanogynis variciliata Krüger, 2002

== Gracillariidae ==
- Phyllocnistis citrella Stainton, 1856

== Lasiocampidae ==
- Bombycomorpha bifascia (Walker, 1855)

== Lasiocampidae ==
- Braura ligniclusa (Walker, 1865)
- Eutricha morosa (Walker, 1865)

== Notodontidae ==
- Antheua ornata (Walker, 1865)

== Pterophoridae ==
- Exelastis atomosa (Walsingham, 1885)
- Hepalastis pumilio (Zeller, 1873)
- Lantanophaga pusillidactylus (Walker, 1864)
- Megalorhipida leucodactylus (Fabricius, 1794)
- Sphenarches anisodactylus (Walker, 1864)
- Stenodacma wahlbergi (Zeller, 1852)

== Saturniidae ==
- Gonimbrasia wahlbergii (Boisduval, 1847)

== Sphingidae ==
- Oligographa juniperi (Boisduval, 1847)

== Tortricidae ==
- Clepsis gnathocera Razowski, 2006
- Megalota lobotona (Meyrick, 1921)
- Metendothenia balanacma (Meyrick, 1914)
- Orilesa olearis (Meyrick, 1912)
