= Clepsis trileucana =

Scientific classification
- Kingdom: Animalia
- Phylum: Arthropoda
- Clade: Pancrustacea
- Class: Insecta
- Order: Lepidoptera
- Family: Tortricidae
- Genus: Clepsis
- Species: C. trileucana

Binomial name
- Clepsis trileucana (Doubleday, 1847)

Synonyms
- Sericoris trileucana Doubleday, 1847

Species of moth

Clepsis trileucana is a species of moth of the family Tortricidae. It is found in the United States, where it has been recorded from Maine, New Hampshire, New Mexico and West Virginia. Two specimens of this species were recorded from Cornwall in the 1830s, but the species has not been recorded in Great Britain since.

Adults have been recorded on wing from June to July.
