= Clepsis crispinana =

Scientific classification
- Kingdom: Animalia
- Phylum: Arthropoda
- Clade: Pancrustacea
- Class: Insecta
- Order: Lepidoptera
- Family: Tortricidae
- Genus: Clepsis
- Species: C. crispinana

Binomial name
- Clepsis crispinana (Kennel, 1919)

Synonyms
- Tortrix crispinana Kennel, 1919

Species of moth

Clepsis crispinana is a species of moth of the family Tortricidae. It is found in Russia (Altai Mountains, Sayan Mountains) and Mongolia.

The wingspan is about 23 mm.
