= Clepsis laetitiae =

Scientific classification
- Kingdom: Animalia
- Phylum: Arthropoda
- Clade: Pancrustacea
- Class: Insecta
- Order: Lepidoptera
- Family: Tortricidae
- Genus: Clepsis
- Species: C. laetitiae

Binomial name
- Clepsis laetitiae Soria, 1997

Species of moth

Clepsis laetitiae is a species of moth of the family Tortricidae. It is found in Spain.

The wingspan is 19–22 mm. Adults have been recorded on wing from April to May.

The larvae feed on Vella pseudocitysus sub. pseudocitysus.

== Etymology ==
The species is named for Leticia Soria Ruiz-Ogarrio.
