= Clepsis capnosticha =

Scientific classification
- Kingdom: Animalia
- Phylum: Arthropoda
- Clade: Pancrustacea
- Class: Insecta
- Order: Lepidoptera
- Family: Tortricidae
- Genus: Clepsis
- Species: C. capnosticha

Binomial name
- Clepsis capnosticha (Meyrick, 1917)

Synonyms
- Tortrix capnosticha Meyrick, 1917

Species of moth

Clepsis capnosticha is a species of moth of the family Tortricidae. It is found in Peru.
