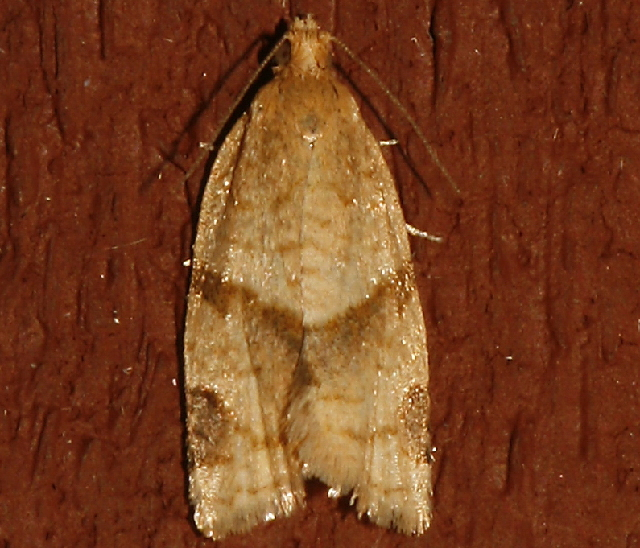

Scientific classification
- Kingdom: Animalia
- Phylum: Arthropoda
- Clade: Pancrustacea
- Class: Insecta
- Order: Lepidoptera
- Family: Tortricidae
- Genus: Clepsis
- Species: C. penetralis

Binomial name
- Clepsis penetralis Razowski, 1979

= Clepsis penetralis =

Species of moth

Clepsis penetralis is a species of moth of the family Tortricidae. It is found in North America, where it has been recorded from Utah, Colorado, Vermont, Washington and southern Canada.

The length of the forewings is 6–7.5 mm. Adults are on wing from late June to early September.
