= Clepsis tetraplegma =

Scientific classification
- Kingdom: Animalia
- Phylum: Arthropoda
- Clade: Pancrustacea
- Class: Insecta
- Order: Lepidoptera
- Family: Tortricidae
- Genus: Clepsis
- Species: C. tetraplegma

Binomial name
- Clepsis tetraplegma (Diakonoff, 1957)

Synonyms
- Clepsodes tetraplegma Diakonoff, 1957

Species of moth

Clepsis tetraplegma is a species of moth of the family Tortricidae. It is found on Réunion in the Indian Ocean.
