= Clepsis parva =

Scientific classification
- Kingdom: Animalia
- Phylum: Arthropoda
- Clade: Pancrustacea
- Class: Insecta
- Order: Lepidoptera
- Family: Tortricidae
- Genus: Clepsis
- Species: C. parva

Binomial name
- Clepsis parva Razowski, 2004

Species of moth

Clepsis parva is a species of moth of the family Tortricidae. It is found in Ecuador in Pichincha-Septimo Paraiso Reserve.

The wingspan is 10–11 mm.
