= Clepsis misgurna =

Scientific classification
- Kingdom: Animalia
- Phylum: Arthropoda
- Clade: Pancrustacea
- Class: Insecta
- Order: Lepidoptera
- Family: Tortricidae
- Genus: Clepsis
- Species: C. misgurna

Binomial name
- Clepsis misgurna Razowski, 1992

Species of moth

Clepsis misgurna is a species of moth of the family Tortricidae. It is found in Costa Rica.
