= Clepsis subjunctana =

Scientific classification
- Kingdom: Animalia
- Phylum: Arthropoda
- Clade: Pancrustacea
- Class: Insecta
- Order: Lepidoptera
- Family: Tortricidae
- Genus: Clepsis
- Species: C. subjunctana

Binomial name
- Clepsis subjunctana (Wollaston, 1858)

Synonyms
- Tortrix subjunctana Wollaston, 1858

Species of moth

Clepsis subjunctana is a species of moth of the family Tortricidae. It is found on Madeira.
