= Clepsis micromys =

Scientific classification
- Kingdom: Animalia
- Phylum: Arthropoda
- Clade: Pancrustacea
- Class: Insecta
- Order: Lepidoptera
- Family: Tortricidae
- Genus: Clepsis
- Species: C. micromys

Binomial name
- Clepsis micromys (Stringer, 1929)

Synonyms
- Tortrix micromys Stringer, 1929

Species of moth

Clepsis micromys is a species of moth of the family Tortricidae. It is found in Syria and Lebanon.
