= Clepsis uncisecta =

Scientific classification
- Kingdom: Animalia
- Phylum: Arthropoda
- Clade: Pancrustacea
- Class: Insecta
- Order: Lepidoptera
- Family: Tortricidae
- Genus: Clepsis
- Species: C. uncisecta

Binomial name
- Clepsis uncisecta Razowski & Wolff, in Razowski, 1998

Species of moth

Clepsis uncisecta is a species of moth of the family Tortricidae. It is found on Madeira.
