= Clepsis banhadana =

Scientific classification
- Kingdom: Animalia
- Phylum: Arthropoda
- Clade: Pancrustacea
- Class: Insecta
- Order: Lepidoptera
- Family: Tortricidae
- Genus: Clepsis
- Species: C. banhadana

Binomial name
- Clepsis banhadana Razowski & Becker, 2003

Species of moth

Clepsis banhadana is a species of moth of the family Tortricidae. It is found in Paraná, Brazil.
