= Clepsis bertiogana =

Scientific classification
- Kingdom: Animalia
- Phylum: Arthropoda
- Clade: Pancrustacea
- Class: Insecta
- Order: Lepidoptera
- Family: Tortricidae
- Genus: Clepsis
- Species: C. bertiogana

Binomial name
- Clepsis bertiogana Razowski & Becker, 2010

Species of moth

Clepsis bertiogana is a species of moth of the family Tortricidae. It is found in São Paulo, Brazil.

The wingspan is about 11 mm.
