= Clepsis laxa =

Scientific classification
- Kingdom: Animalia
- Phylum: Arthropoda
- Clade: Pancrustacea
- Class: Insecta
- Order: Lepidoptera
- Family: Tortricidae
- Genus: Clepsis
- Species: C. laxa

Binomial name
- Clepsis laxa Razowski, 1979

Species of moth

Clepsis laxa is a species of moth of the family Tortricidae. It is found in Chihuahua, Mexico.
