= Clepsis flavidana =

Scientific classification
- Kingdom: Animalia
- Phylum: Arthropoda
- Clade: Pancrustacea
- Class: Insecta
- Order: Lepidoptera
- Family: Tortricidae
- Genus: Clepsis
- Species: C. flavidana

Binomial name
- Clepsis flavidana (McDunnough, 1923)

Synonyms
- Tortrix flavidana McDunnough, 1923

Species of moth

Clepsis flavidana is a species of moth of the family Tortricidae. It is found in North America, where it has been recorded from Manitoba, Maryland, Minnesota and Wisconsin.

The wingspan is 26–28 mm. Adults have been recorded on wing from June to August.

The larvae feed on Rosa species.
