= Clepsis chlorodoxa =

Scientific classification
- Kingdom: Animalia
- Phylum: Arthropoda
- Clade: Pancrustacea
- Class: Insecta
- Order: Lepidoptera
- Family: Tortricidae
- Genus: Clepsis
- Species: C. chlorodoxa

Binomial name
- Clepsis chlorodoxa (Meyrick, 1920)

Synonyms
- Tortrix chlorodoxa Meyrick, 1920

Species of moth

Clepsis chlorodoxa is a species of moth of the family Tortricidae. It is found in India (Punjab).

== See also ==
- List of moths of India
