= Clepsis celsana =

Scientific classification
- Kingdom: Animalia
- Phylum: Arthropoda
- Clade: Pancrustacea
- Class: Insecta
- Order: Lepidoptera
- Family: Tortricidae
- Genus: Clepsis
- Species: C. celsana

Binomial name
- Clepsis celsana (Kennel, 1919)

Synonyms
- Cacoecia celsana Kennel, 1919

Species of moth

Clepsis celsana is a species of moth of the family Tortricidae. It is found in Russia, Kazakhstan and Xinjiang, China.
