= Clepsis zelleriana =

Scientific classification
- Kingdom: Animalia
- Phylum: Arthropoda
- Clade: Pancrustacea
- Class: Insecta
- Order: Lepidoptera
- Family: Tortricidae
- Genus: Clepsis
- Species: C. zelleriana

Binomial name
- Clepsis zelleriana (Erschoff, 1874)

Synonyms
- Penthina zelleriana Erschoff, 1874

Species of moth

Clepsis zelleriana is a species of moth of the family Tortricidae. It is found in Turkmenistan.
