= Clepsis microceria =

Scientific classification
- Kingdom: Animalia
- Phylum: Arthropoda
- Clade: Pancrustacea
- Class: Insecta
- Order: Lepidoptera
- Family: Tortricidae
- Genus: Clepsis
- Species: C. microceria

Binomial name
- Clepsis microceria Razowski & Wojtusiak, 2010

Species of moth

Clepsis microceria is a species of moth of the family Tortricidae. It is found in Peru.

The wingspan is about 18 mm.
