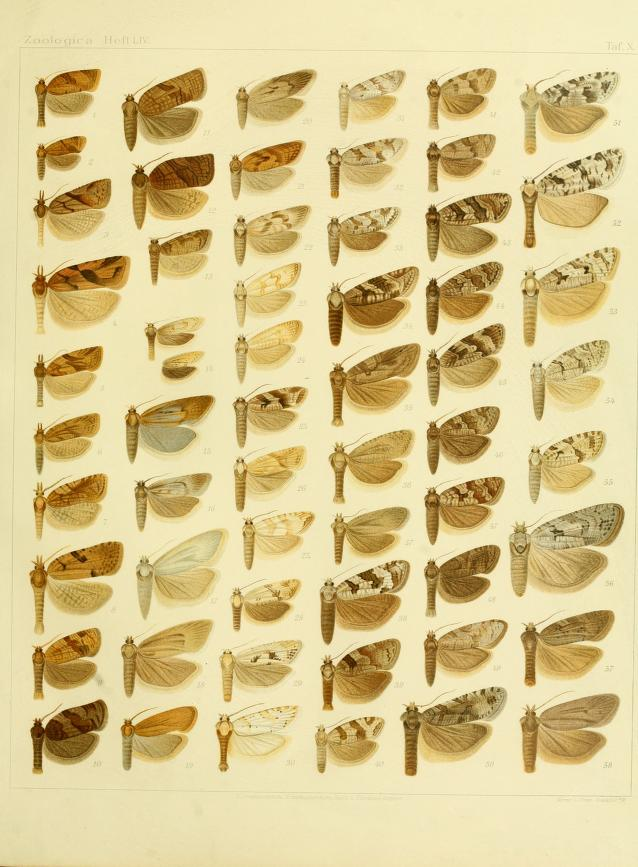
- Clepsis subcostana in Kennel Die palaearktischen tortriciden figure 3 male, figure 4 female

Scientific classification
- Kingdom: Animalia
- Phylum: Arthropoda
- Clade: Pancrustacea
- Class: Insecta
- Order: Lepidoptera
- Family: Tortricidae
- Genus: Clepsis
- Species: C. subcostana

Binomial name
- Clepsis subcostana (Stainton, 1859)

Synonyms
- Tortrix subcostana Stainton, 1859

= Clepsis subcostana =

Species of moth

Clepsis subcostana is a species of moth of the family Tortricidae. It is found on Madeira.
