= Clepsis anderslaneyii =

Scientific classification
- Kingdom: Animalia
- Phylum: Arthropoda
- Clade: Pancrustacea
- Class: Insecta
- Order: Lepidoptera
- Family: Tortricidae
- Genus: Clepsis
- Species: C. anderslaneyii

Binomial name
- Clepsis anderslaneyii Dombroskie & J.W. Brown, 2009

Species of moth

Clepsis anderslaneyii is a species of moth of the family Tortricidae. It is found in the Chiricahua, Huachuca and Santa Rita mountains in south-eastern Arizona, United States, where it has been recorded at altitudes ranging from 1,490 to 1,770 meters.

The length of the forewings is 8.5–9 mm for males and 8–9.5 mm for females. The ground color of the forewings is straw yellow with dark brown speckling. The hindwings are white, sometimes suffused with light brown on the outer margins. Adults have been recorded on wing from July to August, probably in one generation per year.

== Etymology ==
The species is named in honor of the marriage of Sara Anderson and Malcolm Slaney.
