= Clepsis balcanica =

Scientific classification
- Kingdom: Animalia
- Phylum: Arthropoda
- Clade: Pancrustacea
- Class: Insecta
- Order: Lepidoptera
- Family: Tortricidae
- Genus: Clepsis
- Species: C. balcanica

Binomial name
- Clepsis balcanica (Rebel, 1917)

Synonyms
- Tortrix steineriana balcanica Rebel, 1917; Tortrix balcanica Rebel, 1917; Tortrix wassiana Schmidt, 1930

Species of moth

Clepsis balcanica is a species of moth of the family Tortricidae. It is found in Albania, Bosnia and Herzegovina, Serbia, Bulgaria, Romania and North Macedonia.

The wingspan is 16–19 mm for males and about 18 mm for females. Adults have been recorded on wing from June to July.
