= Clepsis scaeodoxa =

Scientific classification
- Kingdom: Animalia
- Phylum: Arthropoda
- Clade: Pancrustacea
- Class: Insecta
- Order: Lepidoptera
- Family: Tortricidae
- Genus: Clepsis
- Species: C. scaeodoxa

Binomial name
- Clepsis scaeodoxa (Meyrick, 1935)

Synonyms
- Tortrix scaeodoxa Meyrick, 1935

Species of moth

Clepsis scaeodoxa is a species of moth of the family Tortricidae. It is found in the Democratic Republic of Congo.
