= Clepsis gerasimovi =

Scientific classification
- Kingdom: Animalia
- Phylum: Arthropoda
- Clade: Pancrustacea
- Class: Insecta
- Order: Lepidoptera
- Family: Tortricidae
- Genus: Clepsis
- Species: C. gerasimovi

Binomial name
- Clepsis gerasimovi Danilevsky, 1963

Species of moth

Clepsis gerasimovi is a species of moth of the family Tortricidae. It is found in Uzbekistan and Tajikistan.

== Taxonomy ==
The species was described by Danilevsky in 1963. The original description was published in Entomologicheskoe Obozrenie 42: 164.
