= Clepsis metalleta =

Scientific classification
- Kingdom: Animalia
- Phylum: Arthropoda
- Clade: Pancrustacea
- Class: Insecta
- Order: Lepidoptera
- Family: Tortricidae
- Genus: Clepsis
- Species: C. metalleta

Binomial name
- Clepsis metalleta (Walsingham, 1914)

Synonyms
- Tortrix metalleta Walsingham, 1914

Species of moth

Clepsis metalleta is a species of moth of the family Tortricidae. It is found in Guerrero, Mexico.

The wingspan is about 15 mm. The forewings are yellowish-brown, spotted with shining leaden grey metallic scales. The hindwings are tawny grey.
