= Clepsis diversa =

Scientific classification
- Kingdom: Animalia
- Phylum: Arthropoda
- Clade: Pancrustacea
- Class: Insecta
- Order: Lepidoptera
- Family: Tortricidae
- Genus: Clepsis
- Species: C. diversa

Binomial name
- Clepsis diversa Razowski & Becker, 2010

Species of moth

Clepsis diversa is a species of moth of the family Tortricidae. It is found in Nuevo León, Mexico.

The wingspan is about 13 mm.
