= Clepsis eura =

Scientific classification
- Kingdom: Animalia
- Phylum: Arthropoda
- Clade: Pancrustacea
- Class: Insecta
- Order: Lepidoptera
- Family: Tortricidae
- Genus: Clepsis
- Species: C. eura

Binomial name
- Clepsis eura Razowski, 1979

Species of moth

Clepsis eura is a species of moth of the family Tortricidae. It is found in Sinaloa, Mexico.
