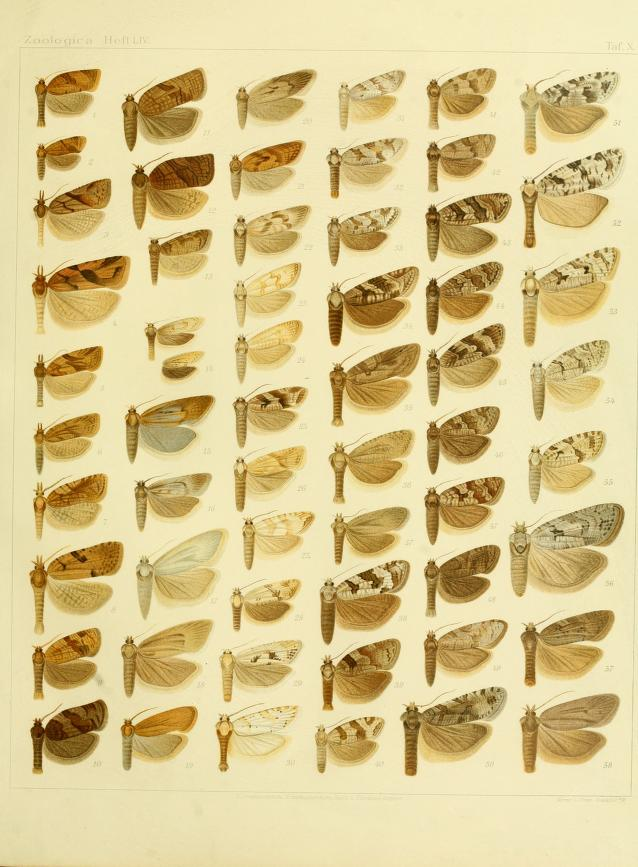
- Clepsis oblimatana in Kennel Die palaearktischen tortriciden figure 13 male

Scientific classification
- Kingdom: Animalia
- Phylum: Arthropoda
- Clade: Pancrustacea
- Class: Insecta
- Order: Lepidoptera
- Family: Tortricidae
- Genus: Clepsis
- Species: C. oblimatana

Binomial name
- Clepsis oblimatana (Kennel, 1901)

Synonyms
- Tortrix oblimatana Kennel, 1901; Cnephasia callimachana Turati, 1924; Tortrix palaestinensis Rebel, 1911

= Clepsis oblimatana =

Species of moth

Clepsis oblimatana is a species of moth of the family Tortricidae. It is found in Libya, Syria, Jordan and Palestine.
