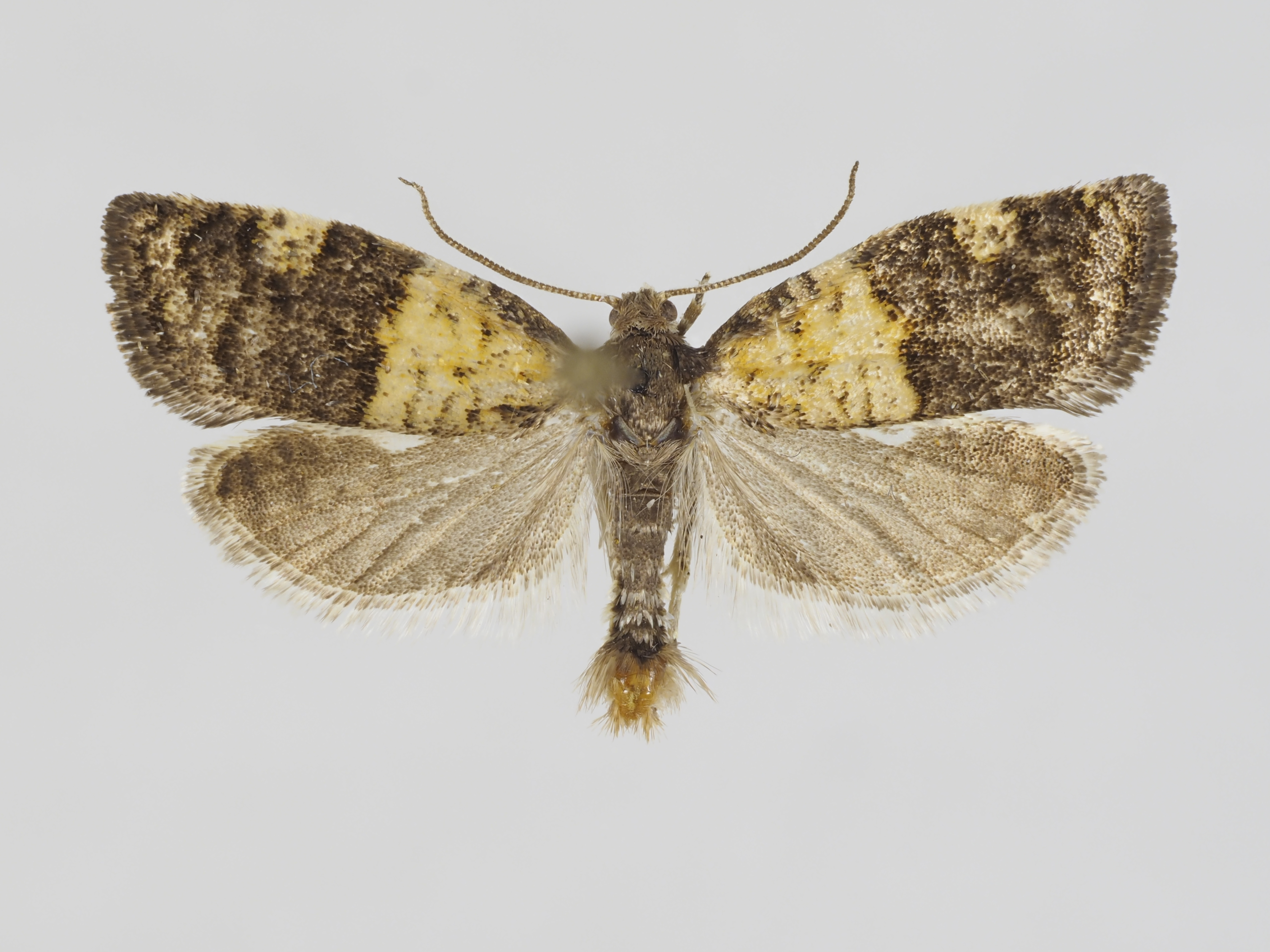

Scientific classification
- Kingdom: Animalia
- Phylum: Arthropoda
- Clade: Pancrustacea
- Class: Insecta
- Order: Lepidoptera
- Family: Tortricidae
- Genus: Clepsis
- Species: C. illustrana

Binomial name
- Clepsis illustrana (Krogerus, 1936)

Synonyms
- Tortrix illustrana Krogerus, 1936

= Clepsis illustrana =

Species of moth

Clepsis illustrana is a species of moth of the family Tortricidae. It is found in Sweden, Finland and the Near East. It has also been recorded from Canada.

The wingspan is 15–20 mm. Adults have been recorded on wing in May and July.
