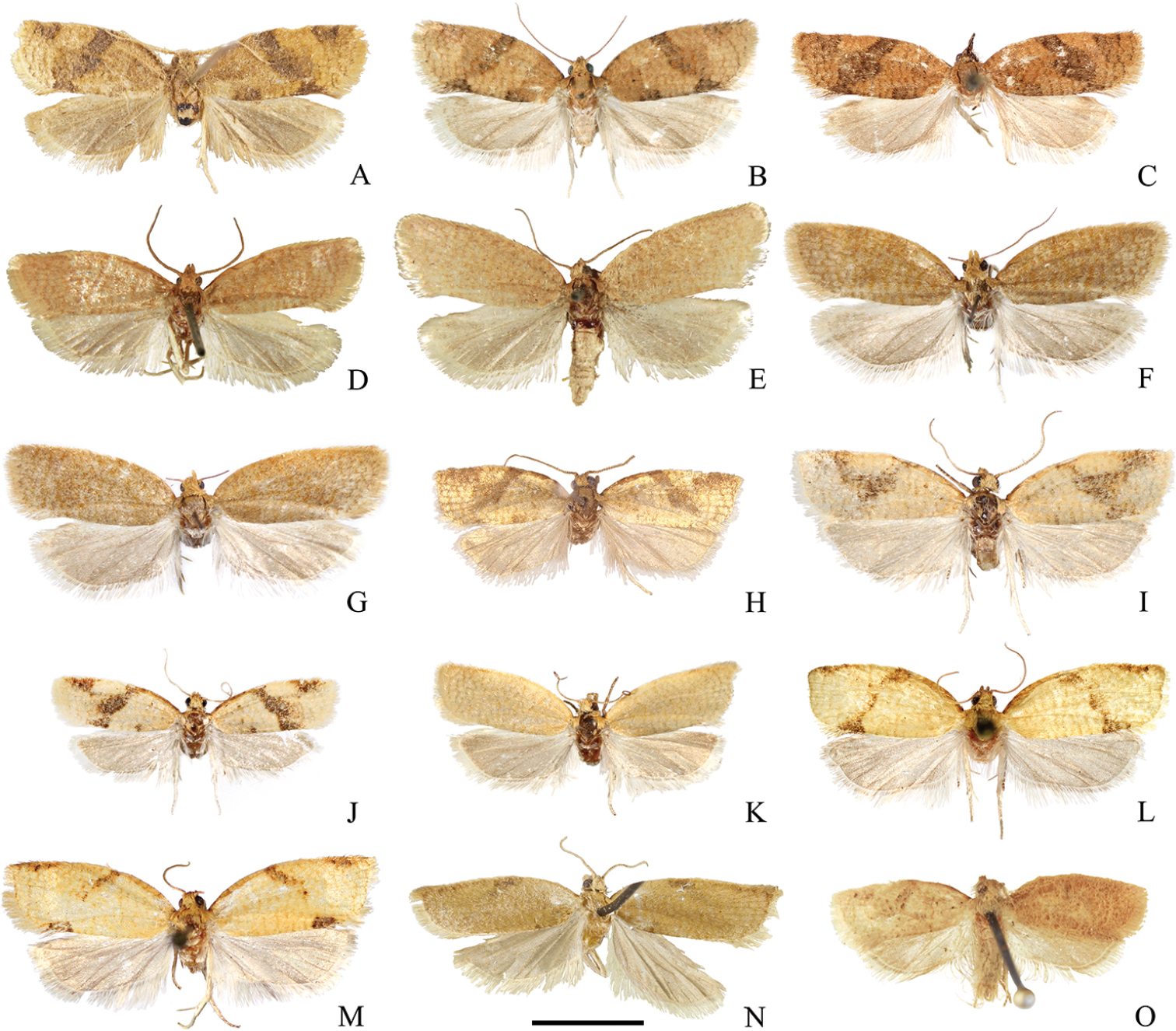

Scientific classification
- Kingdom: Animalia
- Phylum: Arthropoda
- Clade: Pancrustacea
- Class: Insecta
- Order: Lepidoptera
- Family: Tortricidae
- Genus: Clepsis
- Species: C. trivia

Binomial name
- Clepsis trivia (Meyrick, 1913)

Synonyms
- Tortrix trivia Meyrick, 1913

= Clepsis trivia =

Species of moth

Clepsis trivia is a species of moth of the family Tortricidae. It is found in Tunisia.
