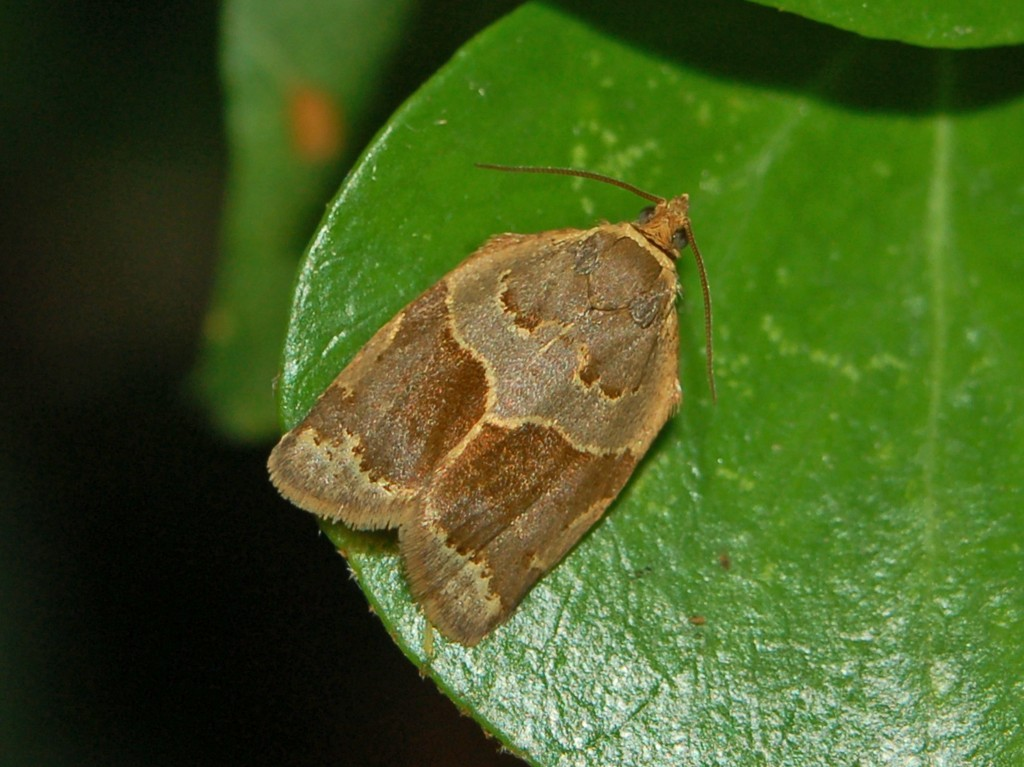

Scientific classification
- Kingdom: Animalia
- Phylum: Arthropoda
- Clade: Pancrustacea
- Class: Insecta
- Order: Lepidoptera
- Family: Tortricidae
- Genus: Clepsis
- Species: C. dumicolana

Binomial name
- Clepsis dumicolana (Zeller, 1847)

Synonyms
- Tortrix dumicolana Zeller, 1847; Cacoecia dumicolana austriaca Amsel, in Hartig & Amsel, 1952

= Clepsis dumicolana =

Species of moth

Clepsis dumicolana is a moth species of the family Tortricidae. It is found in Spain, France, Italy, Belgium, the Netherlands, Germany, Switzerland, Austria, Slovenia, and the Near East.

The wingspan is about 20 mm. The adult moths fly from mid-May until October.

The larvae feed on Hedera helix.

The species was originally endemic to the Mediterranean area and is a neozoon in Central and Western Europe. It is thought to have arrived there with imports of ivy plants from Southern Europe.
