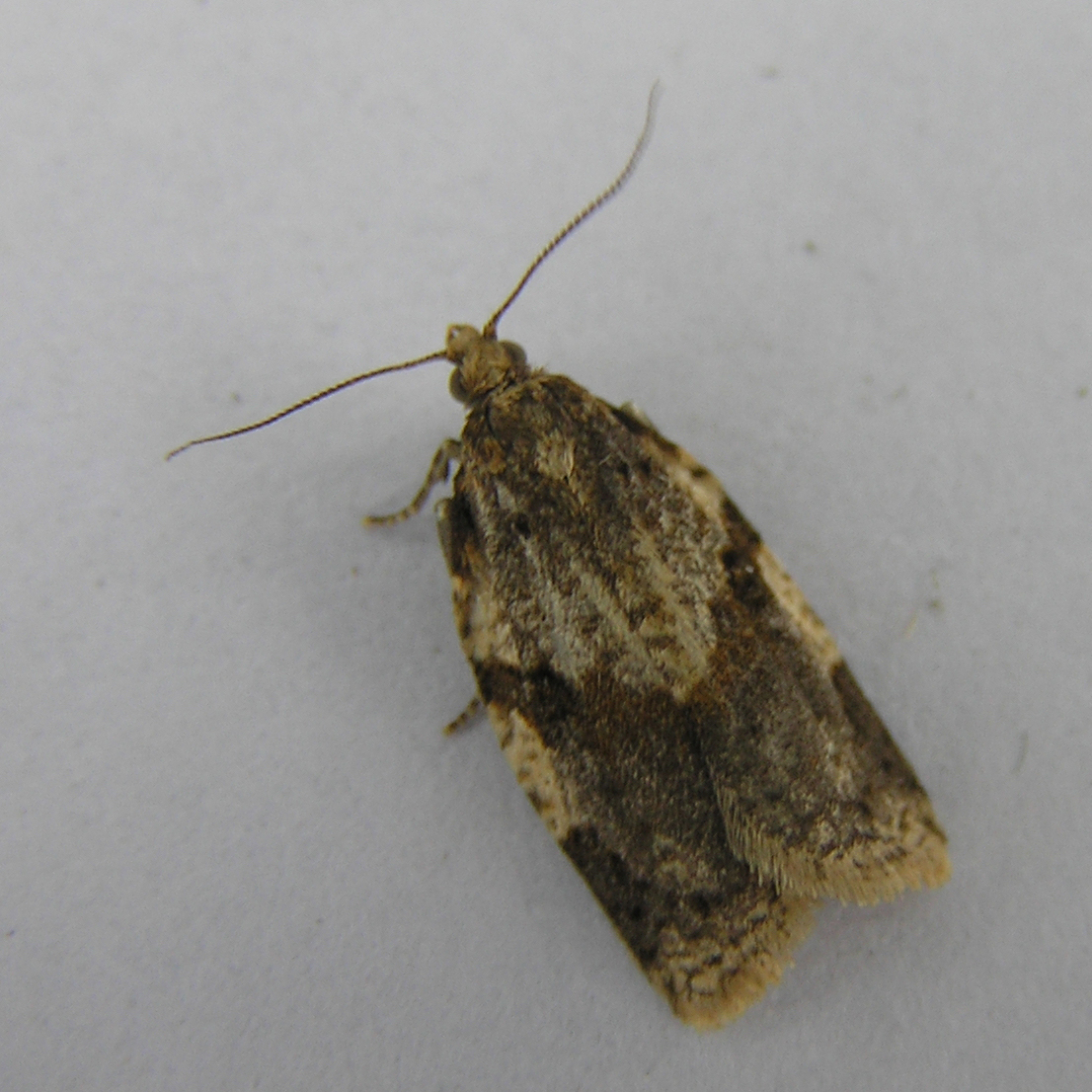
- Clepsis spectrana

Scientific classification
- Kingdom: Animalia
- Phylum: Arthropoda
- Clade: Pancrustacea
- Class: Insecta
- Order: Lepidoptera
- Family: Tortricidae
- Tribe: Archipini
- Genus: Clepsis; Guenée, 1845

Species
- See text

Synonyms
- Clepsodes Diakonoff, 1957; Mochlopyga Diakonoff, 1964; Pseudamelia Obraztsov, 1954; Siclobola Diakonoff, 1948; Smicrotes Clemens, 1860

= Clepsis =

Genus of tortrix moths

Clepsis is a genus of moths belonging to the family Tortricidae. It includes several notable pest species.

== Species ==
- Clepsis aba Razowski, 1979
- Clepsis abscisana (Zeller, 1877)
- Clepsis aerosana (Lederer, 1853)
- Clepsis agenjoi Obraztsov, 1950
- Clepsis aliana Kawabe, 1965
- Clepsis altitudinarius (Filipjev, 1962)
- Clepsis anderslaneyii Dombroskie & J.W. Brown, 2009
- Clepsis archidona Razowski, 1999
- Clepsis assensiodes Razowski, 2004
- Clepsis assensus Razowski & Pelz, 2004
- Clepsis balcanica (Rebel, 1917)
- Clepsis banhadana Razowski & Becker, 2003
- Clepsis bertiogana Razowski & Becker, 2010
- Clepsis biformis (Meyrick, 1920)
- Clepsis brachyptycta (Meyrick, 1938)
- Clepsis browni Razowski & Pelz, 2004
- Clepsis brunneograpta Razowski & Pelz, 2004
- Clepsis brunneotona Razowski & Becker, 2010
- Clepsis brusquea Razowski & Becker, 2003
- Clepsis burgasiensis (Rebel, 1916)
- Clepsis camposana Razowski & Becker, 2003
- Clepsis canariensis (Rebel, in Rebel & Rogenhofer, 1896)
- Clepsis capnosticha (Meyrick, 1917)
- Clepsis carillana Razowski & Becker, 2003
- Clepsis catarinana Razowski & Becker, 2003
- Clepsis celsana (Kennel, 1919)
- Clepsis centonata Razowski & Becker, 1999
- Clepsis chishimana Oku, 1965
- Clepsis chlorodoxa (Meyrick, 1920)
- Clepsis clemensiana (Fernald, 1879)
- Clepsis confragosa Razowski & Becker, 2003
- Clepsis consimilana (Hübner, [1814-1817])
- Clepsis coriacana (Rebel, in Rebel & Rogenhofer, 1894)
- Clepsis cremnobates (Walsingham, 1914)
- Clepsis crinis Razowski, 1979
- Clepsis crispata (Meyrick, 1912)
- Clepsis crispinana (Kennel, 1919)
- Clepsis cristobaliana Razowski & Becker, 2003
- Clepsis danilevskyi Kostyuk, 1973
- Clepsis devexa (Meyrick, 1926)
- Clepsis diversa Razowski & Becker, 2010
- Clepsis domabilis Razowski & Becker, 1999
- Clepsis dubia Razowski & Becker, 2003
- Clepsis dumicolana (Zeller, 1847)
- Clepsis ecclisis (Walsingham, 1914)
- Clepsis enervis Razowski, 1979
- Clepsis enochlodes (Meyrick, 1938)
- Clepsis eura Razowski, 1979
- Clepsis exaraesima Razowski & Becker, 2003
- Clepsis fatiloqua Razowski, 1979
- Clepsis finitima Razowski, 1979
- Clepsis flavidana (McDunnough, 1923)
- Clepsis flavifasciaria Wang Li & Wang, 2003
- Clepsis fluxa Razowski & Becker, 2003
- Clepsis fraterna Razowski & Pelz, 2004
- Clepsis fucana (Walsingham, 1879)
- Clepsis fumosa Razowski & Becker, 2003
- Clepsis gelophodes (Meyrick, 1936)
- Clepsis gemina Razowski, 1979
- Clepsis gerasimovi Danilevsky, 1963
- Clepsis gnathocera Razowski, 2006
- Clepsis griseotona Razowski & Becker, 2010
- Clepsis hissarica Danilevsky, 1963
- Clepsis hohuanshanensis Kawabe, 1985
- Clepsis homophyla (Meyrick, 1917)
- Clepsis humana (Meyrick, 1912)
- Clepsis illustrana (Krogerus, 1936)
- Clepsis ingenua (Meyrick, 1912)
- Clepsis insignata Oku, 1963
- Clepsis joaquimana Razowski & Becker, 1999
- Clepsis jordaoi Razowski & Becker, 2010
- Clepsis kearfotti Obraztsov, 1962
- Clepsis ketmenana (Falkovitsh, in Danilevsky, Kuznetsov & Falkovitsh, 1962)
- Clepsis labisclera Razowski & Becker, 2010
- Clepsis laetitiae Soria, 1997
- Clepsis laetornata Wang Li & Wang, 2003
- Clepsis laxa Razowski, 1979
- Clepsis leptograpta (Meyrick, 1924)
- Clepsis limana Razowski & Becker, 2003
- Clepsis lindebergi (Krogerus, 1952)
- Clepsis lineata Razowski & Pelz, 2004
- Clepsis listerana (Kearfott, 1907)
- Clepsis longilabis Razowski & Becker, 2010
- Clepsis luctuosana (Rebel, 1914)
- Clepsis lutosulana (Zeller, 1877)
- Clepsis maracayana Razowski & Becker, 2003
- Clepsis mehli (Opheim, 1964)
- Clepsis melaleucanus (Walker, 1863)
- Clepsis melissa (Meyrick, 1908)
- Clepsis metalleta (Walsingham, 1914)
- Clepsis microceria Razowski & Wojtusiak, 2010
- Clepsis microchone Razowski & Becker, 2003
- Clepsis micromys (Stringer, 1929)
- Clepsis miserulana (Zeller, 1877)
- Clepsis misgurna Razowski, 1992
- Clepsis moeschleriana (Wocke, 1862)
- Clepsis monochroa Razowski, 2006
- Clepsis monticolana Kawabe, 1964
- Clepsis murzini Gibeaux, 1999
- Clepsis naucinum Razowski, 1992
- Clepsis neglectana (Herrich-Schäffer, 1851)
- Clepsis neomelissa (Rose & Pooni, 2004)
- Clepsis nevadae Razowski & Wojtusiak, 2006
- Clepsis nybomi Hackman, 1950
- Clepsis oblimatana (Kennel, 1901)
- Clepsis octogona (Bradley, 1965)
- Clepsis opinabilis Razowski, 1979
- Clepsis orycta (Walsingham, 1914)
- Clepsis pallidana (Fabricius, 1776)
- Clepsis paralaxa Razowski & Becker, 2010
- Clepsis parassensus Razowski, 2004
- Clepsis parorycta Razowski & Becker, 2003
- Clepsis parva Razowski, 2004
- Clepsis peguncus Razowski & Wojtusiak, 2013
- Clepsis pelospila (Meyrick, 1932)
- Clepsis penetralis Razowski, 1979
- Clepsis peritana (Clemens, 1860)
- Clepsis persicana (Fitch, 1856)
- Clepsis phaeana (Rebel, 1916)
- Clepsis pinaria Razowski & Becker, 2010
- Clepsis plumbeolana (Bremer, 1865)
- Clepsis poliochra (Meyrick, 1920)
- Clepsis powelli Razowski, 1979
- Clepsis praeclarana (Kennel, 1899)
- Clepsis provocata (Meyrick, 1912)
- Clepsis rasilis Razowski, 1979
- Clepsis razowskii Kawabe, 1992
- Clepsis retiferana (Stainton, 1859)
- Clepsis rogana (Guenée, 1845)
- Clepsis rolandriana (Linnaeus, 1758)
- Clepsis rurinana (Linnaeus, 1758)
- Clepsis sarthana (Ragonot, 1894)
- Clepsis scaeodoxa (Meyrick, 1935)
- Clepsis semanta Razowski & Becker, 2003
- Clepsis senecionana (Hübner, [1818-1819])
- Clepsis siciliana (Ragonot, 1894)
- Clepsis smicrotes (Walsingham, 1914)
- Clepsis soriana (Kennel, 1899)
- Clepsis spectrana (Treitschke, 1830)
- Clepsis spirana Razowski, 1979
- Clepsis staintoni Obraztsov, 1955
- Clepsis steineriana (Hübner, [1796-1799])
- Clepsis stenophora (Bradley, 1965)
- Clepsis subcostana (Stainton, 1859)
- Clepsis subjunctana (Wollaston, 1858)
- Clepsis taima Razowski & Becker, 2003
- Clepsis tannuolana Kostyuk, 1973
- Clepsis tassa Razowski & Pelz, 2004
- Clepsis teopiscae Razowski & Becker, 2003
- Clepsis terevalva Razowski & Wojtusiak, 2008
- Clepsis tetraplegma (Diakonoff, 1957)
- Clepsis translucida (Meyrick, 1908)
- Clepsis trifasciata Trematerra, 2010
- Clepsis trileucana (Doubleday, 1847)
- Clepsis trivia (Meyrick, 1913)
- Clepsis truculenta Razowski, 1979
- Clepsis tuxtlana Razowski & Becker, 2003
- Clepsis uncisecta Razowski & Wolff, in Razowski, 1998
- Clepsis unicolorana (Duponchel, in Godart, 1835)
- Clepsis violacea Razowski, 1966
- Clepsis virescana (Clemens, 1865)
- Clepsis vitiana (Zeller, 1877)
- Clepsis zelleriana (Erschoff, 1874)
- Clepsis zeuglodon Razowski, 1979
- Clepsis zoquipana Razowski & Becker, 2003

== Status unclear ==
- Clepsis antigona (Meyrick, 1931), described as Tortrix antigona from Bulgaria.
- Clepsis substrigana (Constantini, 1923), described as Tortrix substrigana from Italy.
