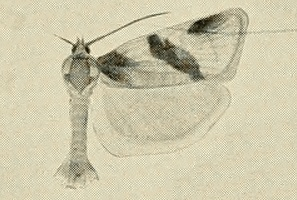

Scientific classification
- Kingdom: Animalia
- Phylum: Arthropoda
- Clade: Pancrustacea
- Class: Insecta
- Order: Lepidoptera
- Family: Tortricidae
- Genus: Clepsis
- Species: C. praeclarana

Binomial name
- Clepsis praeclarana (Kennel, 1899)

Synonyms
- Tortrix (Heterognomon) praeclarana Kennel, 1899; Tortrix fucosana Kennel, 1901; Clepsis vittata Obraztsov, 1968

= Clepsis praeclarana =

Species of moth

Clepsis praeclarana is a species of moth of the family Tortricidae. It is found in Russia (Siberia, Volgograd Oblast), Kazakhstan, Georgia, Kyrgyzstan and Mongolia.

The wingspan is 18–23 mm. Adults have been recorded on wing from June to July.

The larvae feed on Caragana arborescens, Caragana frutex, Caragana bungei and Caragana microphylla.
