= Clepsis ecclisis =

Scientific classification
- Kingdom: Animalia
- Phylum: Arthropoda
- Clade: Pancrustacea
- Class: Insecta
- Order: Lepidoptera
- Family: Tortricidae
- Genus: Clepsis
- Species: C. ecclisis

Binomial name
- Clepsis ecclisis (Walsingham, 1914)

Synonyms
- Tortrix ecclisis Walsingham, 1914

Species of moth

Clepsis ecclisis is a species of moth of the family Tortricidae. It is found in Guatemala and Panama.

The wingspan is about 19 mm. The forewings are fawn to fawn-grey with fawn-brown transverse lines. The hindwings are whitish-grey.
