= Clepsis phaeana =

Scientific classification
- Kingdom: Animalia
- Phylum: Arthropoda
- Clade: Pancrustacea
- Class: Insecta
- Order: Lepidoptera
- Family: Tortricidae
- Genus: Clepsis
- Species: C. phaeana

Binomial name
- Clepsis phaeana (Rebel, 1916)

Synonyms
- Tortrix phaeana Rebel, 1916

Species of moth

Clepsis phaeana is a species of moth of the family Tortricidae. It is found in Siberia.
