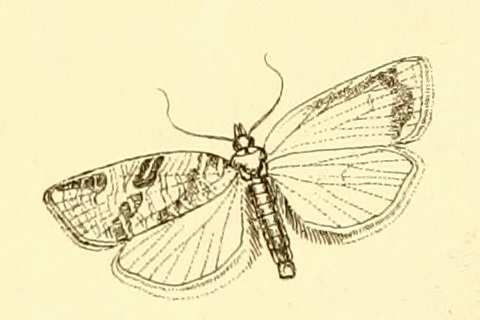

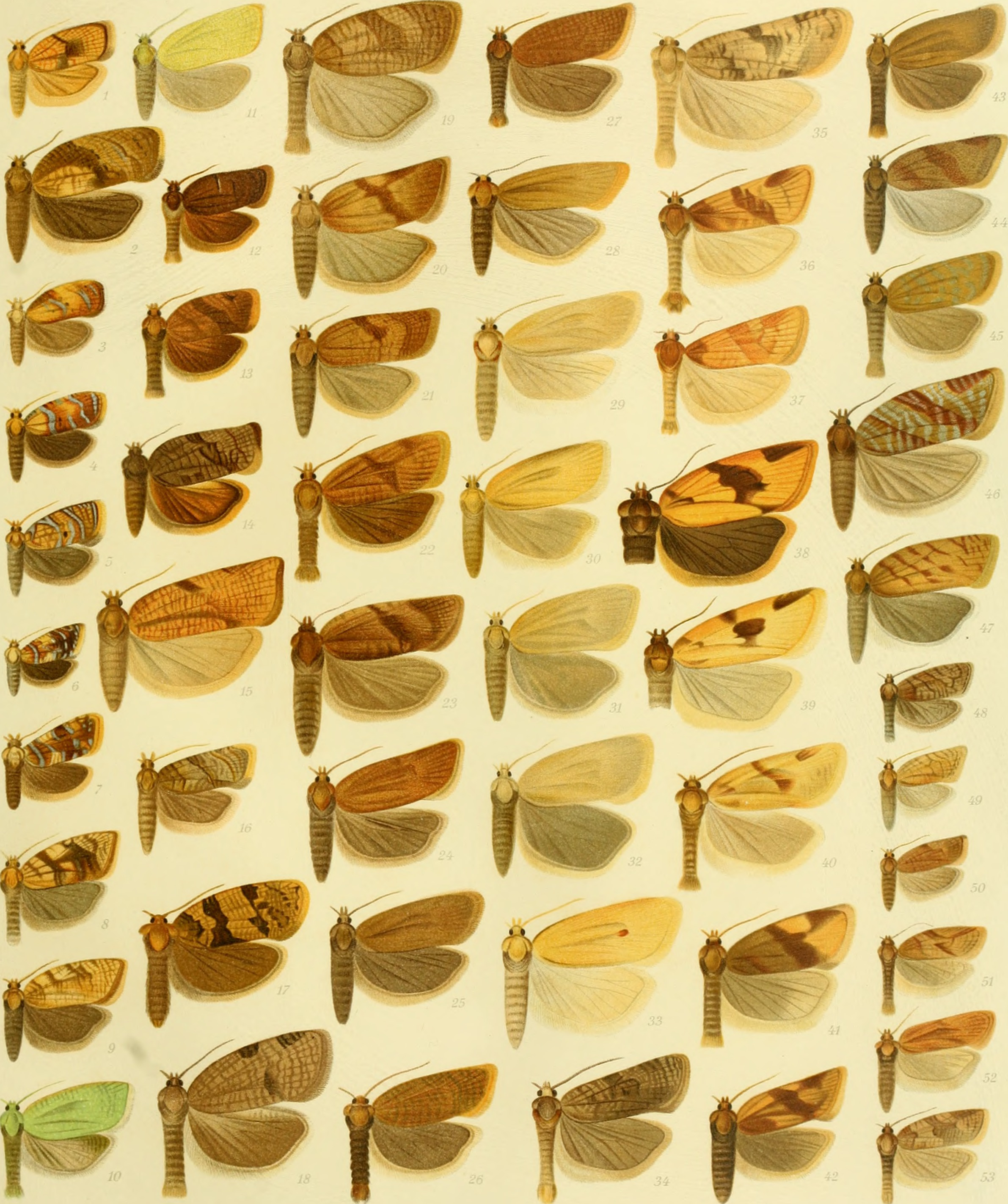
- Clepsis aerosana in Kennel Die palaearktischen tortriciden figure 46 female

Scientific classification
- Kingdom: Animalia
- Phylum: Arthropoda
- Clade: Pancrustacea
- Class: Insecta
- Order: Lepidoptera
- Family: Tortricidae
- Genus: Clepsis
- Species: C. aerosana

Binomial name
- Clepsis aerosana (Lederer, 1853)

Synonyms
- Tortrix aerosana Lederer, 1853

= Clepsis aerosana =

Species of moth

Clepsis aerosana is a species of moth of the family Tortricidae. It is found in China (Xinjiang), Mongolia and Russia.

The wingspan is 22–27 mm. Adults have been recorded on wing from June to July.
