= Clepsis altitudinarius =

Scientific classification
- Kingdom: Animalia
- Phylum: Arthropoda
- Clade: Pancrustacea
- Class: Insecta
- Order: Lepidoptera
- Family: Tortricidae
- Genus: Clepsis
- Species: C. altitudinarius

Binomial name
- Clepsis altitudinarius (Filipjev, 1962)

Synonyms
- Tortrix altitudinarius Filipjev, 1962; Clepsis altudinaria Razowski, 1979

Species of moth

Clepsis altitudinarius is a species of moth of the family Tortricidae. It was described by Filipjev in 1962 and is found in Russia (the Caucasus). The habitat consists of alpine meadows.

The wingspan is 18.5-20.5 mm for males and 14–16 mm for females.
