= Clepsis parassensus =

Scientific classification
- Kingdom: Animalia
- Phylum: Arthropoda
- Clade: Pancrustacea
- Class: Insecta
- Order: Lepidoptera
- Family: Tortricidae
- Genus: Clepsis
- Species: C. parassensus

Binomial name
- Clepsis parassensus Razowski, 2004

Species of moth

Clepsis parassensus is a species of moth of the family Tortricidae. It is found in Ecuador (Pichincha-Septimo Paraiso Reserve).

The wingspan is about 11 mm for males and about 15 mm for females.
