= Clepsis paralaxa =

Scientific classification
- Kingdom: Animalia
- Phylum: Arthropoda
- Clade: Pancrustacea
- Class: Insecta
- Order: Lepidoptera
- Family: Tortricidae
- Genus: Clepsis
- Species: C. paralaxa

Binomial name
- Clepsis paralaxa Razowski & Becker, 2010

Species of moth

Clepsis paralaxa is a species of moth of the family Tortricidae. It is found in the Federal District of Mexico.

The wingspan is about 17 mm.
