= Clepsis trifasciata =

Scientific classification
- Kingdom: Animalia
- Phylum: Arthropoda
- Clade: Pancrustacea
- Class: Insecta
- Order: Lepidoptera
- Family: Tortricidae
- Genus: Clepsis
- Species: C. trifasciata

Binomial name
- Clepsis trifasciata Trematerra, 2010

Species of moth

Clepsis trifasciata is a species of moth of the family Tortricidae. It is found in Kyrgyzstan, where it was recorded at an altitude of 1,800 meters.

The wingspan is 18–19 mm.
