= Clepsis kearfotti =

Scientific classification
- Kingdom: Animalia
- Phylum: Arthropoda
- Clade: Pancrustacea
- Class: Insecta
- Order: Lepidoptera
- Family: Tortricidae
- Genus: Clepsis
- Species: C. kearfotti

Binomial name
- Clepsis kearfotti Obraztsov, 1962

Species of moth

Clepsis kearfotti is a species of moth of the family Tortricidae. It is found in North America, where it has been recorded from Alaska and Alberta.

== Etymology ==
The species is named in honour of William Dunham Kearfott.
