= Clepsis vitiana =

Scientific classification
- Kingdom: Animalia
- Phylum: Arthropoda
- Clade: Pancrustacea
- Class: Insecta
- Order: Lepidoptera
- Family: Tortricidae
- Genus: Clepsis
- Species: C. vitiana

Binomial name
- Clepsis vitiana (Zeller, 1877)

Synonyms
- Loxotaenia vitiana Zeller, 1877

Species of moth

Clepsis vitiana is a species of moth of the family Tortricidae. It is found in Colombia.
