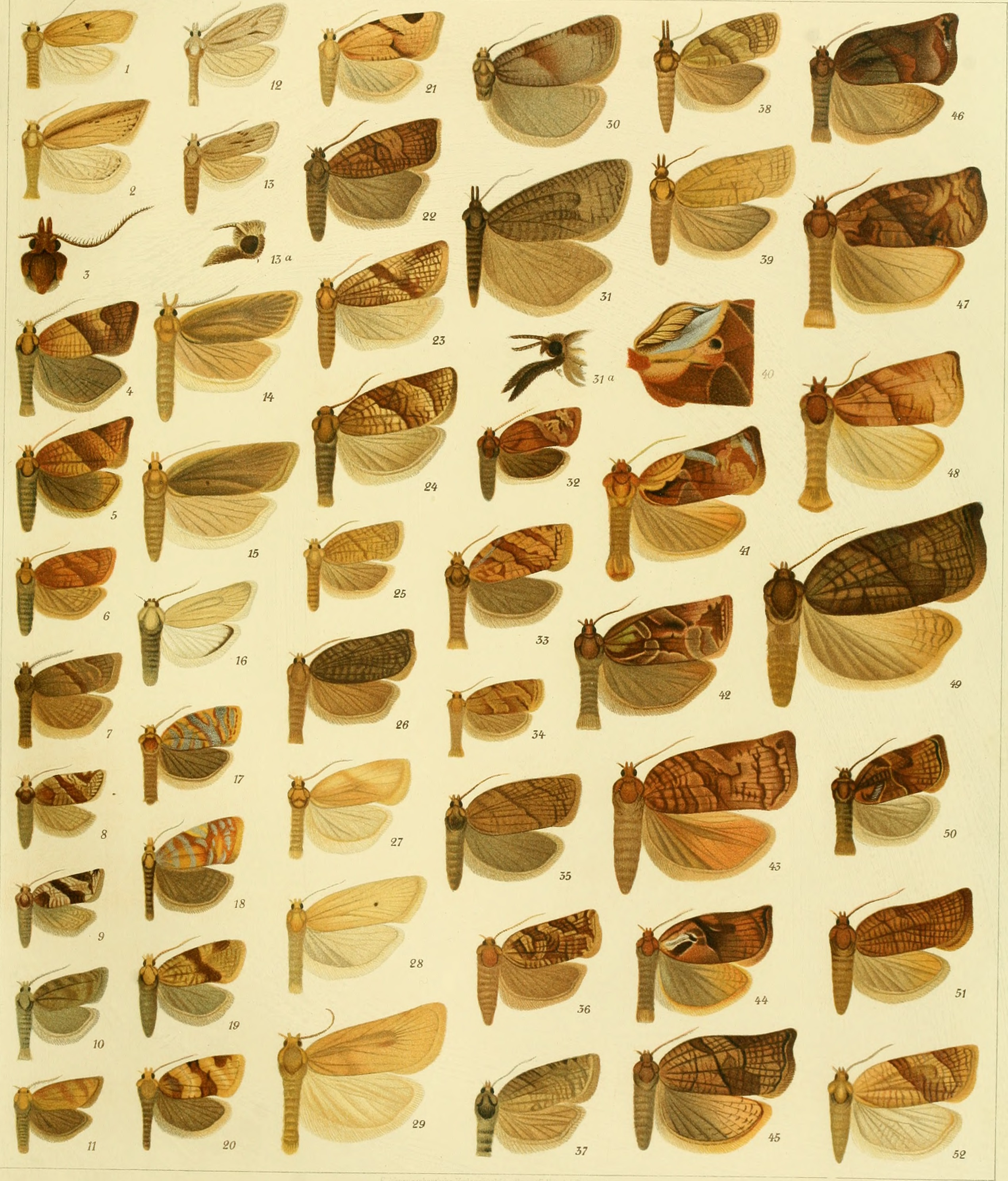
- Epagoge moeschleriana in Julius von Kennel's Die palaearktischen tortriciden figure 23 male

Scientific classification
- Kingdom: Animalia
- Phylum: Arthropoda
- Clade: Pancrustacea
- Class: Insecta
- Order: Lepidoptera
- Family: Tortricidae
- Genus: Clepsis
- Species: C. moeschleriana

Binomial name
- Clepsis moeschleriana (Wocke, 1862)

Synonyms
- Tortrix moeschleriana Wocke, 1862; Tortrix algidana Moschler, 1862; Clepsis altaiensis Kostyuk, 1975; Tortrix gelidana Moschler, 1862

= Clepsis moeschleriana =

Species of moth

Clepsis moeschleriana is a species of moth of the family Tortricidae first described by Maximilian Ferdinand Wocke in 1862. It is found in Kyrgyzstan, Russia and North America, where it has been recorded from Alaska to Newfoundland, south in the mountains to New Hampshire, Colorado and Utah. The habitat consists of alpine and subalpine areas.

The wingspan is 15–23 mm. Adults have been recorded on wing from May to June in Russia and from June to August in North America.

The larvae feed on Delphinium barbeyi.
