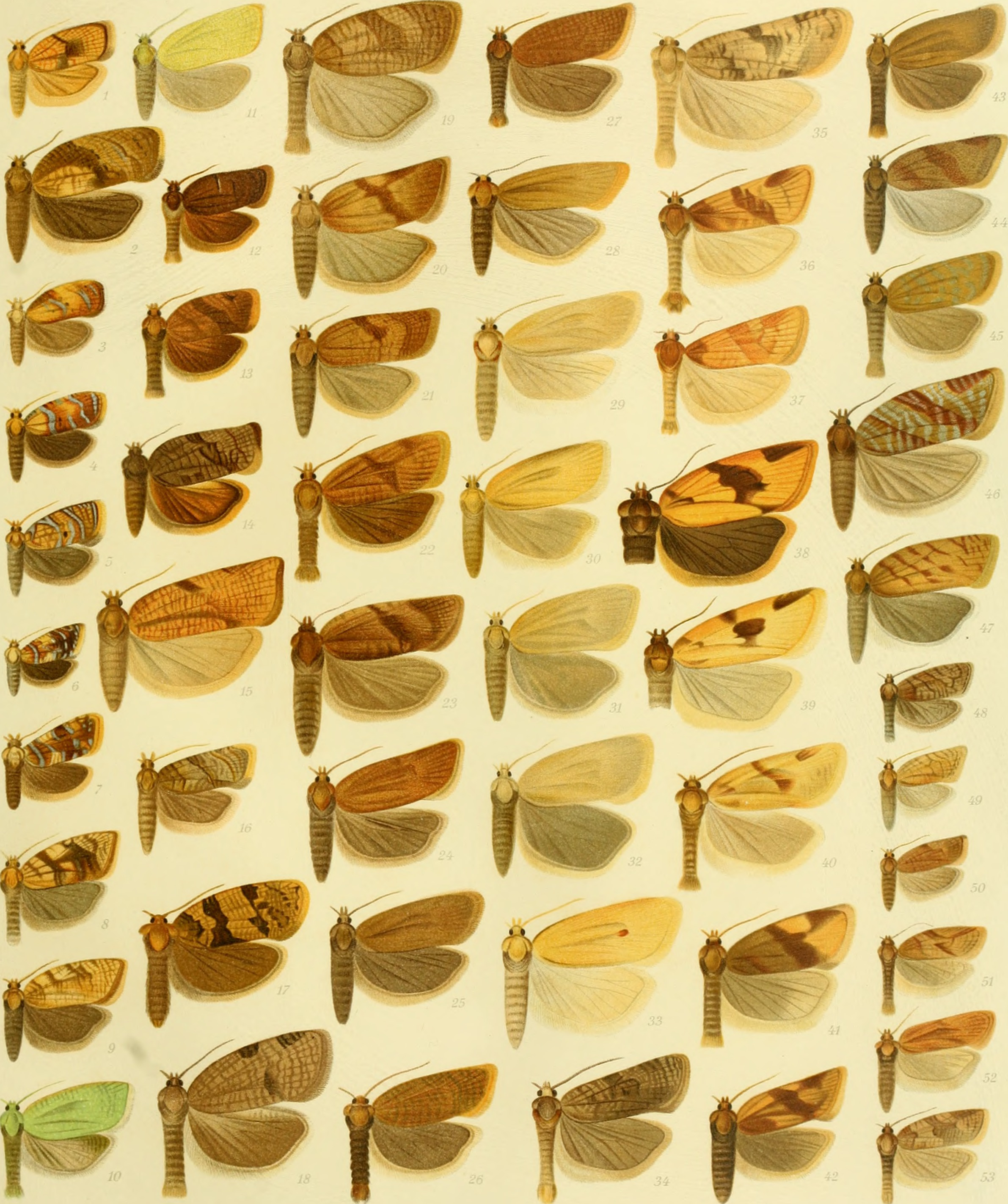
- Clepsis soriana in Kennel Die palaearktischen tortriciden figure 53 male

Scientific classification
- Kingdom: Animalia
- Phylum: Arthropoda
- Clade: Pancrustacea
- Class: Insecta
- Order: Lepidoptera
- Family: Tortricidae
- Genus: Clepsis
- Species: C. soriana

Binomial name
- Clepsis soriana (Kennel, 1899)

Synonyms
- Tortrix soriana Kennel, 1899; Tortrix seclusa Meyrick, 1926

= Clepsis soriana =

Species of moth

Clepsis soriana is a species of moth of the family Tortricidae. It is found in Lebanon and Palestine.
