= Clepsis danilevskyi =

Scientific classification
- Kingdom: Animalia
- Phylum: Arthropoda
- Clade: Pancrustacea
- Class: Insecta
- Order: Lepidoptera
- Family: Tortricidae
- Genus: Clepsis
- Species: C. danilevskyi

Binomial name
- Clepsis danilevskyi Kostyuk, 1973

Synonyms
- Clepsis (Siclobola) firthana Mutuura, 1980

Species of moth

Clepsis danilevskyi is a species of moth of the family Tortricidae. It is found in Russia (northern European Russia, Mongun-Taiga in Siberia) and Alaska.

The wingspan is 18–23 mm. Adults have been recorded on wing in July.

== Etymology ==
The species is named in honour of Professor Alexsandr Sergeevich Danilevskii.
