= Clepsis mehli =

Scientific classification
- Kingdom: Animalia
- Phylum: Arthropoda
- Clade: Pancrustacea
- Class: Insecta
- Order: Lepidoptera
- Family: Tortricidae
- Genus: Clepsis
- Species: C. mehli

Binomial name
- Clepsis mehli (Opheim, 1964)

Synonyms
- Epagoge mehli Opheim, 1964

Species of moth

Clepsis mehli is a moth of the family Tortricidae. It was described by Opheim in 1964. It is found along the coast of northern Norway and in Russia. The habitat consists of grassy meadows.

The wingspan is 15–17 mm.
