= Clepsis aba =

Scientific classification
- Kingdom: Animalia
- Phylum: Arthropoda
- Clade: Pancrustacea
- Class: Insecta
- Order: Lepidoptera
- Family: Tortricidae
- Genus: Clepsis
- Species: C. aba

Binomial name
- Clepsis aba Razowski, 1979

Species of moth

Clepsis aba is a species of moth of the family Tortricidae. It was first described by Józef Razowski in 1979. It is found in Shaanxi, China.

The length of the forewings is 11–12 mm.
