= Clepsis centonata =

Scientific classification
- Kingdom: Animalia
- Phylum: Arthropoda
- Clade: Pancrustacea
- Class: Insecta
- Order: Lepidoptera
- Family: Tortricidae
- Genus: Clepsis
- Species: C. centonata

Binomial name
- Clepsis centonata Razowski & Becker, 1999

Species of moth

Clepsis centonata is a species of moth of the family Tortricidae. It is found in Paraná, Brazil.
