= Clepsis pelospila =

Scientific classification
- Kingdom: Animalia
- Phylum: Arthropoda
- Clade: Pancrustacea
- Class: Insecta
- Order: Lepidoptera
- Family: Tortricidae
- Genus: Clepsis
- Species: C. pelospila

Binomial name
- Clepsis pelospila (Meyrick, 1932)

Synonyms
- Tortrix pelospila Meyrick, 1932

Species of moth

Clepsis pelospila is a species of moth of the family Tortricidae. It is found in the Federal District of Mexico.
