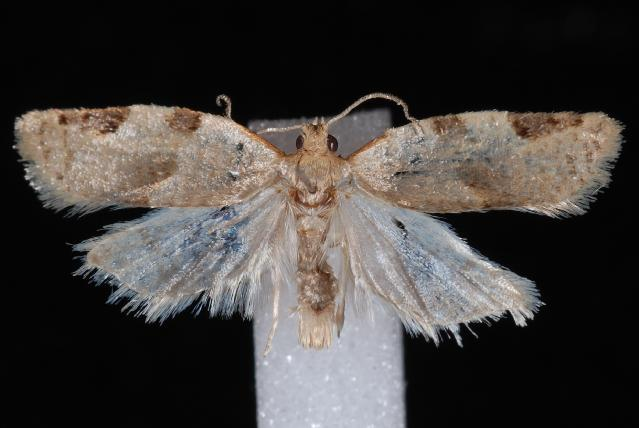

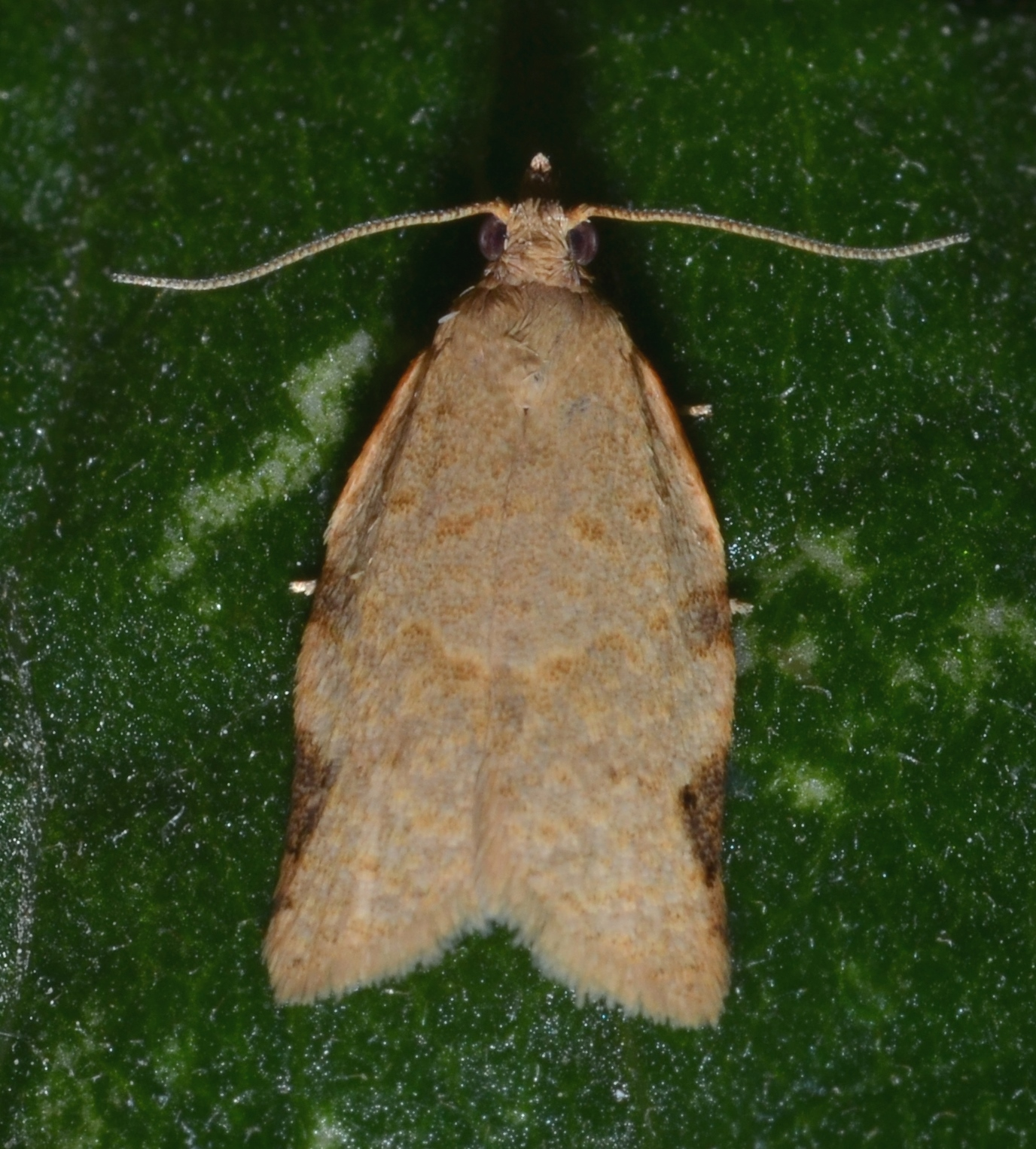

Scientific classification
- Kingdom: Animalia
- Phylum: Arthropoda
- Clade: Pancrustacea
- Class: Insecta
- Order: Lepidoptera
- Family: Tortricidae
- Genus: Clepsis
- Species: C. virescana

Binomial name
- Clepsis virescana (Clemens, 1865)

Synonyms
- Smicrotes virescana Clemens, 1865; Lozotaenia glaucana Walsingham, 1879; Clepsis virescana salebrosa Razowski, 1979; Tortrix sescuplana Zeller, 1875

= Clepsis virescana =

Species of moth

Clepsis virescana, the light brown apple moth, is a species of moth of the family Tortricidae. It is found in North America, where it is widespread in southern Canada and most of the United States. The habitat consists of shrubby open areas and aspen parkland.

The length of the forewings is 6.4–9.1 mm. Adults have been recorded on wing from April to September.

The larvae have been recorded feeding on both fresh and decaying leaves of Prunus and Rosa species.
