= Clepsis chishimana =

Scientific classification
- Kingdom: Animalia
- Phylum: Arthropoda
- Clade: Pancrustacea
- Class: Insecta
- Order: Lepidoptera
- Family: Tortricidae
- Genus: Clepsis
- Species: C. chishimana

Binomial name
- Clepsis chishimana Oku, 1965

Synonyms
- Clepsis jinboi Kawabe, 1965

Species of moth

Clepsis chishimana is a species of moth of the family Tortricidae. It is found in Russia (the Kuril Islands) and Japan (Honshu).

The wingspan is 18–23 mm.
