= Clepsis cremnobates =

Scientific classification
- Kingdom: Animalia
- Phylum: Arthropoda
- Clade: Pancrustacea
- Class: Insecta
- Order: Lepidoptera
- Family: Tortricidae
- Genus: Clepsis
- Species: C. cremnobates

Binomial name
- Clepsis cremnobates (Walsingham, 1914)

Synonyms
- Tortrix cremnobates Walsingham, 1914

Species of moth

Clepsis cremnobates is a species of moth of the family Tortricidae. It is found in Guatemala.

The wingspan is about 26 mm. The forewings are brownish cinereous (ash grey), suffused with ashy grey and with slender transverse brownish lines. The hindwings are silvery grey.
