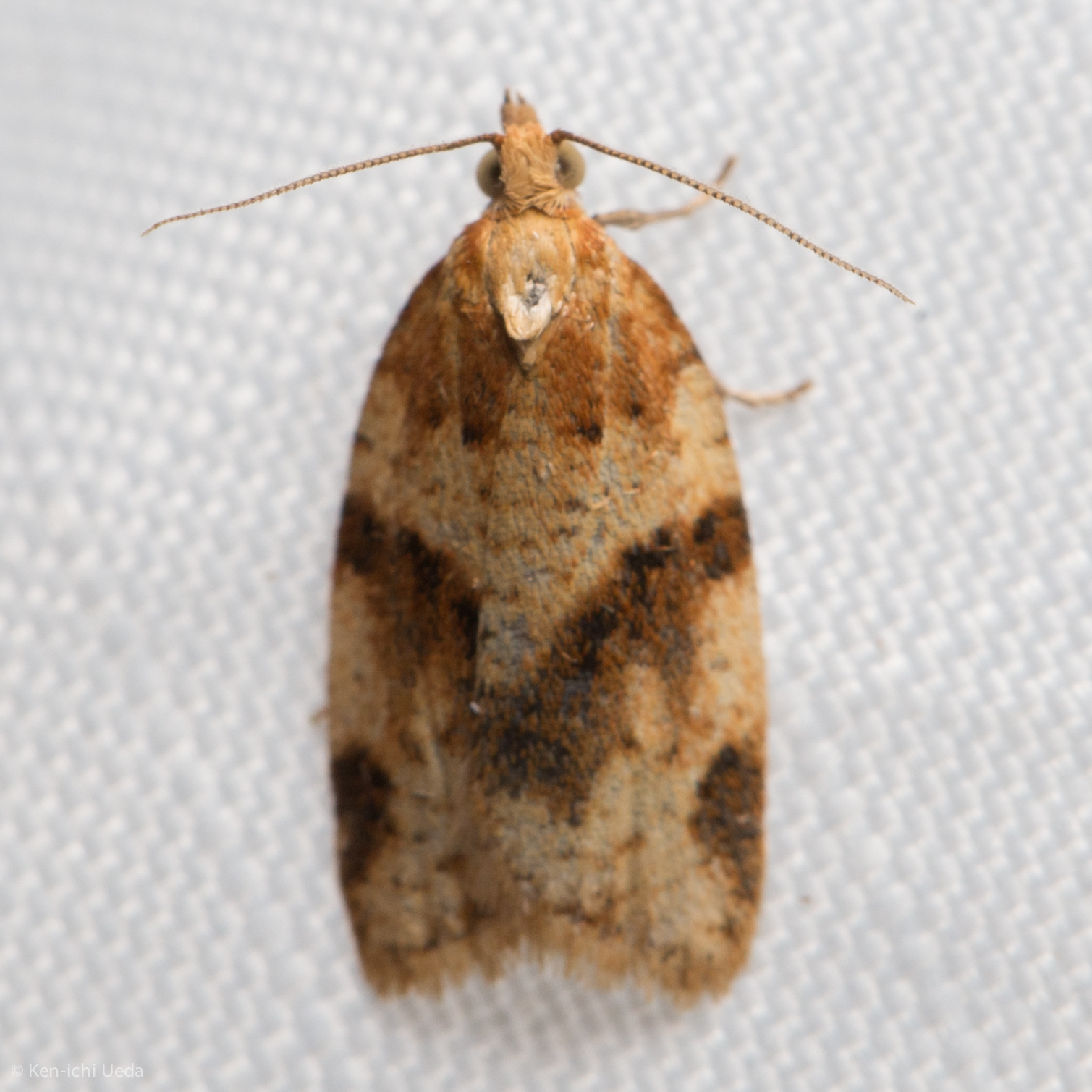

Scientific classification
- Kingdom: Animalia
- Phylum: Arthropoda
- Clade: Pancrustacea
- Class: Insecta
- Order: Lepidoptera
- Family: Tortricidae
- Genus: Clepsis
- Species: C. fucana

Binomial name
- Clepsis fucana (Walsingham, 1879)

Synonyms
- Lozotaenia fucana Walsingham, 1879; Clepsis busckana Keifer, 1933; Cacoecia victoriana Busck, 1922

= Clepsis fucana =

Species of moth

Clepsis fucana is a species of moth of the family Tortricidae. It is found in North America, where it has been recorded from British Columbia south to California.

The length of the forewings is 6.4–10.6 mm.
