= Clepsis sarthana =

Scientific classification
- Kingdom: Animalia
- Phylum: Arthropoda
- Clade: Pancrustacea
- Class: Insecta
- Order: Lepidoptera
- Family: Tortricidae
- Genus: Clepsis
- Species: C. sarthana

Binomial name
- Clepsis sarthana (Ragonot, 1894)

Synonyms
- Tortrix sarthana Ragonot, 1894

Species of moth

Clepsis sarthana is a species of moth of the family Tortricidae. It is found in Central Asia, including Tajikistan, Kazakhstan, Kyrgyzstan and Uzbekistan.

The wingspan is 21–22 mm for males and about 24 mm for females.

The larvae feed on Acer species.
