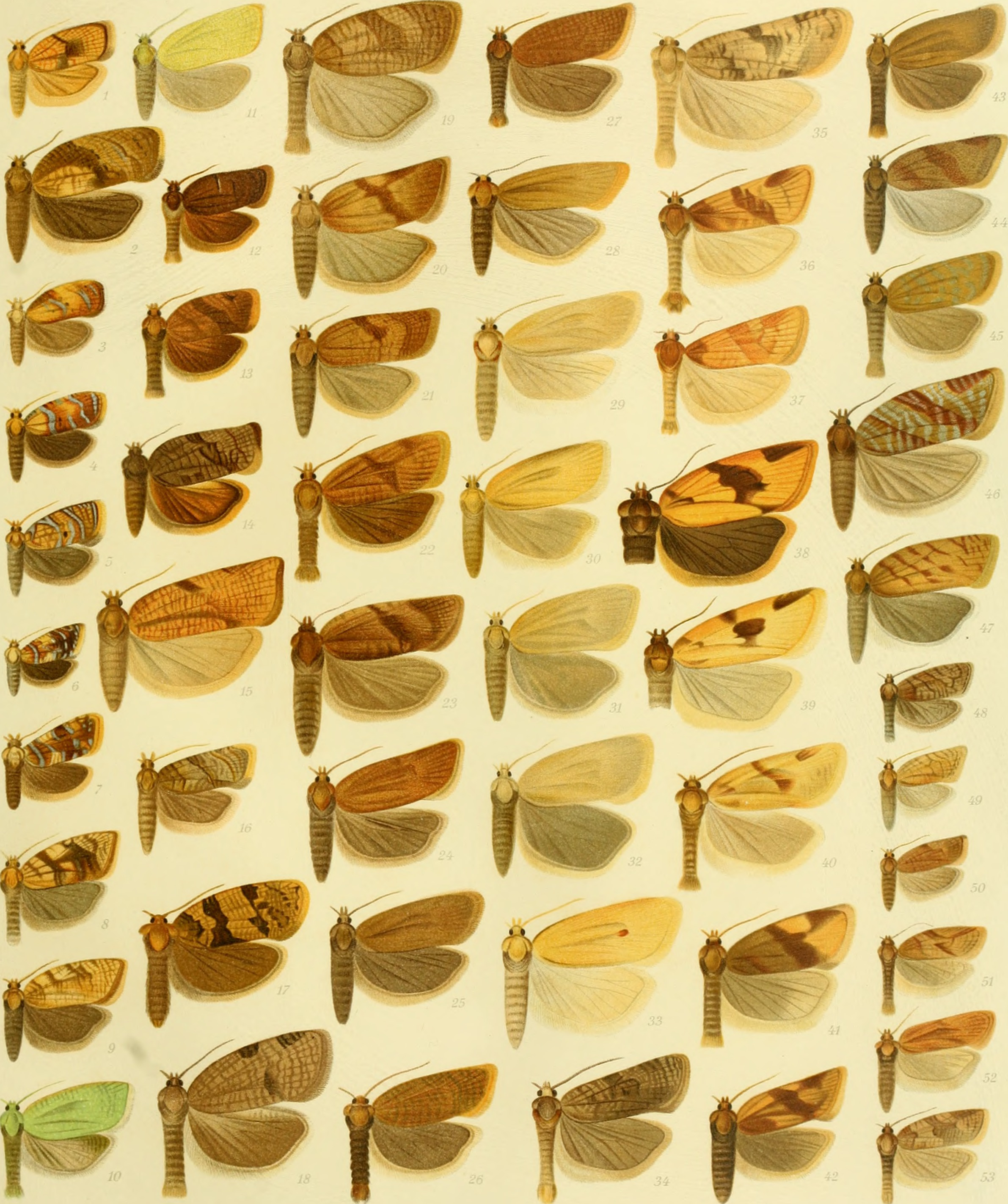
- Clepsis coriacana in Kennel Die palaearktischen tortriciden figure 52 female

Scientific classification
- Kingdom: Animalia
- Phylum: Arthropoda
- Clade: Pancrustacea
- Class: Insecta
- Order: Lepidoptera
- Family: Tortricidae
- Genus: Clepsis
- Species: C. coriacana

Binomial name
- Clepsis coriacana (Rebel, in Rebel & Rogenhofer, 1894)

Synonyms
- Heterognomon coriacana Rebel, in Rebel & Rogenhofer, 1894; Clepsis coriacanus

= Clepsis coriacana =

Species of moth

Clepsis coriacana is a species of moth of the family Tortricidae. It is found on the Canary Islands, Spain, Portugal, France, and the Balearic Islands.

The wingspan is 13–16 mm. The ground colour of the forewings is pale leathery yellow with weak traces of brownish markings. The hindwings are light grey.
