= Clepsis nevadae =

Scientific classification
- Kingdom: Animalia
- Phylum: Arthropoda
- Clade: Pancrustacea
- Class: Insecta
- Order: Lepidoptera
- Family: Tortricidae
- Genus: Clepsis
- Species: C. nevadae

Binomial name
- Clepsis nevadae Razowski & Wojtusiak, 2006

Species of moth

Clepsis nevadae is a species of moth of the family Tortricidae. It is found in Venezuela.

The wingspan is 15–17 millimetres (0.59–0.67 in).
