= Clepsis leptograpta =

Scientific classification
- Kingdom: Animalia
- Phylum: Arthropoda
- Clade: Pancrustacea
- Class: Insecta
- Order: Lepidoptera
- Family: Tortricidae
- Genus: Clepsis
- Species: C. leptograpta

Binomial name
- Clepsis leptograpta (Meyrick, 1924)

Synonyms
- Tortrix leptograpta Meyrick, 1924

Species of moth

Clepsis leptograpta is a species of moth of the family Tortricidae. It is found in Kashmir.
