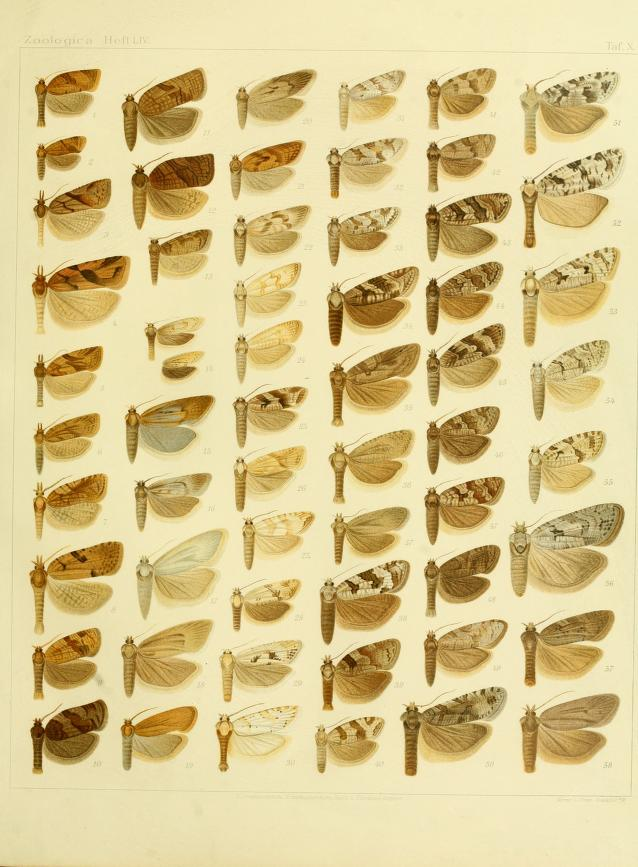
- Clepsis canariensis in Kennel Die palaearktischen tortriciden figure 5 male, figure 6 female

Scientific classification
- Kingdom: Animalia
- Phylum: Arthropoda
- Clade: Pancrustacea
- Class: Insecta
- Order: Lepidoptera
- Family: Tortricidae
- Genus: Clepsis
- Species: C. canariensis

Binomial name
- Clepsis canariensis (Rebel, in Rebel & Rogenhofer, 1896)

Synonyms
- Tortrix subcostana var. canariensis Rebel, in Rebel & Rogenhofer, 1896

= Clepsis canariensis =

Species of moth

Clepsis canariensis is a species of moth of the family Tortricidae. It is found on the Canary Islands.
