= Clepsis translucida =

Scientific classification
- Kingdom: Animalia
- Phylum: Arthropoda
- Clade: Pancrustacea
- Class: Insecta
- Order: Lepidoptera
- Family: Tortricidae
- Genus: Clepsis
- Species: C. translucida

Binomial name
- Clepsis translucida (Meyrick, 1908)

Synonyms
- Cacoecia translucida Meyrick, 1908

Species of moth

Clepsis translucida is a species of moth of the family Tortricidae. It is found in Kashmir.
