= Clepsis tannuolana =

Scientific classification
- Kingdom: Animalia
- Phylum: Arthropoda
- Clade: Pancrustacea
- Class: Insecta
- Order: Lepidoptera
- Family: Tortricidae
- Genus: Clepsis
- Species: C. tannuolana

Binomial name
- Clepsis tannuolana Kostyuk, 1973

Species of moth

Clepsis tannuolana is a species of moth of the family Tortricidae. It is found in Russia (Altai Mountains and the mountains of the Tuva Republic). The habitat consists of alpine grass-herb meadows.
