= Clepsis biformis =

Scientific classification
- Kingdom: Animalia
- Phylum: Arthropoda
- Clade: Pancrustacea
- Class: Insecta
- Order: Lepidoptera
- Family: Tortricidae
- Genus: Clepsis
- Species: C. biformis

Binomial name
- Clepsis biformis (Meyrick, 1920)

Synonyms
- Tortrix biformis Meyrick, 1920

Species of moth

Clepsis biformis is a species of moth of the family Tortricidae. It is found in Western Cape, South Africa.
