= Clepsis gelophodes =

Scientific classification
- Kingdom: Animalia
- Phylum: Arthropoda
- Clade: Pancrustacea
- Class: Insecta
- Order: Lepidoptera
- Family: Tortricidae
- Genus: Clepsis
- Species: C. gelophodes

Binomial name
- Clepsis gelophodes (Meyrick, 1936)

Synonyms
- Cacoecia gelophodes Meyrick, 1936

Species of moth

Clepsis gelophodes is a species of moth of the family Tortricidae. It is found in Venezuela and Colombia.
