= Clepsis neomelissa =

Scientific classification
- Kingdom: Animalia
- Phylum: Arthropoda
- Clade: Pancrustacea
- Class: Insecta
- Order: Lepidoptera
- Family: Tortricidae
- Genus: Clepsis
- Species: C. neomelissa

Binomial name
- Clepsis neomelissa (Rose & Pooni, 2004)

Synonyms
- Archips neomelissa Rose & Pooni, 2004

Species of moth

Clepsis neomelissa is a species of moth of the family Tortricidae. It is found in Himachal Pradesh, India.
