= Clepsis fumosa =

Scientific classification
- Kingdom: Animalia
- Phylum: Arthropoda
- Clade: Pancrustacea
- Class: Insecta
- Order: Lepidoptera
- Family: Tortricidae
- Genus: Clepsis
- Species: C. fumosa

Binomial name
- Clepsis fumosa Razowski & Becker, 2003

Species of moth

Clepsis fumosa is a species of moth of the family Tortricidae. It is found in Rio de Janeiro, Brazil.
