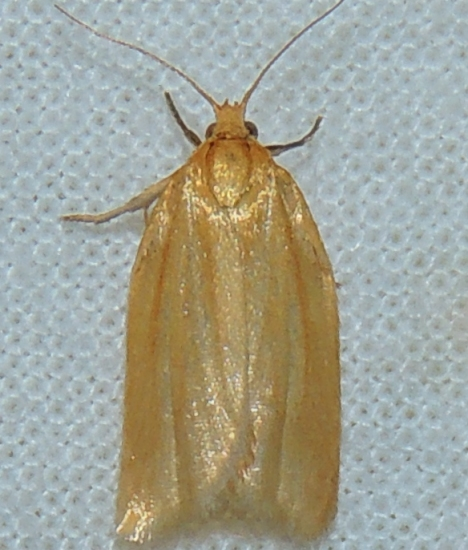
- Clepsis clemensiana

Scientific classification
- Kingdom: Animalia
- Phylum: Arthropoda
- Clade: Pancrustacea
- Class: Insecta
- Order: Lepidoptera
- Family: Tortricidae
- Genus: Clepsis
- Species: C. clemensiana

Binomial name
- Clepsis clemensiana (Fernald, 1879)

Synonyms
- Tortrix clemensiana Fernald, 1879; Archips clemensiana; Tortrix nervosana Kearfott, 1907

= Clepsis clemensiana =

Species of moth

Clepsis clemensiana, Clemens' clepsis moth, is a species of moth of the family Tortricidae. It is found in North America, where it has been recorded from southern Canada, the north-eastern and north-western United States, as well as from northern Utah to northern California.

The length of the forewings is 9.6–11.2 mm.

The larvae feed on Poaceae species, as well as on Aster, Symphyotrichum, Apocynum and Solidago species.

== Etymology ==
The species is named in honour of Dr. James Brackenridge Clemens, who collected the species.
