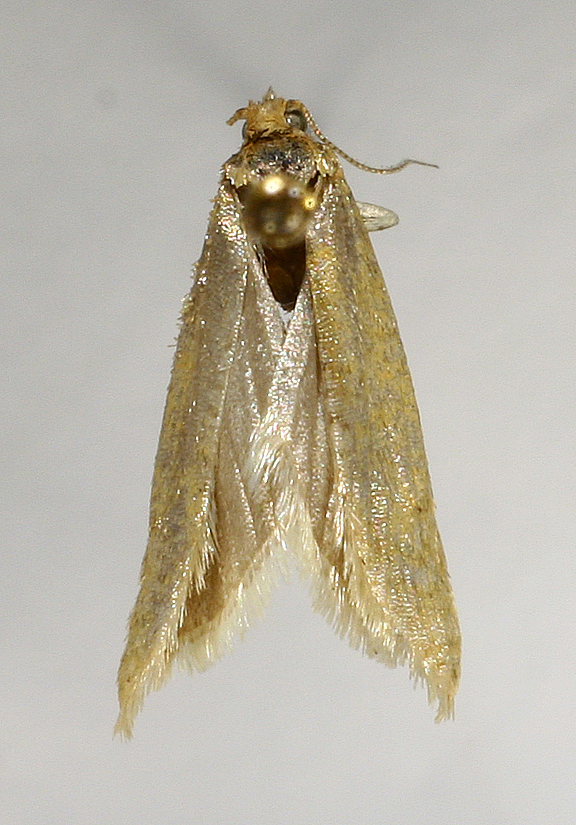

Scientific classification
- Kingdom: Animalia
- Phylum: Arthropoda
- Clade: Pancrustacea
- Class: Insecta
- Order: Lepidoptera
- Family: Tortricidae
- Genus: Clepsis
- Species: C. lindebergi

Binomial name
- Clepsis lindebergi (Krogerus, 1952)

Synonyms
- Tortrix lindebergi Krogerus, 1952

= Clepsis lindebergi =

Species of moth

Clepsis lindebergi is a moth of the family Tortricidae. It is found in a narrow area ranging from Finland, south through Poland, Slovakia and Austria to Italy.

It is endangered because of habitat loss. It is found on seminatural dry grasslands.

The wingspan is 18–20 mm. Adults are on wing from June to July.
