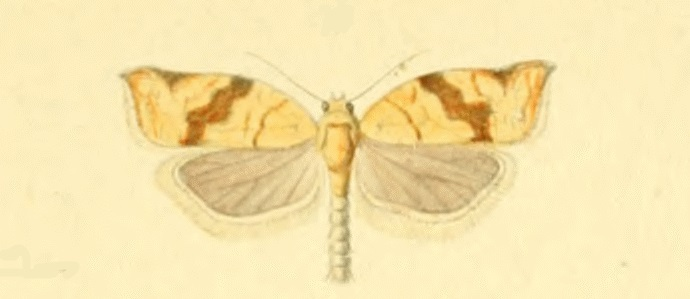

Scientific classification
- Kingdom: Animalia
- Phylum: Arthropoda
- Clade: Pancrustacea
- Class: Insecta
- Order: Lepidoptera
- Family: Tortricidae
- Genus: Clepsis
- Species: C. siciliana

Binomial name
- Clepsis siciliana (Ragonot, 1894)

Synonyms
- Tortrix siciliana Ragonot, 1894; Cacoecia fluxana Kennel, 1901; Archips granadanus Walsingham, 1903

= Clepsis siciliana =

Species of moth

Clepsis siciliana is a species of moth of the family Tortricidae. It is found in North Africa, France, Spain, Portugal and on Sicily.

The wingspan is 15–17 mm. Adults have been recorded on wing from June to July.
