= Clepsis peguncus =

Scientific classification
- Kingdom: Animalia
- Phylum: Arthropoda
- Clade: Pancrustacea
- Class: Insecta
- Order: Lepidoptera
- Family: Tortricidae
- Genus: Clepsis
- Species: C. peguncus

Binomial name
- Clepsis peguncus Razowski & Wojtusiak, 2013

Species of moth

Clepsis peguncus is a species of moth of the family Tortricidae. It is found in Ecuador (Papallacta Province).

The wingspan is about 16 mm.
