= Clepsis aliana =

Scientific classification
- Kingdom: Animalia
- Phylum: Arthropoda
- Clade: Pancrustacea
- Class: Insecta
- Order: Lepidoptera
- Family: Tortricidae
- Genus: Clepsis
- Species: C. aliana

Binomial name
- Clepsis aliana Kawabe, 1965

Species of moth

Clepsis aliana is a species of moth of the family Tortricidae. It is found on Hokkaido island in Japan.

The wingspan is 21–23 mm.
