= Clepsis assensus =

Scientific classification
- Kingdom: Animalia
- Phylum: Arthropoda
- Clade: Pancrustacea
- Class: Insecta
- Order: Lepidoptera
- Family: Tortricidae
- Genus: Clepsis
- Species: C. assensus

Binomial name
- Clepsis assensus Razowski & Pelz, 2004

Species of insect

Clepsis assensus is a species of moth of the family Tortricidae. It is known from Morona-Santiago Province, Ecuador.

The wing span is about 12 mm (0.47 in).
