= Clepsis staintoni =

Scientific classification
- Kingdom: Animalia
- Phylum: Arthropoda
- Clade: Pancrustacea
- Class: Insecta
- Order: Lepidoptera
- Family: Tortricidae
- Genus: Clepsis
- Species: C. staintoni

Binomial name
- Clepsis staintoni Obraztsov, 1955

Synonyms
- Tortrix reticulata Stainton, 1859 (preocc.)

Species of moth

Clepsis staintoni is a species of moth of the family Tortricidae. It is found on Madeira.
