= Clepsis crispata =

Scientific classification
- Kingdom: Animalia
- Phylum: Arthropoda
- Clade: Pancrustacea
- Class: Insecta
- Order: Lepidoptera
- Family: Tortricidae
- Genus: Clepsis
- Species: C. crispata

Binomial name
- Clepsis crispata (Meyrick, 1912)

Synonyms
- Tortrix crispata Meyrick, 1912

Species of moth

Clepsis crispata is a species of moth of the family Tortricidae. It is found in KwaZulu-Natal, South Africa.
