= Clepsis orycta =

Scientific classification
- Kingdom: Animalia
- Phylum: Arthropoda
- Clade: Pancrustacea
- Class: Insecta
- Order: Lepidoptera
- Family: Tortricidae
- Genus: Clepsis
- Species: C. orycta

Binomial name
- Clepsis orycta (Walsingham, 1914)

Synonyms
- Tortrix orycta Walsingham, 1914

Species of moth

Clepsis orycta is a species of moth of the family Tortricidae. It is found in Veracruz, Mexico.

The wingspan is about 17 mm. The forewings are mouse grey with brownish transverse lines. The hindwings are cinereous (ash grey) with brownish-grey shade-spots.
