= Clepsis stenophora =

Scientific classification
- Kingdom: Animalia
- Phylum: Arthropoda
- Clade: Pancrustacea
- Class: Insecta
- Order: Lepidoptera
- Family: Tortricidae
- Genus: Clepsis
- Species: C. stenophora

Binomial name
- Clepsis stenophora (Bradley, 1965)

Synonyms
- Tortrix stenophora Bradley, 1965

Species of moth

Clepsis stenophora is a species of moth of the family Tortricidae. It is found in Uganda.
