= Clepsis provocata =

Scientific classification
- Kingdom: Animalia
- Phylum: Arthropoda
- Clade: Pancrustacea
- Class: Insecta
- Order: Lepidoptera
- Family: Tortricidae
- Genus: Clepsis
- Species: C. provocata

Binomial name
- Clepsis provocata (Meyrick, 1912)

Synonyms
- Catamacta provocata Meyrick, 1912; Capua provocata

Species of moth

Clepsis provocata is a species of moth of the family Tortricidae. It is found in Taiwan and Assam, India.
