= Clepsis pinaria =

Scientific classification
- Kingdom: Animalia
- Phylum: Arthropoda
- Clade: Pancrustacea
- Class: Insecta
- Order: Lepidoptera
- Family: Tortricidae
- Genus: Clepsis
- Species: C. pinaria

Binomial name
- Clepsis pinaria Razowski & Becker, 2010

Species of moth

Clepsis pinaria is a species of moth of the family Tortricidae. It is found in Cuba.

The wingspan is 10–13.5 mm.
