= Clepsis miserulana =

Scientific classification
- Kingdom: Animalia
- Phylum: Arthropoda
- Clade: Pancrustacea
- Class: Insecta
- Order: Lepidoptera
- Family: Tortricidae
- Genus: Clepsis
- Species: C. miserulana

Binomial name
- Clepsis miserulana (Zeller, 1877)

Synonyms
- Tortrix miserulana Zeller, 1877

Species of moth

Clepsis miserulana is a species of moth of the family Tortricidae. It is found in Colombia.
