= Clepsis brachyptycta =

Scientific classification
- Kingdom: Animalia
- Phylum: Arthropoda
- Clade: Pancrustacea
- Class: Insecta
- Order: Lepidoptera
- Family: Tortricidae
- Genus: Clepsis
- Species: C. brachyptycta

Binomial name
- Clepsis brachyptycta (Meyrick, 1938)

Synonyms
- Tortrix brachyptycta Meyrick, 1938

Species of moth

Clepsis brachyptycta is a species of moth of the family Tortricidae. It is found in the Democratic Republic of Congo and other countries in central Africa.
