= Clepsis lineata =

Scientific classification
- Kingdom: Animalia
- Phylum: Arthropoda
- Clade: Pancrustacea
- Class: Insecta
- Order: Lepidoptera
- Family: Tortricidae
- Genus: Clepsis
- Species: C. lineata

Binomial name
- Clepsis lineata Razowski & Pelz, 2004

Species of moth

Clepsis lineata is a species of moth of the family Tortricidae. It is known from Morona-Santiago Province, Ecuador.

The wing span is 11–12 mm (0.43–0.47 in).
