= Clepsis ingenua =

Scientific classification
- Kingdom: Animalia
- Phylum: Arthropoda
- Clade: Pancrustacea
- Class: Insecta
- Order: Lepidoptera
- Family: Tortricidae
- Genus: Clepsis
- Species: C. ingenua

Binomial name
- Clepsis ingenua (Meyrick, 1912)

Synonyms
- Epichorista ingenua Meyrick, 1912

Species of moth

Clepsis ingenua is a species of moth of the family Tortricidae. It is found in Sikkim, India.
