= Clepsis laetornata =

Scientific classification
- Kingdom: Animalia
- Phylum: Arthropoda
- Clade: Pancrustacea
- Class: Insecta
- Order: Lepidoptera
- Family: Tortricidae
- Genus: Clepsis
- Species: C. laetornata

Binomial name
- Clepsis laetornata Wang Li & Wang, 2003

Species of moth

Clepsis laetornata is a species of moth of the family Tortricidae. It is found in Yunnan, China.

The length of the forewings is 7–8 mm.
