= Clepsis retiferana =

Scientific classification
- Kingdom: Animalia
- Phylum: Arthropoda
- Clade: Pancrustacea
- Class: Insecta
- Order: Lepidoptera
- Family: Tortricidae
- Genus: Clepsis
- Species: C. retiferana

Binomial name
- Clepsis retiferana (Stainton, 1859)

Synonyms
- Tortrix retiferana Stainton, 1859

Species of moth

Clepsis retiferana is a species of moth of the family Tortricidae. It is found on Madeira.
