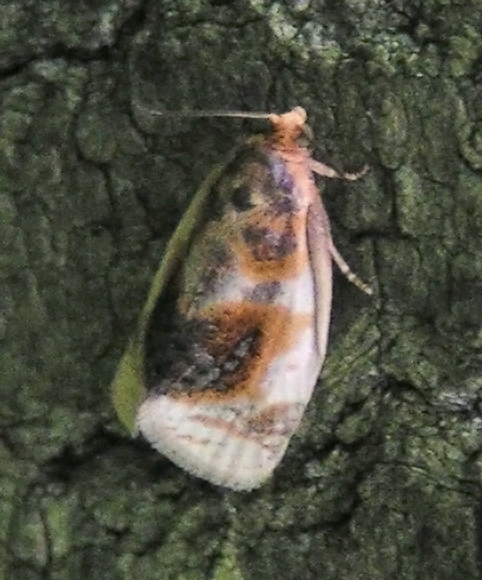

Scientific classification
- Kingdom: Animalia
- Phylum: Arthropoda
- Clade: Pancrustacea
- Class: Insecta
- Order: Lepidoptera
- Family: Tortricidae
- Genus: Clepsis
- Species: C. melaleucana

Binomial name
- Clepsis melaleucana (Walker, 1863)

Synonyms
- Lophoderus melaleucanus Walker, 1863; Clepsis melaleucanus; Lozotaenia biustulana Stephens, 1834; Conchylis invexana Walker, 1863; Ptycholoma semifuscana Clemens, 1864

= Clepsis melaleucana =

Species of moth

Clepsis melaleucana, the black-patched clepsis, is a moth of the family Tortricidae. The species was first described by Francis Walker in 1863. It is found in North America from Alberta to Newfoundland, south to North Carolina and Missouri.

The forewing is yellowish cream and has a large dark brown blotch that extends diagonally upward from the inner margin near the anal angle. Between the large blotch and the thorax, there may be other brown blotches and shading because it varies from each moth in the species. It has a wingspan that ranges from 18 to 25 millimeters. Adults are on wing from May to July.
