= Clepsis devexa =

Scientific classification
- Kingdom: Animalia
- Phylum: Arthropoda
- Clade: Pancrustacea
- Class: Insecta
- Order: Lepidoptera
- Family: Tortricidae
- Genus: Clepsis
- Species: C. devexa

Binomial name
- Clepsis devexa (Meyrick, 1926)

Synonyms
- Tortrix devexa Meyrick, 1926

Species of moth

Clepsis devexa is a species of moth from the family Tortricidae. It is found in Colombia and Ecuador (Tungurahua Province, Carchi Province).
