= Clepsis listerana =

Scientific classification
- Kingdom: Animalia
- Phylum: Arthropoda
- Clade: Pancrustacea
- Class: Insecta
- Order: Lepidoptera
- Family: Tortricidae
- Genus: Clepsis
- Species: C. listerana

Binomial name
- Clepsis listerana (Kearfott, 1907)

Synonyms
- Phalonia listerana Kearfott, 1907

Species of moth

Clepsis listerana is a species of moth of the family Tortricidae. It is found in North America, where it has been recorded from southern Quebec south to Tennessee and North Carolina.

The wingspan is 11–12 mm. Adults have been recorded on wing from June to September.
