= Clepsis burgasiensis =

Scientific classification
- Kingdom: Animalia
- Phylum: Arthropoda
- Clade: Pancrustacea
- Class: Insecta
- Order: Lepidoptera
- Family: Tortricidae
- Genus: Clepsis
- Species: C. burgasiensis

Binomial name
- Clepsis burgasiensis (Rebel, 1916)

Synonyms
- Tortrix burgasiensis Rebel, 1916; Tortrix burgasensis Drenovski, 1924; Tortrix burgisana Thurner, 1941

Species of moth

Clepsis burgasiensis is a species of moth of the family Tortricidae. It is found in Bulgaria and North Macedonia.

The wingspan is 14–16 mm. The ground colour of the forewings is ochreous yellow with red-brown markings. The hindwings are dark brownish grey. Adults have been recorded on wing from August to October.
