= Clepsis monticolana =

Scientific classification
- Kingdom: Animalia
- Phylum: Arthropoda
- Clade: Pancrustacea
- Class: Insecta
- Order: Lepidoptera
- Family: Tortricidae
- Genus: Clepsis
- Species: C. monticolana

Binomial name
- Clepsis monticolana Kawabe, 1964

Species of moth

Clepsis monticolana is a species of moth of the family Tortricidae. It is found in Japan on the island of Honshu.

The wingspan is 18–24 mm.
