= Clepsis luctuosana =

Scientific classification
- Kingdom: Animalia
- Phylum: Arthropoda
- Clade: Pancrustacea
- Class: Insecta
- Order: Lepidoptera
- Family: Tortricidae
- Genus: Clepsis
- Species: C. luctuosana

Binomial name
- Clepsis luctuosana (Rebel, 1914)

Synonyms
- Cnephasia luctuosana Rebel, 1914; Cnephasia lutosana Rebel, 1914

Species of moth

Clepsis luctuosana is a species of moth of the family Tortricidae. It is found in Central Asia (the Tian Shan mountains) and China (Xinjiang).
