= Clepsis browni =

Scientific classification
- Kingdom: Animalia
- Phylum: Arthropoda
- Clade: Pancrustacea
- Class: Insecta
- Order: Lepidoptera
- Family: Tortricidae
- Genus: Clepsis
- Species: C. browni

Binomial name
- Clepsis browni Razowski & Pelz, 2004

Species of moth

Clepsis browni is a species of moth of the family Tortricidae. It is named for John Wesley Brown from the Smithsonian Institution. It is known from Morona-Santiago Province, Ecuador.

The wing span is 10–11 mm (0.39–0.43 in).
