= Clepsis flavifasciaria =

Scientific classification
- Kingdom: Animalia
- Phylum: Arthropoda
- Clade: Pancrustacea
- Class: Insecta
- Order: Lepidoptera
- Family: Tortricidae
- Genus: Clepsis
- Species: C. flavifasciaria

Binomial name
- Clepsis flavifasciaria Wang Li & Wang, 2003

Species of moth

Clepsis flavifasciaria is a species of moth of the family Tortricidae. It is found in Shaanxi, China.

The length of the forewings is 9.5 mm for males and 10.5 mm for females.
