= Clepsis fluxa =

Scientific classification
- Kingdom: Animalia
- Phylum: Arthropoda
- Clade: Pancrustacea
- Class: Insecta
- Order: Lepidoptera
- Family: Tortricidae
- Genus: Clepsis
- Species: C. fluxa

Binomial name
- Clepsis fluxa Razowski & Becker, 2003

Species of moth

Clepsis fluxa is a species of moth of the family Tortricidae. It is found in Santa Catarina, Brazil.
