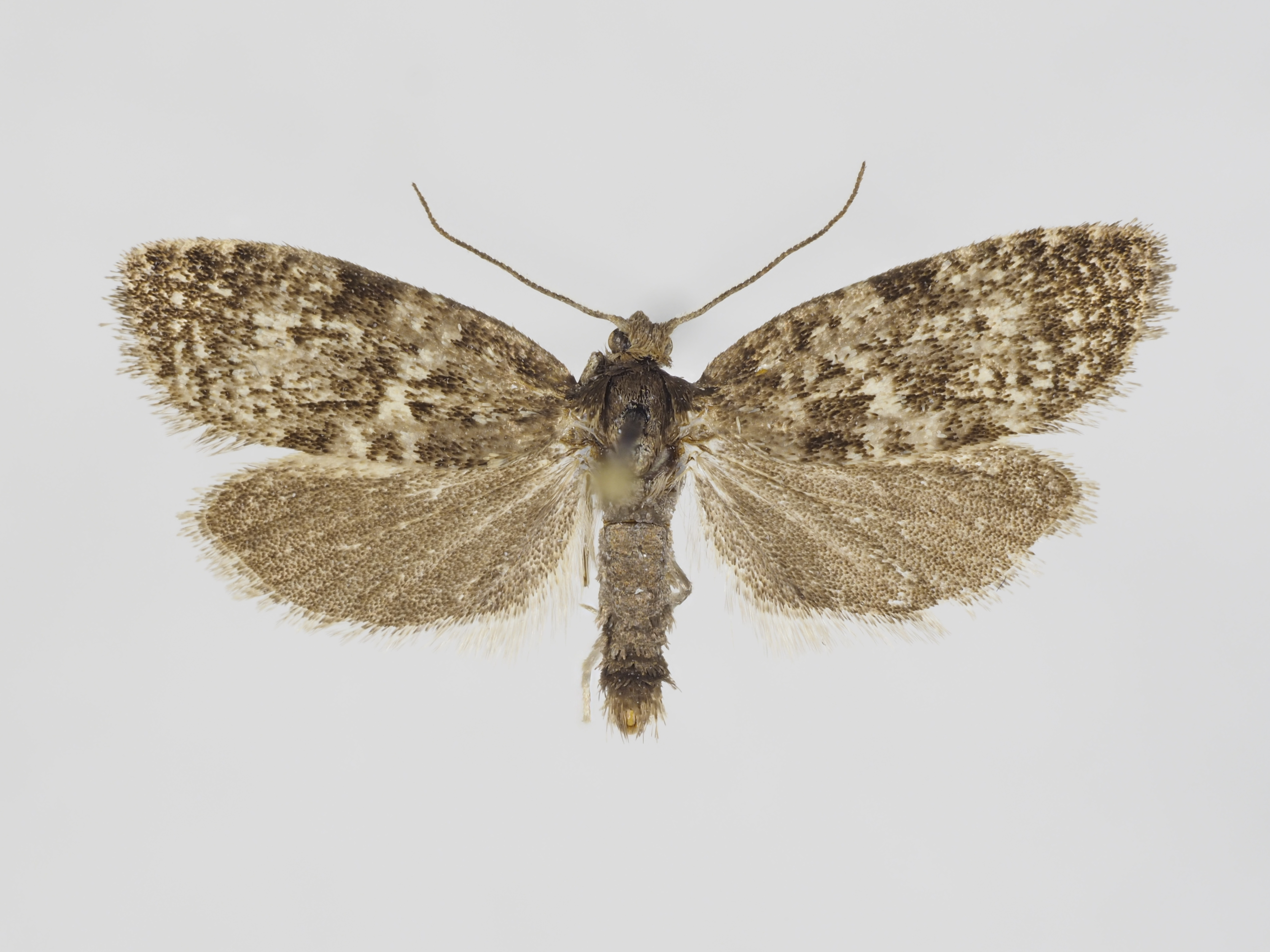

Scientific classification
- Kingdom: Animalia
- Phylum: Arthropoda
- Clade: Pancrustacea
- Class: Insecta
- Order: Lepidoptera
- Family: Tortricidae
- Genus: Clepsis
- Species: C. nybomi

Binomial name
- Clepsis nybomi Hackman, 1950

Synonyms
- Tortrix fuliginosana Hackman, 1950 (preocc.)

= Clepsis nybomi =

Species of moth

Clepsis nybomi is a species of moth of the family Tortricidae. It is found in northern Sweden and Finland, as well as Russia (the southern Ural). The habitat consists of taiga forest with luxurious lower vegetation.

The wingspan is about 16 mm. Adults have been recorded on wing in June.
