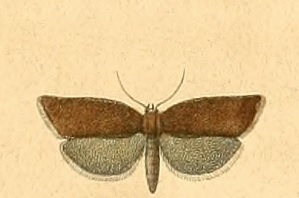

Scientific classification
- Kingdom: Animalia
- Phylum: Arthropoda
- Clade: Pancrustacea
- Class: Insecta
- Order: Lepidoptera
- Family: Tortricidae
- Genus: Clepsis
- Species: C. unicolorana

Binomial name
- Clepsis unicolorana (Duponchel, 1835)

Synonyms
- Tortrix unicolorana Duponchel, in Godart, 1835; Tortrix asphodilana Herrich-Schäffer, 1851; Tortrix aspodilana Herrich-Schäffer, 1847; Tortrix unicolorana var. iberica Kennel, 1910; Tortrix labatiana Breignet, 1890; Tortrix uhagonana Constant, 1891; Tortrix unicolorana var. uhagoni Seebold, 1898

= Clepsis unicolorana =

Species of moth

Clepsis unicolorana is a moth of the family Tortricidae. It was described by Philogène Auguste Joseph Duponchel in 1835. It is found in France, Spain, Switzerland and Italy.

The wingspan is 20–24 mm.

The larvae feed on Asphodelus aestivus. They mine the leaves of their host plant. The mine is full depth. The mined leaves are bound together with silk. Pupation takes place within the mine. Larvae can be found in March.
