= Clepsis rasilis =

Scientific classification
- Kingdom: Animalia
- Phylum: Arthropoda
- Clade: Pancrustacea
- Class: Insecta
- Order: Lepidoptera
- Family: Tortricidae
- Genus: Clepsis
- Species: C. rasilis

Binomial name
- Clepsis rasilis Razowski, 1979

Species of moth

Clepsis rasilis is a species of moth of the family Tortricidae. It is found in Durango, Mexico.
