= Clepsis fraterna =

Scientific classification
- Kingdom: Animalia
- Phylum: Arthropoda
- Clade: Pancrustacea
- Class: Insecta
- Order: Lepidoptera
- Family: Tortricidae
- Genus: Clepsis
- Species: C. fraterna

Binomial name
- Clepsis fraterna Razowski & Pelz, 2004

Species of moth

Clepsis fraterna is a species of moth of the family Tortricidae. It is known from Ecuador with records from the provinces of Morona-Santiago and Loja.

The wing span is 10.5–12 mm (0.41–0.47 in).
