= Clepsis tassa =

Scientific classification
- Kingdom: Animalia
- Phylum: Arthropoda
- Clade: Pancrustacea
- Class: Insecta
- Order: Lepidoptera
- Family: Tortricidae
- Genus: Clepsis
- Species: C. tassa

Binomial name
- Clepsis tassa Razowski & Pelz, 2004

Species of moth

Clepsis tassa is a species of moth of the family Tortricidae. It is known from Morona-Santiago Province, Ecuador.

The wing span is 12 mm (0.47 in).
