= Clepsis humana =

Scientific classification
- Kingdom: Animalia
- Phylum: Arthropoda
- Clade: Pancrustacea
- Class: Insecta
- Order: Lepidoptera
- Family: Tortricidae
- Genus: Clepsis
- Species: C. humana

Binomial name
- Clepsis humana (Meyrick, 1912)

Synonyms
- Tortrix humana Meyrick, 1912; Mochlopyga humana; Machlopyga khola Yasuda, 1969; Tortrix noseropis Meyrick, 1928

Species of moth

Clepsis humana is a species of moth of the family Tortricidae. It is found in Sikkim, India and in Nepal.
