= Clepsis ketmenana =

Scientific classification
- Kingdom: Animalia
- Phylum: Arthropoda
- Clade: Pancrustacea
- Class: Insecta
- Order: Lepidoptera
- Family: Tortricidae
- Genus: Clepsis
- Species: C. ketmenana

Binomial name
- Clepsis ketmenana (Falkovitsh, in Danilevsky, Kuznetsov & Falkovitsh, 1962)

Synonyms
- Tortrix ketmenana Falkovitsh, in Danilevsky, Kuznetsov & Falkovitsh, 1962

Species of moth

Clepsis ketmenana is a species of moth of the family Tortricidae. It is found in Kazakhstan.
