= Clepsis terevalva =

Scientific classification
- Kingdom: Animalia
- Phylum: Arthropoda
- Clade: Pancrustacea
- Class: Insecta
- Order: Lepidoptera
- Family: Tortricidae
- Genus: Clepsis
- Species: C. terevalva

Binomial name
- Clepsis terevalva Razowski & Wojtusiak, 2008

Species of moth

Clepsis terevalva is a species of moth of the family Tortricidae. It is known from Zamora-Chinchipe Province, Ecuador.

The wingspan is about 15 mm.
