= Clepsis melissa =

Scientific classification
- Kingdom: Animalia
- Phylum: Arthropoda
- Clade: Pancrustacea
- Class: Insecta
- Order: Lepidoptera
- Family: Tortricidae
- Genus: Clepsis
- Species: C. melissa

Binomial name
- Clepsis melissa (Meyrick, 1908)

Synonyms
- Capua melissa Meyrick, 1908; Capua epiclintes Meyrick, 1928

Species of moth

Clepsis melissa is a moth of the family Tortricidae. It is found in India, Nepal, China (Sichuan, Yunnan) and Vietnam.
