= Clepsis plumbeolana =

Scientific classification
- Kingdom: Animalia
- Phylum: Arthropoda
- Clade: Pancrustacea
- Class: Insecta
- Order: Lepidoptera
- Family: Tortricidae
- Genus: Clepsis
- Species: C. plumbeolana

Binomial name
- Clepsis plumbeolana (Bremer, 1865)

Synonyms
- Tortrix plumbeolana Bremer, 1865; Ptycholoma plumbeolana; Ptycholoma yakutica Kocak, 1986

Species of moth

Clepsis plumbeolana is a species of moth of the family Tortricidae. It is found in Russia (Primorye, Amur), China (Heilongjiang) and North Korea.
