= Pyrausta apicalis =

Scientific classification
- Kingdom: Animalia
- Phylum: Arthropoda
- Class: Insecta
- Order: Lepidoptera
- Family: Crambidae
- Genus: Pyrausta
- Species: P. apicalis

Binomial name
- Pyrausta apicalis (Hampson, 1913)

Synonyms
- Cybolomia apicalis Hampson, 1913

Species of moth

Pyrausta apicalis is a moth in the family Crambidae. It was described by George Hampson in 1913. It is found in South Africa, Eswatini and Zimbabwe.
