= Clepsis gnathocera =

Scientific classification
- Kingdom: Animalia
- Phylum: Arthropoda
- Clade: Pancrustacea
- Class: Insecta
- Order: Lepidoptera
- Family: Tortricidae
- Genus: Clepsis
- Species: C. gnathocera

Binomial name
- Clepsis gnathocera Razowski, 2006

Species of moth

Clepsis gnathocera is a species of moth of the family Tortricidae. It is found in Eswatini.

The wingspan is about 22 mm.
