= List of Lepidoptera of the Canary Islands =

Location of the Canary Islands

The Lepidoptera of the Canary Islands consist of both the butterflies and moths recorded from the Canary Islands.

According to a recent estimate, there are a total of about 710 Lepidoptera species present in the Canary Islands.

== Butterflies ==
=== Hesperiidae ===
- Thymelicus acteon christi Rebel, 1894 (uncertain taxonomic status)

=== Lycaenidae ===
- Aricia cramera Eschscholtz, 1821
- Azanus ubaldus (Stoll, 1782)
- Cacyreus marshalli Butler, 1898
- Lampides boeticus (Linnaeus, 1767)
- Leptotes pirithous (Linnaeus, 1767)
- Leptotes webbianus (Brulle, 1839)
- Lycaena phlaeas (Linnaeus, 1761)
- Polyommatus celina (Austaut, 1879)
- Zizeeria knysna (Trimen, 1862)

=== Nymphalidae ===
- Argynnis pandora (Denis & Schiffermuller, 1775)
- Danaus chrysippus (Linnaeus, 1758)
- Danaus plexippus (Linnaeus, 1758)
- Hipparchia wyssii bacchus Higgins, 1967
- Hipparchia wyssii gomera Higgins, 1967
- Hipparchia wyssii tamadabae Owen & Smith, 1992
- Hipparchia wyssii tilosi Manil, 1984
- Hipparchia wyssii wyssii (Christ, 1889)
- Hypolimnas misippus (Linnaeus, 1764)
- Issoria lathonia (Linnaeus, 1758)
- Maniola jurtina (Linnaeus, 1758)
- Pararge xiphioides Staudinger, 1871
- Vanessa atalanta (Linnaeus, 1758)
- Vanessa cardui (Linnaeus, 1758)
- Vanessa virginiensis (Drury, 1773)
- Vanessa vulcania (Godart, 1819)

=== Pieridae ===
- Catopsilia florella (Fabricius, 1775)
- Colias croceus (Fourcroy, 1785)
- Euchloe charlonia (Donzel, 1842)
- Euchloe belemia eversi Stamm, 1963
- Euchloe belemia grancanariensis Acosta, 2008
- Euchloe belemia hesperidum Rothschild, 1913
- Gonepteryx cleobule (Hübner, 1830)
- Pieris cheiranthi (Hübner, 1808)
- Pieris rapae (Linnaeus, 1758)
- Pontia daplidice (Linnaeus, 1758)

== Moths ==
=== Alucitidae ===
- Alucita canariensis Scholz & Jackh, 1994

=== Autostichidae ===
- Ambloma brachyptera Walsingham, 1908
- Ambloma klimeschi Gozmany, 1975
- Apatema fasciata (Stainton, 1859)
- Apatema junnilaineni Vives, 2001
- Apatema lucidum Walsingham, 1908
- Apatema mediopallidum Walsingham, 1900
- Chersogenes victimella Walsingham, 1908
- Dysallomima coarctella (Rebel, 1896)
- Epanastasis canariensis (Rebel, 1906)
- Epanastasis eupracta Gozmany, 1988
- Epanastasis excellens Gozmany, 1977
- Epanastasis sophroniellus (Rebel, 1895)
- Holcopogon bubulcellus (Staudinger, 1859)
- Oecia oecophila (Staudinger, 1876)

=== Bedelliidae ===
- Bedellia silvicolella Klimesch, 1968
- Bedellia somnulentella (Zeller, 1847)

=== Blastobasidae ===
- Blastobasis exclusa (Walsingham, 1908)
- Blastobasis helleri Rebel, 1910
- Blastobasis insularis (Wollaston, 1858)
- Blastobasis marmorosella (Wollaston, 1858)
- Blastobasis phycidella (Zeller, 1839)
- Blastobasis rubiginosella Rebel, 1896
- Blastobasis velutina Walsingham, 1908
- Zenodochium polyphagum Walsingham, 1908
- Zenodochium sostra Walsingham, 1910

=== Bucculatricidae ===
- Bucculatrix canariensis Walsingham, 1908
- Bucculatrix chrysanthemella Rebel, 1896
- Bucculatrix phagnalella Walsingham, 1908

=== Carposinidae ===
- Carposina cinderella Diakonoff, 1989
- Carposina gigantella Rebel, 1917
- Carposina sublucida Diakonoff, 1988

=== Choreutidae ===
- Choreutis nemorana (Hübner, 1799)
- Tebenna micalis (Mann, 1857)

=== Coleophoridae ===
- Coleophora aegyptiacae Walsingham, 1907
- Coleophora albidorsella Toll, 1942
- Coleophora areniphila Toll, 1957
- Coleophora aularia Meyrick, 1924
- Coleophora confluella Rebel, 1892
- Coleophora discomaculella Toll & Amsel, 1967
- Coleophora gibberosa Baldizzone, 2003
- Coleophora gracilella Toll, 1952
- Coleophora granulatella Zeller, 1849
- Coleophora haoma Baldizzone, 1994
- Coleophora internitens Baldizzone & van der Wolf, 1999
- Coleophora hospitiella Chretien, 1915
- Coleophora hystricella Toll, 1957
- Coleophora lassella Staudinger, 1859
- Coleophora loti Falkovitsh, 1978
- Coleophora microalbella Amsel, 1935
- Coleophora micromeriae Walsingham, 1908
- Coleophora neglecta Baldizzone, 1997
- Coleophora orotavensis Rebel, 1896
- Coleophora pinkeri Baldizzone, 1982
- Coleophora polycarpaeae Hering, 1927
- Coleophora pseudopoecilella Klimesch, 1982
- Coleophora salicorniae Heinemann & Wocke, 1877
- Coleophora salviella Chretien, 1916
- Coleophora sarehma Toll, 1956
- Coleophora semicinerea Staudinger, 1859
- Coleophora teneriffella Baldizzone, 1987
- Coleophora versurella Zeller, 1849
- Ischnophanes canariella Baldizzone, 1984

=== Cosmopterigidae ===
- Anatrachyntis badia (Hodges, 1962)
- Anatrachyntis rileyi (Walsingham, 1882)
- Ascalenia acaciella Chretien, 1915
- Ascalenia vanella (Frey, 1860)
- Coccidiphila gerasimovi Danilevsky, 1950
- Coccidiphila kasypinkeri Traugott-Olsen, 1986
- Coccidiphila ledereriella (Zeller, 1850)
- Coccidiphila patriciae J. Nel & A. Nel, 2000
- Coccidiphila riedli Traugott-Olsen, 1986
- Cosmopterix attenuatella (Walker, 1864)
- Cosmopterix coryphaea Walsingham, 1908
- Cosmopterix crassicervicella Chretien, 1896
- Cosmopterix pulchrimella Chambers, 1875
- Cosmopterix turbidella Rebel, 1896
- Eteobalea thaumatella (Walsingham, 1907)
- Hodgesiella rhodorrhisella (Kasy, 1970)
- Pyroderces argyrogrammos (Zeller, 1847)

=== Cossidae ===
- Stygia hades Le Cerf, 1924
- Stygia nilssoni Saldaitis & Yakovlev, 2008
- Wiltshirocossus aries (Pungeler, 1902)

=== Crambidae ===
- Agriphila tersellus (Lederer, 1855)
- Agriphila trabeatellus (Herrich-Schäffer, 1848)
- Ancylolomia palpella (Denis & Schiffermuller, 1775)
- Ancylolomia tripolitella Rebel, 1909
- Antigastra catalaunalis (Duponchel, 1833)
- Aporodes floralis (Hübner, 1809)
- Arnia nervosalis Guenee, 1849
- Botyodes diniasalis (Walker, 1859)
- Cataonia erubescens (Christoph, 1877)
- Cornifrons ulceratalis Lederer, 1858
- Cynaeda dentalis (Denis & Schiffermuller, 1775)
- Dentifovea praecultalis (Rebel, 1896)
- Diaphania indica (Saunders, 1851)
- Diasemiopsis ramburialis (Duponchel, 1834)
- Diplopseustis perieresalis (Walker, 1859)
- Dolicharthria heringi (Rebel, 1939)
- Duponchelia fovealis Zeller, 1847
- Ecpyrrhorrhoe diffusalis (Guenee, 1854)
- Euchromius cambridgei (Zeller, 1867)
- Euchromius ocellea (Haworth, 1811)
- Euchromius vinculellus (Zeller, 1847)
- Eudonia angustea (Curtis, 1827)
- Eudonia decorella (Stainton, 1859)
- Eudonia geminoflexuosa Nuss, Karsholt & Meyer, 1998
- Eudonia lineola (Curtis, 1827)
- Eudonia parviangusta Nuss, Karsholt & Meyer, 1998
- Evergestis desertalis (Hübner, 1813)
- Evergestis isatidalis (Duponchel, 1833)
- Hellula undalis (Fabricius, 1781)
- Herpetogramma basalis (Walker, 1866)
- Herpetogramma licarsisalis (Walker, 1859)
- Hodebertia testalis (Fabricius, 1794)
- Hydriris ornatalis (Duponchel, 1832)
- Loxostege deliblatica Szent-Ivany & Uhrik-Meszaros, 1942
- Mecyna asinalis (Hübner, 1819)
- Mecyna atlanticum (Bethune-Baker, 1894)
- Mesocrambus canariensis Ganev, 1987
- Mesocrambus tamsi Błeszyński, 1960
- Metasia suppandalis (Hübner, 1823)
- Nomophila noctuella (Denis & Schiffermuller, 1775)
- Palepicorsia ustrinalis (Christoph, 1877)
- Palpita vitrealis (Rossi, 1794)
- Parapediasia teterrellus (Zincken, 1821)
- Prionapteryx lancerotella (Rebel, 1892)
- Pseudobissetia terrestrellus (Christoph, 1885)
- Pyrausta aurata (Scopoli, 1763)
- Pyrausta sanguinalis (Linnaeus, 1767)
- Sitochroa palealis (Denis & Schiffermuller, 1775)
- Spoladea recurvalis (Fabricius, 1775)
- Trichophysetis whitei Rebel, 1906
- Udea ferrugalis (Hübner, 1796)
- Udea nordmanni (Rebel, 1935)
- Udea numeralis (Hübner, 1796)
- Uresiphita gilvata (Fabricius, 1794)

=== Elachistidae ===
- Agonopterix cinerariae Walsingham, 1908
- Agonopterix heracliana (Linnaeus, 1758)
- Agonopterix mutatella Hannemann, 1989
- Agonopterix nodiflorella (Milliere, 1866)
- Agonopterix perezi Walsingham, 1908
- Agonopterix vendettella (Chretien, 1908)
- Agonopterix yeatiana (Fabricius, 1781)
- Depressaria absynthiella Herrich-Schäffer, 1865
- Depressaria daucella (Denis & Schiffermuller, 1775)
- Depressaria discipunctella Herrich-Schäffer, 1854
- Depressaria veneficella Zeller, 1847
- Elachista canariella Nielsen & Traugott-Olsen, 1987
- Elachista contaminatella Zeller, 1847
- Ethmia bipunctella (Fabricius, 1775)
- Ethmia quadrinotella (Mann, 1861)
- Exaeretia conciliatella (Rebel, 1892)
- Perittia carlinella (Walsingham, 1908)
- Perittia echiella (de Joannis, 1902)
- Stephensia cedronellae (Walsingham, 1908)

=== Epermeniidae ===
- Epermenia aequidentellus (E. Hofmann, 1867)
- Epermenia strictellus (Wocke, 1867)

=== Erebidae ===
- Anomis erosa Hübner, 1810
- Anomis flava (Fabricius, 1775)
- Anumeta hilgerti (Rothschild, 1909)
- Autophila dilucida (Hübner, 1808)
- Autophila rosea (Staudinger, 1888)
- Canararctia rufescens (Brulle, 1836)
- Cerocala algiriae Oberthur, 1876
- Clytie illunaris (Hübner, 1813)
- Dicallomera fortunata (Rogenhofer, 1891)
- Drasteria philippina (Austadt, 1880)
- Eilema albicosta (Rogenhofer, 1894)
- Eublemma baccalix (Swinhoe, 1886)
- Eublemma cochylioides (Guenee, 1852)
- Eublemma ostrina (Hübner, 1808)
- Eublemma parva (Hübner, 1808)
- Eublemma scitula Rambur, 1833
- Gnamptonyx innexa (Walker, 1858)
- Grammodes stolida (Fabricius, 1775)
- Hypena lividalis (Hübner, 1796)
- Hypena obacerralis Walker, 1859
- Hypena obsitalis (Hübner, 1813)
- Metachrostis velox (Hübner, 1813)
- Ophiusa tirhaca (Cramer, 1773)
- Pandesma robusta (Walker, 1858)
- Rhynchina canariensis Pinker, 1962
- Schrankia costaestrigalis (Stephens, 1834)
- Tathorhynchus exsiccata (Lederer, 1855)
- Utetheisa pulchella (Linnaeus, 1758)

=== Euteliidae ===
- Eutelia adulatrix (Hübner, 1813)

=== Gelechiidae ===
- Anarsia acaciae Walsingham, 1896
- Aproaerema anthyllidella (Hübner, 1813)
- Aproaerema mercedella Walsingham, 1908
- Aroga aristotelis (Milliere, 1876)
- Athrips fagoniae (Walsingham, 1904)
- Bryotropha domestica (Haworth, 1828)
- Bryotropha plebejella (Zeller, 1847)
- Carpatolechia decorella (Haworth, 1812)
- Caryocolum sciurella (Walsingham, 1908)
- Chrysoesthia bosae (Walsingham, 1908)
- Crossobela trinotella (Herrich-Schäffer, 1856)
- Dichomeris acuminatus (Staudinger, 1876)
- Dichomeris lamprostoma (Zeller, 1847)
- Ephysteris promptella (Staudinger, 1859)
- Epidola stigma Staudinger, 1859
- Gelechia sabinellus (Zeller, 1839)
- Helcystogramma convolvuli (Walsingham, 1908)
- Mesophleps corsicella Herrich-Schäffer, 1856
- Mesophleps oxycedrella (Milliere, 1871)
- Metzneria aestivella (Zeller, 1839)
- Metzneria castiliella (Moschler, 1866)
- Metzneria tenuiella (Mann, 1864)
- Metzneria torosulella (Rebel, 1893)
- Microlechia chretieni Turati, 1924
- Microlechia klimeschi (Povolny, 1972)
- Microlechia rhamnifoliae (Amsel & Hering, 1931)
- Monochroa rebeli (M. Hering, 1927)
- Neotelphusa cisti (Stainton, 1869)
- Nothris congressariella (Bruand, 1858)
- Ochrodia subdiminutella (Stainton, 1867)
- Ornativalva antipyramis (Meyrick, 1925)
- Ornativalva heluanensis (Debski, 1913)
- Ornativalva plutelliformis (Staudinger, 1859)
- Palumbina guerinii (Stainton, 1858)
- Phthorimaea operculella (Zeller, 1873)
- Platyedra subcinerea (Haworth, 1828)
- Pragmatodes fruticosella Walsingham, 1908
- Ptocheuusa guimarensis (Walsingham, 1908)
- Recurvaria cinerella Chretien, 1908
- Scrobipalpa bazae Povolny, 1977
- Scrobipalpa ergasima (Meyrick, 1916)
- Scrobipalpa halymella (Milliere, 1864)
- Scrobipalpa instabilella (Douglas, 1846)
- Scrobipalpa ocellatella (Boyd, 1858)
- Scrobipalpa traganella (Chretien, 1915)
- Scrobipalpa vasconiella (Rossler, 1877)
- Scrobipalpa vicaria (Meyrick, 1921)
- Scrobipalpa wiltshirei Povolny, 1966
- Sitotroga psacasta (Meyrick, 1908)
- Sitotroga cerealella (Olivier, 1789)
- Stomopteryx detersella (Zeller, 1847)
- Stomopteryx remissella (Zeller, 1847)
- Stomopteryx schizogynae (Walsingham, 1908)
- Streyella canariensis (Walsingham, 1908)
- Syncopacma genistae (Walsingham, 1908)
- Syncopacma polychromella (Rebel, 1902)
- Syncopacma thaumalea (Walsingham, 1905)
- Tecia solanivora (Povolny, 1973)
- Teleiopsis lunariella (Walsingham, 1908)
- Telphusa cistiflorella (Constant, 1890)

=== Geometridae ===
- Anticlea cabrerai (Pinker, 1962)
- Ascotis fortunata (Blachier, 1887)
- Aspitates collinaria (Holt-White, 1894)
- Charissa canariensis (Rebel, 1911)
- Chemerina caliginearia (Rambur, 1833)
- Chiasmia aestimaria (Hübner, 1809)
- Cleora fortunata Blachier, 1889
- Costaconvexa centrostrigaria (Wollaston, 1858)
- Crocallis bacalladoi Pinker, 1978
- Crocallis matillae Pinker, 1974
- Cyclophora maderensis (Bethune-Baker, 1891)
- Episauris kiliani Rebel, 1898
- Eumannia bytinskii (Wehrli, 1939)
- Eupithecia boryata (Rebel, 1906)
- Eupithecia gomerensis (Rebel, 1917)
- Eupithecia maspalomae Pinker, 1961
- Eupithecia massiliata Milliere, 1865
- Eupithecia orana Dietze, 1913
- Eupithecia pantellata Milliere, 1875
- Eupithecia phoeniceata (Rambur, 1834)
- Eupithecia pusillata (Denis & Schiffermuller, 1775)
- Eupithecia rosai Pinker, 1962
- Eupithecia schuetzeata Pinker, 1961
- Eupithecia semigraphata Bruand, 1850
- Eupithecia stertzi (Rebel, 1911)
- Eupithecia tenerifensis (Rebel, 1906)
- Eupithecia ultimaria Boisduval, 1840
- Eupithecia unedonata Mabille, 1868
- Gymnoscelis rufifasciata (Haworth, 1809)
- Herbulotina grandis (Prout, 1914)
- Idaea abnorma (Pinker, 1960)
- Idaea bacalladoi (Pinker, 1974)
- Idaea blaesii Lenz & Hausmann, 1992
- Idaea charitata (Rebel, 1914)
- Idaea fuerteventurensis (Pinker, 1974)
- Idaea inquinata (Scopoli, 1763)
- Idaea longaria (Herrich-Schäffer, 1852)
- Idaea neglecta Hausmann & Werno, 2003
- Idaea nigra Hausmann & Blasius, 2007
- Idaea palmata (Staudinger, 1901)
- Idaea purpurariata (Pinker, 1974)
- Idaea unicalcarata (Prout, 1922)
- Idaea vilaflorensis (Rebel, 1910)
- Idaea volloni (D. Lucas & de Joannis, 1907)
- Isturgia disputaria (Guenee, 1858)
- Isturgia pulinda (Walker, 1860)
- Isturgia tennoa (Pinker, 1978)
- Menophra canariensis (Rebel, 1917)
- Microloxia schmitzi Hausmann, 1995
- Microloxia simonyi (Rebel, 1894)
- Nebula ibericata (Staudinger, 1871)
- Nycterosea obstipata (Fabricius, 1794)
- Oar pratana (Fabricius, 1794)
- Phaiogramma faustinata (Milliere, 1868)
- Rhodometra sacraria (Linnaeus, 1767)
- Rhoptria asperaria (Hübner, 1817)
- Scopula asellaria (Herrich-Schäffer, 1847)
- Scopula guancharia (Alphéraky, 1889)
- Scopula imitaria (Hübner, 1799)
- Scopula minorata (Boisduval, 1833)
- Scopula submutata (Treitschke, 1828)
- Tephronia codetaria (Oberthur, 1881)
- Xanthorhoe ferrugata (Clerck, 1759)

=== Glyphipterigidae ===
- Acrolepiopsis vesperella (Zeller, 1850)
- Digitivalva pappella (Walsingham, 1908)
- Glyphipterix equitella (Scopoli, 1763)
- Glyphipterix fortunatella Walsingham, 1908
- Glyphipterix pygmaeella Rebel, 1896
- Glyphipterix umbilici M. Hering, 1927

=== Gracillariidae ===
- Aspilapteryx multipunctella Chretien, 1916
- Caloptilia aurantiaca (Wollaston, 1858)
- Caloptilia coruscans (Walsingham, 1907)
- Caloptilia laurifoliae (M. Hering, 1927)
- Caloptilia robustella Jackh, 1972
- Caloptilia staintoni (Wollaston, 1858)
- Dialectica hedemanni (Rebel, 1896)
- Dialectica scalariella (Zeller, 1850)
- Leucospilapteryx omissella (Stainton, 1848)
- Phyllocnistis canariensis M. Hering, 1927
- Phyllocnistis citrella Stainton, 1856
- Phyllonorycter bartolomella (Deschka, 1968)
- Phyllonorycter cytisella (Rebel, 1896)
- Phyllonorycter cytisifoliae (M. Hering, 1927)
- Phyllonorycter foliolosi Walsingham, 1908
- Phyllonorycter juncei (Walsingham, 1908)
- Phyllonorycter klimeschiella (Deschka, 1970)
- Phyllonorycter messaniella (Zeller, 1846)
- Phyllonorycter spartocytisi (M. Hering, 1927)

=== Nepticulidae ===
- Acalyptris staticis (Walsingham, 1908)
- Ectoedemia jubae (Walsingham, 1908)
- Ectoedemia nigrifasciata (Walsingham, 1908)
- Ectoedemia variicapitella (Chretien, 1908)
- Stigmella anomalella (Goeze, 1783)
- Stigmella aurella (Fabricius, 1775)
- Stigmella centifoliella (Zeller, 1848)
- Stigmella crenulatae (Klimesch, 1975)
- Stigmella xystodes (Meyrick, 1916)
- Trifurcula micromeriae (Walsingham, 1908)
- Trifurcula salicinae Klimesch, 1975
- Trifurcula sanctaecrucis (Walsingham, 1908)
- Trifurcula ridiculosa (Walsingham, 1908)

=== Noctuidae ===
- Abrostola canariensis Hampson, 1913
- Acontia biskrensis Oberthur, 1887
- Acontia lucida (Hufnagel, 1766)
- Acrobyla kneuckeri Rebel, 1903
- Actebia photophila (Guenee, 1852)
- Agrotis correlejoi Fibiger & Honey, 2004
- Agrotis fortunata Draudt, 1938
- Agrotis haifae Staudinger, 1897
- Agrotis herzogi Rebel, 1911
- Agrotis ipsilon (Hufnagel, 1766)
- Agrotis lanzarotensis Rebel, 1894
- Agrotis lasserrei (Oberthur, 1881)
- Agrotis puta (Hübner, 1803)
- Agrotis sardzeana Brandt, 1941
- Agrotis segetum (Denis & Schiffermuller, 1775)
- Agrotis spinifera (Hübner, 1808)
- Agrotis trux (Hübner, 1824)
- Anarta sodae (Rambur, 1829)
- Anarta trifolii (Hufnagel, 1766)
- Argyrogramma fracta (Walker, 1858)
- Argyrogramma signata (Fabricius, 1775)
- Armada panaceorum (Menetries, 1848)
- Autographa gamma (Linnaeus, 1758)
- Bryonycta opulenta Boursin, 1957
- Callopistria latreillei (Duponchel, 1827)
- Calophasia platyptera (Esper, 1788)
- Caradrina oberthuri (Rothschild, 1913)
- Caradrina flava Oberthur, 1876
- Caradrina rebeli Staudinger, 1901
- Cardepia affinis (Rothschild, 1913)
- Chrysodeixis acuta (Walker, 1858)
- Chrysodeixis chalcites (Esper, 1789)
- Cleonymia baetica (Rambur, 1837)
- Condica capensis (Walker, 1857)
- Condica viscosa (Freyer, 1831)
- Cornutiplusia circumflexa (Linnaeus, 1767)
- Cosmia affinis (Linnaeus, 1767)
- Ctenoplusia limbirena (Guenee, 1852)
- Ctenoplusia vittata (Wallengren, 1856)
- Cucullia calendulae Treitschke, 1835
- Cucullia syrtana Mabille, 1888
- Cucullia canariensis Pinker, 1968
- Euplexia euplexina Rebel, 1917
- Euxoa beatissima Rebel, 1913
- Euxoa canariensis Rebel, 1902
- Galgula partita Guenee, 1852
- Gerarctia poliotis Hampson, 1905
- Gortyna xanthenes Germar, 1842
- Hadena perplexa (Denis & Schiffermuller, 1775)
- Hadena sancta (Staudinger, 1859)
- Hadena nigricata Pinker, 1968
- Hadena silenides (Staudinger, 1895)
- Hecatera weissi (Draudt, 1934)
- Helicoverpa armigera (Hübner, 1808)
- Heliothis incarnata Freyer, 1838
- Heliothis nubigera Herrich-Schäffer, 1851
- Heliothis peltigera (Denis & Schiffermuller, 1775)
- Heliothis viriplaca (Hufnagel, 1766)
- Leucania loreyi (Duponchel, 1827)
- Leucania fortunata Pinker, 1961
- Leucania punctosa (Treitschke, 1825)
- Leucochlaena oditis (Hübner, 1822)
- Mesapamea pinkeri Bacallardo, 1973
- Metopoceras felicina (Donzel, 1844)
- Mniotype fratellum (Pinker, 1965)
- Mniotype schumacheri (Rebel, 1917)
- Mniotype usurpatrix (Rebel, 1914)
- Mythimna saucesa Pinker, 1963
- Mythimna vitellina (Hübner, 1808)
- Mythimna unipuncta (Haworth, 1809)
- Noctua noacki Boursin, 1957
- Noctua pronuba (Linnaeus, 1758)
- Nyctobrya canaria Alphéraky, 1889
- Nyctobrya simonyi Rogenhofer, 1889
- Oria musculosa (Hübner, 1808)
- Ozarba heliastis (Hampson, 1902)
- Paranataelia tenerifica (Hampson, 1906)
- Paranataelia whitei (Rebel, 1906)
- Peridroma saucia (Hübner, 1808)
- Phlogophora meticulosa (Linnaeus, 1758)
- Polymixis lichenea (Hübner, 1813)
- Polymixis bacheri (Pungeler, 1901)
- Polytela cliens (Felder & Rogenhofer, 1874)
- Scythocentropus inquinata (Mabille, 1888)
- Sesamia cretica Lederer, 1857
- Sesamia nonagrioides Lefebvre, 1827
- Spodoptera cilium Guenee, 1852
- Spodoptera exigua (Hübner, 1808)
- Spodoptera littoralis (Boisduval, 1833)
- Thalerastria diaphora (Staudinger, 1879)
- Thysanoplusia orichalcea (Fabricius, 1775)
- Trichoplusia ni (Hübner, 1803)
- Xestia c-nigrum (Linnaeus, 1758)
- Xestia mejiasi Pinker, 1961
- Xylena exsoleta (Linnaeus, 1758)

=== Nolidae ===
- Earias insulana (Boisduval, 1833)
- Garella nilotica (Rogenhofer, 1882)

=== Notodontidae ===
- Cerura delavoiei (Gaschet, 1876)

=== Oecophoridae ===
- Harpella forficella (Scopoli, 1763)

=== Plutellidae ===
- Plutella xylostella (Linnaeus, 1758)
- Rhigognostis annulatella (Curtis, 1832)

=== Praydidae ===
- Prays citri (Milliere, 1873)
- Prays friesei Klimesch, 1992
- Prays oleae (Bernard, 1788)
- Amicta cabrerai (Rebel, 1894)

=== Psychidae ===
- Luffia ferchaultella (Stephens, 1850)
- Luffia gomerensis Henderickx, 1996
- Luffia palmensis Sobczyk, 2002
- Luffia rebeli Walsingham, 1908

=== Pterophoridae ===
- Agdistis bifurcatus Agenjo, 1952
- Agdistis frankeniae (Zeller, 1847)
- Agdistis heydeni (Zeller, 1852)
- Agdistis meridionalis (Zeller, 1847)
- Agdistis pseudocanariensis Arenberger, 1973
- Agdistis salsolae Walsingham, 1908
- Agdistis satanas Milliere, 1875
- Agdistis tamaricis (Zeller, 1847)
- Amblyptilia acanthadactyla (Hübner, 1813)
- Crombrugghia distans (Zeller, 1847)
- Crombrugghia laetus (Zeller, 1847)
- Emmelina monodactyla (Linnaeus, 1758)
- Hellinsia inulae (Zeller, 1852)
- Hellinsia pectodactylus (Staudinger, 1859)
- Lantanophaga pusillidactylus (Walker, 1864)
- Merrifieldia bystropogonis (Walsingham, 1908)
- Merrifieldia chordodactylus (Staudinger, 1859)
- Merrifieldia hedemanni (Rebel, 1896)
- Merrifieldia malacodactylus (Zeller, 1847)
- Merrifieldia particiliata (Walsingham, 1908)
- Oxyptilus parvidactyla (Haworth, 1811)
- Puerphorus olbiadactylus (Milliere, 1859)
- Stangeia siceliota (Zeller, 1847)
- Stenoptilia bipunctidactyla (Scopoli, 1763)
- Stenoptilodes taprobanes (Felder & Rogenhofer, 1875)
- Tabulaephorus punctinervis (Constant, 1885)

=== Pyralidae ===
- Acrobasis klimeschi Roesler, 1978
- Acrobasis obliqua (Zeller, 1847)
- Aglossa caprealis (Hübner, 1809)
- Aglossa pinguinalis (Linnaeus, 1758)
- Ambluncus nervosellus Meyrick, 1934
- Ancylodes dealbatella (Erschoff, 1874)
- Ancylodes pallens Ragonot, 1887
- Ancylosis arenosella (Staudinger, 1859)
- Ancylosis biflexella (Lederer, 1855)
- Ancylosis convexella (Lederer, 1855)
- Ancylosis costistrigella (Ragonot, 1890)
- Ancylosis faustinella (Zeller, 1867)
- Ancylosis gracilella Ragonot, 1887
- Ancylosis harmoniella (Ragonot, 1887)
- Ancylosis imitella Hampson, 1901
- Ancylosis nubeculella (Ragonot, 1887)
- Ancylosis oblitella (Zeller, 1848)
- Ancylosis roscidella (Eversmann, 1844)
- Ancylosis samaritanella (Zeller, 1867)
- Ancylosis yerburii (Butler, 1884)
- Aphomia sociella (Linnaeus, 1758)
- Apomyelois ceratoniae (Zeller, 1839)
- Archigalleria proavitella (Rebel, 1892)
- Arsissa atlantica Asselbergs, 2009
- Bazaria gilvella (Ragonot, 1887)
- Bazaria venosella Asselbergs, 2009
- Bostra obsoletalis (Mann, 1884)
- Bradyrrhoa trapezella (Duponchel, 1836)
- Cadra calidella (Guenee, 1845)
- Cadra cautella (Walker, 1863)
- Cadra figulilella (Gregson, 1871)
- Caina deletella Ragonot, 1893
- Cathayia insularum (Speidel & Schmitz, 1991)
- Cherchera abatesella Dumont, 1932
- Cryptoblabes gnidiella (Milliere, 1867)
- Denticera divisella (Duponchel, 1842)
- Dioryctria nivaliensis Rebel, 1892
- Endotricha rogenhoferi Rebel, 1892
- Ephestia disparella Hampson, 1901
- Ephestia elutella (Hübner, 1796)
- Ephestia kuehniella Zeller, 1879
- Epischnia hesperidella Rebel, 1917
- Etiella zinckenella (Treitschke, 1832)
- Euzopherodes vapidella (Mann, 1857)
- Faveria dionysia (Zeller, 1846)
- Galleria mellonella (Linnaeus, 1758)
- Hansreisseria gilvescens (Rebel, 1917)
- Homoeosoma nimbella (Duponchel, 1837)
- Hypotia corticalis (Denis & Schiffermuller, 1775)
- Hypotia infulalis Lederer, 1858
- Hypotia muscosalis (Rebel, 1917)
- Hypotia myalis (Rothschild, 1913)
- Hypotia pectinalis (Herrich-Schäffer, 1838)
- Isauria dilucidella (Duponchel, 1836)
- Laetilia loxogramma (Staudinger, 1870)
- Lamoria anella (Denis & Schiffermuller, 1775)
- Merulempista turturella (Zeller, 1848)
- Nephopterygia austeritella Amsel, 1965
- Oxybia transversella (Duponchel, 1836)
- Pararotruda nesiotica (Rebel, 1911)
- Pempelia brephiella (Staudinger, 1879)
- Pempeliella ardosiella (Ragonot, 1887)
- Phycita diaphana (Staudinger, 1870)
- Phycitodes albatella (Ragonot, 1887)
- Phycitodes inquinatella (Ragonot, 1887)
- Phycitodes lacteella (Rothschild, 1915)
- Phycitodes saxicola (Vaughan, 1870)
- Plodia interpunctella (Hübner, 1813)
- Psorosa mediterranella Amsel, 1953
- Pyralis farinalis (Linnaeus, 1758)
- Pyralis manihotalis Guenee, 1854
- Raphimetopus ablutella (Zeller, 1839)
- Staudingeria brunneella Chrétien, 1911
- Thylacoptila paurosema Meyrick, 1888

=== Scythrididae ===
- Scythris arachnodes Walsingham, 1908
- Scythris boseanella Klimesch, 1986
- Scythris fasciatella (Ragonot, 1880)
- Scythris guimarensis Bengtsson, 1997
- Scythris hierroella Klimesch, 1986
- Scythris klimeschi Bengtsson, 1997
- Scythris petrella Walsingham, 1908
- Scythris pinkeri Klimesch, 1986
- Scythris polycarpaeae Klimesch, 1986
- Scythris pseudoarachnodes Bengtsson, 1997

=== Sesiidae ===
- Bembecia handiensis Ramisch, 1997
- Bembecia vulcanica (Pinker, 1969)

=== Sphingidae ===
- Acherontia atropos (Linnaeus, 1758)
- Agrius convolvuli (Linnaeus, 1758)
- Hippotion celerio (Linnaeus, 1758)
- Hyles livornica (Esper, 1780)
- Hyles tithymali (Boisduval, 1834)
- Macroglossum stellatarum (Linnaeus, 1758)

=== Stathmopodidae ===
- Neomariania rebeli (Walsingham, 1894)

=== Tineidae ===
- Amphixystis undosa (Walsingham, 1908)
- Ateliotum insulare (Rebel, 1896)
- Ateliotum petrinella (Herrich-Schäffer, 1854)
- Cephimallota crassiflavella Bruand, 1851
- Haplotinea insectella (Fabricius, 1794)
- Infurcitinea toechophila (Walsingham, 1908)
- Metatinea immaculatella (Rebel, 1892)
- Monopis crocicapitella (Clemens, 1859)
- Monopis imella (Hübner, 1813)
- Monopis nigricantella (Milliere, 1872)
- Myrmecozela ataxella (Chretien, 1905)
- Nemapogon palmella (Chretien, 1908)
- Niditinea fuscella (Linnaeus, 1758)
- Oinophila nesiotes Walsingham, 1908
- Oinophila v-flava (Haworth, 1828)
- Opogona sacchari (Bojer, 1856)
- Phereoeca allutella (Rebel, 1892)
- Praeacedes atomosella (Walker, 1863)
- Proterospastis merdella (Zeller, 1847)
- Rhodobates canariensis Petersen & Gaedike, 1979
- Rhodobates pinkeri Petersen, 1987
- Setomorpha rutella Zeller, 1852
- Stathmopolitis tragocoprella Walsingham, 1908
- Stenoptinea cyaneimarmorella (Milliere, 1854)
- Tenaga nigripunctella (Haworth, 1828)
- Tinea basifasciella Ragonot, 1895
- Tinea dubiella Stainton, 1859
- Tinea messalina Robinson, 1979
- Tinea murariella Staudinger, 1859
- Tinea pellionella Linnaeus, 1758
- Tinea trinotella Thunberg, 1794
- Tineola bisselliella (Hummel, 1823)
- Trichophaga bipartitella (Ragonot, 1892)
- Trichophaga robinsoni Gaedike & Karsholt, 2001
- Trichophaga tapetzella (Linnaeus, 1758)
- Wegneria panchalcella (Staudinger, 1871)

=== Tischeriidae ===
- Coptotriche longiciliatella (Rebel, 1896)
- Coptotriche tantalella (Walsingham, 1908)

=== Tortricidae ===
- Acroclita guanchana Walsingham, 1908
- Acroclita klimeschi Diakonoff, 1985
- Acroclita sonchana Walsingham, 1908
- Acroclita subsequana (Herrich-Schäffer, 1851)
- Aethes bilbaensis (Rossler, 1877)
- Aethes conversana (Walsingham, 1908)
- Aethes francillana (Fabricius, 1794)
- Avaria constanti (Rebel, 1894)
- Avaria hyerana (Milliere, 1858)
- Bactra bactrana (Kennel, 1901)
- Bactra lancealana (Hübner, 1799)
- Bactra venosana (Zeller, 1847)
- Bactra legitima Meyrick, 1911
- Bactra minima Meyrick, 1909
- Choristoneura bracatana (Rebel, 1894)
- Choristoneura simonyi (Rebel, 1892)
- Clavigesta sylvestrana (Curtis, 1850)
- Clepsis canariensis (Rebel, 1896)
- Clepsis coriacanus (Rebel, 1894)
- Cnephasia asseclana (Denis & Schiffermuller, 1775)
- Cnephasia fragosana (Zeller, 1847)
- Cnephasia longana (Haworth, 1811)
- Cnephasia nesiotica Razowski, 1983
- Cochylimorpha decolorella (Zeller, 1839)
- Cochylimorpha straminea (Haworth, 1811)
- Cochylis epilinana Duponchel, 1842
- Crocidosema plebejana Zeller, 1847
- Cydia alazon (Diakonoff, 1976)
- Cydia atlantica Chambon & Ferot, 1985
- Cydia canariensis (Kuznetsov, 1972)
- Cydia duplicana (Zetterstedt, 1839)
- Cydia elpore (Diakonoff, 1976)
- Cydia negatana (Rebel, 1896)
- Cydia pomonella (Linnaeus, 1758)
- Diceratura roseofasciana (Mann, 1855)
- Endothenia pauperculana (Staudinger, 1859)
- Epinotia thapsiana (Zeller, 1847)
- Eupoecilia sanguisorbana (Herrich-Schäffer, 1856)
- Lobesia neptunia (Walsingham, 1908)
- Phtheochroa ecballiella Huemer, 1990
- Phtheochroa syrtana Ragonot, 1888
- Rhyacionia walsinghami (Rebel, 1896)
- Selania leplastriana (Curtis, 1831)
- Selania macella Diakonoff, 1976
- Spilonota ocellana (Denis & Schiffermuller, 1775)
- Strepsicrates fenestrata Walsingham, 1908
- Strepsicrates trimaura Diakonoff, 1985
- Thiodia glandulosana Walsingham, 1908

=== Yponomeutidae ===
- Yponomeuta gigas Rebel, 1892
- Yponomeuta padella (Linnaeus, 1758)
- Zelleria oleastrella (Milliere, 1864)
- Zelleria wolffi Klimesch, 1983
