= Caina =

Caina may refer to:

- Caina (moth), a genus of moth
- Caina Township, Qüxü County, Tibet Autonomous Region, China
- A section of the Cocytus in Dante's Divine Comedy
