= Parexarnis =

Scientific classification
- Domain: Eukaryota
- Kingdom: Animalia
- Phylum: Arthropoda
- Class: Insecta
- Order: Lepidoptera
- Superfamily: Noctuoidea
- Family: Noctuidae
- Subfamily: Noctuinae
- Genus: Parexarnis; Boursin, 1946

Genus of moths

Parexarnis is a genus of moths of the family Noctuidae. Some authors consider it to be a subgenus of Actebia.

== Species ==
- Parexarnis fugax (Treitschke, 1825)
- Parexarnis photophila (Guenée, 1852)
- Parexarnis sollers (Christoph, 1877)
