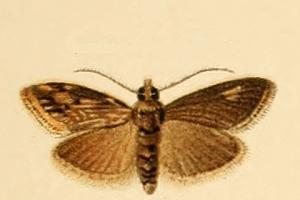

Scientific classification
- Domain: Eukaryota
- Kingdom: Animalia
- Phylum: Arthropoda
- Class: Insecta
- Order: Lepidoptera
- Family: Crambidae
- Tribe: Odontiini
- Genus: Dentifovea; Amsel, 1970

= Dentifovea =

Genus of moths

Dentifovea is a genus of moths of the family Crambidae.

== Species ==
- Dentifovea fulvifascialis (Christoph, 1887)
- Dentifovea praecultalis (Rebel, 1896)
