= Chersogenes enigmatica =

Scientific classification
- Kingdom: Animalia
- Phylum: Arthropoda
- Clade: Pancrustacea
- Class: Insecta
- Order: Lepidoptera
- Family: Autostichidae
- Genus: Chersogenes
- Species: C. enigmatica

Binomial name
- Chersogenes enigmatica (Gozmány, 1964)

Synonyms
- Epanastasis enigmatica Gozmány, 1964

Species of moth

Chersogenes enigmatica is a species of moth in the family Autostichidae. It was described by László Anthony Gozmány in 1964. It is found in Algeria.
