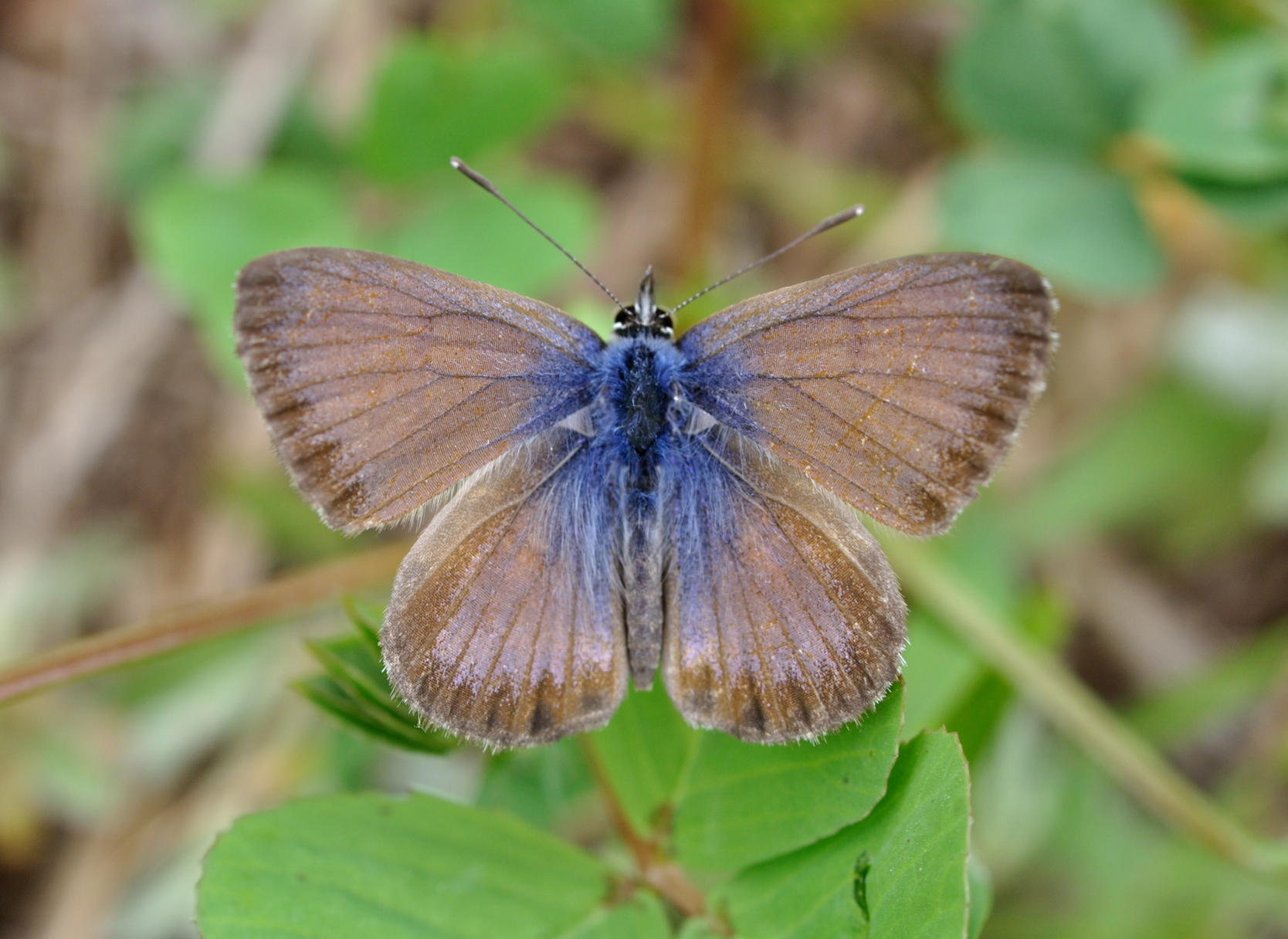

Conservation status
- Near Threatened (IUCN 3.1)

Scientific classification
- Kingdom: Animalia
- Phylum: Arthropoda
- Clade: Pancrustacea
- Class: Insecta
- Order: Lepidoptera
- Family: Lycaenidae
- Genus: Leptotes
- Species: L. webbianus

Binomial name
- Leptotes webbianus (Brullé, [1840])

Synonyms
- Polyommatus webbianus Brullé, [1840]; Cyclyrius webbianus (Brullé, [1840]); Cyclirius webbianus (misspelling)

= Leptotes webbianus =

Species of butterfly

Leptotes webbianus (formerly Cyclyrius webbianus), the Canary blue, is a butterfly in the family Lycaenidae. It is endemic to the Canary Islands.

The wingspan is 28–34 mm. Adults are on wing year round. The habitat consists of coastal areas. The species flies from March to August on heights of up to 3,000 metres (9,800 ft).

The larvae feed on Lotus, Cytisus and Ononis species.

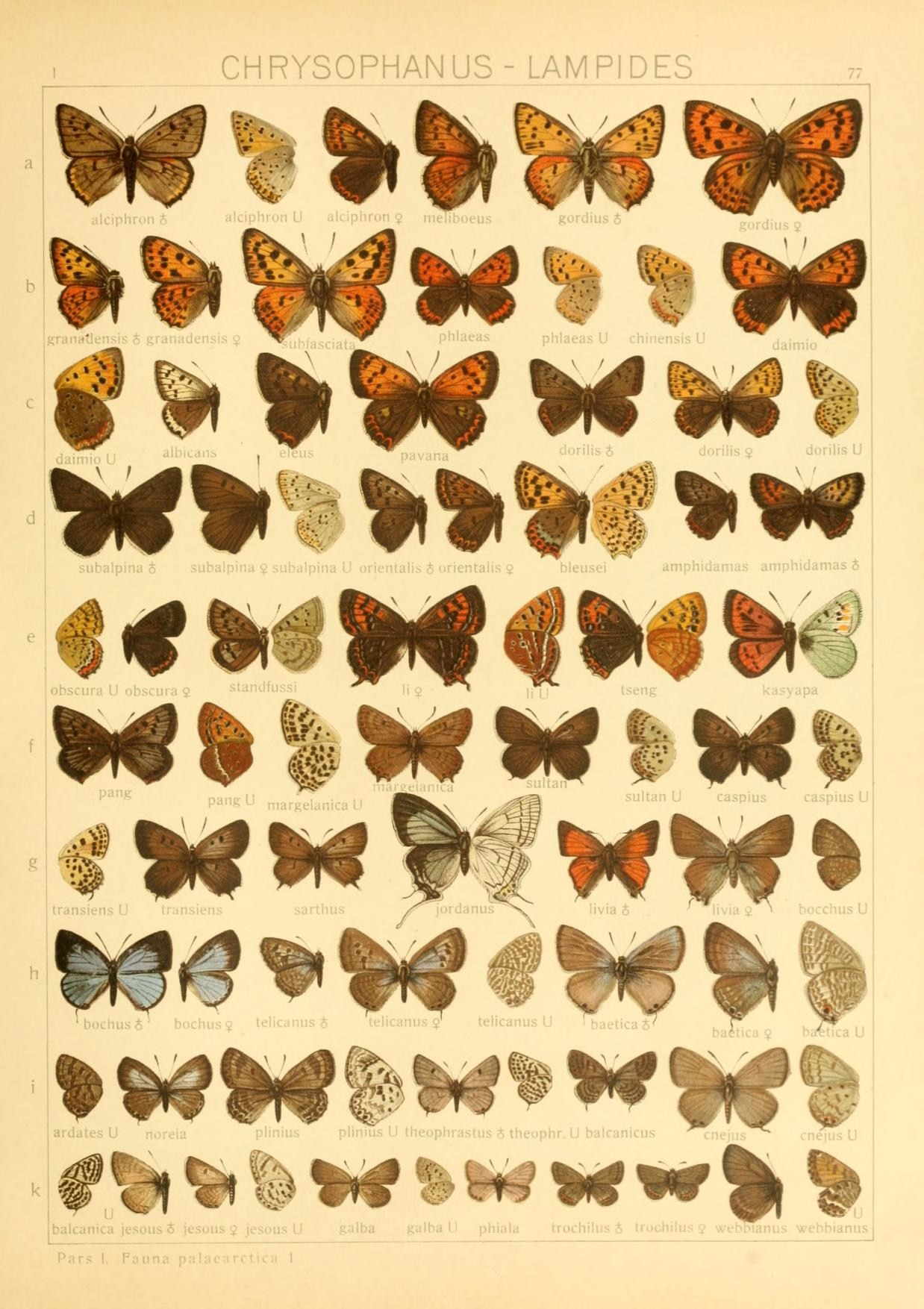
Seitz 77k

== Description from Seitz ==
P. webbianus Brulle (— fortunata Stgr.) (77 k). Both sexes quite dark brown above with dull blue gloss. At once recognized by the variegated underside; disc of forewing beneath yellowish brown, with white spots before the apex; the hindwing dark grey-brown with light striation and an irregular white band; fringes spotted. — Only on the Canary Islands. Larva said to feed on the flowers of Cytisus canariensis and C. nubigenus. The butterflies fly at a considerable altitude on the Pic of Teneriffe, locally very plentiful, but also in the plains, where they are met with more singly. Simony still found them high up in a locality without vegetation where they were sitting on the blocks of lava. They are apparently on the wing throughout the year, being especially common in August, flying about the branches of Tamarisk and visiting the flowers of Adenocarpus viscosus. I obtained a specimen at Orotava in the immediate neighbourhood of the old dragon-tree, which was then still standing.
