= Chersogenes arenbergerorum =

Scientific classification
- Kingdom: Animalia
- Phylum: Arthropoda
- Clade: Pancrustacea
- Class: Insecta
- Order: Lepidoptera
- Family: Autostichidae
- Genus: Chersogenes
- Species: C. arenbergerorum

Binomial name
- Chersogenes arenbergerorum (Gozmány, 1988)

Synonyms
- Epanastasis arenbergerorum Gozmány, 1988; Epanastasis arenberorum Gozmány, 1988 [lapsus]

Species of moth

Chersogenes arenbergerorum is a species of moth in the family Autostichidae. It was described by László Anthony Gozmány in 1988. It is found in Tunisia.
