= Ishnophanes bifucata =

Scientific classification
- Kingdom: Animalia
- Phylum: Arthropoda
- Clade: Pancrustacea
- Class: Insecta
- Order: Lepidoptera
- Family: Coleophoridae
- Genus: Ischnophanes
- Species: I. bifucata

Binomial name
- Ischnophanes bifucata Baldizzone, 1994

Species of moth

Ishnophanes bifucata is a moth of the family Coleophoridae. It is found in Iran, Turkmenistan, Tajikistan and Yemen.
