= Caina micrella =

Scientific classification
- Domain: Eukaryota
- Kingdom: Animalia
- Phylum: Arthropoda
- Class: Insecta
- Order: Lepidoptera
- Family: Pyralidae
- Genus: Caina
- Species: C. micrella

Binomial name
- Caina micrella Ragonot, 1893

Species of moth

Caina micrella is a species of snout moth described by Émile Louis Ragonot in 1893. It is found in North Africa, including Algeria.
