= Ischnophanes =

Scientific classification
- Kingdom: Animalia
- Phylum: Arthropoda
- Class: Insecta
- Order: Lepidoptera
- Family: Coleophoridae
- Genus: Ischnophanes; Meyrick, 1891

Genus of moths

Ischnophanes is a genus of moths of the family Coleophoridae.

== Species ==
- Ischnophanes aquilina Baldizzone & van der Wolf, 2003
- Ischnophanes baldizzonella Vives, 1983
- Ischnophanes bifurcata Baldizzone, 1994
- Ischnophanes canariella Baldizzone, 1984
- Ischnophanes excentra Baldizzone & van der Wolf, 2003
- Ischnophanes monocentra Meyrick, 1891
