= Chersogenes atlanticella =

Scientific classification
- Kingdom: Animalia
- Phylum: Arthropoda
- Class: Insecta
- Order: Lepidoptera
- Family: Autostichidae
- Genus: Chersogenes
- Species: C. atlanticella

Binomial name
- Chersogenes atlanticella (Lucas, 1937)

Synonyms
- Epanastasis atlanticella (Lucas, 1937); Symmoca atlanticella Lucas, 1937; Symmoca vetustella Zerny, 1936

Species of moth

Chersogenes atlanticella is a species of moth in the family Autostichidae. It was described by Daniel Lucas in 1937. It is found in Morocco.
