= Ischnophanes baldizzonella =

Scientific classification
- Domain: Eukaryota
- Kingdom: Animalia
- Phylum: Arthropoda
- Class: Insecta
- Order: Lepidoptera
- Family: Coleophoridae
- Genus: Ischnophanes
- Species: I. baldizzonella

Binomial name
- Ischnophanes baldizzonella Vives, 1983

Species of moth

Ischnophanes baldizzonella is a moth of the family Coleophoridae. It is found in Spain.
