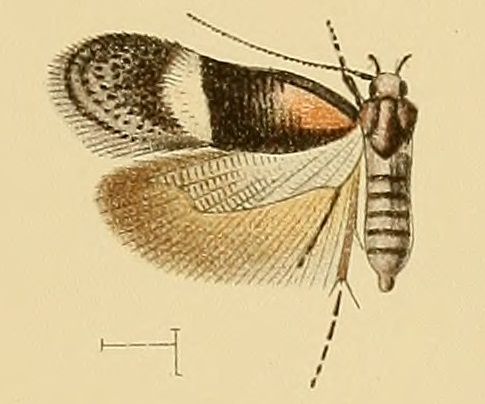

Scientific classification
- Domain: Eukaryota
- Kingdom: Animalia
- Phylum: Arthropoda
- Class: Insecta
- Order: Lepidoptera
- Family: Gelechiidae
- Genus: Syncopacma
- Species: S. genistae

Binomial name
- Syncopacma genistae (Walsingham, 1908)

Synonyms
- Aproaerema genistae Walsingham, 1908

= Syncopacma genistae =

Species of moth

Syncopacma genistae is a moth of the family Gelechiidae. It is found on the Canary Islands.

The wingspan is about 8 mm.

The larvae feed within the shoots of Genista canariensis.
