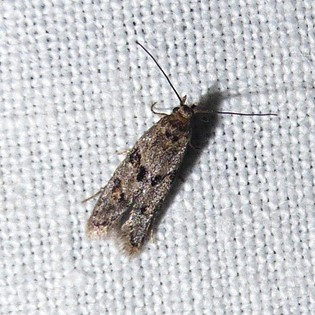

Scientific classification
- Kingdom: Animalia
- Phylum: Arthropoda
- Clade: Pancrustacea
- Class: Insecta
- Order: Lepidoptera
- Family: Autostichidae
- Genus: Chersogenes; Walsingham, 1908

Synonyms
- Ambloma Walsingham, 1908; Epanastasis Walsingham, 1908; Thanatovena Gozmány, 1957

= Chersogenes =

Genus of moths

Chersogenes is a genus of moths in the family Autostichidae.

== Species ==
The following species are recognised in the genus Chersogenes:

- Chersogenes aguiari Falck & Karsholt, 2023
- Chersogenes arenbergerorum (Gozmány, 1988)
- Chersogenes atlanticella (Lucas, 1937)
- Chersogenes brachyptera (Walsingham, 1908)
- Chersogenes canariensis (Rebel, 1906)
- Chersogenes coxi Falck & Karsholt, 2023
- Chersogenes duabusalis Falck & Karsholt, 2023
- Chersogenes enigmatica (Gozmány, 1964)
- Chersogenes eupracta (Gozmány, 1988)
- Chersogenes extricata (Gozmány, 1964)
- Chersogenes friedeli (Gozmány, 1988)
- Chersogenes fuerteventurae Falck & Karsholt, 2023
- Chersogenes gomerae Falck & Karsholt, 2023
- Chersogenes gredoensis (Rebel, 1937)
- Chersogenes hermiguae Falck & Karsholt, 2023
- Chersogenes indistincta Falck & Karsholt, 2023
- Chersogenes klimeschi (Gozmány, 1975)
- Chersogenes lanzarotae Falck & Karsholt, 2023
- Chersogenes mercedella Falck & Karsholt, 2023
- Chersogenes nigra Falck & Karsholt, 2023
- Chersogenes pseudocanariensis Falck & Karsholt, 2023
- Chersogenes sophroniellus (Rebel, 1894)
- Chersogenes subextricata Falck & Karsholt, 2023
- Chersogenes tunesica (Gozmány, 1988)
- Chersogenes variabilis Falck & Karsholt, 2023
- Chersogenes victimella Walsingham, 1908
