= Scythris pseudarachnodes =

Scientific classification
- Kingdom: Animalia
- Phylum: Arthropoda
- Clade: Pancrustacea
- Class: Insecta
- Order: Lepidoptera
- Family: Scythrididae
- Genus: Scythris
- Species: S. pseudarachnodes

Binomial name
- Scythris pseudarachnodes Bengtsson, 1997

Synonyms
- Scythris pseudoarachnodes

Species of moth

Scythris pseudarachnodes is a moth of the family Scythrididae. It was described by Bengt Å. Bengtsson in 1997. It is found on the Canary Islands (Tenerife).

== Etymology ==
The species name refers to the similar species Scythris arachnodes plus Latin pseudo (meaning false).
