= Phyllonorycter cytisella =

Scientific classification
- Domain: Eukaryota
- Kingdom: Animalia
- Phylum: Arthropoda
- Class: Insecta
- Order: Lepidoptera
- Family: Gracillariidae
- Genus: Phyllonorycter
- Species: P. cytisella

Binomial name
- Phyllonorycter cytisella (Rebel, 1896)

Synonyms
- Lithocolletis cytisella Rebel, 1896

Species of moth

Phyllonorycter cytisella is a moth of the family Gracillariidae. It is endemic to the Canary Islands and is known from Gran Canaria, La Palma, and Tenerife.

== Ecology ==
The larvae feed on Chamaecytisus palmensis and Chamaecytisus proliferus. They mine the leaves of their host plant. Pupation takes place inside the mine.
