= Eupithecia tenerifensis =

Scientific classification
- Domain: Eukaryota
- Kingdom: Animalia
- Phylum: Arthropoda
- Class: Insecta
- Order: Lepidoptera
- Family: Geometridae
- Genus: Eupithecia
- Species: E. tenerifensis

Binomial name
- Eupithecia tenerifensis (Rebel, 1906)

Synonyms
- Tephroclystia tenerifensis Rebel, 1906

Species of moth

Eupithecia tenerifensis is a moth in the family Geometridae. It is endemic to the Canary Islands.

The wingspan is 20–22 mm. Adults are on wing year round.

The larvae feed on herbaceous plants, including Rumex lunaria and Rumex maderensis. Larvae can be found year-round.
