= Ischnophanes monocentra =

Scientific classification
- Domain: Eukaryota
- Kingdom: Animalia
- Phylum: Arthropoda
- Class: Insecta
- Order: Lepidoptera
- Family: Coleophoridae
- Genus: Ischnophanes
- Species: I. monocentra

Binomial name
- Ischnophanes monocentra Meyrick, 1891

Species of moth

Ischnophanes monocentra is a moth of the family Coleophoridae. It is found in Algeria and Tunisia.
