= Ischnophanes aquilina =

Scientific classification
- Kingdom: Animalia
- Phylum: Arthropoda
- Clade: Pancrustacea
- Class: Insecta
- Order: Lepidoptera
- Family: Coleophoridae
- Genus: Ischnophanes
- Species: I. aquilina

Binomial name
- Ischnophanes aquilina Baldizzone & van der Wolf, 2003

Species of moth

Ischnophanes aquilina is a moth of the family Coleophoridae. It is found in Spain.
