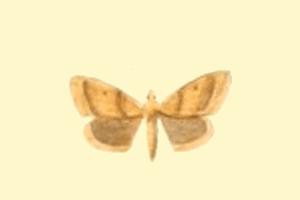

Scientific classification
- Kingdom: Animalia
- Phylum: Arthropoda
- Clade: Pancrustacea
- Class: Insecta
- Order: Lepidoptera
- Family: Crambidae
- Genus: Dentifovea
- Species: D. fulvifascialis

Binomial name
- Dentifovea fulvifascialis (Christoph, 1887)

Synonyms
- Hellula fulvifascialis Christoph, 1887; Phlyctaenodes foviferalis Hampson, 1900

= Dentifovea fulvifascialis =

Species of moth

Dentifovea fulvifascialis is a species of moth in the family Crambidae. It is found in Greece, Lebanon, Israel and India. The larvae feed Heliotropium rotundfolium and probably other Heliotropium species. They mine the leaves of their host plant. Larvae can be found in May.
