= Eupithecia maspalomae =

Scientific classification
- Domain: Eukaryota
- Kingdom: Animalia
- Phylum: Arthropoda
- Class: Insecta
- Order: Lepidoptera
- Family: Geometridae
- Genus: Eupithecia
- Species: E. maspalomae

Binomial name
- Eupithecia maspalomae Pinker, 1961

Species of moth

Eupithecia maspalomae is a moth in the family Geometridae. It is found on the Canary Islands.

The wingspan is about 17–18 mm.

== Taxonomy ==
It was previously placed as a synonym of Eupithecia orana.
