= Phyllonorycter bartolomella =

Scientific classification
- Kingdom: Animalia
- Phylum: Arthropoda
- Class: Insecta
- Order: Lepidoptera
- Family: Gracillariidae
- Genus: Phyllonorycter
- Species: P. bartolomella

Binomial name
- Phyllonorycter bartolomella (Deschka, 1968)

Synonyms
- Lithocolletis bartolomella Deschka, 1968

Species of moth

Phyllonorycter bartolomella is a moth of the family Gracillariidae. It is endemic to the Canary Islands and is known from Gran Canaria and Tenerife.

== Ecology ==
The larvae feed on Teline canariensis. They mine the leaves of their host plant.
