= Pragmatodes =

Scientific classification
- Domain: Eukaryota
- Kingdom: Animalia
- Phylum: Arthropoda
- Class: Insecta
- Order: Lepidoptera
- Family: Gelechiidae
- Tribe: Litini
- Genus: Pragmatodes; Walsingham, 1908

Species
- See text

Genus of moths

Pragmatodes is a genus of moths in the family Gelechiidae.

== Species ==
- Pragmatodes albagonella (Varenne & Nel, 2010)
- Pragmatodes cyrneogonella (Nel & Varenne, 2012)
- Pragmatodes fruticosella Walsingham, 1908
- Pragmatodes melagonella (Constant, 1895)
