= Chersogenes friedeli =

Scientific classification
- Kingdom: Animalia
- Phylum: Arthropoda
- Clade: Pancrustacea
- Class: Insecta
- Order: Lepidoptera
- Family: Autostichidae
- Genus: Chersogenes
- Species: C. friedeli

Binomial name
- Chersogenes friedeli (Gozmány, 1988)

Synonyms
- Epanastis friedeli Gozmány, 1988; Epanastasis friedeli Gozmány, 1988

Species of moth

Chersogenes friedeli is a species of moth in the family Autostichidae. It was described by László Anthony Gozmány in 1988. It is found in Morocco.
