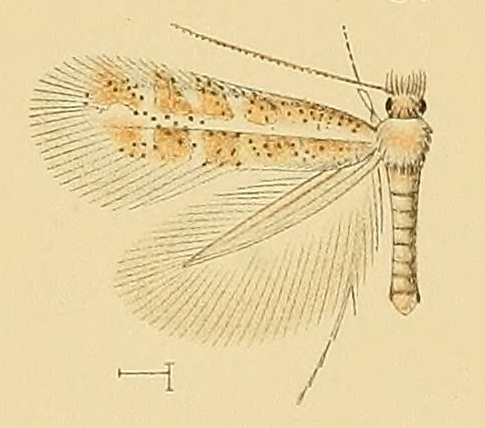

Scientific classification
- Domain: Eukaryota
- Kingdom: Animalia
- Phylum: Arthropoda
- Class: Insecta
- Order: Lepidoptera
- Family: Gracillariidae
- Genus: Phyllonorycter
- Species: P. foliolosi

Binomial name
- Phyllonorycter foliolosi Walsingham, 1908

Synonyms
- Lithocolletis foliolosi (Walsingham, 1908)

= Phyllonorycter foliolosi =

Species of moth

Phyllonorycter foliolosi is a moth of the family Gracillariidae. It is endemic to the Canary Islands and is known from La Palma and Tenerife.

== Ecology ==
The larvae feed on Adenocarpus viscosus, Adenocarpus complicatus aureus, Adenocarpus foliolosus, and Teline canariensis.
