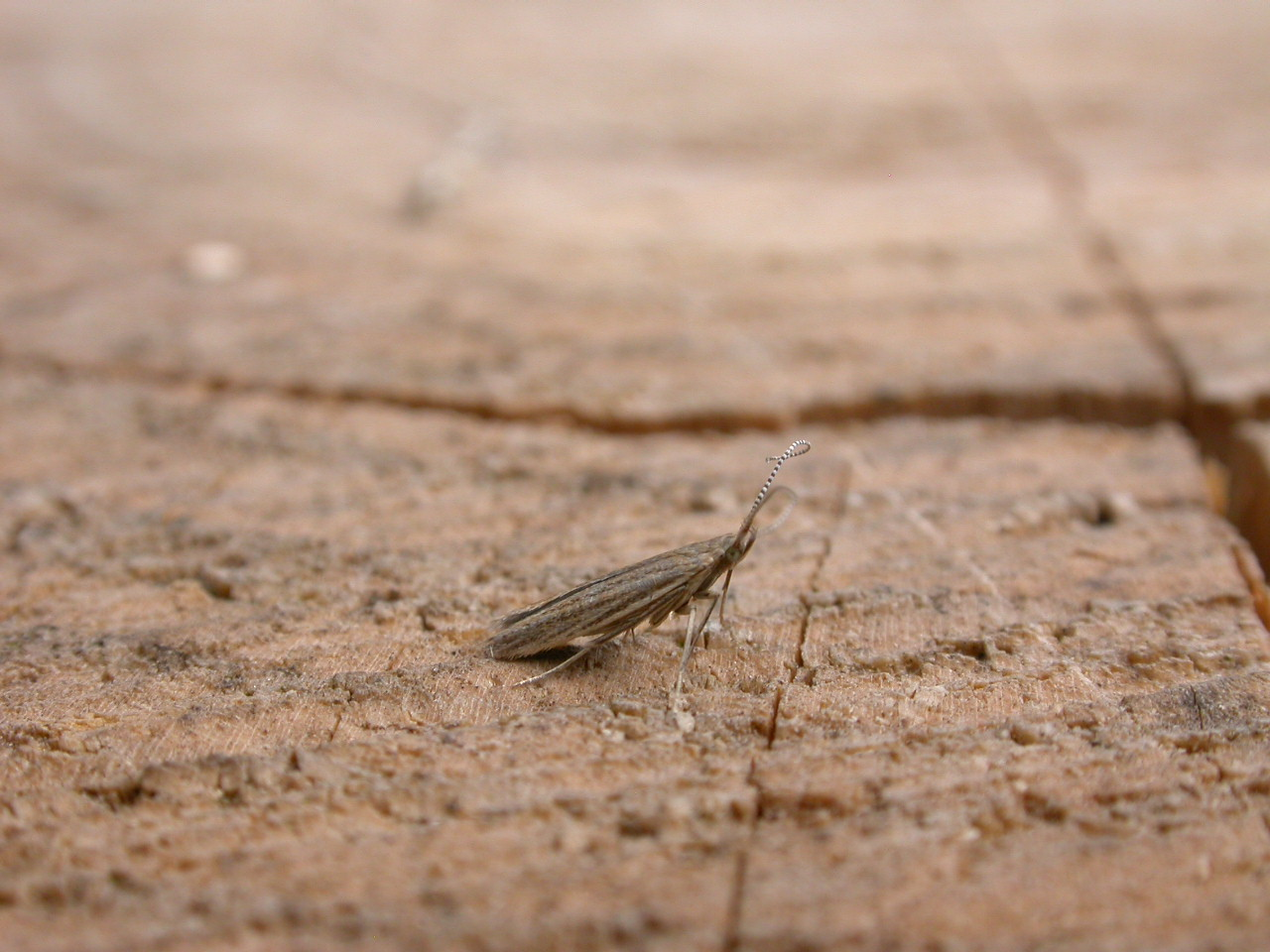

Scientific classification
- Kingdom: Animalia
- Phylum: Arthropoda
- Clade: Pancrustacea
- Class: Insecta
- Order: Lepidoptera
- Family: Coleophoridae
- Genus: Coleophora
- Species: C. granulatella

Binomial name
- Coleophora granulatella Zeller, 1849

Synonyms
- Coleophora artemisiae Muhlig, 1864

= Coleophora granulatella =

Species of moth

Coleophora granulatella is a moth of the family Coleophoridae. It is known from most of Europe to China. It was recently reported from North America, with records from Alberta, British Columbia, Yukon, Arizona, Colorado, Michigan, Wyoming, and Washington.

The wingspan is 11–13 mm.

The larvae feed on Artemisia campestris. They mine the leaves of their host plant.
