= Scrobipalpa bazae =

Scientific classification
- Kingdom: Animalia
- Phylum: Arthropoda
- Clade: Pancrustacea
- Class: Insecta
- Order: Lepidoptera
- Family: Gelechiidae
- Genus: Scrobipalpa
- Species: S. bazae

Binomial name
- Scrobipalpa bazae Povolný, 1977

Species of moth

Scrobipalpa bazae is a moth in the family Gelechiidae. It was described by Povolný in 1977. It is found on the Canary Islands and in Spain and southern France.

The length of the forewings is 4–5 mm (0.16–0.20 in).
