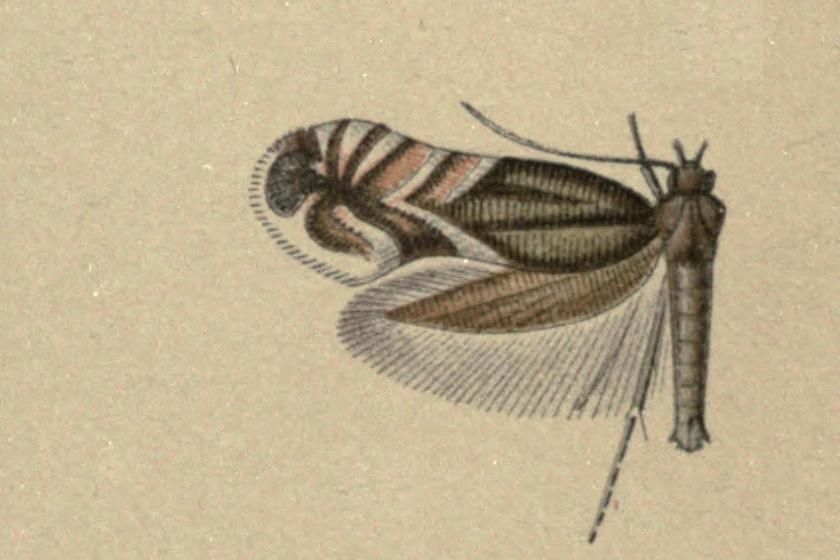

Scientific classification
- Kingdom: Animalia
- Phylum: Arthropoda
- Clade: Pancrustacea
- Class: Insecta
- Order: Lepidoptera
- Family: Glyphipterigidae
- Genus: Glyphipterix
- Species: G. fortunatella

Binomial name
- Glyphipterix fortunatella Walsingham, 1908

= Glyphipterix fortunatella =

Species of moth

Glyphipterix fortunatella is a moth of the family Glyphipterigidae. It is found on the Canary Islands.

The wingspan is 6-6.5 mm. The forewings are bronzy fuscous, blending to brownish cupreous beyond the middle. The hindwings are bronzy grey.
