= Coleophora albidorsella =

Scientific classification
- Kingdom: Animalia
- Phylum: Arthropoda
- Class: Insecta
- Order: Lepidoptera
- Family: Coleophoridae
- Genus: Coleophora
- Species: C. albidorsella

Binomial name
- Coleophora albidorsella Toll, 1942

Species of moth

Coleophora albidorsella is a moth of the family Coleophoridae. It is found in Iran, the Palestinian Territory, the United Arab Emirates and the Canary Islands (Fuerteventura, La Palma).
