= Cosmopterix crassicervicella =

Scientific classification
- Kingdom: Animalia
- Phylum: Arthropoda
- Class: Insecta
- Order: Lepidoptera
- Family: Cosmopterigidae
- Genus: Cosmopterix
- Species: C. crassicervicella

Binomial name
- Cosmopterix crassicervicella Chretien, 1896

Synonyms
- Cosmopteryx crassicervicella Chretien, 1896; Cosmopteryx dalii Agenjo, 1981; Cosmopteryx flavipes Turati, 1930; Cosmopteryx superba Gozmany, 1960

Species of moth

Cosmopterix crassicervicella is a moth of the family Cosmopterigidae. It is found from southern France and the Iberian Peninsula to Greece and Crete. It is also found on the Canary Islands and in the United Arab Emirates.

Adults are on wing from mid-April to mid-June and again from the end of August to the end of October.

The larvae feed on Cyperus species. They mine the leaves of their host plant.
