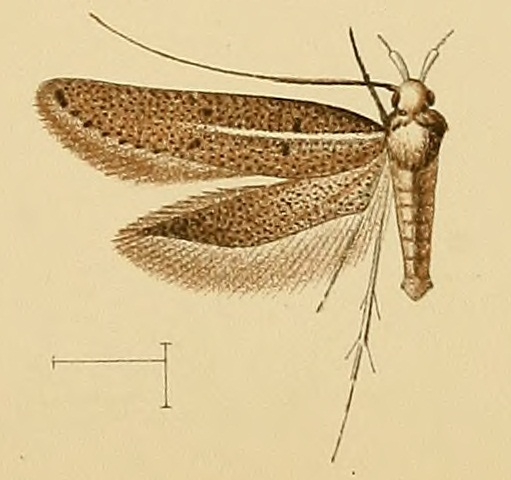

Scientific classification
- Domain: Eukaryota
- Kingdom: Animalia
- Phylum: Arthropoda
- Class: Insecta
- Order: Lepidoptera
- Family: Autostichidae
- Genus: Chersogenes
- Species: C. victimella

Binomial name
- Chersogenes victimella Walsingham, 1908

= Chersogenes victimella =

Species of moth

Chersogenes victimella is a species of moth in the family Autostichidae. It is found on the Canary Islands.

The wingspan is about 12 mm. The forewings are pale cinereous densely sprinkled with fuscous. The hindwings are dark tawny brown.
