= Scythris hierroella =

Scientific classification
- Kingdom: Animalia
- Phylum: Arthropoda
- Clade: Pancrustacea
- Class: Insecta
- Order: Lepidoptera
- Family: Scythrididae
- Genus: Scythris
- Species: S. hierroella

Binomial name
- Scythris hierroella Klimesch, 1986

Species of moth

Scythris hierroella is a moth species of the family Scythrididae. It was described by Klimesch in 1986. It is found on the Canary Islands (El Hierro).
