= Coleophora hystricella =

Scientific classification
- Kingdom: Animalia
- Phylum: Arthropoda
- Class: Insecta
- Order: Lepidoptera
- Family: Coleophoridae
- Genus: Coleophora
- Species: C. hystricella

Binomial name
- Coleophora hystricella Toll, 1957

Species of moth

Coleophora hystricella is a moth of the family Coleophoridae. It is found on the Canary Islands (Fuerteventura) and in Algeria, Tunisia and Turkey.
