= Coleophora sarehma =

Scientific classification
- Kingdom: Animalia
- Phylum: Arthropoda
- Class: Insecta
- Order: Lepidoptera
- Family: Coleophoridae
- Genus: Coleophora
- Species: C. sarehma

Binomial name
- Coleophora sarehma Toll, 1956

Synonyms
- Coleophora exasperatella Toll, 1957

Species of moth

Coleophora sarehma is a moth of the family Coleophoridae. It is found on the Canary Islands and in North Africa.
