= Coleophora teneriffella =

Scientific classification
- Kingdom: Animalia
- Phylum: Arthropoda
- Clade: Pancrustacea
- Class: Insecta
- Order: Lepidoptera
- Family: Coleophoridae
- Genus: Coleophora
- Species: C. teneriffella

Binomial name
- Coleophora teneriffella Baldizzone, 1987

Species of moth

Coleophora teneriffella is a moth of the family Coleophoridae. It is found on the Canary Islands.
