= Coleophora discomaculella =

Scientific classification
- Kingdom: Animalia
- Phylum: Arthropoda
- Class: Insecta
- Order: Lepidoptera
- Family: Coleophoridae
- Genus: Coleophora
- Species: C. discomaculella

Binomial name
- Coleophora discomaculella Toll & Amsel, 1967

Species of moth

Coleophora discomaculella is a moth of the family Coleophoridae. It is found on the Canary Islands (Tenerife, Fuerteventura), Iran, Turkmenistan and Afghanistan.

In Turkmenistan, larvae have been reared from cases on the seeds of Atriplex ornate.
