= Glyphipterix umbilici =

Scientific classification
- Kingdom: Animalia
- Phylum: Arthropoda
- Clade: Pancrustacea
- Class: Insecta
- Order: Lepidoptera
- Family: Glyphipterigidae
- Genus: Glyphipterix
- Species: G. umbilici

Binomial name
- Glyphipterix umbilici M. Hering, 1927

Synonyms
- Glyphipterix talhouki Diakonoff, 1978

Species of moth

Glyphipterix umbilici is a moth of the family Glyphipterigidae. It is found on the Canary Islands and Sardinia and in Portugal and Lebanon.

The larvae feed on Umbilicus rupestris. They mine the leaves of their host plant. The larvae are yellowish white with a brown head. They can be found in February and April.
