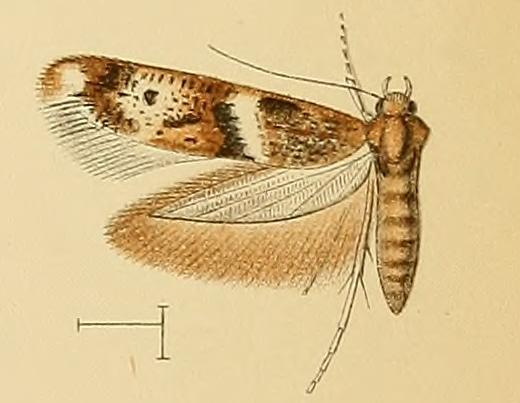

Scientific classification
- Kingdom: Animalia
- Phylum: Arthropoda
- Class: Insecta
- Order: Lepidoptera
- Family: Scythrididae
- Genus: Scythris
- Species: S. fasciatella

Binomial name
- Scythris fasciatella (Ragonot, 1880)

Synonyms
- Butalis fasciatella Ragonot, 1880

= Scythris fasciatella =

Species of moth

Scythris fasciatella is a moth of the family Scythrididae. It is found on the Canary Islands and in Spain.

The wingspan is about 10 mm.
