= Coleophora microalbella =

Scientific classification
- Kingdom: Animalia
- Phylum: Arthropoda
- Class: Insecta
- Order: Lepidoptera
- Family: Coleophoridae
- Genus: Coleophora
- Species: C. microalbella

Binomial name
- Coleophora microalbella Amsel, 1935

Synonyms
- Coleophora sabulella Toll, 1952

Species of moth

Coleophora microalbella is a moth of the family Coleophoridae. It is found on the Canary Islands (Fuerteventura), Spain, Algeria, Tunisia, the Palestinian territories and Oman.

The larva feeds on Salsola species.
