= Coleophora aularia =

Scientific classification
- Kingdom: Animalia
- Phylum: Arthropoda
- Class: Insecta
- Order: Lepidoptera
- Family: Coleophoridae
- Genus: Coleophora
- Species: C. aularia

Binomial name
- Coleophora aularia Meyrick, 1924

Synonyms
- Coleophora haplopennella Toll, 1956

Species of moth

Coleophora aularia is a moth of the family Coleophoridae. It is found in the Canary Islands, Tunisia, Egypt, Sudan, Oman and Saudi Arabia.
