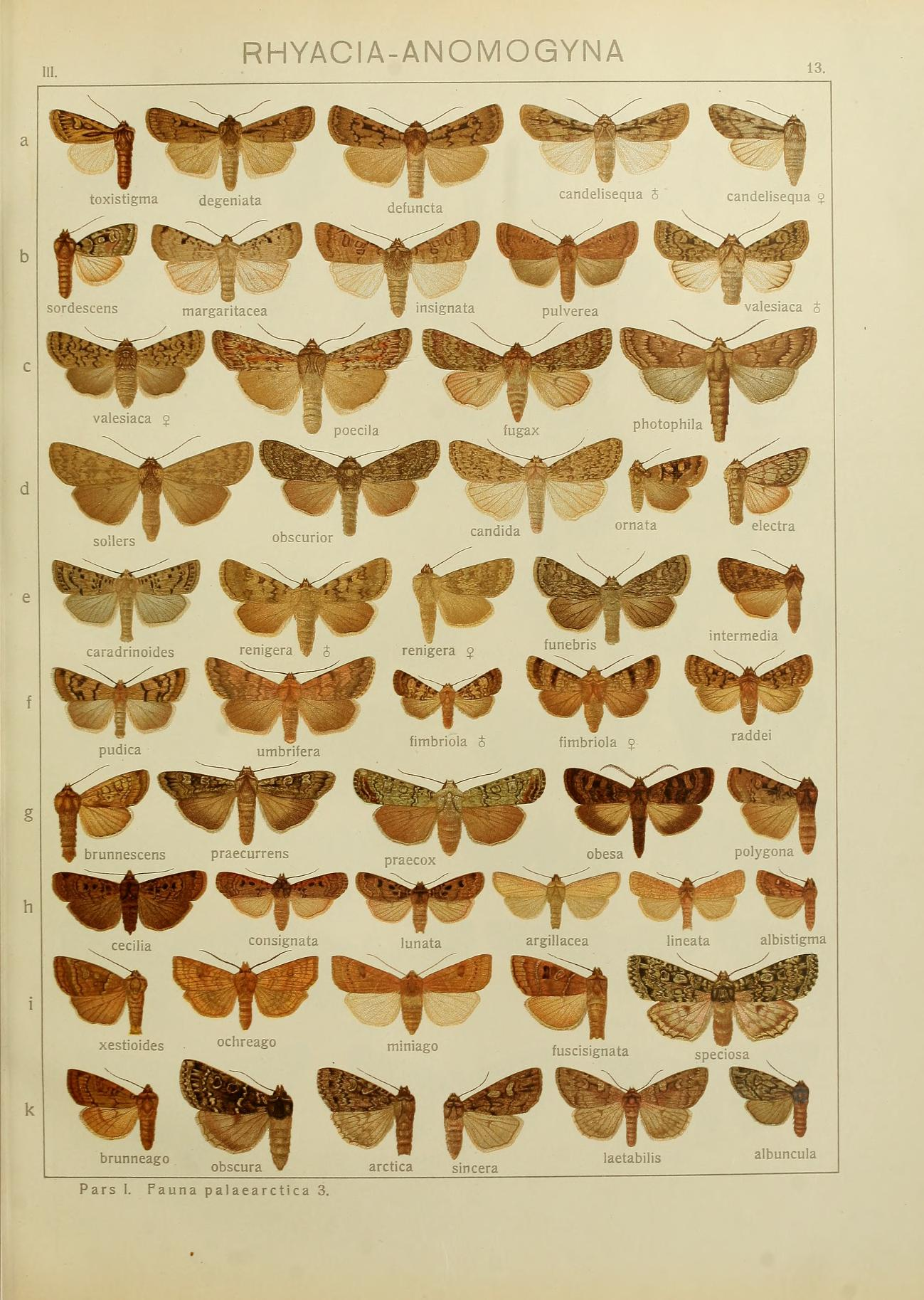
- Parexarnis photophila in Seitz (13c)

Scientific classification
- Kingdom: Animalia
- Phylum: Arthropoda
- Class: Insecta
- Order: Lepidoptera
- Superfamily: Noctuoidea
- Family: Noctuidae
- Genus: Parexarnis
- Species: P. photophila

Binomial name
- Parexarnis photophila (Guenée, 1852)

Synonyms
- Actebia (Parexarnis) photophila (Guenée, 1852); Actebia photophila (Guenée, 1852); Agrotis photophila Guenée, 1852; Agrotis ignipeta Oberthür, 1876

= Parexarnis photophila =

Species of moth

Parexarnis photophila is a moth of the family Noctuidae. It is found on the Canary Islands (La Gomera, Tenerife and Fuerteventura) and in Morocco, Algeria and the southern tip of Spain.

The wingspan is 45–55 mm. Adults are on wing from April to July depending.

== Description from Seitz ==
R. photophila Guen. (=ignipeta Oberth.) (13c). Differs from the W. Asiatic sollers, to which it is otherwise closely allied, by the wholly white and markless underside, and by the paler hindwings. Algeria, C. Bon.
