= Carposina sublucida =

Scientific classification
- Kingdom: Animalia
- Phylum: Arthropoda
- Clade: Pancrustacea
- Class: Insecta
- Order: Lepidoptera
- Family: Carposinidae
- Genus: Carposina
- Species: C. sublucida

Binomial name
- Carposina sublucida Diakonoff, 1989

Species of moth

Carposina sublucida is a moth in the family Carposinidae. It is found on the Canary Islands, specifically on La Gomera.

The wingspan is about 13 mm for males and 14 mm for females. The larvae live on Aeonium
