= Gerarctia =

Scientific classification
- Kingdom: Animalia
- Phylum: Arthropoda
- Class: Insecta
- Order: Lepidoptera
- Superfamily: Noctuoidea
- Family: Noctuidae
- Subfamily: Acontiinae
- Genus: Gerarctia; Hampson, 1905
- Species: G. poliotis

Binomial name
- Gerarctia poliotis Hampson, 1905

Synonyms
- Gerarctia signata Pinker, 1965; Gerarctia teldeensis Pinker, 1965

Genus of moths

Gerarctia is a monotypic moth genus of the family Noctuidae. Its only species, Gerarctia poliotis, is found in the Canary Islands. Both the genus and species were first described by George Hampson in 1905.
