= Coleophora internitens =

Scientific classification
- Kingdom: Animalia
- Phylum: Arthropoda
- Clade: Pancrustacea
- Class: Insecta
- Order: Lepidoptera
- Family: Coleophoridae
- Genus: Coleophora
- Species: C. internitens

Binomial name
- Coleophora internitens Baldizzone & van der Wolf, 1999

Species of moth

Coleophora internitens is a moth of the family Coleophoridae. It is found on the Canary Islands (Fuerteventura), Tunisia and Spain.
