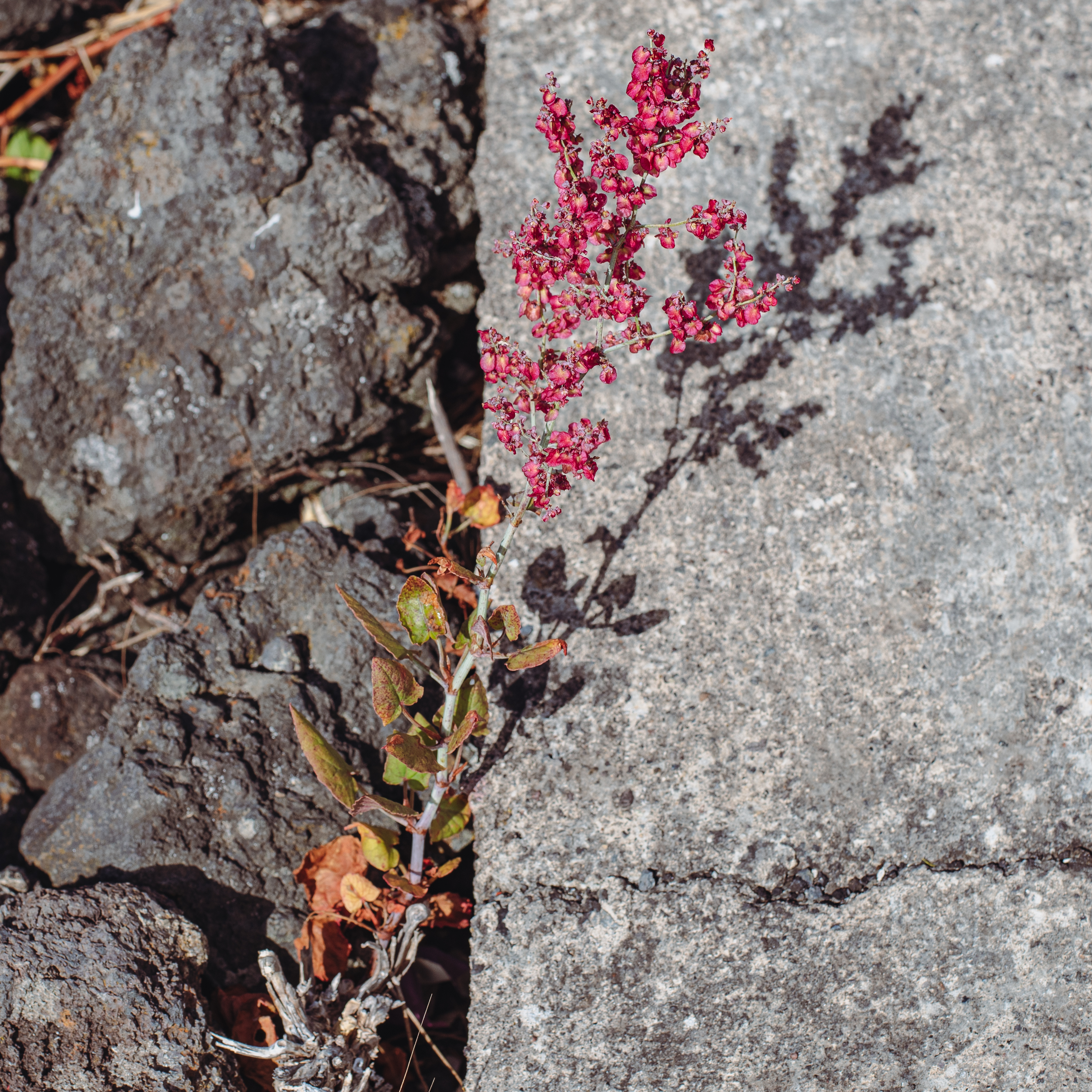

Scientific classification
- Kingdom: Plantae
- Clade: Tracheophytes
- Clade: Angiosperms
- Clade: Eudicots
- Order: Caryophyllales
- Family: Polygonaceae
- Genus: Rumex
- Species: R. maderensis

Binomial name
- Rumex maderensis (Lowe, 1838)

Synonyms
- Acetosa maderensis (Lowe) Á.Löve & B.M.Kapoor (1967); Rumex tingitanus Webb& Bourg. ex Meissn

= Rumex maderensis =

Species of plant

Rumex maderensis, commonly known as Madeira sorrel or Madeira dock, is a species of flowering plant in the buckwheat family Polygonaceae.

== Description ==
Rumex maderensis is a subshrub with ovate-deltoid leaves, that wither at the base. It has simple inflorescences with unisexual flowers, that consist of six perianth segments arranged in two rows. Its fruits are small nuts with membranous, suborbicular valves enclosing it. Both the flowering and fruiting period lasts from sprint to summer with both being wind dispersed. The chromosomal count of the plant is 2n = 40.

== Range ==
The plant grows on Madeira Island and the Western Canary Islands of Tenerife, Gran Canaria, La Palma, La Gomera and El Hierro. In the Teide National Park it grows on the Western slopes of the Montaña de Igueque, in altitudes of about 2100 m.

== Habitat ==
It can mostly be found in the Thermo- and Meso-Mediterranean bioclimatic zones on rocky, humid and shady slopes and ravines, open formation or stony terrain.

== Ecology ==
Rumex maderensis is characteristic of the botanical assemblage known as the Ranunculo cortusifolii-Geranion canariensis alliance.

== Uses ==
In folk medicine R. maderensis is used in poultices for dermatosis and in infusions as a diuretic and blood depurative.

== Biochemistry ==
86 polyphenols and 9 non-phenolic compounds were identied in methanol extracts of leaves, flowers and stems using HPLC–MS, with flowers and leaves having the highest polyphenol content. Vitexin isomers, apigenin-8-C-hexoside-O-rhamnoside and isoorientin were the most common polyphenols in leaves an flowers, with stems having high contents of proanthocyanidins. Even after in vitro digestion extracts showed activity against free radicals with leaf and flower extract exerting the highest activity. The presence of Vitamin C in the plant was confirmed by enzymatic method.
