= Scythris klimeschi =

Scientific classification
- Kingdom: Animalia
- Phylum: Arthropoda
- Class: Insecta
- Order: Lepidoptera
- Family: Scythrididae
- Genus: Scythris
- Species: S. klimeschi

Binomial name
- Scythris klimeschi Passerin d'Entrèves, 1983

Species of moth

Scythris klimeschi is a moth of the family Scythrididae. It was described by Passerin d'Entrèves in 1983. It is found on the Canary Islands.

The wingspan is 9-11.5 mm.

The larvae have been recorded feeding on Salsola oppositifolia, Salsola longifolia and possibly Atriplex parvifolius.
