= Scopula pratana =

Scientific classification
- Domain: Eukaryota
- Kingdom: Animalia
- Phylum: Arthropoda
- Class: Insecta
- Order: Lepidoptera
- Family: Geometridae
- Genus: Scopula
- Species: S. pratana

Binomial name
- Scopula pratana (Fabricius, 1794)

Synonyms
- Phalaena pratana Fabricius, 1794; Oar pratana; Cidaria ectypata Mabille, 1888; Fidonia megearia Oberthur, 1881; Phalaena pratanaria Turton, 1802; Coremia oppressa Walker, 1870; Fidonia megiaria obscuraria Bethune-Baker, 1894; Emmiltis nigrescens Hampson, 1896; Oar occidens Prout, 1935; Fidonia mortuaria Staudinger, 1898

Species of geometer moth in subfamily Sterrhinae

Scopula pratana is a moth of the family Geometridae. It is found in North Africa, the Canary Islands, the Near East and Yemen.

== Subspecies ==
- Scopula pratana pratana (North Africa)
- Scopula pratana baezi Hausmann, 2004 (Canary Islands)
- Scopula pratana mortuaria (Staudinger, 1898) (Palestine)
- Scopula pratana occidens (Prout, 1935)
- Scopula pratana oppressa (Walker, 1870) (Yemen)
