= Coleophora pseudopoecilella =

Scientific classification
- Kingdom: Animalia
- Phylum: Arthropoda
- Clade: Pancrustacea
- Class: Insecta
- Order: Lepidoptera
- Family: Coleophoridae
- Genus: Coleophora
- Species: C. pseudopoecilella

Binomial name
- Coleophora pseudopoecilella Klimesch, 1982

Species of moth

Coleophora pseudopoecilella is a moth of the family Coleophoridae. It is found on the Canary Islands (Tenerife, Fuerteventura).

The larvae feed on Patellifolia procumbens and Salsola oppositifolia.
