= Eupithecia schuetzeata =

Scientific classification
- Domain: Eukaryota
- Kingdom: Animalia
- Phylum: Arthropoda
- Class: Insecta
- Order: Lepidoptera
- Family: Geometridae
- Genus: Eupithecia
- Species: E. schuetzeata

Binomial name
- Eupithecia schuetzeata Pinker, 1961

Species of moth

Eupithecia schuetzeata is a moth in the family Geometridae. It is found on the Canary Islands.

The wingspan is 15–19 mm. Adults are on wing in winter, including December.

The larvae feed on Sonchus species.
