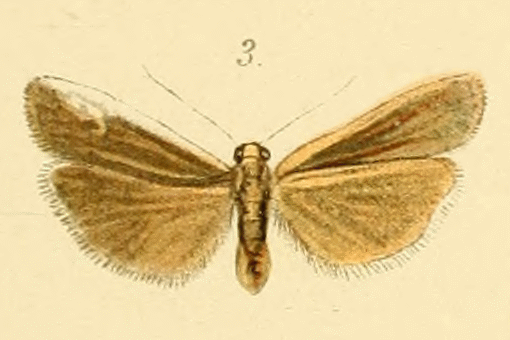

Scientific classification
- Domain: Eukaryota
- Kingdom: Animalia
- Phylum: Arthropoda
- Class: Insecta
- Order: Lepidoptera
- Superfamily: Noctuoidea
- Family: Erebidae
- Subfamily: Arctiinae
- Genus: Eilema
- Species: E. albicosta

Binomial name
- Eilema albicosta (Rogenhofer, 1894)

Synonyms
- Lithosia albicosta Rogenhofer, 1894

= Eilema albicosta =

Species of moth

Eilema albicosta is a moth of the subfamily Arctiinae first described by Alois Friedrich Rogenhofer in 1894. It is found in Spain and on the Canary Islands.

Adults are on wing year round.

The larvae feed on algae, mosses, lichen and detritus.
