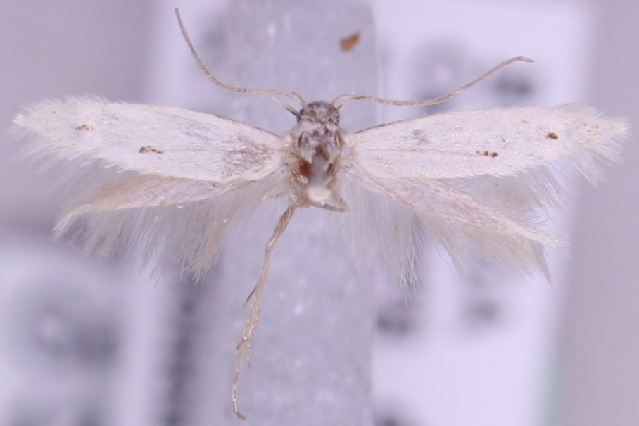

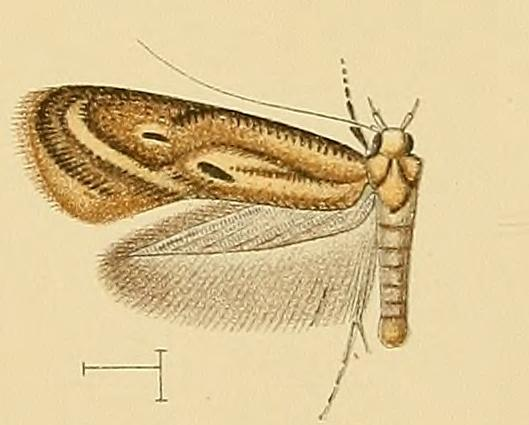

Scientific classification
- Kingdom: Animalia
- Phylum: Arthropoda
- Clade: Pancrustacea
- Class: Insecta
- Order: Lepidoptera
- Family: Elachistidae
- Genus: Elachista
- Species: E. contaminatella

Binomial name
- Elachista contaminatella Zeller, 1847

= Elachista contaminatella =

Species of moth

Elachista contaminatella is a moth of the family Elachistidae that is found from France, Austria and Slovakia to the Iberian Peninsula, Sardinia and Sicily. It is also found in Bulgaria and Russia.

The wingspan is about 8 millimetres (0.31 in).

The larvae feed on Carex distans. They mine the leaves of their host plant.
