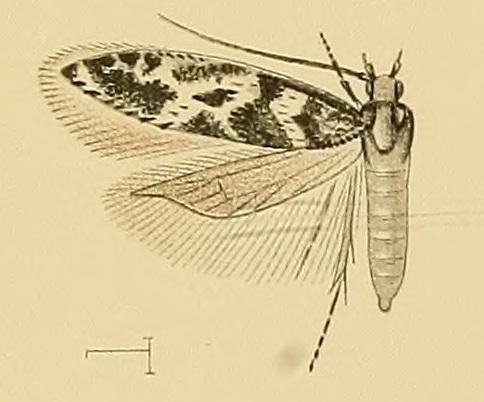

Scientific classification
- Domain: Eukaryota
- Kingdom: Animalia
- Phylum: Arthropoda
- Class: Insecta
- Order: Lepidoptera
- Family: Gelechiidae
- Genus: Pragmatodes
- Species: P. fruticosella

Binomial name
- Pragmatodes fruticosella Walsingham, 1908

Synonyms
- Phragmatodes fruticosella

= Pragmatodes fruticosella =

Species of moth

Pragmatodes fruticosella is a moth of the family Gelechiidae. It is found on the Canary Islands.

The wingspan is 6.5–7.5 mm. The forewings are dirty stone-whitish, dusted with fuscous. The hindwings are grey. Adults have been recorded on wing from January to March and in May.

The larvae feed on Rubia fruticosa and Plocama pendula. They mine the leaves of their host plant.
