= Cherchera =

Scientific classification
- Domain: Eukaryota
- Kingdom: Animalia
- Phylum: Arthropoda
- Class: Insecta
- Order: Lepidoptera
- Family: Pyralidae
- Subfamily: Phycitinae
- Genus: Cherchera; Dumont, 1932
- Species: C. abatesella

Binomial name
- Cherchera abatesella Dumont, 1932

Genus of moths

Cherchera is a genus of snout moths. It was described by Constantin Dumont in 1932 and contains the species Cherchera abatesella. It is found in the Canary Islands, Tunisia, Malta and the United Arab Emirates.

The larvae feed on Acacia tortilis. They reach a length of 20–25 mm.
