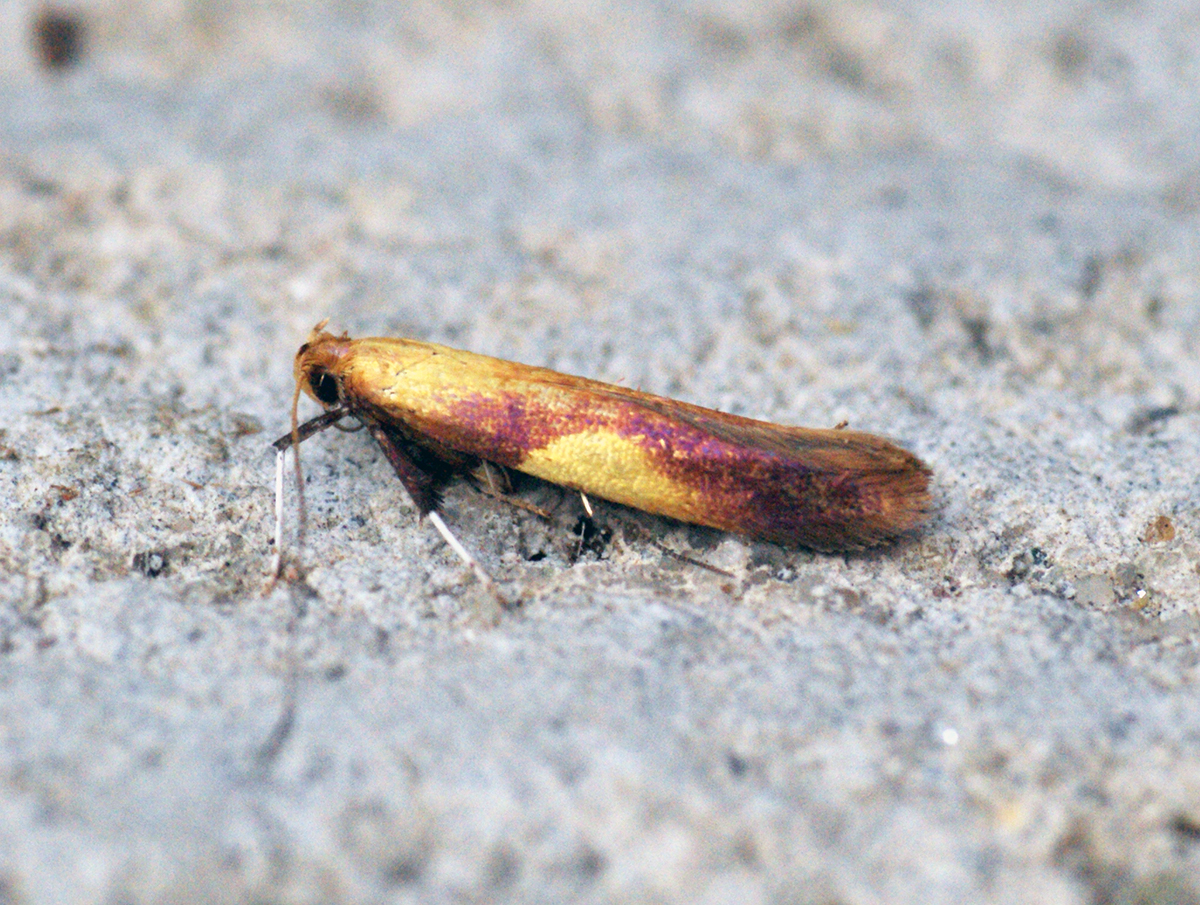

Scientific classification
- Domain: Eukaryota
- Kingdom: Animalia
- Phylum: Arthropoda
- Class: Insecta
- Order: Lepidoptera
- Family: Gracillariidae
- Genus: Caloptilia
- Species: C. robustella

Binomial name
- Caloptilia robustella Jäckh, 1972

= Caloptilia robustella =

New oak slender

Species of moth

Caloptilia robustella (commonly known as new oak slender) is a moth of the family Gracillariidae. It is known from all of Europe, except the Balkan Peninsula.

The wingspan is 10–13 millimetres (0.39–0.51 in). To differentiate this species from Caloptilia alchimiella requires microscopic examination of the genitalia.

There are multiple generations per year, with adults on wing between April and November.

The larvae feed on Fagus sylvatica and Quercus robur. They mine the leaves of their host plant.
