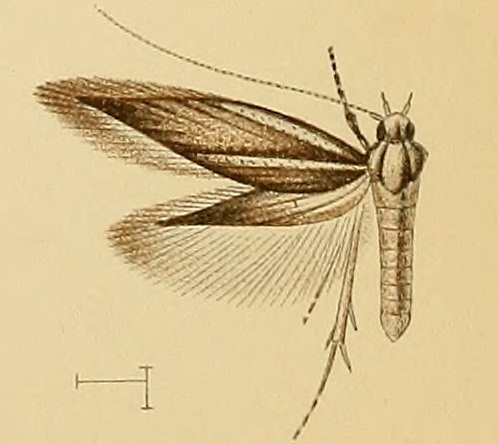

Scientific classification
- Kingdom: Animalia
- Phylum: Arthropoda
- Class: Insecta
- Order: Lepidoptera
- Family: Autostichidae
- Genus: Chersogenes
- Species: C. brachyptera

Binomial name
- Chersogenes brachyptera (Walsingham, 1908)

Synonyms
- Ambloma brachyptera Walsingham, 1908

= Chersogenes brachyptera =

Species of moth

Chersogenes brachyptera is a species of moth in the family Symmocidae. It is found on the Canary Islands.

== Description ==
The wingspan is about 9 mm. The forewings are hoary white, sprinkled with dark stony-grey scales. The hindwings are whitish grey.

Larvae have been found under the leaves of Lotus sessilifolius.
