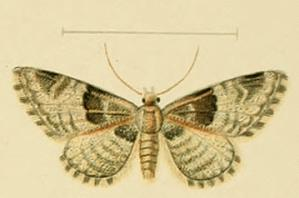

Scientific classification
- Domain: Eukaryota
- Kingdom: Animalia
- Phylum: Arthropoda
- Class: Insecta
- Order: Lepidoptera
- Family: Geometridae
- Genus: Eupithecia
- Species: E. stertzi

Binomial name
- Eupithecia stertzi (Rebel, 1911)

Synonyms
- Tephroclystia stertzi Rebel, 1911

= Eupithecia stertzi =

Species of moth

Eupithecia stertzi is a moth in the family Geometridae. It is found on the Canary Islands.

The wingspan is about 18–19 mm.
