= Coleophora areniphila =

Scientific classification
- Kingdom: Animalia
- Phylum: Arthropoda
- Class: Insecta
- Order: Lepidoptera
- Family: Coleophoridae
- Genus: Coleophora
- Species: C. areniphila

Binomial name
- Coleophora areniphila Toll, 1957

Species of moth

Coleophora areniphila is a moth of the family Coleophoridae that can be found on the Canary Islands (Fuerteventura), Tunisia and Algeria.
