= Caina (moth) =

Scientific classification
- Domain: Eukaryota
- Kingdom: Animalia
- Phylum: Arthropoda
- Class: Insecta
- Order: Lepidoptera
- Family: Pyralidae
- Subfamily: Phycitinae
- Genus: Caina; Ragonot, 1893

Genus of moths

Caina is a genus of snout moths. It was described by Émile Louis Ragonot in 1893.

== Species ==
- Caina deletella Ragonot, 1893
- Caina micrella Ragonot, 1893
