= Caina deletella =

Scientific classification
- Domain: Eukaryota
- Kingdom: Animalia
- Phylum: Arthropoda
- Class: Insecta
- Order: Lepidoptera
- Family: Pyralidae
- Genus: Caina
- Species: C. deletella

Binomial name
- Caina deletella Ragonot, 1893

Species of moth

Caina deletella is a species of snout moth. It was described by Émile Louis Ragonot in 1893. It is found in southern Iraq in the Persian Gulf region, Pune in India, Malta as well as the Canary Islands.
