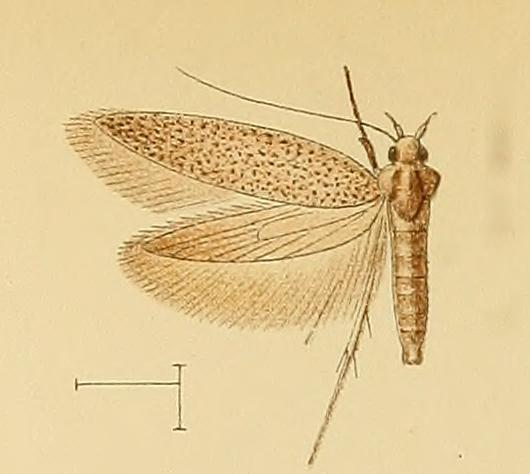

Scientific classification
- Kingdom: Animalia
- Phylum: Arthropoda
- Class: Insecta
- Order: Lepidoptera
- Family: Autostichidae
- Genus: Chersogenes
- Species: C. sophroniellus

Binomial name
- Chersogenes sophroniellus (Rebel, 1895)

Synonyms
- Holcopogon sophroniellus Rebel, 1895; Epanastasis sophroniella (Rebel, 1894); Epanastasis sophroniellus (Rebel, 1894); Symmoca aegrella Walsingham, 1908

= Chersogenes sophroniellus =

Species of moth

Chersogenes sophroniellus is a species of moth in the family Autostichidae. It is found on the Canary Islands.

The wingspan is about 12 mm. The ground colour of the forewings is yellowish brown. The hindwings are dark grey.
