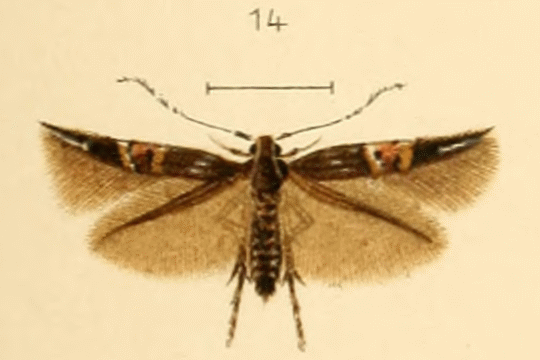

Scientific classification
- Kingdom: Animalia
- Phylum: Arthropoda
- Class: Insecta
- Order: Lepidoptera
- Family: Cosmopterigidae
- Genus: Cosmopterix
- Species: C. turbidella

Binomial name
- Cosmopterix turbidella (Rebel, 1896)

Synonyms
- Cosmopteryx turbidella Rebel, 1896

= Cosmopterix turbidella =

Species of moth

Cosmopterix turbidella is a moth of the family Cosmopterigidae. It is known from the Canary Islands.

The wingspan is 7–8 mm.

The larvae feed on Forsskalea angustifolia, Gesnouinia arborea, Parietaria debilis and Parietaria officinalis. They mine the leaves of their host plant.
