= Chersogenes eupracta =

Scientific classification
- Kingdom: Animalia
- Phylum: Arthropoda
- Clade: Pancrustacea
- Class: Insecta
- Order: Lepidoptera
- Family: Autostichidae
- Genus: Chersogenes
- Species: C. eupracta

Binomial name
- Chersogenes eupracta (Gozmány, 1988)

Synonyms
- Epanastasis eupracta Gozmány, 1988

Species of moth

Chersogenes eupracta is a species of moth in the family Autostichidae. It is found on the Canary Islands.
