= Chersogenes klimeschi =

Scientific classification
- Kingdom: Animalia
- Phylum: Arthropoda
- Clade: Pancrustacea
- Class: Insecta
- Order: Lepidoptera
- Family: Autostichidae
- Genus: Chersogenes
- Species: C. klimeschi

Binomial name
- Chersogenes klimeschi (Gozmány, 1975)

Synonyms
- Ambloma klimeschi Gozmány, 1975; Chersogenes excellens (Gozmány, 1977); Epanastasis excellens (Gozmány, 1977)

Species of moth

Chersogenes klimeschi is a species of moth in the family Symmocidae. It is endemic to the Canary Islands and is known from Gran Canaria, La Gomera, El Hierro, and Tenerife.

The wingspan is 8–12 mm (0.31–0.47 in).
