= Coleophora confluella =

Scientific classification
- Kingdom: Animalia
- Phylum: Arthropoda
- Class: Insecta
- Order: Lepidoptera
- Family: Coleophoridae
- Genus: Coleophora
- Species: C. confluella

Binomial name
- Coleophora confluella Rebel, 1892

Species of moth

Coleophora confluella is a moth of the family Coleophoridae. It is found in on the Canary Islands.

The larvae feed on Cistus monspeliensis, Cistus vaginatus, Helianthemum guttatum and Tuberaria species. Larvae can be found from March to April.
