= Coleophora loti =

Scientific classification
- Kingdom: Animalia
- Phylum: Arthropoda
- Class: Insecta
- Order: Lepidoptera
- Family: Coleophoridae
- Genus: Coleophora
- Species: C. loti

Binomial name
- Coleophora loti Falkovitsh, 1978

Species of moth

Coleophora loti is a moth of the family Coleophoridae. It is found in the Canary Islands.

The larvae feed on Lotus sessilifolius. Larvae can be found from February to April.
