= Carposina cinderella =

Scientific classification
- Kingdom: Animalia
- Phylum: Arthropoda
- Clade: Pancrustacea
- Class: Insecta
- Order: Lepidoptera
- Family: Carposinidae
- Genus: Carposina
- Species: C. cinderella

Binomial name
- Carposina cinderella Diakonoff, 1989

Species of moth

Carposina cinderella is a moth in the family Carposinidae. It is found on the Canary Islands with the type locality Guimar, Tenerife.

The wingspan is 16.5 mm in the male holotype.
