= Eupithecia gomerensis =

Scientific classification
- Domain: Eukaryota
- Kingdom: Animalia
- Phylum: Arthropoda
- Class: Insecta
- Order: Lepidoptera
- Family: Geometridae
- Genus: Eupithecia
- Species: E. gomerensis

Binomial name
- Eupithecia gomerensis (Rebel, 1917)

Synonyms
- Tephroclystia gomerensis Rebel, 1917

Species of moth

Eupithecia gomerensis is a moth in the family Geometridae. It is found on the Canary Islands.

The wingspan is 17–19 mm.

== Subspecies ==
- Eupithecia gomerensis gomerensis
- Eupithecia gomerensis leucophaeata Pinker, 1969
