= Eupithecia pantellata =

Scientific classification
- Kingdom: Animalia
- Phylum: Arthropoda
- Clade: Pancrustacea
- Class: Insecta
- Order: Lepidoptera
- Family: Geometridae
- Genus: Eupithecia
- Species: E. pantellata

Binomial name
- Eupithecia pantellata Milliere, 1875

Synonyms
- Eupithecia deverrata Chretien, 1910 (preocc. Dietze, 1910); Eupithecia illuminata de Joannis, 1891; Eupithecia luteostrigata Staudinger, 1876; Eupithecia tedaldiata Fuchs, 1901; Eupithecia canariensis Pinker, 1962

Species of moth

Eupithecia pantellata is a moth in the family Geometridae. It is found in Spain, Portugal, Sicily and North Africa and the Canary Islands.

The wingspan is 14–16 mm.

== Subspecies ==
- Eupithecia pantellata pantellata
- Eupithecia pantellata andalusica Wehrli, 1926
- Eupithecia pantellata canariata Pinker, 1965
