= Coleophora polycarpaeae =

Scientific classification
- Kingdom: Animalia
- Phylum: Arthropoda
- Class: Insecta
- Order: Lepidoptera
- Family: Coleophoridae
- Genus: Coleophora
- Species: C. polycarpaeae

Binomial name
- Coleophora polycarpaeae Hering, 1927

Species of moth

Coleophora polycarpaeae is a moth of the family Coleophoridae. It is found on the Canary Islands.
