= Archigalleria =

Scientific classification
- Domain: Eukaryota
- Kingdom: Animalia
- Phylum: Arthropoda
- Class: Insecta
- Order: Lepidoptera
- Family: Pyralidae
- Subfamily: Phycitinae
- Genus: Archigalleria; Rebel, 1901
- Species: A. proavitella

Binomial name
- Archigalleria proavitella (Rebel, 1892)

Synonyms
- Aphomia proavitella Rebel, 1892; Dioryctria teneriffella Caradja, 1916

Genus of moths

Archigalleria is a genus of snout moths. It was described by Rebel, in 1901, and contains the species A. proavitella. It is found on the Canary Islands.

The wingspan is about 36 mm.
