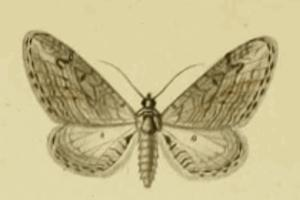

Scientific classification
- Domain: Eukaryota
- Kingdom: Animalia
- Phylum: Arthropoda
- Class: Insecta
- Order: Lepidoptera
- Family: Geometridae
- Genus: Eupithecia
- Species: E. unedonata

Binomial name
- Eupithecia unedonata Mabille, 1868

= Eupithecia unedonata =

Species of moth

Eupithecia unedonata is a moth in the family Geometridae. It is found in Spain, France, Italy, Corsica, Sardinia, Sicily, Malta, Greece, Crete, Rhodes, North Africa (Morocco, Algeria, Tunisia, Libya, Egypt), Israel, Lebanon, Turkey and Transcaucasia.

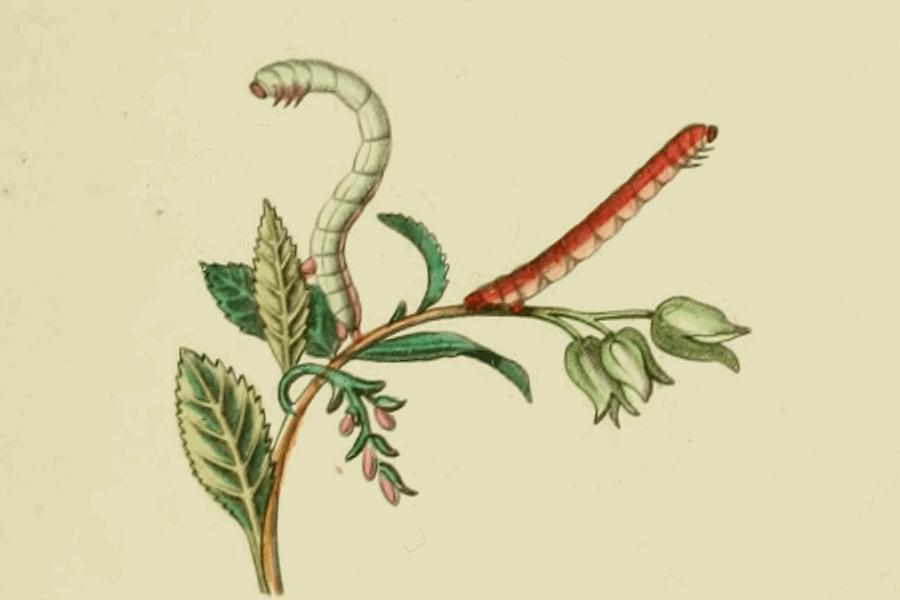
Larvae

The wingspan is 18–21 mm. There are two generations per year

The larvae feed on Arbutus unedo, Thymelaea hirsuta and Rhus tripartita.
