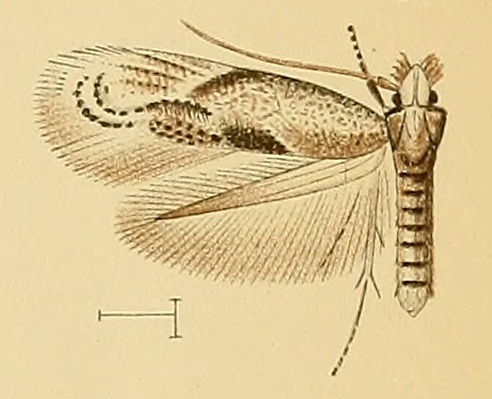

Scientific classification
- Kingdom: Animalia
- Phylum: Arthropoda
- Clade: Pancrustacea
- Class: Insecta
- Order: Lepidoptera
- Family: Bucculatricidae
- Genus: Bucculatrix
- Species: B. phagnalella

Binomial name
- Bucculatrix phagnalella Walsingham, 1908

= Bucculatrix phagnalella =

Species of moth

Bucculatrix phagnalella is a moth of the family Bucculatricidae. It is found in mainland Spain and on Mallorca, Rhodes and the Canary Islands. It was described in 1908 by Thomas de Grey, 6th Baron Walsingham.

The wingspan is 7–8 mm. The forewings are whitish, thickly sprinkled with fuscous and fawn-brown scaling. The hindwings are shining pale grey.

The larvae feed on Phagnalon saxatile. They mine the leaves of their host plant. The larvae can be found from November to December.
