= Ambluncus =

Scientific classification
- Kingdom: Animalia
- Phylum: Arthropoda
- Class: Insecta
- Order: Lepidoptera
- Family: Pyralidae
- Genus: Ambluncus; Amsel, 1954
- Species: A. nervosellus

Binomial name
- Ambluncus nervosellus Meyrick, 1934

Genus of moths

Ambluncus is a monotypic snout moth genus described by Hans Georg Amsel in 1954. It contains the species Ambluncus nervosellus, described by Edward Meyrick in 1934. It has been recorded from the Canary Islands and the United Arab Emirates, and probably the rest of North Africa.
