= Coleophora aegyptiacae =

Scientific classification
- Kingdom: Animalia
- Phylum: Arthropoda
- Class: Insecta
- Order: Lepidoptera
- Family: Coleophoridae
- Genus: Coleophora
- Species: C. aegyptiacae

Binomial name
- Coleophora aegyptiacae Walsingham, 1907

Species of moth

Coleophora aegyptiacae is a moth of the family Coleophoridae. It is found on the Canary Islands (Tenerife, Fuerteventura) and in Morocco, Algeria, Tunisia, Libya, Saudi Arabia, Israel, the Palestinian Territories and Iran, Oman and Yemen.

The larvae feed on the leaves Salvia aegyptiaca. They live in a case.
