= Elachista canariella =

Scientific classification
- Kingdom: Animalia
- Phylum: Arthropoda
- Class: Insecta
- Order: Lepidoptera
- Family: Elachistidae
- Genus: Elachista
- Species: E. canariella

Binomial name
- Elachista canariella Nielsen & Traugott-Olsen, 1987

Species of moth

Elachista canariella is a moth of the family Elachistidae. It is found on the Canary Islands.
