= Coleophora pinkeri =

Scientific classification
- Kingdom: Animalia
- Phylum: Arthropoda
- Clade: Pancrustacea
- Class: Insecta
- Order: Lepidoptera
- Family: Coleophoridae
- Genus: Coleophora
- Species: C. pinkeri

Binomial name
- Coleophora pinkeri Baldizzone, 1982

Species of moth

Coleophora pinkeri is a moth of the family Coleophoridae. It is found on the Canary Islands.
