= Eupithecia boryata =

Scientific classification
- Kingdom: Animalia
- Phylum: Arthropoda
- Clade: Pancrustacea
- Class: Insecta
- Order: Lepidoptera
- Family: Geometridae
- Genus: Eupithecia
- Species: E. boryata

Binomial name
- Eupithecia boryata (Rebel, 1906)

Synonyms
- Tephroclystia boryata Rebel, 1906

Species of moth

Eupithecia boryata is a moth in the family Geometridae. The moth is found on the Canary Islands.

The wingspan is about 14–15 mm.

The larvae probably feed on Quercus species.
