= Coleophora gibberosa =

Scientific classification
- Kingdom: Animalia
- Phylum: Arthropoda
- Clade: Pancrustacea
- Class: Insecta
- Order: Lepidoptera
- Family: Coleophoridae
- Genus: Coleophora
- Species: C. gibberosa

Binomial name
- Coleophora gibberosa Baldizzone, 2003

Species of moth

Coleophora gibberosa is a moth of the family Coleophoridae. It is found on the Canary Islands (Fuerteventura) and in Algeria.
