= Ischnophanes canariella =

Scientific classification
- Kingdom: Animalia
- Phylum: Arthropoda
- Clade: Pancrustacea
- Class: Insecta
- Order: Lepidoptera
- Family: Coleophoridae
- Genus: Ischnophanes
- Species: I. canariella

Binomial name
- Ischnophanes canariella Baldizzone, 1984

Species of moth

Ischnophanes canariella is a moth of the family Coleophoridae. It is found on the Canary Islands (Tenerife).
