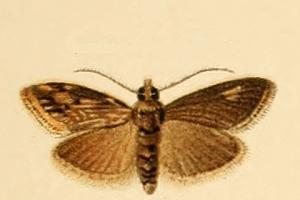

Scientific classification
- Domain: Eukaryota
- Kingdom: Animalia
- Phylum: Arthropoda
- Class: Insecta
- Order: Lepidoptera
- Family: Crambidae
- Genus: Dentifovea
- Species: D. praecultalis

Binomial name
- Dentifovea praecultalis (Rebel, 1896)

Synonyms
- Cybolomia praecultalis Rebel, 1896

= Dentifovea praecultalis =

Species of moth

Dentifovea praecultalis is a species of moth in the family Crambidae. It is found on the Canary Islands.

The wingspan is about 16 mm.
