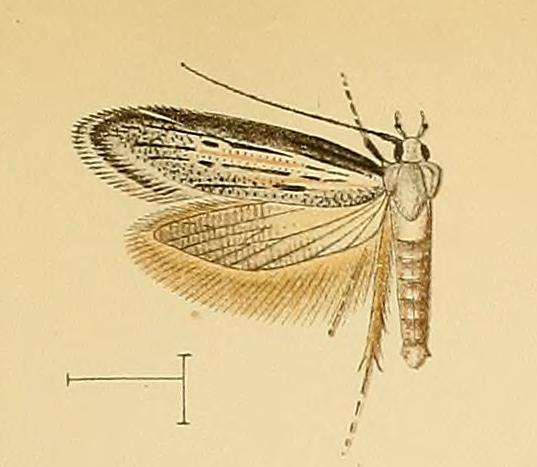

Scientific classification
- Kingdom: Animalia
- Phylum: Arthropoda
- Clade: Pancrustacea
- Class: Insecta
- Order: Lepidoptera
- Family: Autostichidae
- Genus: Chersogenes
- Species: C. canariensis

Binomial name
- Chersogenes canariensis (Rebel, 1906)

Synonyms
- Symmoca canariensis Rebel, 1906; Epanastasis canariensis (Rebel, 1906); Epanastasis extricata Gozmány, 1964

= Chersogenes canariensis =

Species of moth

Chersogenes canariensis is a species of moth in the family Autostichidae. It is found on the Canary Islands.

The wingspan is about 14 mm. The ground colour of the forewings is white with grey suffusion. The hindwings are brownish-grey.
