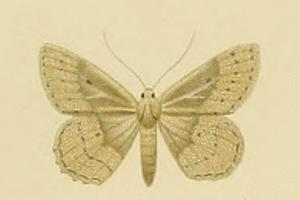

Scientific classification
- Domain: Eukaryota
- Kingdom: Animalia
- Phylum: Arthropoda
- Class: Insecta
- Order: Lepidoptera
- Family: Geometridae
- Genus: Scopula
- Species: S. guancharia

Binomial name
- Scopula guancharia (Alphéraky, 1889)

Synonyms
- Acidalia guancharia Alphéraky, 1889

= Scopula guancharia =

Species of geometer moth in subfamily Sterrhinae

Scopula guancharia is a moth of the family Geometridae. It is found on the Canary Islands.

The wingspan is 23–24 mm. Adults are on wing nearly year round.

The larvae feed on various herbaceous plants, including Calendula species.

== Subspecies ==
- Scopula guancharia guancharia
- Scopula guancharia illustris Pinker, 1968
- Scopula guancharia mus Pinker, 1968
- Scopula guancharia uniformis Pinker, 1968
