= Phyllonorycter klimeschiella =

Scientific classification
- Kingdom: Animalia
- Phylum: Arthropoda
- Class: Insecta
- Order: Lepidoptera
- Family: Gracillariidae
- Genus: Phyllonorycter
- Species: P. klimeschiella

Binomial name
- Phyllonorycter klimeschiella (Deschka, 1970)

Synonyms
- Lithocolletis klimeschiella Deschka, 1970

Species of moth

Phyllonorycter klimeschiella is a moth of the family Gracillariidae. It is known from the Canary Islands.

The larvae feed on Arbutus canariensis. They mine the leaves of their host plant.
