= Coleophora orotavensis =

Scientific classification
- Kingdom: Animalia
- Phylum: Arthropoda
- Class: Insecta
- Order: Lepidoptera
- Family: Coleophoridae
- Genus: Coleophora
- Species: C. orotavensis

Binomial name
- Coleophora orotavensis Rebel, 1896

Species of moth

Coleophora orotavensis is a moth of the family Coleophoridae. It is found on the Canary Islands (La Gomera, Tenerife, Gran Canaria, La Palma and Fuerteventura).

The larvae feed in larval cases on Chenopodium hybridum.
