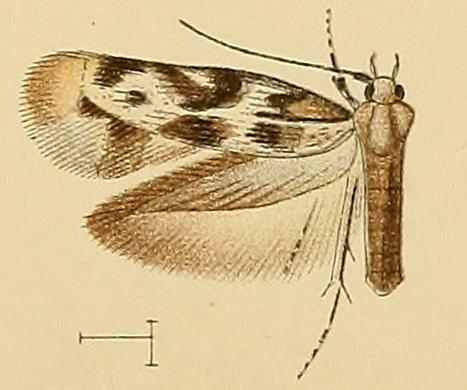

Scientific classification
- Kingdom: Animalia
- Phylum: Arthropoda
- Clade: Pancrustacea
- Class: Insecta
- Order: Lepidoptera
- Family: Scythrididae
- Genus: Scythris
- Species: S. petrella

Binomial name
- Scythris petrella Walsingham, 1908

= Scythris petrella =

Species of moth

Scythris petrella is a moth of the family Scythrididae. It is found on the Canary Islands.

The wingspan is 8–9 mm. The forewings are greyish fuscous, mottled with ashy white. The base is sprinkled with ashy white scales. The hindwings are grey.

The larvae feed on Rocelia fusiformis.
