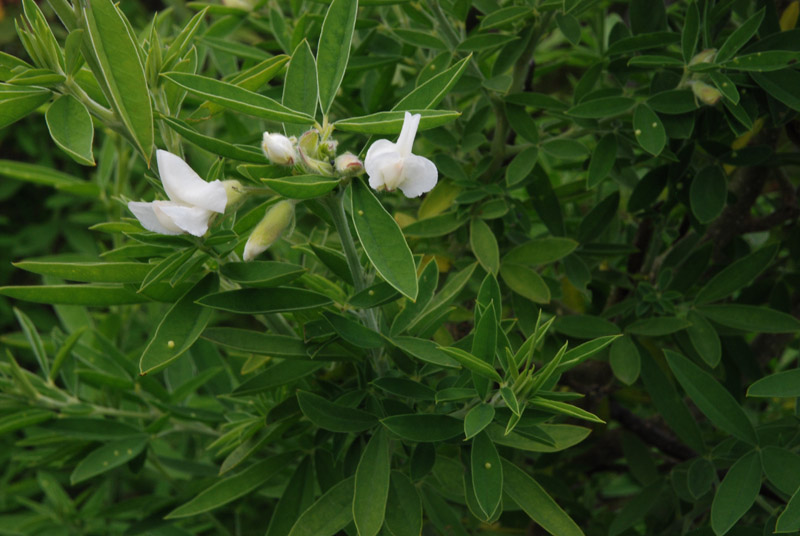

Conservation status
- Least Concern (IUCN 3.1)

Scientific classification
- Kingdom: Plantae
- Clade: Tracheophytes
- Clade: Angiosperms
- Clade: Eudicots
- Clade: Rosids
- Order: Fabales
- Family: Fabaceae
- Subfamily: Faboideae
- Genus: Chamaecytisus
- Species: C. proliferus

Binomial name
- Chamaecytisus proliferus (L. f.) Link

Synonyms
- Cytisus proliferus L.f.; Diaxulon proliferus (L.f.) Raf.

= Chamaecytisus proliferus =

Species of legume

Chamaecytisus proliferus, synonym Cytisus proliferus, is a small spreading evergreen shrub or tree in the pea family Fabaceae endemic to the Canary Islands. One of its subspecies, Chamaecytisus proliferus subsp. palmensis, synonyms including Chamaecytisus palmensis and Cytisus palmensis, known as tagasaste or tree lucerne, is a well known tropical forage crop. It is native to the dry volcanic slopes of the Canary Islands, but it is now grown in Australia, New Zealand and many other parts of the world.

== Description ==
Tagasaste is an evergreen shrub that has rough yellow-grey bark and velvety hairy young growth. Its leaves are composed of three greyish-green equal-sized leaflets, which are slightly paler on the underside. Its scented, creamy-white flowers form in small clusters in the leaf axils. Its flat pea-like pods are green, ripening to black. The seeds are tiny (45,000/kg), shiny and black. Tagasaste is considered to be a promiscuous legume, compatible with cowpea and Tagasaste 1502 Rhizobium. It will nodulate with a wide range of rhizobia.

Tagasaste is suited to sandy, well-drained soils of pH range 4–7. On deep, freely drained soils its roots can extend down to at least 10 metres. Any physical or chemical barrier in the soil that restricts root growth will reduce the productivity and survival of tagasaste. Cultivars from arid sandy areas are very susceptible to root rot fungus on poorly drained soils, specifically Fusarium, Pythium and Rhizoctonia. It will tolerate winter temperatures as low as −9 °C, but cultivars exist that can handle winter temperatures down to minus 15 °C as in Orange, Eastern Australia. Tagasaste leaves will be burnt by frost and seedlings can be killed at temperatures below 0 °C. Growth of mature trees will slow at winter temperatures below 20 °C. Tagasaste can tolerate temperatures up to 50 °C, but above 36 °C leaves close up from stress. Tagasaste flowers during the early rainy season, typically June to October in Australia, New Zealand and East Africa.

Tagasaste has two types of roots. There are a few large 'sinker' roots that can extend down to at least 10 metres. These are used to extract moisture from that depth during the long dry summers. There are also many 'feeder' roots that are mostly confined to the top 1 1/2 metres. These can extend out at least 15 metres from the trunk. They extract mineral nutrients from the soil, and also water in winter. In summer the soil water can be taken up at depth by the sinker roots, drawn into the shallow feed roots and then pumped into the soil. This 'hydraulic lift' allows the tagasaste to keep extracting nutrients from the shallow soil which would otherwise be too dry. This hydraulic lift is also seen in the native banksia shrubs that grow naturally on these soils and have a similar root design.

When tagasaste is planted in rows that run north–south, it has been found that both the shoots and the roots grow twice as fast on the west side of the plant as on the east side.

== Taxonomy ==
Chamaecytisus proliferus was first described by Carl Linnaeus the Younger in 1782 as Cytisus proliferus. It was transferred to the genus Chamaecytisus in 1831.

=== Subspecies ===
As of August 2025, Plants of the World Online accepted four subspecies:

- Chamaecytisus proliferus subsp. angustifolius (Kuntze) G.Kunkel
- Chamaecytisus proliferus subsp. meridionalis Acebes
- Chamaecytisus proliferus subsp. palmensis (Christ) G.Kunkel
- Chamaecytisus proliferus subsp. proliferus

== Fodder crop ==
Tagasaste is a valued forage for ruminants because of its good palatability and high protein content. It can be grazed directly, or cut and fed fresh or dried.

As a fodder crop tagasaste delivers between 23 and 27% crude protein (14–30% in Western Australia) and 18–24% crude indigestible fibre. With proper application of fertiliser it can maintain these levels even when grown on poor soils.

Phosphorus is particularly important both for the growth of tagasaste and for the growth of the animals grazing on it. Higher levels of phosphorus are required for the maximum growth of the animals than for maximum plant growth. Fertiliser will also reduce the level of phenolic compounds (similar to tannins) that increase when the plants are moisture stressed. These phenolic compounds make the tagasaste less palatable and reduce the animals' feed intake. The phenolics suppress the utilisation of protein in the rumen, and as a result feed intake. Despite the crude protein always being above 14%, supplementing with a high-protein feed like lupin seed stimulates animal feed intake when phenolics are high in tagasaste. Tagasaste typically has the same nutritional value as the best type of alfalfa when planted on good soil balanced in nutrients. Daily weight gains of 1 to 1.5 kg per steer per day are achieved during the growing season, with 6–10 rotations per year, typically one every 6–8 weeks.

Flowering also changes the palatability of tagasaste. In Western Australia it will commence flowering in winter (~ June). The seeds are mature and shed in early summer (first warm day in December). In the summer following flowering the palatability changes in different parts of the plant. In tagasaste that has not flowered the leaves will be grazed and bark on the stems ignored. After flowering the leaf becomes less palatable and the bark more palatable. This results in stock stripping bark off the trunk. Also the growth rate of the plant slows and leaves will be shed. The grazing management is designed to prevent flowering and keep tagasaste in the vegetative juvenile state. Trials have shown that if tagasaste is heavily grazed an or mechanically cut in the first six months of the year, it will not flower in the second half of the year. Occasionally when mechanically cutting, one limb on a plant can be missed. This limb will go on to flower, and show all the other problems, while the rest of the plant is maintained in a vegetative state.

Initially tagasaste was developed to replace hand feeding sheep during autumn in Western Australia, when feed supplies were normally very low. This involved locking the tagasaste up for 11 months and then grazing it with 100 sheep per hectare for a month. As the tagasaste grows to about 3 metres height in 11 months, it must be mechanically cut while the sheep are in the paddock. Sheep can not be set stocked on tagasaste as this can lead to plant deaths.

A breakthrough came with the discovery that cattle can be set stocked on tagasaste. Cattle tongues are too large to pick off the new shoot buds, and some leaves always remain on the plant. Sheep can remove every leaf from tagasaste but this does not cause plant deaths. The removal of new buds by sheep, which appear about six weeks after grazing, can lead to plant deaths. Today the majority of tagasaste is used for cattle grazing with plantations able to be grazed at any time of year. Though it can grow up to 5 metres in height, when managed for grazing it is kept to less than 2 metres in height.

On the poor white sands in Western Australia tagasaste has increased the animal carrying capacity from 1 to 2 dry sheep equivalents, with annual pastures to 8-10 dry sheep equivalents (~ 1 cow) per hectare with mature tagasaste. This is roughly a tenfold increase in soil fertility-based carrying capacity. The yield of edible dry matter (leaves and fine stems) in the West Midlands is mostly in the range of 3–5 tonnes per hectare. It also prevents the wind erosion and excessive ground water recharge that were major environmental problems before. Recently it has been found that tagasaste can sequester carbon at the rate of about 6 tonnes CO_{2} equivalent per hectare per year. About half the CO_{2} being stored is as organic carbon in the soil and half is in the wood of the branches, trunk and roots. Tagasaste typically yields roughly 1 ton of edible material per 100mm of rain per hectare per year.

== Tagasaste by country ==
=== Australia ===
The potential of tagasaste as a Spanish fodder was identified by Dr Perez, a medical practitioner, based on La Palma island in the Canary Islands in the 1870s, and Spanish cattle farmers. He wrote to the Spanish authorities promoting tagasaste as a fodder shrub but could not get them interested. He then sent seed to Kew Gardens in England. Kew Gardens tested tagasaste and then sent seed to all its colonies around the world. In Australia, tagasaste's potential was promoted by a number of individuals over the next century (e.g. Dr Schomburge in South Australia and Dr Laurie Snook in Western Australia) but was not adopted on a large scale until the 1980s in Western Australia.

The first 2 ha of tagasaste in the West Midlands of Western Australia was planted by John Cook on his farm near Dandaragan in 1982. The success of this small paddock excited the interest of local farmers and researchers. Before this the farming systems in the region were totally based on annual pastures and crops. The region has strongly winter dominant rainfall, with up to eight months without rain over some summers. Until the development of tagasaste it was believed it was not possible to grow perennial pastures in this region.

In 1984 the Martindale Research Project was started by the University of Western Australia with a large grant from Sir James McCusker. This project encouraged the participation of local farmers and the Western Australia Department of Agriculture in research and development. Farmers such as John Cook and Bob Wilson at Lancelin developed seeding and mechanical cutting equipment that allowed tagasaste to be sown and managed cheaply by farmers on a broadacre scale. The Martindale Research Project resolved many issues relating to agronomy, animal production and economics that resulted in a reliable package that farmers could adopt with confidence. The Western Australia Department of Agriculture also conducted trials on their Badgingarra Research Station and at Bob Wilson's farm at Lancelin. Local farmers and researchers formed the West Midlands Fodder Shrub Improvement Group. This evolved into the Evergreen Group, which expanded its interests to include a range of other shrubs, grasses and perennial legumes.

There are now about 100,000 ha of tagasaste in Western Australia. In Western Australia it is mostly grown on deep, infertile sands in regions nearer the coast with 350 to 600 mm rainfall. Most of the tagasaste in Western Australia is in the West Midlands sand plain to the north of Perth.

=== New Zealand ===
The use of tagasaste as a fodder crop was identified as early as 1897 in the Taranaki Region. As of 2011 it is still recommended as a fodder crop in some parts of the country but it also is becoming an invasive species. The Department of Conservation, a government agency responsible for protecting public conservation land, considers tagasaste to be an "environmental weed".

=== Cultivars ===
In Australia a prostrate form of tagasaste has been developed by selection, called Weeping Tagasaste. It is hoped that this plant will not require mechanical cutting or pruning. It is too early to say whether Weeping Tagasaste will yield the same production levels as that of normal tagasaste. Initial indicators are that production is lower and that the plant may be more vulnerable to soil disease.

In South Africa three eco adapted genetic lines have been trademarked: "Green Kalahari" for arid areas (300–500 mm), "Cattle Candy" for temperate areas (600–800 mm) and "Kilimanjaro" cultivar for tropical highland areas (800–3500 mm) of rain. Commercial breeding of tree lucerne cultivars have led to improved varieties with increased hardiness, disease resistance and a wider range of growing conditions and applications. The use of tree lucerne for silvopasture agroforestry as a companion crop is one example of dual use of the same land for increased production. Sheep are then used to suppress weeds and keep the tree lucerne in check, preventing it from shadowing out the main forestry crop. The biological fertilisation is enhanced with green manure and trampling, improving the soil over time, and leading to production increases.
