= Eupithecia orana =

Scientific classification
- Domain: Eukaryota
- Kingdom: Animalia
- Phylum: Arthropoda
- Class: Insecta
- Order: Lepidoptera
- Family: Geometridae
- Genus: Eupithecia
- Species: E. orana

Binomial name
- Eupithecia orana Dietze, 1913

Synonyms
- Tephroclystia pseudoscriptoria Rothschild, 1914

Species of moth

Eupithecia orana is a moth in the family Geometridae. It is found on the Canary Islands and in Spain and North Africa.
