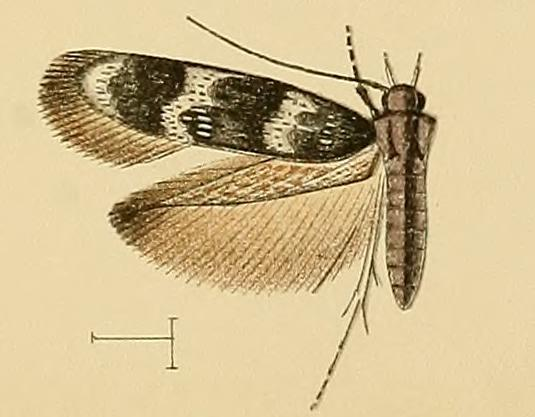

Scientific classification
- Kingdom: Animalia
- Phylum: Arthropoda
- Class: Insecta
- Order: Lepidoptera
- Family: Scythrididae
- Genus: Scythris
- Species: S. arachnodes

Binomial name
- Scythris arachnodes Walsingham, 1908

= Scythris arachnodes =

Species of moth

Scythris arachnodes is a moth of the family Scythrididae. It is found on the Canary Islands.

The wingspan is 7–10 mm. The forewings are black, with a few greyish white scales at the base and two greyish white transverse bands. The hindwings are dark leaden grey.

The larvae probably feed on lichens on the surfaces of rocks. They feed from within a web.
