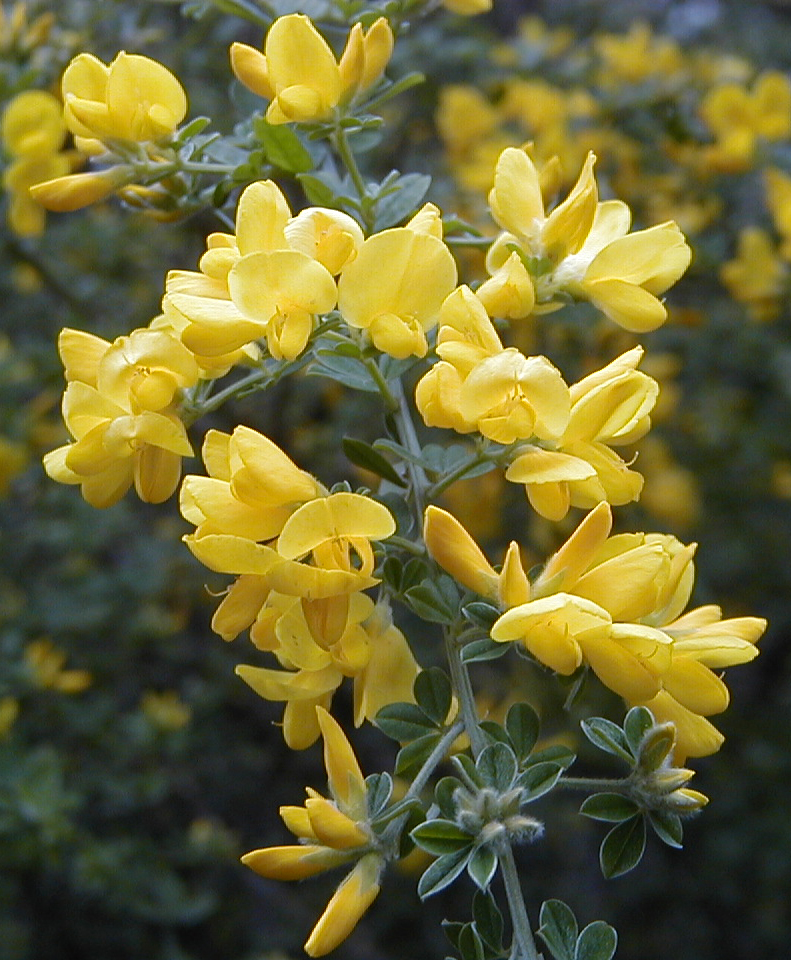

Conservation status
- Least Concern (IUCN 3.1)

Scientific classification
- Kingdom: Plantae
- Clade: Tracheophytes
- Clade: Angiosperms
- Clade: Eudicots
- Clade: Rosids
- Order: Fabales
- Family: Fabaceae
- Subfamily: Faboideae
- Genus: Genista
- Species: G. canariensis

Binomial name
- Genista canariensis L.

Synonyms
- Cytisus canariensis; Cytisus hillebrandii; Cytisus ramosissimus; Genista hillebrandii; Teline canariensis

= Genista canariensis =

Species of flowering plant

Genista canariensis is a species of flowering plant in the legume family Fabaceae, known by the common names Canary broom, Canary Islands broom or florist's genista. It is native to the Canary Islands, but it grows as an introduced species in mainland Europe, especially Spain, and on other continents. It has been introduced to California and Washington State in the US. This is a vigorous upright evergreen shrub growing to 3 m (9.8 ft) tall by 1.5 m (4.9 ft) broad, with hairy green stems. The leaves are made up of oval-shaped blue-green leaflets each up to a centimeter long and densely hairy on the undersides. The raceme inflorescence holds up to 20 bright yellow pea-like flowers. The fruit is a legume pod one to two centimeters long containing several dark brown seeds.

It is hardy down to −5 °C (23 °F), preferring mild coastal areas. In cultivation in the UK this plant has gained the Royal Horticultural Society's Award of Garden Merit.
