= List of moths of Austria (A–E) =

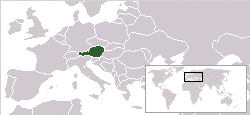
Location of Austria

The Lepidoptera of Austria consist of both the butterflies and moths recorded from Austria.

== Moths ==
=== Adelidae ===
- Adela albicinctella Mann, 1852
- Adela croesella (Scopoli, 1763)
- Adela cuprella (Denis & Schiffermüller, 1775)
- Adela homalella Staudinger, 1859
- Adela mazzolella (Hübner, 1801)
- Adela reaumurella (Linnaeus, 1758)
- Adela violella (Denis & Schiffermüller, 1775)
- Cauchas albiantennella (Burmann, 1943)
- Cauchas fibulella (Denis & Schiffermüller, 1775)
- Cauchas leucocerella (Scopoli, 1763)
- Cauchas rufifrontella (Treitschke, 1833)
- Cauchas rufimitrella (Scopoli, 1763)
- Nematopogon adansoniella (Villers, 1789)
- Nematopogon magna (Zeller, 1878)
- Nematopogon metaxella (Hübner, 1813)
- Nematopogon pilella (Denis & Schiffermüller, 1775)
- Nematopogon robertella (Clerck, 1759)
- Nematopogon schwarziellus Zeller, 1839
- Nematopogon swammerdamella (Linnaeus, 1758)
- Nemophora associatella (Zeller, 1839)
- Nemophora congruella (Zeller, 1839)
- Nemophora cupriacella (Hübner, 1819)
- Nemophora degeerella (Linnaeus, 1758)
- Nemophora dumerilella (Duponchel, 1839)
- Nemophora fasciella (Fabricius, 1775)
- Nemophora istrianellus (Heydenreich, 1851)
- Nemophora metallica (Poda, 1761)
- Nemophora minimella (Denis & Schiffermüller, 1775)
- Nemophora ochsenheimerella (Hübner, 1813)
- Nemophora pfeifferella (Hübner, 1813)
- Nemophora prodigellus (Zeller, 1853)
- Nemophora raddaella (Hübner, 1793)
- Nemophora violellus (Herrich-Schäffer in Stainton, 1851)

=== Alucitidae ===
- Alucita desmodactyla Zeller, 1847
- Alucita grammodactyla Zeller, 1841
- Alucita hexadactyla Linnaeus, 1758
- Alucita huebneri Wallengren, 1859
- Pterotopteryx dodecadactyla Hübner, 1813

=== Argyresthiidae ===
- Argyresthia abdominalis Zeller, 1839
- Argyresthia albistria (Haworth, 1828)
- Argyresthia aurulentella Stainton, 1849
- Argyresthia bonnetella (Linnaeus, 1758)
- Argyresthia brockeella (Hübner, 1813)
- Argyresthia conjugella Zeller, 1839
- Argyresthia curvella (Linnaeus, 1761)
- Argyresthia fundella (Fischer von Röslerstamm, 1835)
- Argyresthia glaucinella Zeller, 1839
- Argyresthia goedartella (Linnaeus, 1758)
- Argyresthia ivella (Haworth, 1828)
- Argyresthia pruniella (Clerck, 1759)
- Argyresthia pulchella Lienig & Zeller, 1846
- Argyresthia pygmaeella (Denis & Schiffermüller, 1775)
- Argyresthia retinella Zeller, 1839
- Argyresthia semifusca (Haworth, 1828)
- Argyresthia semitestacella (Curtis, 1833)
- Argyresthia sorbiella (Treitschke, 1833)
- Argyresthia spinosella Stainton, 1849
- Argyresthia submontana Frey, 1871
- Argyresthia tarmanni Gibeaux, 1993
- Argyresthia amiantella (Zeller, 1847)
- Argyresthia arceuthina Zeller, 1839
- Argyresthia bergiella (Ratzeburg, 1840)
- Argyresthia dilectella Zeller, 1847
- Argyresthia glabratella (Zeller, 1847)
- Argyresthia illuminatella Zeller, 1839
- Argyresthia laevigatella Herrich-Schäffer, 1855
- Argyresthia praecocella Zeller, 1839
- Argyresthia thuiella (Packard, 1871)
- Argyresthia trifasciata Staudinger, 1871

=== Autostichidae ===
- Apatema mediopallidum Walsingham, 1900
- Apatema whalleyi (Popescu-Gorj & Capuse, 1965)
- Deroxena venosulella (Moschler, 1862)
- Holcopogon bubulcellus (Staudinger, 1859)
- Oegoconia caradjai Popescu-Gorj & Capuse, 1965
- Oegoconia deauratella (Herrich-Schäffer, 1854)
- Oegoconia novimundi (Busck, 1915)
- Oegoconia quadripuncta (Haworth, 1828)
- Oegoconia uralskella Popescu-Gorj & Capuse, 1965
- Symmoca achrestella Rebel, 1889
- Symmoca caliginella Mann, 1867
- Symmoca dolomitana Huemer & Gozmany, 1992
- Symmoca signella (Hübner, 1796)

=== Batrachedridae ===
- Batrachedra pinicolella (Zeller, 1839)
- Batrachedra praeangusta (Haworth, 1828)

=== Bedelliidae ===
- Bedellia somnulentella (Zeller, 1847)

=== Blastobasidae ===
- Blastobasis huemeri Sinev, 1993
- Blastobasis phycidella (Zeller, 1839)
- Hypatopa binotella (Thunberg, 1794)
- Hypatopa inunctella Zeller, 1839
- Hypatopa segnella (Zeller, 1873)

=== Brachodidae ===
- Brachodes appendiculata (Esper, 1783)
- Brachodes pumila (Ochsenheimer, 1808)

=== Brahmaeidae ===
- Lemonia dumi (Linnaeus, 1761)
- Lemonia taraxaci (Denis & Schiffermüller, 1775)

=== Bucculatricidae ===
- Bucculatrix absinthii Gartner, 1865
- Bucculatrix albedinella (Zeller, 1839)
- Bucculatrix alpina Frey, 1870
- Bucculatrix argentisignella Herrich-Schäffer, 1855
- Bucculatrix artemisiella Herrich-Schäffer, 1855
- Bucculatrix atagina Wocke, 1876
- Bucculatrix bechsteinella (Bechstein & Scharfenberg, 1805)
- Bucculatrix cidarella (Zeller, 1839)
- Bucculatrix clavenae Klimesch, 1950
- Bucculatrix cristatella (Zeller, 1839)
- Bucculatrix demaryella (Duponchel, 1840)
- Bucculatrix fatigatella Heyden, 1863
- Bucculatrix frangutella (Goeze, 1783)
- Bucculatrix gnaphaliella (Treitschke, 1833)
- Bucculatrix herbalbella Chretien, 1915
- Bucculatrix maritima Stainton, 1851
- Bucculatrix nigricomella (Zeller, 1839)
- Bucculatrix noltei Petry, 1912
- Bucculatrix pannonica Deschka, 1982
- Bucculatrix ratisbonensis Stainton, 1861
- Bucculatrix thoracella (Thunberg, 1794)
- Bucculatrix ulmella Zeller, 1848
- Bucculatrix ulmifoliae M. Hering, 1931

=== Carposinidae ===
- Carposina berberidella Herrich-Schäffer, 1854
- Carposina scirrhosella Herrich-Schäffer, 1854

=== Chimabachidae ===
- Dasystoma salicella (Hübner, 1796)
- Diurnea fagella (Denis & Schiffermüller, 1775)
- Diurnea lipsiella (Denis & Schiffermüller, 1775)

=== Choreutidae ===
- Anthophila abhasica Danilevsky, 1969
- Anthophila fabriciana (Linnaeus, 1767)
- Choreutis diana (Hübner, 1822)
- Choreutis nemorana (Hübner, 1799)
- Choreutis pariana (Clerck, 1759)
- Prochoreutis holotoxa (Meyrick, 1903)
- Prochoreutis myllerana (Fabricius, 1794)
- Prochoreutis sehestediana (Fabricius, 1776)
- Prochoreutis stellaris (Zeller, 1847)
- Tebenna bjerkandrella (Thunberg, 1784)

=== Coleophoridae ===
- Augasma aeratella (Zeller, 1839)
- Coleophora achaenivora Hofmann, 1877
- Coleophora acrisella Milliere, 1872
- Coleophora adjectella Hering, 1937
- Coleophora adjunctella Hodgkinson, 1882
- Coleophora adspersella Benander, 1939
- Coleophora ahenella Heinemann, 1877
- Coleophora albella (Thunberg, 1788)
- Coleophora albicans Zeller, 1849
- Coleophora albicostella (Duponchel, 1842)
- Coleophora albidella (Denis & Schiffermüller, 1775)
- Coleophora albilineella Toll, 1960
- Coleophora albitarsella Zeller, 1849
- Coleophora alcyonipennella (Kollar, 1832)
- Coleophora aleramica Baldizzone & Stubner, 2007
- Coleophora alnifoliae Barasch, 1934
- Coleophora alticolella Zeller, 1849
- Coleophora altivagella Toll, 1952
- Coleophora amellivora Baldizzone, 1979
- Coleophora anatipenella (Hübner, 1796)
- Coleophora antennariella Herrich-Schäffer, 1861
- Coleophora argentula (Stephens, 1834)
- Coleophora artemisicolella Bruand, 1855
- Coleophora asteris Muhlig, 1864
- Coleophora astragalella Zeller, 1849
- Coleophora auricella (Fabricius, 1794)
- Coleophora autumnella (Duponchel, 1843)
- Coleophora badiipennella (Duponchel, 1843)
- Coleophora ballotella (Fischer v. Röslerstamm, 1839)
- Coleophora betulella Heinemann, 1877
- Coleophora bilineatella Zeller, 1849
- Coleophora bilineella Herrich-Schäffer, 1855
- Coleophora binderella (Kollar, 1832)
- Coleophora brevipalpella Wocke, 1874
- Coleophora burmanni Toll, 1952
- Coleophora caelebipennella Zeller, 1839
- Coleophora caespititiella Zeller, 1839
- Coleophora campestriphaga Baldizzone & Patzak, 1980
- Coleophora cecidophorella Oudejans, 1972
- Coleophora chamaedriella Bruand, 1852
- Coleophora chrysanthemi Hofmann, 1869
- Coleophora ciconiella Herrich-Schäffer, 1855
- Coleophora clypeiferella Hofmann, 1871
- Coleophora colutella (Fabricius, 1794)
- Coleophora congeriella Staudinger, 1859
- Coleophora conspicuella Zeller, 1849
- Coleophora conyzae Zeller, 1868
- Coleophora coracipennella (Hübner, 1796)
- Coleophora cornutella Herrich-Schäffer, 1861
- Coleophora coronillae Zeller, 1849
- Coleophora currucipennella Zeller, 1839
- Coleophora deauratella Lienig & Zeller, 1846
- Coleophora dentiferella Toll, 1952
- Coleophora derasofasciella Klimesch, 1952
- Coleophora dianthi Herrich-Schäffer, 1855
- Coleophora dignella Toll, 1961
- Coleophora directella Zeller, 1849
- Coleophora discordella Zeller, 1849
- Coleophora ditella Zeller, 1849
- Coleophora flaviella Mann, 1857
- Coleophora flavipennella (Duponchel, 1843)
- Coleophora follicularis (Vallot, 1802)
- Coleophora frankii Schmidt, 1886
- Coleophora fringillella Zeller, 1839
- Coleophora frischella (Linnaeus, 1758)
- Coleophora fuscociliella Zeller, 1849
- Coleophora fuscocuprella Herrich-Schäffer, 1855
- Coleophora galbulipennella Zeller, 1838
- Coleophora gallipennella (Hübner, 1796)
- Coleophora gardesanella Toll, 1954
- Coleophora genistae Stainton, 1857
- Coleophora glaseri Toll, 1961
- Coleophora glaucicolella Wood, 1892
- Coleophora glitzella Hofmann, 1869
- Coleophora granulatella Zeller, 1849
- Coleophora gryphipennella (Hübner, 1796)
- Coleophora halophilella Zimmermann, 1926
- Coleophora hartigi Toll, 1944
- Coleophora hemerobiella (Scopoli, 1763)
- Coleophora hungariae Gozmany, 1955
- Coleophora hydrolapathella Hering, 1921
- Coleophora ibipennella Zeller, 1849
- Coleophora idaeella Hofmann, 1869
- Coleophora inulae Wocke, 1877
- Coleophora juncicolella Stainton, 1851
- Coleophora kroneella Fuchs, 1899
- Coleophora kuehnella (Goeze, 1783)
- Coleophora laricella (Hübner, 1817)
- Coleophora ledi Stainton, 1860
- Coleophora limosipennella (Duponchel, 1843)
- Coleophora lineolea (Haworth, 1828)
- Coleophora linosyris Hering, 1937
- Coleophora lithargyrinella Zeller, 1849
- Coleophora lixella Zeller, 1849
- Coleophora longicornella Constant, 1893
- Coleophora lusciniaepennella (Treitschke, 1833)
- Coleophora lutipennella (Zeller, 1838)
- Coleophora mayrella (Hübner, 1813)
- Coleophora medelichensis Krone, 1908
- Coleophora meridionella Rebel, 1912
- Coleophora millefolii Zeller, 1849
- Coleophora milvipennis Zeller, 1839
- Coleophora motacillella Zeller, 1849
- Coleophora niveiciliella Hofmann, 1877
- Coleophora niveicostella Zeller, 1839
- Coleophora niveistrigella Wocke, 1877
- Coleophora nubivagella Zeller, 1849
- Coleophora nutantella Muhlig & Frey, 1857
- Coleophora obscenella Herrich-Schäffer, 1855
- Coleophora obtectella Zeller, 1849
- Coleophora obviella Rebel, 1914
- Coleophora ochrea (Haworth, 1828)
- Coleophora ochripennella Zeller, 1849
- Coleophora odorariella Muhlig, 1857
- Coleophora onobrychiella Zeller, 1849
- Coleophora ononidella Milliere, 1879
- Coleophora onopordiella Zeller, 1849
- Coleophora orbitella Zeller, 1849
- Coleophora oriolella Zeller, 1849
- Coleophora ornatipennella (Hübner, 1796)
- Coleophora otidipennella (Hübner, 1817)
- Coleophora pappiferella Hofmann, 1869
- Coleophora paradrymidis Toll, 1949
- Coleophora paripennella Zeller, 1839
- Coleophora partitella Zeller, 1849
- Coleophora peisoniella Kasy, 1965
- Coleophora pennella (Denis & Schiffermüller, 1775)
- Coleophora pratella Zeller, 1871
- Coleophora preisseckeri Toll, 1942
- Coleophora prunifoliae Doets, 1944
- Coleophora pseudociconiella Toll, 1952
- Coleophora pseudoditella Baldizzone & Patzak, 1983
- Coleophora pseudolinosyris Kasy, 1979
- Coleophora pseudorepentis Toll, 1960
- Coleophora ptarmicia Walsingham, 1910
- Coleophora pulmonariella Ragonot, 1874
- Coleophora pyrrhulipennella Zeller, 1839
- Coleophora ramosella Zeller, 1849
- Coleophora rectilineella Fischer v. Röslerstamm, 1843
- Coleophora repentis Klimesch, 1947
- Coleophora riffelensis Rebel, 1913
- Coleophora salicorniae Heinemann & Wocke, 1877
- Coleophora saponariella Heeger, 1848
- Coleophora saturatella Stainton, 1850
- Coleophora saxicolella (Duponchel, 1843)
- Coleophora sergiella Falkovitsh, 1979
- Coleophora serpylletorum Hering, 1889
- Coleophora serratella (Linnaeus, 1761)
- Coleophora serratulella Herrich-Schäffer, 1855
- Coleophora settarii Wocke, 1877
- Coleophora siccifolia Stainton, 1856
- Coleophora silenella Herrich-Schäffer, 1855
- Coleophora solitariella Zeller, 1849
- Coleophora spinella (Schrank, 1802)
- Coleophora spiraeella Rebel, 1916
- Coleophora squalorella Zeller, 1849
- Coleophora squamella Constant, 1885
- Coleophora squamosella Stainton, 1856
- Coleophora sternipennella (Zetterstedt, 1839)
- Coleophora stramentella Zeller, 1849
- Coleophora striatipennella Nylander in Tengstrom, 1848
- Coleophora succursella Herrich-Schäffer, 1855
- Coleophora supinella Ortner, 1949
- Coleophora svenssoni Baldizzone, 1985
- Coleophora sylvaticella Wood, 1892
- Coleophora taeniipennella Herrich-Schäffer, 1855
- Coleophora tamesis Waters, 1929
- Coleophora tanaceti Muhlig, 1865
- Coleophora therinella Tengstrom, 1848
- Coleophora thymi Hering, 1942
- Coleophora tolli Klimesch, 1951
- Coleophora trifariella Zeller, 1849
- Coleophora trifolii (Curtis, 1832)
- Coleophora trigeminella Fuchs, 1881
- Coleophora trochilella (Duponchel, 1843)
- Coleophora uliginosella Glitz, 1872
- Coleophora unigenella Svensson, 1966
- Coleophora unipunctella Zeller, 1849
- Coleophora vacciniella Herrich-Schäffer, 1861
- Coleophora valesianella Zeller, 1849
- Coleophora versurella Zeller, 1849
- Coleophora vestianella (Linnaeus, 1758)
- Coleophora vibicella (Hübner, 1813)
- Coleophora vibicigerella Zeller, 1839
- Coleophora vicinella Zeller, 1849
- Coleophora violacea (Strom, 1783)
- Coleophora virgatella Zeller, 1849
- Coleophora virgaureae Stainton, 1857
- Coleophora vitisella Gregson, 1856
- Coleophora vulnerariae Zeller, 1839
- Coleophora vulpecula Zeller, 1849
- Coleophora wockeella Zeller, 1849
- Coleophora zelleriella Heinemann, 1854
- Goniodoma auroguttella (Fischer v. Röslerstamm, 1841)
- Metriotes lutarea (Haworth, 1828)

=== Cosmopterigidae ===
- Ascalenia vanella (Frey, 1860)
- Cosmopterix lienigiella Zeller, 1846
- Cosmopterix orichalcea Stainton, 1861
- Cosmopterix schmidiella Frey, 1856
- Cosmopterix scribaiella Zeller, 1850
- Cosmopterix zieglerella (Hübner, 1810)
- Eteobalea albiapicella (Duponchel, 1843)
- Eteobalea anonymella (Riedl, 1965)
- Eteobalea intermediella (Riedl, 1966)
- Eteobalea serratella (Treitschke, 1833)
- Eteobalea tririvella (Staudinger, 1870)
- Isidiella nickerlii (Nickerl, 1864)
- Limnaecia phragmitella Stainton, 1851
- Pancalia leuwenhoekella (Linnaeus, 1761)
- Pancalia nodosella (Bruand, 1851)
- Pancalia schwarzella (Fabricius, 1798)
- Pyroderces argyrogrammos (Zeller, 1847)
- Pyroderces klimeschi Rebel, 1938
- Sorhagenia janiszewskae Riedl, 1962
- Sorhagenia lophyrella (Douglas, 1846)
- Sorhagenia rhamniella (Zeller, 1839)
- Stagmatophora heydeniella (Fischer von Röslerstamm, 1838)
- Vulcaniella extremella (Wocke, 1871)
- Vulcaniella pomposella (Zeller, 1839)

=== Cossidae ===
- Acossus terebra (Denis & Schiffermüller, 1775)
- Cossus cossus (Linnaeus, 1758)
- Dyspessa ulula (Borkhausen, 1790)
- Parahypopta caestrum (Hübner, 1808)
- Phragmataecia castaneae (Hübner, 1790)
- Zeuzera pyrina (Linnaeus, 1761)

=== Crambidae ===
- Acentria ephemerella (Denis & Schiffermüller, 1775)
- Agriphila biarmicus (Tengstrom, 1865)
- Agriphila deliella (Hübner, 1813)
- Agriphila geniculea (Haworth, 1811)
- Agriphila hungaricus (A. Schmidt, 1909)
- Agriphila inquinatella (Denis & Schiffermüller, 1775)
- Agriphila poliellus (Treitschke, 1832)
- Agriphila selasella (Hübner, 1813)
- Agriphila straminella (Denis & Schiffermüller, 1775)
- Agriphila tolli (Błeszyński, 1952)
- Agriphila tristella (Denis & Schiffermüller, 1775)
- Agrotera nemoralis (Scopoli, 1763)
- Anania coronata (Hufnagel, 1767)
- Anania crocealis (Hübner, 1796)
- Anania funebris (Strom, 1768)
- Anania fuscalis (Denis & Schiffermüller, 1775)
- Anania hortulata (Linnaeus, 1758)
- Anania lancealis (Denis & Schiffermüller, 1775)
- Anania luctualis (Hübner, 1793)
- Anania perlucidalis (Hübner, 1809)
- Anania stachydalis (Germar, 1821)
- Anania terrealis (Treitschke, 1829)
- Anania testacealis (Zeller, 1847)
- Anania verbascalis (Denis & Schiffermüller, 1775)
- Ancylolomia palpella (Denis & Schiffermüller, 1775)
- Aporodes floralis (Hübner, 1809)
- Atralata albofascialis (Treitschke, 1829)
- Calamotropha aureliellus (Fischer v. Röslerstamm, 1841)
- Calamotropha paludella (Hübner, 1824)
- Cataclysta lemnata (Linnaeus, 1758)
- Catharia pyrenaealis (Duponchel, 1843)
- Catharia simplonialis (Heydenreich, 1851)
- Catoptria combinella (Denis & Schiffermüller, 1775)
- Catoptria conchella (Denis & Schiffermüller, 1775)
- Catoptria confusellus (Staudinger, 1882)
- Catoptria falsella (Denis & Schiffermüller, 1775)
- Catoptria fulgidella (Hübner, 1813)
- Catoptria furcatellus (Zetterstedt, 1839)
- Catoptria languidellus (Zeller, 1863)
- Catoptria luctiferella (Hübner, 1813)
- Catoptria lythargyrella (Hübner, 1796)
- Catoptria maculalis (Zetterstedt, 1839)
- Catoptria margaritella (Denis & Schiffermüller, 1775)
- Catoptria myella (Hübner, 1796)
- Catoptria mytilella (Hübner, 1805)
- Catoptria osthelderi (Lattin, 1950)
- Catoptria permutatellus (Herrich-Schäffer, 1848)
- Catoptria petrificella (Hübner, 1796)
- Catoptria pinella (Linnaeus, 1758)
- Catoptria pyramidellus (Treitschke, 1832)
- Catoptria speculalis Hübner, 1825
- Catoptria verellus (Zincken, 1817)
- Chilo phragmitella (Hübner, 1805)
- Cholius luteolaris (Scopoli, 1772)
- Chrysocrambus craterella (Scopoli, 1763)
- Chrysocrambus linetella (Fabricius, 1781)
- Chrysoteuchia culmella (Linnaeus, 1758)
- Cornifrons ulceratalis Lederer, 1858
- Crambus alienellus Germar & Kaulfuss, 1817
- Crambus ericella (Hübner, 1813)
- Crambus hamella (Thunberg, 1788)
- Crambus lathoniellus (Zincken, 1817)
- Crambus pascuella (Linnaeus, 1758)
- Crambus perlella (Scopoli, 1763)
- Crambus pratella (Linnaeus, 1758)
- Crambus silvella (Hübner, 1813)
- Crambus uliginosellus Zeller, 1850
- Cynaeda dentalis (Denis & Schiffermüller, 1775)
- Diasemia reticularis (Linnaeus, 1761)
- Diasemiopsis ramburialis (Duponchel, 1834)
- Dolicharthria punctalis (Denis & Schiffermüller, 1775)
- Dolicharthria stigmosalis (Herrich-Schäffer, 1848)
- Donacaula forficella (Thunberg, 1794)
- Donacaula mucronella (Denis & Schiffermüller, 1775)
- Ecpyrrhorrhoe rubiginalis (Hübner, 1796)
- Elophila nymphaeata (Linnaeus, 1758)
- Elophila rivulalis (Duponchel, 1834)
- Epascestria pustulalis (Hübner, 1823)
- Euchromius ocellea (Haworth, 1811)
- Eudonia delunella (Stainton, 1849)
- Eudonia lacustrata (Panzer, 1804)
- Eudonia laetella (Zeller, 1846)
- Eudonia mercurella (Linnaeus, 1758)
- Eudonia murana (Curtis, 1827)
- Eudonia pallida (Curtis, 1827)
- Eudonia petrophila (Standfuss, 1848)
- Eudonia phaeoleuca (Zeller, 1846)
- Eudonia sudetica (Zeller, 1839)
- Eudonia truncicolella (Stainton, 1849)
- Eudonia vallesialis (Duponchel, 1832)
- Eurrhypis pollinalis (Denis & Schiffermüller, 1775)
- Evergestis aenealis (Denis & Schiffermüller, 1775)
- Evergestis extimalis (Scopoli, 1763)
- Evergestis forficalis (Linnaeus, 1758)
- Evergestis frumentalis (Linnaeus, 1761)
- Evergestis limbata (Linnaeus, 1767)
- Evergestis pallidata (Hufnagel, 1767)
- Evergestis politalis (Denis & Schiffermüller, 1775)
- Evergestis sophialis (Fabricius, 1787)
- Friedlanderia cicatricella (Hübner, 1824)
- Gesneria centuriella (Denis & Schiffermüller, 1775)
- Heliothela wulfeniana (Scopoli, 1763)
- Hellula undalis (Fabricius, 1781)
- Loxostege deliblatica Szent-Ivany & Uhrik-Meszaros, 1942
- Loxostege fascialis (Hübner, 1796)
- Loxostege manualis (Geyer, 1832)
- Loxostege sticticalis (Linnaeus, 1761)
- Loxostege turbidalis (Treitschke, 1829)
- Loxostege virescalis (Guenee, 1854)
- Mecyna flavalis (Denis & Schiffermüller, 1775)
- Mecyna lutealis (Duponchel, 1833)
- Mecyna trinalis (Denis & Schiffermüller, 1775)
- Metasia carnealis (Treitschke, 1829)
- Metasia ophialis (Treitschke, 1829)
- Metaxmeste phrygialis (Hübner, 1796)
- Metaxmeste schrankiana (Hochenwarth, 1785)
- Nascia cilialis (Hübner, 1796)
- Nomophila noctuella (Denis & Schiffermüller, 1775)
- Nymphula nitidulata (Hufnagel, 1767)
- Orenaia alpestralis (Fabricius, 1787)
- Orenaia andereggialis (Herrich-Schäffer, 1851)
- Orenaia helveticalis (Herrich-Schäffer, 1851)
- Orenaia lugubralis (Lederer, 1857)
- Ostrinia nubilalis (Hübner, 1796)
- Ostrinia palustralis (Hübner, 1796)
- Ostrinia quadripunctalis (Denis & Schiffermüller, 1775)
- Palpita vitrealis (Rossi, 1794)
- Paracorsia repandalis (Denis & Schiffermüller, 1775)
- Parapoynx nivalis (Denis & Schiffermüller, 1775)
- Parapoynx stratiotata (Linnaeus, 1758)
- Paratalanta hyalinalis (Hübner, 1796)
- Paratalanta pandalis (Hübner, 1825)
- Pediasia aridella (Thunberg, 1788)
- Pediasia contaminella (Hübner, 1796)
- Pediasia fascelinella (Hübner, 1813)
- Pediasia luteella (Denis & Schiffermüller, 1775)
- Pediasia matricella (Treitschke, 1832)
- Pediasia pedriolellus (Duponchel, 1836)
- Platytes alpinella (Hübner, 1813)
- Platytes cerussella (Denis & Schiffermüller, 1775)
- Pleuroptya ruralis (Scopoli, 1763)
- Psammotis pulveralis (Hübner, 1796)
- Pyrausta aerealis (Hübner, 1793)
- Pyrausta aurata (Scopoli, 1763)
- Pyrausta cingulata (Linnaeus, 1758)
- Pyrausta coracinalis Leraut, 1982
- Pyrausta despicata (Scopoli, 1763)
- Pyrausta falcatalis Guenee, 1854
- Pyrausta nigrata (Scopoli, 1763)
- Pyrausta obfuscata (Scopoli, 1763)
- Pyrausta ostrinalis (Hübner, 1796)
- Pyrausta porphyralis (Denis & Schiffermüller, 1775)
- Pyrausta purpuralis (Linnaeus, 1758)
- Pyrausta sanguinalis (Linnaeus, 1767)
- Pyrausta virginalis Duponchel, 1832
- Schoenobius gigantella (Denis & Schiffermüller, 1775)
- Scirpophaga praelata (Scopoli, 1763)
- Sclerocona acutella (Eversmann, 1842)
- Scoparia ambigualis (Treitschke, 1829)
- Scoparia ancipitella (La Harpe, 1855)
- Scoparia basistrigalis Knaggs, 1866
- Scoparia conicella (La Harpe, 1863)
- Scoparia ingratella (Zeller, 1846)
- Scoparia italica Turati, 1919
- Scoparia manifestella (Herrich-Schäffer, 1848)
- Scoparia pyralella (Denis & Schiffermüller, 1775)
- Scoparia subfusca Haworth, 1811
- Sitochroa palealis (Denis & Schiffermüller, 1775)
- Sitochroa verticalis (Linnaeus, 1758)
- Talis quercella (Denis & Schiffermüller, 1775)
- Thisanotia chrysonuchella (Scopoli, 1763)
- Titanio normalis (Hübner, 1796)
- Udea accolalis (Zeller, 1867)
- Udea alpinalis (Denis & Schiffermüller, 1775)
- Udea austriacalis (Herrich-Schäffer, 1851)
- Udea carniolica Huemer & Tarmann, 1989
- Udea cyanalis (La Harpe, 1855)
- Udea decrepitalis (Herrich-Schäffer, 1848)
- Udea elutalis (Denis & Schiffermüller, 1775)
- Udea ferrugalis (Hübner, 1796)
- Udea fulvalis (Hübner, 1809)
- Udea hamalis (Thunberg, 1788)
- Udea inquinatalis (Lienig & Zeller, 1846)
- Udea lutealis (Hübner, 1809)
- Udea murinalis (Fischer v. Röslerstamm, 1842)
- Udea nebulalis (Hübner, 1796)
- Udea olivalis (Denis & Schiffermüller, 1775)
- Udea prunalis (Denis & Schiffermüller, 1775)
- Udea rhododendronalis (Duponchel, 1834)
- Udea uliginosalis (Stephens, 1834)
- Uresiphita gilvata (Fabricius, 1794)
- Xanthocrambus lucellus (Herrich-Schäffer, 1848)
- Xanthocrambus saxonellus (Zincken, 1821)

=== Douglasiidae ===
- Klimeschia transversella (Zeller, 1839)
- Tinagma anchusella (Benander, 1936)
- Tinagma balteolella (Fischer von Röslerstamm, 1841)
- Tinagma dryadis Staudinger, 1872
- Tinagma hedemanni (Caradja, 1920)
- Tinagma ocnerostomella (Stainton, 1850)
- Tinagma perdicella Zeller, 1839
- Tinagma signatum Gaedike, 1991

=== Drepanidae ===
- Achlya flavicornis (Linnaeus, 1758)
- Asphalia ruficollis (Denis & Schiffermüller, 1775)
- Cilix glaucata (Scopoli, 1763)
- Cymatophorina diluta (Denis & Schiffermüller, 1775)
- Drepana curvatula (Borkhausen, 1790)
- Drepana falcataria (Linnaeus, 1758)
- Falcaria lacertinaria (Linnaeus, 1758)
- Habrosyne pyritoides (Hufnagel, 1766)
- Ochropacha duplaris (Linnaeus, 1761)
- Polyploca ridens (Fabricius, 1787)
- Sabra harpagula (Esper, 1786)
- Tethea ocularis (Linnaeus, 1767)
- Tethea or (Denis & Schiffermüller, 1775)
- Tetheella fluctuosa (Hübner, 1803)
- Thyatira batis (Linnaeus, 1758)
- Watsonalla binaria (Hufnagel, 1767)
- Watsonalla cultraria (Fabricius, 1775)

=== Elachistidae ===
- Agonopterix adspersella (Kollar, 1832)
- Agonopterix alpigena (Frey, 1870)
- Agonopterix alstromeriana (Clerck, 1759)
- Agonopterix angelicella (Hübner, 1813)
- Agonopterix arenella (Denis & Schiffermüller, 1775)
- Agonopterix assimilella (Treitschke, 1832)
- Agonopterix astrantiae (Heinemann, 1870)
- Agonopterix atomella (Denis & Schiffermüller, 1775)
- Agonopterix capreolella (Zeller, 1839)
- Agonopterix carduella (Hübner, 1817)
- Agonopterix cervariella (Constant, 1884)
- Agonopterix ciliella (Stainton, 1849)
- Agonopterix cluniana Huemer & Lvovsky, 2000
- Agonopterix cnicella (Treitschke, 1832)
- Agonopterix conterminella (Zeller, 1839)
- Agonopterix curvipunctosa (Haworth, 1811)
- Agonopterix doronicella (Wocke, 1849)
- Agonopterix furvella (Treitschke, 1832)
- Agonopterix heracliana (Linnaeus, 1758)
- Agonopterix hippomarathri (Nickerl, 1864)
- Agonopterix hypericella (Hübner, 1817)
- Agonopterix kaekeritziana (Linnaeus, 1767)
- Agonopterix laterella (Denis & Schiffermüller, 1775)
- Agonopterix liturosa (Haworth, 1811)
- Agonopterix multiplicella (Erschoff, 1877)
- Agonopterix nanatella (Stainton, 1849)
- Agonopterix nervosa (Haworth, 1811)
- Agonopterix ocellana (Fabricius, 1775)
- Agonopterix oinochroa (Turati, 1879)
- Agonopterix pallorella (Zeller, 1839)
- Agonopterix parilella (Treitschke, 1835)
- Agonopterix petasitis (Standfuss, 1851)
- Agonopterix propinquella (Treitschke, 1835)
- Agonopterix pupillana (Wocke, 1887)
- Agonopterix purpurea (Haworth, 1811)
- Agonopterix putridella (Denis & Schiffermüller, 1775)
- Agonopterix rotundella (Douglas, 1846)
- Agonopterix scopariella (Heinemann, 1870)
- Agonopterix selini (Heinemann, 1870)
- Agonopterix senecionis (Nickerl, 1864)
- Agonopterix silerella (Stainton, 1865)
- Agonopterix subpropinquella (Stainton, 1849)
- Agonopterix yeatiana (Fabricius, 1781)
- Anchinia cristalis (Scopoli, 1763)
- Anchinia daphnella (Denis & Schiffermüller, 1775)
- Anchinia grisescens Frey, 1856
- Anchinia laureolella Herrich-Schäffer, 1854
- Blastodacna atra (Haworth, 1828)
- Blastodacna hellerella (Duponchel, 1838)
- Cacochroa permixtella (Herrich-Schäffer, 1854)
- Chrysoclista lathamella (T. B. Fletcher, 1936)
- Chrysoclista linneella (Clerck, 1759)
- Chrysoclista splendida Karsholt, 1997
- Depressaria absynthiella Herrich-Schäffer, 1865
- Depressaria albipunctella (Denis & Schiffermüller, 1775)
- Depressaria artemisiae Nickerl, 1864
- Depressaria badiella (Hübner, 1796)
- Depressaria beckmanni Heinemann, 1870
- Depressaria bupleurella Heinemann, 1870
- Depressaria cervicella Herrich-Schäffer, 1854
- Depressaria chaerophylli Zeller, 1839
- Depressaria daucella (Denis & Schiffermüller, 1775)
- Depressaria daucivorella Ragonot, 1889
- Depressaria depressana (Fabricius, 1775)
- Depressaria douglasella Stainton, 1849
- Depressaria emeritella Stainton, 1849
- Depressaria heydenii Zeller, 1854
- Depressaria hofmanni Stainton, 1861
- Depressaria lacticapitella Klimesch, 1942
- Depressaria leucocephala Snellen, 1884
- Depressaria libanotidella Schlager, 1849
- Depressaria olerella Zeller, 1854
- Depressaria pimpinellae Zeller, 1839
- Depressaria pulcherrimella Stainton, 1849
- Depressaria radiella (Goeze, 1783)
- Depressaria silesiaca Heinemann, 1870
- Depressaria sordidatella Tengstrom, 1848
- Depressaria ultimella Stainton, 1849
- Depressaria dictamnella (Treitschke, 1835)
- Dystebenna stephensi (Stainton, 1849)
- Elachista adscitella Stainton, 1851
- Elachista argentella (Clerck, 1759)
- Elachista atrisquamosa Staudinger, 1880
- Elachista baldizzonei Traugott-Olsen, 1996
- Elachista baldizzonella Traugott-Olsen, 1985
- Elachista bedellella (Sircom, 1848)
- Elachista bisulcella (Duponchel, 1843)
- Elachista chrysodesmella Zeller, 1850
- Elachista cingillella (Herrich-Schäffer, 1855)
- Elachista collitella (Duponchel, 1843)
- Elachista dalmatiensis Traugott-Olsen, 1992
- Elachista dispilella Zeller, 1839
- Elachista dispunctella (Duponchel, 1843)
- Elachista festucicolella Zeller, 1859
- Elachista gangabella Zeller, 1850
- Elachista grandella Traugott-Olsen, 1992
- Elachista gregori Traugott-Olsen, 1988
- Elachista hallini Traugott-Olsen, 1992
- Elachista hedemanni Rebel, 1899
- Elachista heinemanni Frey, 1866
- Elachista heringi Rebel, 1899
- Elachista imbi Traugott-Olsen, 1992
- Elachista intrigella Traugott-Olsen, 1992
- Elachista karsholti Traugott-Olsen, 1992
- Elachista klimeschiella Parenti, 2002
- Elachista lugdunensis Frey, 1859
- Elachista mannella Traugott-Olsen, 1992
- Elachista manni Traugott-Olsen, 1990
- Elachista metella Kaila, 2002
- Elachista multipunctella Traugott-Olsen, 1992
- Elachista nielspederi Traugott-Olsen, 1992
- Elachista nitidulella (Herrich-Schäffer, 1885)
- Elachista nolckeni Sulcs, 1992
- Elachista nuraghella Amsel, 1951
- Elachista obliquella Stainton, 1854
- Elachista occulta Parenti, 1978
- Elachista pocopunctella Traugott-Olsen, 1992
- Elachista pollinariella Zeller, 1839
- Elachista pollutella Duponchel, 1843
- Elachista pullicomella Zeller, 1839
- Elachista punctella Traugott-Olsen, 1992
- Elachista revinctella Zeller, 1850
- Elachista rudectella Stainton, 1851
- Elachista spumella Caradja, 1920
- Elachista squamosella (Duponchel, 1843)
- Elachista subalbidella Schlager, 1847
- Elachista subocellea (Stephens, 1834)
- Elachista svenssoni Traugott-Olsen, 1988
- Elachista triatomea (Haworth, 1828)
- Elachista triseriatella Stainton, 1854
- Elachista unifasciella (Haworth, 1828)
- Elachista vanderwolfi Traugott-Olsen, 1992
- Elachista kalki Parenti, 1978
- Elachista albicapilla Hofner, 1918
- Elachista albidella Nylander, 1848
- Elachista albifrontella (Hübner, 1817)
- Elachista alpinella Stainton, 1854
- Elachista anserinella Zeller, 1839
- Elachista apicipunctella Stainton, 1849
- Elachista argentifasciella Hofner, 1898
- Elachista atricomella Stainton, 1849
- Elachista biatomella (Stainton, 1848)
- Elachista bifasciella Treitschke, 1833
- Elachista brachypterella (Klimesch, 1990)
- Elachista canapennella (Hübner, 1813)
- Elachista cinereopunctella (Haworth, 1828)
- Elachista compsa Traugott-Olsen, 1974
- Elachista consortella Stainton, 1851
- Elachista contaminatella Zeller, 1847
- Elachista diederichsiella E. Hering, 1889
- Elachista dimicatella Rebel, 1903
- Elachista elegans Frey, 1859
- Elachista eleochariella Stainton, 1851
- Elachista exactella (Herrich-Schäffer, 1855)
- Elachista excelsicola Braun, 1948
- Elachista freyerella (Hübner, 1825)
- Elachista geminatella (Herrich-Schäffer, 1855)
- Elachista gleichenella (Fabricius, 1781)
- Elachista griseella (Duponchel, 1843)
- Elachista herrichii Frey, 1859
- Elachista humilis Zeller, 1850
- Elachista juliensis Frey, 1870
- Elachista kilmunella Stainton, 1849
- Elachista luticomella Zeller, 1839
- Elachista maculicerusella (Bruand, 1859)
- Elachista martinii O. Hofmann, 1898
- Elachista nobilella Zeller, 1839
- Elachista occidentalis Frey, 1882
- Elachista orstadii N. Palm, 1943
- Elachista pigerella (Herrich-Schäffer, 1854)
- Elachista poae Stainton, 1855
- Elachista pomerana Frey, 1870
- Elachista quadripunctella (Hübner, 1825)
- Elachista rufocinerea (Haworth, 1828)
- Elachista scirpi Stainton, 1887
- Elachista serricornis Stainton, 1854
- Elachista subnigrella Douglas, 1853
- Elachista tengstromi Kaila, Bengtsson, Sulcs & Junnilainen, 2001
- Elachista tetragonella (Herrich-Schäffer, 1855)
- Elachista trapeziella Stainton, 1849
- Elachista utonella Frey, 1856
- Elachista wieseriella Huemer, 2000
- Elachista zernyi Hartig, 1941
- Elachista zonulae Sruoga, 1992
- Ethmia aurifluella (Hübner, 1810)
- Ethmia bipunctella (Fabricius, 1775)
- Ethmia candidella (Alphéraky, 1908)
- Ethmia chrysopygella (Kolenati, 1846)
- Ethmia dodecea (Haworth, 1828)
- Ethmia fumidella (Wocke, 1850)
- Ethmia haemorrhoidella (Eversmann, 1844)
- Ethmia lugubris (Staudinger, 1879)
- Ethmia pusiella (Linnaeus, 1758)
- Ethmia quadrillella (Goeze, 1783)
- Ethmia terminella T. B. Fletcher, 1938
- Exaeretia ciniflonella (Lienig & Zeller, 1846)
- Exaeretia culcitella (Herrich-Schäffer, 1854)
- Exaeretia preisseckeri (Rebel, 1937)
- Fuchsia luteella (Heinemann, 1870)
- Haplochrois albanica (Rebel & Zerny, 1932)
- Haplochrois ochraceella (Rebel, 1903)
- Heinemannia festivella (Denis & Schiffermüller, 1775)
- Heinemannia laspeyrella (Hübner, 1796)
- Hypercallia citrinalis (Scopoli, 1763)
- Levipalpus hepatariella (Lienig & Zeller, 1846)
- Luquetia lobella (Denis & Schiffermüller, 1775)
- Orophia denisella (Denis & Schiffermüller, 1775)
- Orophia ferrugella (Denis & Schiffermüller, 1775)
- Orophia mendosella (Zeller, 1868)
- Orophia sordidella (Hübner, 1796)
- Perittia farinella (Thunberg, 1794)
- Perittia herrichiella (Herrich-Schäffer, 1855)
- Semioscopis avellanella (Hübner, 1793)
- Semioscopis oculella (Thunberg, 1794)
- Semioscopis steinkellneriana (Denis & Schiffermüller, 1775)
- Semioscopis strigulana (Denis & Schiffermüller, 1775)
- Spuleria flavicaput (Haworth, 1828)
- Stephensia abbreviatella (Stainton, 1851)
- Stephensia brunnichella (Linnaeus, 1767)
- Telechrysis tripuncta (Haworth, 1828)

=== Endromidae ===
- Endromis versicolora (Linnaeus, 1758)

=== Epermeniidae ===
- Epermenia aequidentellus (E. Hofmann, 1867)
- Epermenia chaerophyllella (Goeze, 1783)
- Epermenia falciformis (Haworth, 1828)
- Epermenia illigerella (Hübner, 1813)
- Epermenia insecurella (Stainton, 1854)
- Epermenia petrusellus (Heylaerts, 1883)
- Epermenia strictellus (Wocke, 1867)
- Epermenia devotella (Heyden, 1863)
- Epermenia iniquellus (Wocke, 1867)
- Epermenia profugella (Stainton, 1856)
- Epermenia pontificella (Hübner, 1796)
- Epermenia scurella (Stainton, 1851)
- Ochromolopis ictella (Hübner, 1813)
- Phaulernis dentella (Zeller, 1839)
- Phaulernis fulviguttella (Zeller, 1839)
- Phaulernis rebeliella Gaedike, 1966
- Phaulernis statariella (Heyden, 1863)

=== Erebidae ===
- Amata kruegeri (Ragusa, 1904)
- Amata phegea (Linnaeus, 1758)
- Arctia caja (Linnaeus, 1758)
- Arctia festiva (Hufnagel, 1766)
- Arctia flavia (Fuessly, 1779)
- Arctia villica (Linnaeus, 1758)
- Arctornis l-nigrum (Muller, 1764)
- Atolmis rubricollis (Linnaeus, 1758)
- Autophila dilucida (Hübner, 1808)
- Autophila hirsuta (Staudinger, 1870)
- Autophila ligaminosa (Eversmann, 1851)
- Callimorpha dominula (Linnaeus, 1758)
- Calliteara abietis (Denis & Schiffermüller, 1775)
- Calliteara pudibunda (Linnaeus, 1758)
- Calymma communimacula (Denis & Schiffermüller, 1775)
- Calyptra thalictri (Borkhausen, 1790)
- Catephia alchymista (Denis & Schiffermüller, 1775)
- Catocala coniuncta (Esper, 1787)
- Catocala conversa (Esper, 1783)
- Catocala dilecta (Hübner, 1808)
- Catocala diversa (Geyer, 1828)
- Catocala electa (Vieweg, 1790)
- Catocala elocata (Esper, 1787)
- Catocala fraxini (Linnaeus, 1758)
- Catocala fulminea (Scopoli, 1763)
- Catocala hymenaea (Denis & Schiffermüller, 1775)
- Catocala nupta (Linnaeus, 1767)
- Catocala nymphaea (Esper, 1787)
- Catocala nymphagoga (Esper, 1787)
- Catocala promissa (Denis & Schiffermüller, 1775)
- Catocala puerpera (Giorna, 1791)
- Catocala sponsa (Linnaeus, 1767)
- Chelis maculosa (Gerning, 1780)
- Clytie syriaca (Bugnion, 1837)
- Colobochyla salicalis (Denis & Schiffermüller, 1775)
- Coscinia cribraria (Linnaeus, 1758)
- Coscinia striata (Linnaeus, 1758)
- Cybosia mesomella (Linnaeus, 1758)
- Diacrisia sannio (Linnaeus, 1758)
- Diaphora luctuosa (Hübner, 1831)
- Diaphora mendica (Clerck, 1759)
- Diaphora sordida (Hübner, 1803)
- Dicallomera fascelina (Linnaeus, 1758)
- Dysauxes ancilla (Linnaeus, 1767)
- Dysauxes punctata (Fabricius, 1781)
- Dysgonia algira (Linnaeus, 1767)
- Eilema caniola (Hübner, 1808)
- Eilema complana (Linnaeus, 1758)
- Eilema depressa (Esper, 1787)
- Eilema griseola (Hübner, 1803)
- Eilema lurideola (Zincken, 1817)
- Eilema lutarella (Linnaeus, 1758)
- Eilema palliatella (Scopoli, 1763)
- Eilema pseudocomplana (Daniel, 1939)
- Eilema pygmaeola (Doubleday, 1847)
- Eilema sororcula (Hufnagel, 1766)
- Eublemma amoena (Hübner, 1803)
- Eublemma minutata (Fabricius, 1794)
- Eublemma ostrina (Hübner, 1808)
- Eublemma parva (Hübner, 1808)
- Eublemma polygramma (Duponchel, 1842)
- Eublemma purpurina (Denis & Schiffermüller, 1775)
- Eublemma rosea (Hübner, 1790)
- Euclidia mi (Clerck, 1759)
- Euclidia glyphica (Linnaeus, 1758)
- Euclidia triquetra (Denis & Schiffermüller, 1775)
- Euplagia quadripunctaria (Poda, 1761)
- Euproctis chrysorrhoea (Linnaeus, 1758)
- Euproctis similis (Fuessly, 1775)
- Grammia quenseli (Paykull, 1791)
- Grammodes bifasciata (Petagna, 1787)
- Grammodes stolida (Fabricius, 1775)
- Gynaephora selenitica (Esper, 1789)
- Herminia grisealis (Denis & Schiffermüller, 1775)
- Herminia tarsicrinalis (Knoch, 1782)
- Herminia tarsipennalis (Treitschke, 1835)
- Herminia tenuialis (Rebel, 1899)
- Holoarctia cervini (Fallou, 1864)
- Hypena crassalis (Fabricius, 1787)
- Hypena obesalis Treitschke, 1829
- Hypena obsitalis (Hübner, 1813)
- Hypena proboscidalis (Linnaeus, 1758)
- Hypena rostralis (Linnaeus, 1758)
- Hypenodes humidalis Doubleday, 1850
- Hyphantria cunea (Drury, 1773)
- Hyphoraia aulica (Linnaeus, 1758)
- Hyphoraia testudinaria (Geoffroy in Fourcroy, 1785)
- Idia calvaria (Denis & Schiffermüller, 1775)
- Laelia coenosa (Hübner, 1808)
- Laspeyria flexula (Denis & Schiffermüller, 1775)
- Leucoma salicis (Linnaeus, 1758)
- Lithosia quadra (Linnaeus, 1758)
- Lygephila craccae (Denis & Schiffermüller, 1775)
- Lygephila ludicra (Hübner, 1790)
- Lygephila lusoria (Linnaeus, 1758)
- Lygephila pastinum (Treitschke, 1826)
- Lygephila viciae (Hübner, 1822)
- Lymantria dispar (Linnaeus, 1758)
- Lymantria monacha (Linnaeus, 1758)
- Macrochilo cribrumalis (Hübner, 1793)
- Metachrostis dardouini (Boisduval, 1840)
- Miltochrista miniata (Forster, 1771)
- Minucia lunaris (Denis & Schiffermüller, 1775)
- Nudaria mundana (Linnaeus, 1761)
- Ocneria rubea (Denis & Schiffermüller, 1775)
- Odice arcuinna (Hübner, 1790)
- Ophiusa tirhaca (Cramer, 1773)
- Orectis proboscidata (Herrich-Schäffer, 1851)
- Orgyia antiquoides (Hübner, 1822)
- Orgyia recens (Hübner, 1819)
- Orgyia antiqua (Linnaeus, 1758)
- Paidia rica (Freyer, 1858)
- Paracolax tristalis (Fabricius, 1794)
- Parascotia fuliginaria (Linnaeus, 1761)
- Parasemia plantaginis (Linnaeus, 1758)
- Parocneria detrita (Esper, 1785)
- Pechipogo plumigeralis Hübner, 1825
- Pechipogo strigilata (Linnaeus, 1758)
- Pelosia muscerda (Hufnagel, 1766)
- Pelosia obtusa (Herrich-Schäffer, 1852)
- Penthophera morio (Linnaeus, 1767)
- Pericallia matronula (Linnaeus, 1758)
- Phragmatobia fuliginosa (Linnaeus, 1758)
- Phragmatobia luctifera (Denis & Schiffermüller, 1775)
- Phytometra viridaria (Clerck, 1759)
- Polypogon tentacularia (Linnaeus, 1758)
- Rhyparia purpurata (Linnaeus, 1758)
- Rivula sericealis (Scopoli, 1763)
- Schrankia costaestrigalis (Stephens, 1834)
- Schrankia taenialis (Hübner, 1809)
- Scoliopteryx libatrix (Linnaeus, 1758)
- Setema cereola (Hübner, 1803)
- Setina aurita (Esper, 1787)
- Setina irrorella (Linnaeus, 1758)
- Setina roscida (Denis & Schiffermüller, 1775)
- Simplicia rectalis (Eversmann, 1842)
- Spilosoma lubricipeda (Linnaeus, 1758)
- Spilosoma lutea (Hufnagel, 1766)
- Spilosoma urticae (Esper, 1789)
- Thumatha senex (Hübner, 1808)
- Trisateles emortualis (Denis & Schiffermüller, 1775)
- Tyria jacobaeae (Linnaeus, 1758)
- Utetheisa pulchella (Linnaeus, 1758)
- Watsonarctia deserta (Bartel, 1902)
- Zanclognatha lunalis (Scopoli, 1763)
- Zanclognatha zelleralis (Wocke, 1850)

=== Eriocraniidae ===
- Dyseriocrania subpurpurella (Haworth, 1828)
- Eriocrania alpinella Burmann, 1958
- Eriocrania cicatricella (Zetterstedt, 1839)
- Eriocrania sangii (Wood, 1891)
- Eriocrania semipurpurella (Stephens, 1835)
- Eriocrania sparrmannella (Bosc, 1791)
- Heringocrania unimaculella (Zetterstedt, 1839)
- Paracrania chrysolepidella (Zeller, 1851)
