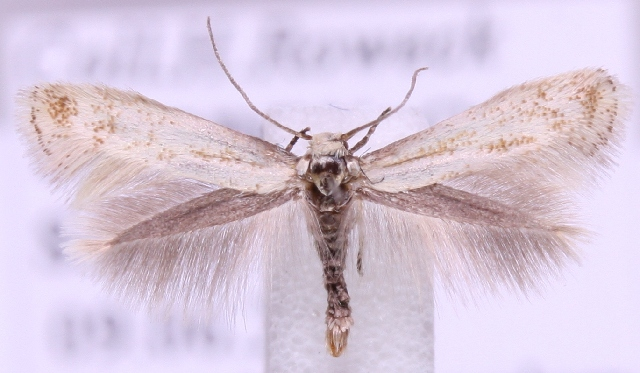

Scientific classification
- Kingdom: Animalia
- Phylum: Arthropoda
- Clade: Pancrustacea
- Class: Insecta
- Order: Lepidoptera
- Family: Elachistidae
- Genus: Elachista
- Species: E. anserinella

Binomial name
- Elachista anserinella Zeller, 1839

= Elachista anserinella =

Species of moth

Elachista anserinella is a moth of the family Elachistidae. It is found in regions extending from Scandinavia and the Baltic region to the Pyrenees, Italy and Greece and from France to Russia.

The wingspan is 10–11 millimetres (0.39–0.43 in). Adults are on the wing from May to June.

The larvae feed on Brachypodium pinnatum. They mine the leaves of their host plant. Larvae can be found in late spring.
