= Elachista klimeschiella =

Scientific classification
- Domain: Eukaryota
- Kingdom: Animalia
- Phylum: Arthropoda
- Class: Insecta
- Order: Lepidoptera
- Family: Elachistidae
- Genus: Elachista
- Species: E. klimeschiella

Binomial name
- Elachista klimeschiella Parenti, 2002

Synonyms
- Elachista klimeschi Parenti, 1981

Species of moth

Elachista klimeschiella is a moth of the family Elachistidae. It is found in France, Switzerland, Austria, Italy, the Czech Republic and Hungary.
