= Bucculatrix clavenae =

Scientific classification
- Kingdom: Animalia
- Phylum: Arthropoda
- Clade: Pancrustacea
- Class: Insecta
- Order: Lepidoptera
- Family: Bucculatricidae
- Genus: Bucculatrix
- Species: B. clavenae

Binomial name
- Bucculatrix clavenae Klimesch, 1950

Species of moth

Bucculatrix clavenae is a moth in the family Bucculatricidae. It was described by Josef Wilhelm Klimesch in 1950. It is found in the Alps.

There is probably one generation per year.
