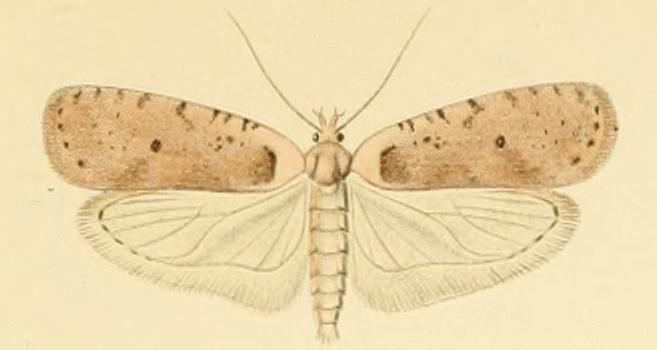

Scientific classification
- Kingdom: Animalia
- Phylum: Arthropoda
- Clade: Pancrustacea
- Class: Insecta
- Order: Lepidoptera
- Family: Depressariidae
- Genus: Agonopterix
- Species: A. cervariella

Binomial name
- Agonopterix cervariella (Constant, 1884)

Synonyms
- Depressaria cervariella Constant, 1884

= Agonopterix cervariella =

Species of moth

Agonopterix cervariella is a moth of the family Depressariidae. It is found in France, Switzerland, Austria, Italy and North Macedonia.

The wingspan is 23–25 mm.

The larvae feed on Peucedanum cervaria.
