= Coleophora paradrymidis =

Scientific classification
- Kingdom: Animalia
- Phylum: Arthropoda
- Class: Insecta
- Order: Lepidoptera
- Family: Coleophoridae
- Genus: Coleophora
- Species: C. paradrymidis

Binomial name
- Coleophora paradrymidis Toll, 1949

Species of moth

Coleophora paradrymidis is a moth of the family Coleophoridae. It is found in Sweden, Ukraine, the Czech Republic and Austria.

The larvae possibly feed on the leaves of Thesium alpinum.
