= Coleophora thymi =

Scientific classification
- Kingdom: Animalia
- Phylum: Arthropoda
- Class: Insecta
- Order: Lepidoptera
- Family: Coleophoridae
- Genus: Coleophora
- Species: C. thymi

Binomial name
- Coleophora thymi Hering, 1942

Species of moth

Coleophora thymi is a moth of the family Coleophoridae. It is found from Germany to Italy and Greece.

The larvae feed on Thymus species. Larvae can be found from autumn to June.
