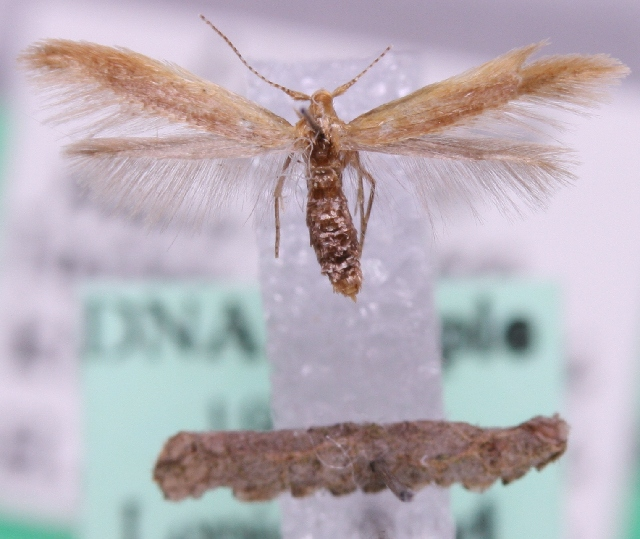

Scientific classification
- Kingdom: Animalia
- Phylum: Arthropoda
- Clade: Pancrustacea
- Class: Insecta
- Order: Lepidoptera
- Family: Coleophoridae
- Genus: Coleophora
- Species: C. adjectella

Binomial name
- Coleophora adjectella Herrich-Schäffer, 1861

Synonyms
- Coleophora badiipennella adjectella

= Coleophora adjectella =

Species of moth

Coleophora adjectella is a moth of the family Coleophoridae. It is found from Scandinavia to Spain, Sardinia, Sicily and Greece and from Great Britain to Poland and Slovakia.

The wingspan is 9–10 mm.

The larvae feed on Crataegus species, Prunus domestica and Prunus spinosa.
