= Coleophora motacillella =

Scientific classification
- Kingdom: Animalia
- Phylum: Arthropoda
- Clade: Pancrustacea
- Class: Insecta
- Order: Lepidoptera
- Family: Coleophoridae
- Genus: Coleophora
- Species: C. motacillella

Binomial name
- Coleophora motacillella Zeller, 1849

Synonyms
- Ecebalia motacillella; Coleophora palumbipennella Toll, 1952

Species of moth

Coleophora motacillella is a moth of the family Coleophoridae. It is found from France to southern Russia and from Denmark to Austria and Romania.

Adults are on wing in July and August.

The larvae feed on Chenopodium and Atriplex species. They feed on the generative organs of their host plant.
