= Coleophora autumnella =

Scientific classification
- Kingdom: Animalia
- Phylum: Arthropoda
- Class: Insecta
- Order: Lepidoptera
- Family: Coleophoridae
- Genus: Coleophora
- Species: C. autumnella

Binomial name
- Coleophora autumnella (Duponchel, 1843)

Synonyms
- Ornix autumnella Duponchel, 1843; Coleophora asterifoliella Klimesch, 1939

Species of moth

Coleophora autumnella is a moth of the family Coleophoridae that can be found in Czech Republic, Slovakia, Austria, Romania and Spain.

The larvae feed on Aster alpinus and Aster amellus. Full-grown larvae can be found in May.
