= Coleophora dentiferella =

Scientific classification
- Kingdom: Animalia
- Phylum: Arthropoda
- Class: Insecta
- Order: Lepidoptera
- Family: Coleophoridae
- Genus: Coleophora
- Species: C. dentiferella

Binomial name
- Coleophora dentiferella Toll, 1952

Synonyms
- Coleophora latilineella Toll, 1961

Species of moth

Coleophora dentiferella is a moth of the family Coleophoridae. It is found in Italy, France, Austria, the Czech Republic, Slovakia, Hungary, North Macedonia and Greece.

The larvae feed on the leaves of Minuartia mutabilis.
