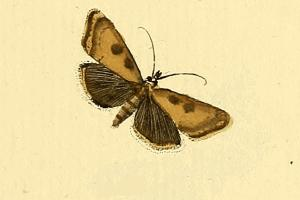

Scientific classification
- Kingdom: Animalia
- Phylum: Arthropoda
- Clade: Pancrustacea
- Class: Insecta
- Order: Lepidoptera
- Family: Crambidae
- Genus: Udea
- Species: U. nebulalis

Binomial name
- Udea nebulalis (Hubner, 1796)

Synonyms
- Pyralis nebulalis Hübner, 1796; Botys pratalis Zeller, 1841; Pyralis squalidalis Hübner, 1809

= Udea nebulalis =

Species of moth

Udea nebulalis is a species of moth in the family Crambidae. It is found in France, Switzerland, Austria, Italy, Germany, Poland, the Czech Republic, Slovakia, Slovenia, Croatia, Bosnia and Herzegovina, Serbia and Montenegro, Bulgaria, Romania, Estonia and Fennoscandia.

The wingspan is 18–25 mm.

The larvae feed on Campanula species.
