= Agonopterix hippomarathri =

Scientific classification
- Kingdom: Animalia
- Phylum: Arthropoda
- Clade: Pancrustacea
- Class: Insecta
- Order: Lepidoptera
- Family: Depressariidae
- Genus: Agonopterix
- Species: A. hippomarathri

Binomial name
- Agonopterix hippomarathri (Nickerl, 1864)

Synonyms
- Depressaria hippomarathri Nickerl, 1864; Depressaria hypomarathri

Species of moth

Agonopterix hippomarathri is a moth of the family Depressariidae. It is found in France, Italy, Switzerland, Austria, the Czech Republic, Slovakia, Hungary and Ukraine and on Sardinia and Corsica. It has also been recorded from Morocco.

The wingspan is 14–18 mm.

The larvae feed on Seseli hippomarathrum and Trinia glauca.
