= Coleophora tolli =

Scientific classification
- Kingdom: Animalia
- Phylum: Arthropoda
- Clade: Pancrustacea
- Class: Insecta
- Order: Lepidoptera
- Family: Coleophoridae
- Genus: Coleophora
- Species: C. tolli

Binomial name
- Coleophora tolli Klimesch, 1951

Species of moth

Coleophora tolli is a moth of the family Coleophoridae. It is found from Germany to the Pyrenees and Italy and from France to Slovakia.

Larvae can be found from autumn to June.
