= Elachista baldizzonei =

Scientific classification
- Kingdom: Animalia
- Phylum: Arthropoda
- Class: Insecta
- Order: Lepidoptera
- Family: Elachistidae
- Genus: Elachista
- Species: E. baldizzonei

Binomial name
- Elachista baldizzonei Traugott-Olsen, 1996

Species of moth

Elachista baldizzonei is a moth of the family Elachistidae that is found in Italy and Austria.
