= Coleophora sergiella =

Scientific classification
- Kingdom: Animalia
- Phylum: Arthropoda
- Class: Insecta
- Order: Lepidoptera
- Family: Coleophoridae
- Genus: Coleophora
- Species: C. sergiella

Binomial name
- Coleophora sergiella Falkovitsh, 1979

Species of moth

Coleophora sergiella is a moth of the family Coleophoridae. It is found in France, Spain, the Czech Republic, Austria, Slovakia and Hungary, but also in Mongolia.

The larvae feed on the leaves of Potentilla cinerea var. velutina and possibly Artemisia frigida.
