= Coleophora chrysanthemi =

Scientific classification
- Kingdom: Animalia
- Phylum: Arthropoda
- Class: Insecta
- Order: Lepidoptera
- Family: Coleophoridae
- Genus: Coleophora
- Species: C. chrysanthemi

Binomial name
- Coleophora chrysanthemi Hofmann, 1869

Species of moth

Coleophora chrysanthemi is a moth of the family Coleophoridae. It is found from Finland to Italy and Hungary.

The adults are small brown moths with fringed wings and long antennae.

The larvae feed on a species of tansy, Tanacetum corymbosum. They create a tubular silken case with dark length ridges. Larvae can be found in the spring, up to April.
