= Elachista zonulae =

Scientific classification
- Kingdom: Animalia
- Phylum: Arthropoda
- Clade: Pancrustacea
- Class: Insecta
- Order: Lepidoptera
- Family: Elachistidae
- Genus: Elachista
- Species: E. zonulae

Binomial name
- Elachista zonulae (Sruoga, 1992)

Synonyms
- Biselachista zonulae Sruoga, 1992

Species of moth

Elachista zonulae is a moth of the family Elachistidae. It is found in the Alps, the Tatra Mountains in Poland, the Tian Shan Mountains in Kazakhstan, Kyrgyzstan and Tajikistan, and the Altai Mountains in Siberia.

The forewing length is 2.5–3.5 mm (0.098–0.138 in) in males and 2.4–2.8 mm (0.094–0.110 in) in females. There is one generation per year. The larvae feed on Carex sempervirens. They mine the leaves of their host plant. Full-grown larvae are 4.5–5.5 millimetres (0.18–0.22 in) long.
