= Coleophora frankii =

Scientific classification
- Kingdom: Animalia
- Phylum: Arthropoda
- Class: Insecta
- Order: Lepidoptera
- Family: Coleophoridae
- Genus: Coleophora
- Species: C. frankii

Binomial name
- Coleophora frankii Schmidt, 1886

Species of moth

Coleophora frankii is a moth of the family Coleophoridae. It is found from Germany to Italy, Croatia and Hungary. Larvae can be found from June to September.
