= Coleophora squamosella =

Scientific classification
- Kingdom: Animalia
- Phylum: Arthropoda
- Class: Insecta
- Order: Lepidoptera
- Family: Coleophoridae
- Genus: Coleophora
- Species: C. squamosella

Binomial name
- Coleophora squamosella Stainton, 1856

Synonyms
- Coleophora erigerella Ford, 1935; Coleophora sabulicola Benander, 1939

Species of moth

Coleophora squamosella is a moth of the family Coleophoridae. It is found in Europe (from Great Britain to Poland and Hungary and from Fennoscandia to France, Italy and Austria), the Baltic states, the Caucasus, Russia (Baikal and Altai) and Turkey.

The wingspan is 11–13 mm. Adults are on wing in June and July.

The larvae feed in a case on Erigeron species, including Erigeron acer.
