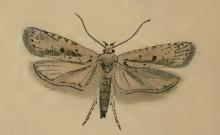

Scientific classification
- Kingdom: Animalia
- Phylum: Arthropoda
- Clade: Pancrustacea
- Class: Insecta
- Order: Lepidoptera
- Family: Depressariidae
- Genus: Agonopterix
- Species: A. silerella

Binomial name
- Agonopterix silerella (Stainton, 1865)

Synonyms
- Depressaria silerella Stainton, 1865

= Agonopterix silerella =

Species of moth

Agonopterix silerella is a moth of the family Depressariidae. It is found in Italy, Switzerland and Austria.

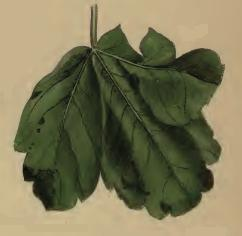
A leaf of Siler aquilegifolium attacked by larva

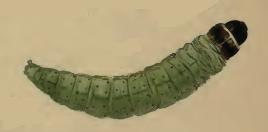
Larva

The wingspan is 9–11 mm.

The larvae have been recorded feeding on Laserpitium siler and Laser trilobum.
