= Coleophora halophilella =

Scientific classification
- Kingdom: Animalia
- Phylum: Arthropoda
- Class: Insecta
- Order: Lepidoptera
- Family: Coleophoridae
- Genus: Coleophora
- Species: C. halophilella

Binomial name
- Coleophora halophilella Zimmermann, 1926

Species of moth

Coleophora halophilella is a moth of the family Coleophoridae. It is found in France, Italy, Austria, the Czech Republic, Slovakia, Hungary, Croatia, Romania, Poland, Ukraine, Greece, Crete and southern Russia.

The wingspan is about 14 mm.

== Etymology ==
The species names refers to the halophilic traits of the species.
