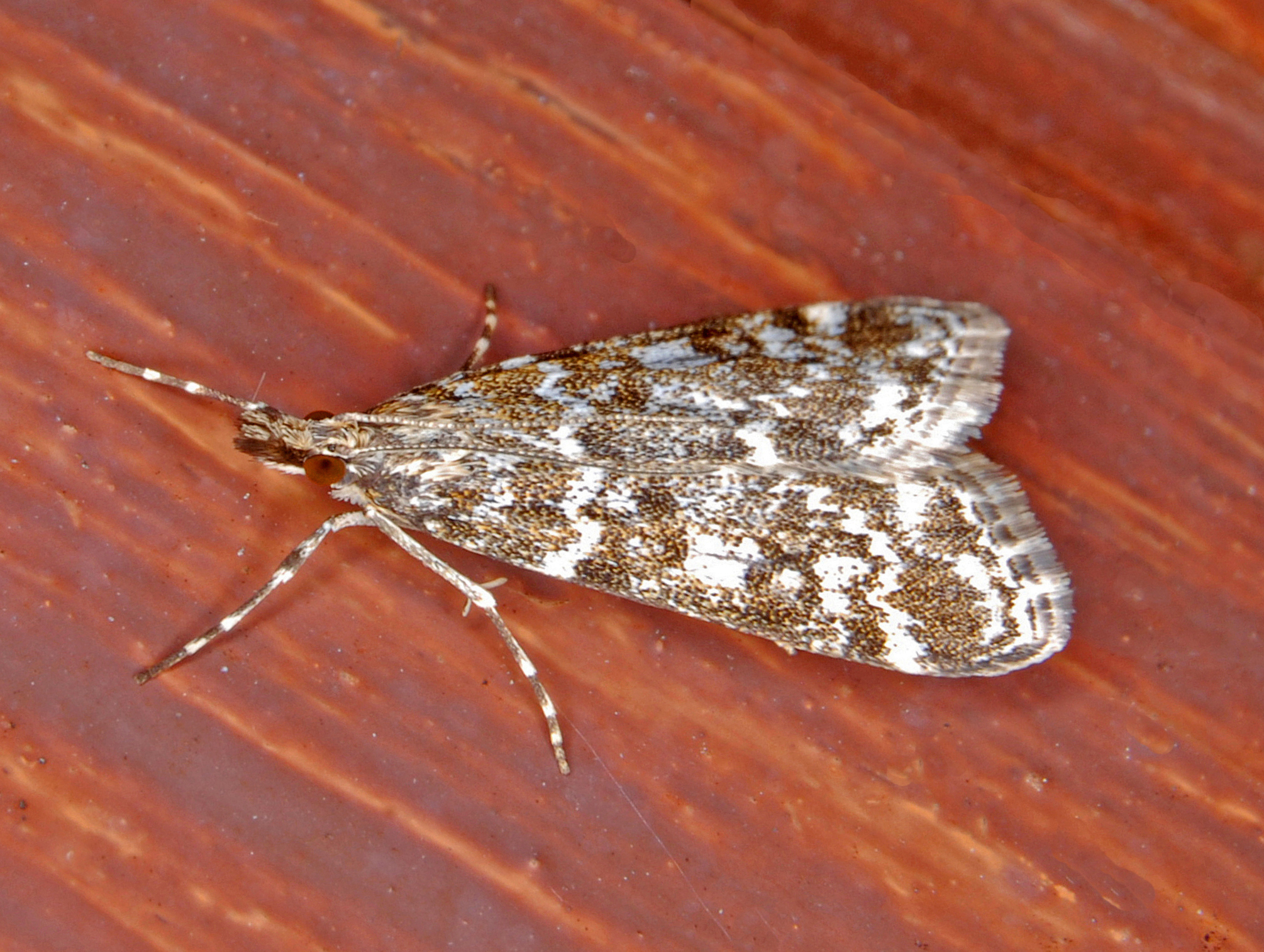

Scientific classification
- Kingdom: Animalia
- Phylum: Arthropoda
- Clade: Pancrustacea
- Class: Insecta
- Order: Lepidoptera
- Family: Crambidae
- Genus: Eudonia
- Species: E. sudetica

Binomial name
- Eudonia sudetica (Zeller, 1839)

Synonyms
- Eudorea sudetica Zeller, 1839; Eudorea sudetica var. livonica Zeller, 1846; Scoparia petrophila balcanica Rebel, 1917; Scoparia sudeticalis ab. luzialis Guenée, 1854

= Eudonia sudetica =

Species of moth

Eudonia sudetica is a species of moth in the family Crambidae described by Philipp Christoph Zeller in 1839.

== Etymology ==
The species name sudetica means from Sudetes.

== Distribution ==
This species can be found in most of Europe, except Ireland, Great Britain, the Benelux, Portugal and most of the Balkan Peninsula.

== Description ==
Eudonia sudetica has a wingspan of 17–21 mm. The forewings are whitish with brown markings.

== Biology ==
The larvae live from October to May feeding on moss on rocks or trees.

== Bibliography ==
- Zeller, P. C. (1839): Versuch einer naturgemäßen Eintheilung der Schaben. — Isis von Oken 1839 (3): 167-220. Leipzig
