= Coleophora pseudociconiella =

Scientific classification
- Kingdom: Animalia
- Phylum: Arthropoda
- Class: Insecta
- Order: Lepidoptera
- Family: Coleophoridae
- Genus: Coleophora
- Species: C. pseudociconiella

Binomial name
- Coleophora pseudociconiella Toll, 1952

Synonyms
- Casignetella pseudociconiella; Hamuliella patrascui Nemes, 2003

Species of moth

Coleophora pseudociconiella is a moth of the family Coleophoridae. It is found in Sardinia, Italy, Croatia, Austria, the Czech Republic, Slovakia, Hungary, Romania, Bulgaria, Ukraine, Russia and Asia Minor.

Adults are on wing in August.
