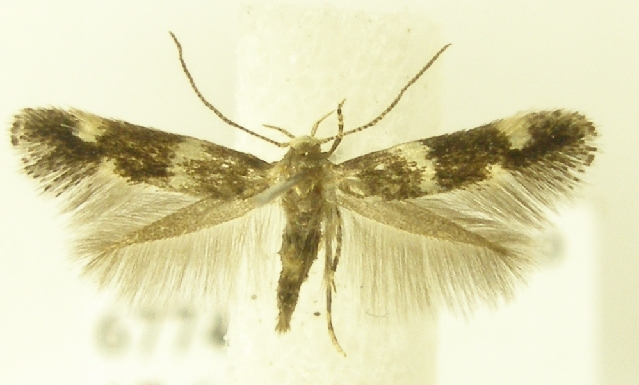

Scientific classification
- Kingdom: Animalia
- Phylum: Arthropoda
- Class: Insecta
- Order: Lepidoptera
- Family: Elachistidae
- Genus: Elachista
- Species: E. compsa

Binomial name
- Elachista compsa Traugott-Olsen, 1974

= Elachista compsa =

Species of moth

Elachista compsa is a moth of the family Elachistidae. It is found from Fennoscandia and the Baltic region to Germany, Poland to Italy.

The wingspan is 8–11 millimetres (0.31–0.43 in).

The larvae feed on Deschampsia cespitosa and Melica nutans uniflora. They mine the leaves of their host plant. Larvae can be found from October to December. They then overwinter within the mine. In spring, they vacate the mine to pupate. There is a second generation in July. They have a light brown head.
