= Udea murinalis =

Scientific classification
- Kingdom: Animalia
- Phylum: Arthropoda
- Class: Insecta
- Order: Lepidoptera
- Family: Crambidae
- Genus: Udea
- Species: U. murinalis

Binomial name
- Udea murinalis (Fischer v. Röslerstamm, 1842)

Synonyms
- Scopula murinalis Fischer von Röslerstamm, 1842

Species of moth

Udea murinalis is a species of moth in the family Crambidae. It is found in France, Switzerland, Austria and Italy.
