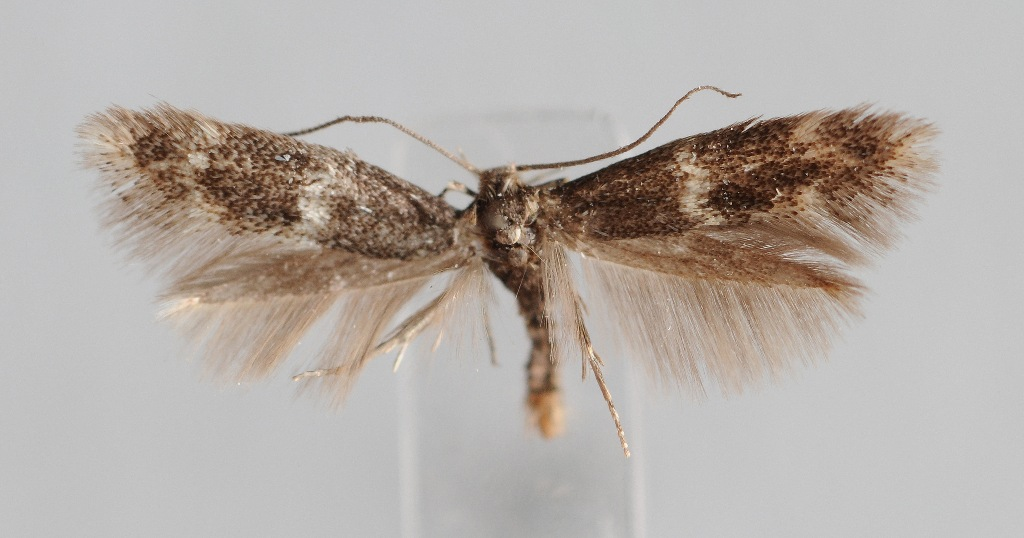

Scientific classification
- Kingdom: Animalia
- Phylum: Arthropoda
- Class: Insecta
- Order: Lepidoptera
- Family: Elachistidae
- Genus: Elachista
- Species: E. excelsicola

Binomial name
- Elachista excelsicola Braun, 1948

Synonyms
- Elachista parasella Traugott-Olsen, 1974

= Elachista excelsicola =

Species of moth

Elachista excelsicola is a moth of the family Elachistidae. It is found in Austria, Poland, Fennoscandia and northern Russia. It is also found in North America.

The wingspan is 8–12 millimetres (0.31–0.47 in). The scales of the forewings are dirty creamy white at the base, unevenly tipped with grey, giving the wing a pale grey appearance. The hindwings are pale grey.
