= Bucculatrix atagina =

Scientific classification
- Kingdom: Animalia
- Phylum: Arthropoda
- Clade: Pancrustacea
- Class: Insecta
- Order: Lepidoptera
- Family: Bucculatricidae
- Genus: Bucculatrix
- Species: B. atagina

Binomial name
- Bucculatrix atagina Wocke, 1876

Species of moth

Bucculatrix atagina is a moth in the family Bucculatricidae. It was described by Maximilian Ferdinand Wocke in 1876. It is found in the Alps.

The larvae feed on Artemisia campestris. They mine the leaves of their host plant.
