= Coleophora vacciniella =

Scientific classification
- Kingdom: Animalia
- Phylum: Arthropoda
- Class: Insecta
- Order: Lepidoptera
- Family: Coleophoridae
- Genus: Coleophora
- Species: C. vacciniella

Binomial name
- Coleophora vacciniella Herrich-Schaffer, 1861

Synonyms
- Coleophora rhododendri Hofmnann, 1869; Coleophora betulaenanae Klimesch, 1958

Species of moth

Coleophora vacciniella is a moth of the family Coleophoridae. It is found from Fennoscandia and northern Russia to the Pyrenees and Italy and from France to Romania.

The larvae feed on Vaccinium myrtillus, Vaccinium uliginosum and Vaccinium vitis-idaea. Larvae can be found from July to autumn.
