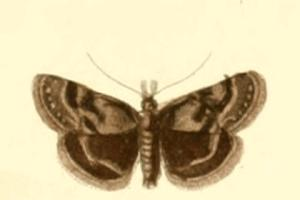

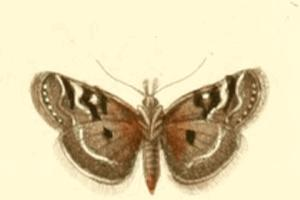

Scientific classification
- Kingdom: Animalia
- Phylum: Arthropoda
- Clade: Pancrustacea
- Class: Insecta
- Order: Lepidoptera
- Family: Crambidae
- Subfamily: Glaphyriinae; Minet, 1982
- Genus: Catharia; Lederer, 1863
- Species: C. pyrenaealis

Binomial name
- Catharia pyrenaealis (Duponchel, 1843)

Synonyms
- Hercyna pyrenaealis Duponchel, 1843; Hercyna simplonialis Heydenreich, 1851; Catharia simplonialis; Hercyna simplonialis Herrich-Schäffer, 1848

= Catharia =

Genus of moths

Catharia is a monotypic genus of moths described by Julius Lederer in 1863. It contains the single species Catharia pyrenaealis described by Philogène Auguste Joseph Duponchel in 1843. It is found in Central Europe.

The genus, which was formerly placed in the disputed monotypic subfamily Cathariinae, is now placed in the subfamily Glaphyriinae according to a pylogenetic analysis based on gene data. Different authors treat Catharia simplonialis as either a valid species or a subspecies of Catharia pyrenaealis.

The larvae of C. pyrenaealis are recorded to feed on the Caryophyllaceae Heliosperma alpestre.
