= Elachista brachypterella =

Scientific classification
- Domain: Eukaryota
- Kingdom: Animalia
- Phylum: Arthropoda
- Class: Insecta
- Order: Lepidoptera
- Family: Elachistidae
- Genus: Elachista
- Species: E. brachypterella

Binomial name
- Elachista brachypterella (Klimesch, 1990)

Synonyms
- Biselachista brachypterella Klimesch, 1990

Species of moth

Elachista brachypterella is a moth of the family Elachistidae that is found in Italy and Austria.
