= Coleophora pseudoditella =

Scientific classification
- Kingdom: Animalia
- Phylum: Arthropoda
- Clade: Pancrustacea
- Class: Insecta
- Order: Lepidoptera
- Family: Coleophoridae
- Genus: Coleophora
- Species: C. pseudoditella

Binomial name
- Coleophora pseudoditella Baldizzone & Patzak, 1983

Species of moth

Coleophora pseudoditella is a moth of the family Coleophoridae. It is found in France, Germany, Italy, Austria, the Czech Republic, Slovakia, Hungary, Ukraine and southern Russia.

The larvae feed on the leaves of Crinitaria linosyris and Galatella punctata.
