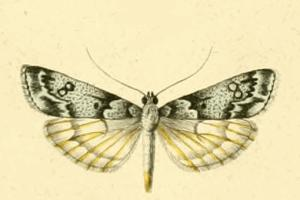

Scientific classification
- Kingdom: Animalia
- Phylum: Arthropoda
- Class: Insecta
- Order: Lepidoptera
- Family: Crambidae
- Genus: Eudonia
- Species: E. vallesialis

Binomial name
- Eudonia vallesialis (Duponchel, 1832)

Synonyms
- Eudorea vallesialis Duponchel, 1832; Eudorea imparella La Harpe, 1863; Scoparia imparella Wocke, 1864; Eudorea octonella Zeller, 1839; Eudorea parella Zeller, 1839; Eudorea valesialis var. valesiacella Zeller, 1846; Scoparia valesialis ab. stauderi Mitterberger, 1917

= Eudonia vallesialis =

Species of moth

Eudonia vallesialis is a species of moth in the family Crambidae. It is found in France, Switzerland, Austria, Italy, Germany, Poland, Slovakia, Hungary, Croatia and Romania.
