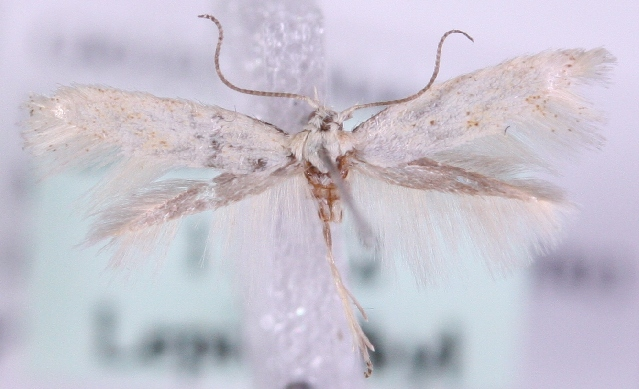

Scientific classification
- Domain: Eukaryota
- Kingdom: Animalia
- Phylum: Arthropoda
- Class: Insecta
- Order: Lepidoptera
- Family: Elachistidae
- Genus: Elachista
- Species: E. rudectella

Binomial name
- Elachista rudectella Stainton, 1851

= Elachista rudectella =

Species of moth

Elachista rudectella is a moth of the family Elachistidae. It is found from Germany to Italy, Greece and Romania. It is also found in Russia.

The larvae feed on Phleum phleoides. They mine the leaves of their host plant.
