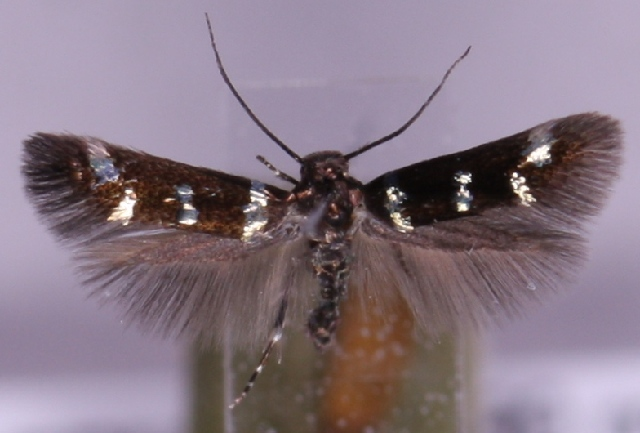

Scientific classification
- Kingdom: Animalia
- Phylum: Arthropoda
- Class: Insecta
- Order: Lepidoptera
- Family: Elachistidae
- Genus: Elachista
- Species: E. geminatella

Binomial name
- Elachista geminatella (Herrich-Schäffer, 1855)

Synonyms
- Poeciloptilia geminatella Herrich-Schaffer, 1855; Elachista nieukerkeni Traugott-Olsen, 1995

= Elachista geminatella =

Species of moth

Elachista geminatella is a moth of the family Elachistidae found in Europe.

== Description ==
The wingspan is 7.8–9.6 millimetres (0.31–0.38 in). Adults are on wing in July.

The larvae feed on field wood-rush (Luzula campestris) and common woodrush (Luzula multiflora), mining the leaves of their host plant.

== Distribution ==
It is found from Sweden to Spain and from Great Britain to the Baltic region and Austria.
