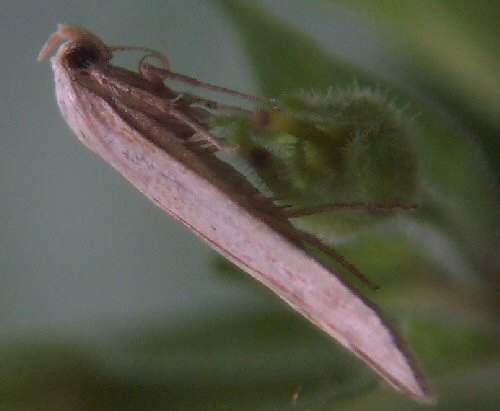

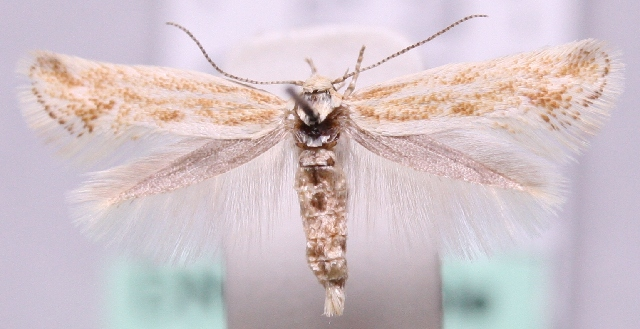

Scientific classification
- Domain: Eukaryota
- Kingdom: Animalia
- Phylum: Arthropoda
- Class: Insecta
- Order: Lepidoptera
- Family: Elachistidae
- Genus: Elachista
- Species: E. rufocinerea

Binomial name
- Elachista rufocinerea (Haworth, 1828)

Synonyms
- Porrectaria rufocinerea Haworth, 1828

= Elachista rufocinerea =

Species of moth

Elachista rufocinerea is a moth of the family Elachistidae found in Europe.

The wingspan is 10–11 millimetres (0.39–0.43 in). The head is whitish. Forewings white, in male densely irrorated with brown, in female more. thinly with ochreous. Hindwings in male dark grey, in female grey.

The moth flies from April to May depending on the location.

The larvae feed on various grasses, primarily, false oat-grass (Arrhenatherum elatius), tall fescue (Festuca arundinacea) and creeping soft grass (Holcus mollis). Larvae can be found in early spring.
