= Ethmia chrysopygella =

Scientific classification
- Kingdom: Animalia
- Phylum: Arthropoda
- Clade: Pancrustacea
- Class: Insecta
- Order: Lepidoptera
- Family: Depressariidae
- Genus: Ethmia
- Species: E. chrysopygella

Binomial name
- Ethmia chrysopygella (Kolenati, 1846)

Synonyms
- Chalybe chrysopygella Kolenati, 1846; Psecadia flavitibiella Herrich-Schäffer, [1854]

Species of moth

Ethmia chrysopygella is a moth in the family Depressariidae. It is found in Azerbaijan, Russia, France, Switzerland, Austria, Italy and North Macedonia.

The larvae feed on Thalictrum species.
