= Coleophora altivagella =

Scientific classification
- Kingdom: Animalia
- Phylum: Arthropoda
- Class: Insecta
- Order: Lepidoptera
- Family: Coleophoridae
- Genus: Coleophora
- Species: C. altivagella

Binomial name
- Coleophora altivagella Toll, 1952

Species of moth

Coleophora altivagella is a moth of the family Coleophoridae. It is found in France, Italy and Austria.
