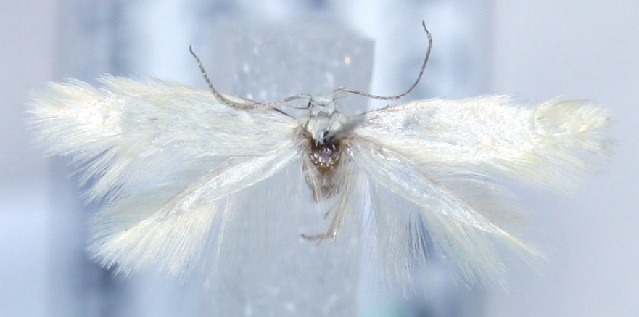

Scientific classification
- Domain: Eukaryota
- Kingdom: Animalia
- Phylum: Arthropoda
- Class: Insecta
- Order: Lepidoptera
- Family: Elachistidae
- Genus: Elachista
- Species: E. occulta

Binomial name
- Elachista occulta Parenti, 1978

= Elachista occulta =

Species of moth

Elachista occulta is a moth of the family Elachistidae. It is found from southern France to Greece.

The larvae feed on Festuca acuminata and Festuca cinerea. They mine the leaves of their host plant.
