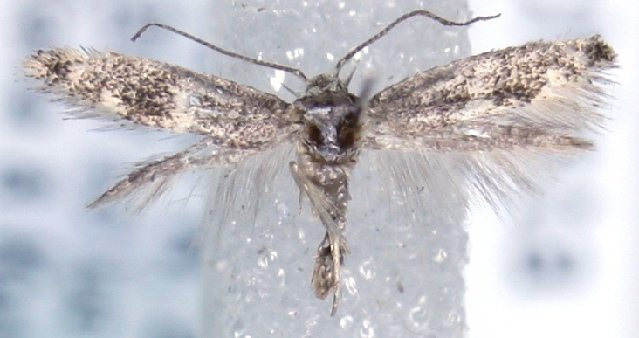

Scientific classification
- Kingdom: Animalia
- Phylum: Arthropoda
- Clade: Pancrustacea
- Class: Insecta
- Order: Lepidoptera
- Family: Elachistidae
- Genus: Elachista
- Species: E. atrisquamosa

Binomial name
- Elachista atrisquamosa Staudinger, 1880

Synonyms
- Elachista amseli Rebel, 1933

= Elachista atrisquamosa =

Species of moth

Elachista atrisquamosa is a moth of the family Elachistidae which can be found in Croatia, Italy, Austria, Greece and Turkey.
