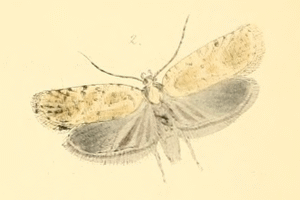

Scientific classification
- Kingdom: Animalia
- Phylum: Arthropoda
- Clade: Pancrustacea
- Class: Insecta
- Order: Lepidoptera
- Family: Depressariidae
- Genus: Agonopterix
- Species: A. nanatella

Binomial name
- Agonopterix nanatella (Stainton, 1849)

Synonyms
- Depressaria nanatella Stainton, 1849; Depressaria aridella Mann, 1869

= Agonopterix nanatella =

Species of moth

Agonopterix nanatella is a moth of the family Depressariidae. It is found in most of Europe, except Fennoscandia, Poland, Ukraine, the Baltic region and most of the Balkan Peninsula.

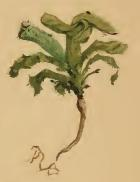
Plant of Carlina vulgaris with mined leaves

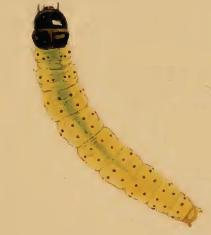
Larva

The wingspan is 15–19 mm. The forewings are pale whitish ochreous, brownish-tinged and strewn with brown strigulae, costa marked with spots of darker strigulae; first and sometimes second discal stigmata dark fuscous; sometimes a suffused fuscous spot between and above these. Hindwings grey, darker posteriorly. The larva is yellow-green; dots grey; dorsal line darker; head and plate of 2 black

Adults are on wing from July to August.

The larvae of ssp. nanatella feed on Carlina vulgaris.

Larvae can be found from April to May (aridella) or June (nanatella).

== Subspecies ==
- Agonopterix nanatella nanatella
- Agonopterix nanatella aridella Mann, 1869 (southern Europe)
