= Elachista manni =

Scientific classification
- Kingdom: Animalia
- Phylum: Arthropoda
- Class: Insecta
- Order: Lepidoptera
- Family: Elachistidae
- Genus: Elachista
- Species: E. manni

Binomial name
- Elachista manni Traugott-Olsen, 1990

Species of moth

Elachista manni is a moth of the family Elachistidae. It is found in Austria, the Czech Republic, Slovakia, Hungary and Russia.
