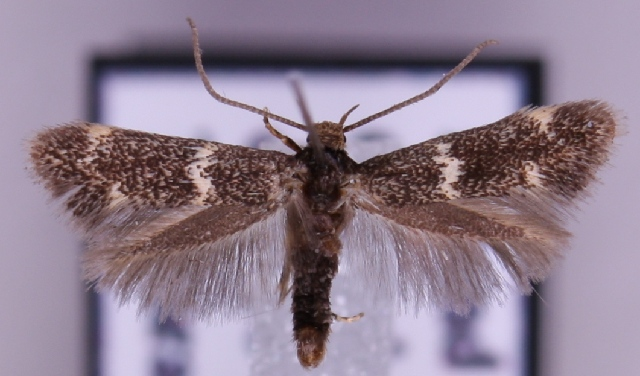

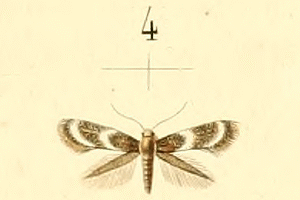

Scientific classification
- Domain: Eukaryota
- Kingdom: Animalia
- Phylum: Arthropoda
- Class: Insecta
- Order: Lepidoptera
- Family: Elachistidae
- Genus: Elachista
- Species: E. griseella

Binomial name
- Elachista griseella (Duponchel, 1843)

Synonyms
- Oecophora griseella Duponchel, 1843; Elachista dispositella Frey, 1859

= Elachista griseella =

Species of moth

Elachista griseella is a moth of the family Elachistidae. It is found from France to Italy and Ukraine.

The larvae feed on Calamagrostis epigejos, Dactylis glomerata, Elymus repens, Festuca rubra and Poa pratensis. They mine the leaves of their host plant. The species hibernates as an intermediate larva and resumes feeding in early April.
