= Coleophora glaseri =

Scientific classification
- Kingdom: Animalia
- Phylum: Arthropoda
- Class: Insecta
- Order: Lepidoptera
- Family: Coleophoridae
- Genus: Coleophora
- Species: C. glaseri

Binomial name
- Coleophora glaseri Toll, 1961

Species of moth

Coleophora glaseri is a moth of the family Coleophoridae. It is found in the Czech Republic, Slovakia, Austria, Hungary and Bulgaria.

The larvae feed on Genista tinctoria. They create a dark brown, ribbed, tubular silken case of about 7 mm length. It has a mouth angle of about 50°.
