= Coleophora peisoniella =

Scientific classification
- Kingdom: Animalia
- Phylum: Arthropoda
- Class: Insecta
- Order: Lepidoptera
- Family: Coleophoridae
- Genus: Coleophora
- Species: C. peisoniella

Binomial name
- Coleophora peisoniella Kasy, 1965

Species of moth

Coleophora peisoniella is a moth of the family Coleophoridae. It is found in France, Austria, Slovakia, Hungary, Romania and southern Russia.

The larvae feed on Artemisia maritima. They feed on the generative organs of their host plant.
