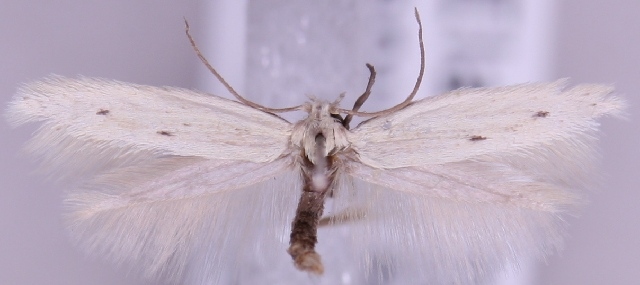

Scientific classification
- Domain: Eukaryota
- Kingdom: Animalia
- Phylum: Arthropoda
- Class: Insecta
- Order: Lepidoptera
- Family: Elachistidae
- Genus: Elachista
- Species: E. spumella

Binomial name
- Elachista spumella Caradja, 1920

= Elachista spumella =

Species of moth

Elachista spumella is a moth of the family Elachistidae. It is found in Italy, Austria, Hungary, Slovakia, the Czech Republic and Russia.
