= Coleophora achaenivora =

Scientific classification
- Kingdom: Animalia
- Phylum: Arthropoda
- Class: Insecta
- Order: Lepidoptera
- Family: Coleophoridae
- Genus: Coleophora
- Species: C. achaenivora

Binomial name
- Coleophora achaenivora Hofmann, 1877

Synonyms
- Coleophora paratanaceti Toll, 1961

Species of moth

Coleophora achaenivora is a moth of the family Coleophoridae. It is found in Spain, France, Germany and Austria.

The larvae feed on Casignetella species.
