= Bucculatrix fatigatella =

Scientific classification
- Kingdom: Animalia
- Phylum: Arthropoda
- Clade: Pancrustacea
- Class: Insecta
- Order: Lepidoptera
- Family: Bucculatricidae
- Genus: Bucculatrix
- Species: B. fatigatella

Binomial name
- Bucculatrix fatigatella Heyden, 1863

Species of moth

Bucculatrix fatigatella is a moth in the family Bucculatricidae. It was described by Carl von Heyden in 1863. It is found in the Alps.
