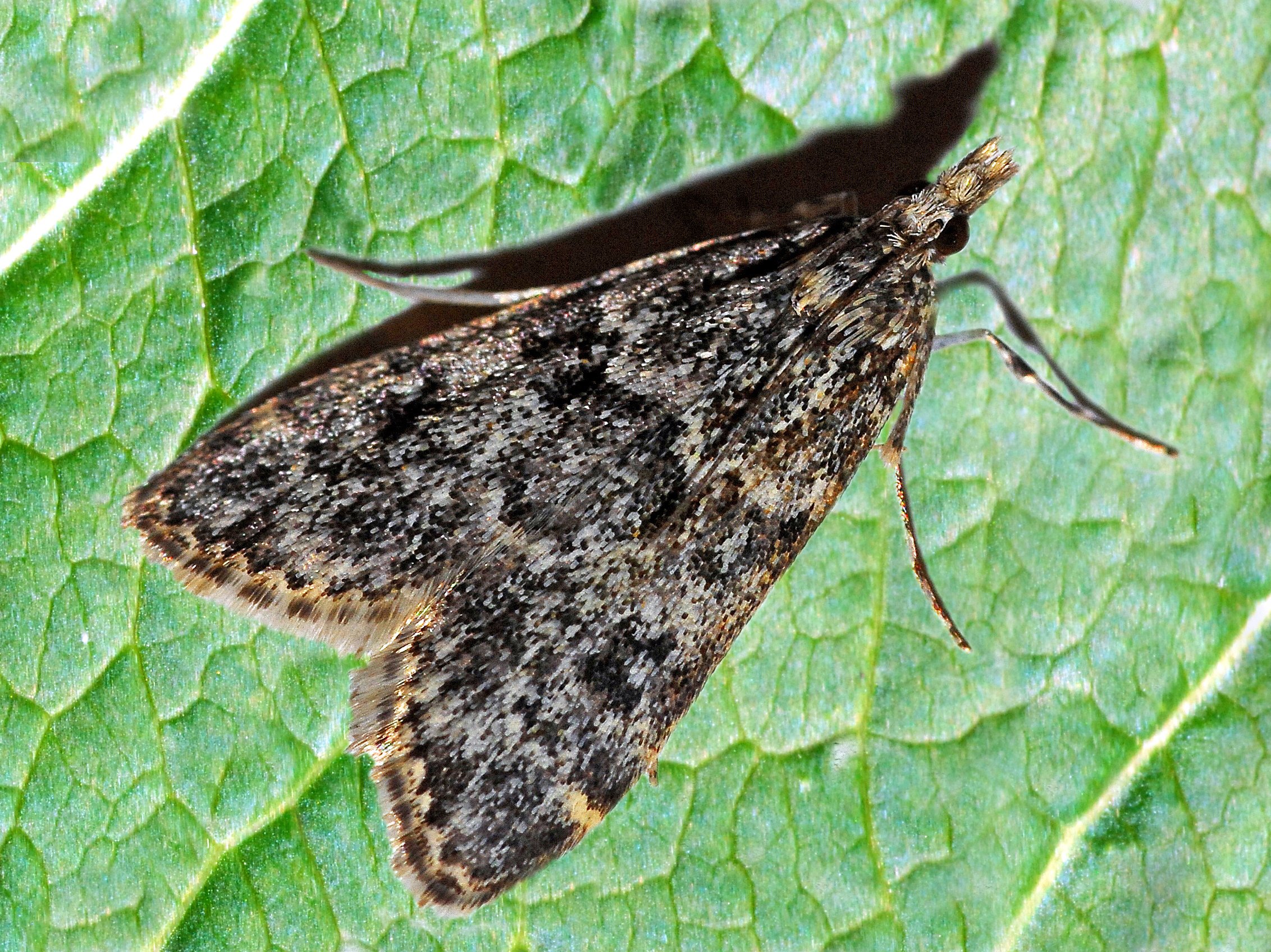

Scientific classification
- Kingdom: Animalia
- Phylum: Arthropoda
- Clade: Pancrustacea
- Class: Insecta
- Order: Lepidoptera
- Family: Crambidae
- Genus: Eudonia
- Species: E. phaeoleuca

Binomial name
- Eudonia phaeoleuca (Zeller, 1846)

Synonyms
- List: Eudorea phaeoleuca Zeller, 1846; Eudonia phaeoleuca brosi P. Leraut, 1982; Eudorea sciaphilella La Harpe, 1855; Scoparia (Dipleurina) fuscella Turati, 1915; Scoparia murana nevadensis Zerny in Rebel & Zerny, 1927; Scoparia (Eudoria) phaeoleuca f. gratiatella Turati, 1915; Scoparia bielnalis Rougemont, 1903; Eudonia phaeoleuca sororcula P. Leraut, 1982

= Eudonia phaeoleuca =

Species of moth

Eudonia phaeoleuca is a species of nocturnal moth in the family Crambidae.

== Subspecies ==
- Eudonia phaeoleuca phaeoleuca Zeller, 1846
- Eudonia phaeoleuca fuscella (Turati, 1915) (Italy)
- Eudonia phaeoleuca nevadensis (Zerny in Rebel & Zerny, 1927) (Spain)

== Etymology ==
The species name derives from the Greek word φαιός, meaning grey, and refers to the color of the wings.

== Distribution ==
This species can be found in Spain, France, Italy, Switzerland, Austria, Germany, Poland, Slovakia, on the Balkan Peninsula, in Turkey and in Russia.

== Description ==
These rather inconspicuous moths are usually greyish-brownish. Their labial palps are elongated and project straightly, This species is very similar to Eudonia lacustrata (Panzer, 1804).

== Biology ==
These moths are nocturnal. Adults fly from July to September. They develop a complete metamorphosis which involves a pupal stage(holometabolous). It can be assumed that they feed on mosses, as in the most related species.

== Bibliography ==
- Rákosy, L., Goia, M. & Z. Kovács (2003): Catalogul Lepidopterelor României – Verzeichnis der Schmetterlinge Rumäniens: 1-447. Cluj-Napoca (Societatea lepidopterologică romană) [PDF auf lepidoptera.ro].
- Erstbeschreibung: Zeller, P. C. (1846): Die Arten der Gattung Eudorea. — Linnaea Entomologica 1: 262-318 + tab. 2.
