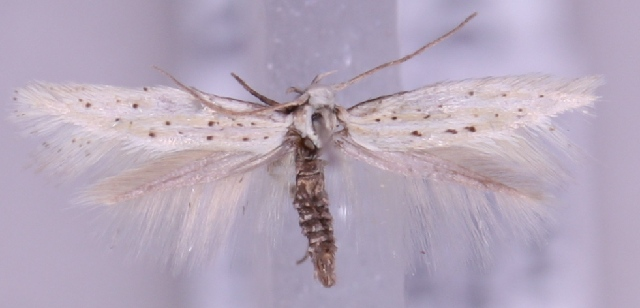

Scientific classification
- Domain: Eukaryota
- Kingdom: Animalia
- Phylum: Arthropoda
- Class: Insecta
- Order: Lepidoptera
- Family: Elachistidae
- Genus: Elachista
- Species: E. hedemanni

Binomial name
- Elachista hedemanni Rebel, 1899

Synonyms
- Elachista tauricella Sinev & Sruoga, 1991

= Elachista hedemanni =

Species of moth

Elachista hedemanni is a moth of the family Elachistidae. It is found from Germany to Spain and Romania. It is also found in Ukraine and Russia.

The wingspan is 8–9 millimetres (0.31–0.35 in).

The larvae feed on Carex humilis, Holcus mollis and Stipa pennata. They mine the leaves of their host plant. The mine starts at the base of the blade of a leaf of the previous year. Larvae can be found from July to April.
