= Coleophora ciconiella =

Scientific classification
- Kingdom: Animalia
- Phylum: Arthropoda
- Class: Insecta
- Order: Lepidoptera
- Family: Coleophoridae
- Genus: Coleophora
- Species: C. ciconiella

Binomial name
- Coleophora ciconiella Herrich-Schaffer, 1855

Synonyms
- Coleophora tritici Lindeman, 1881

Species of moth

Coleophora ciconiella is a moth of the family Coleophoridae. It is found from Germany to the Iberian Peninsula, Italy and Bulgaria.

The larvae feed on Avena sativa and Triticum species. Larvae can be found from October to June.
