= Coleophora longicornella =

Scientific classification
- Kingdom: Animalia
- Phylum: Arthropoda
- Class: Insecta
- Order: Lepidoptera
- Family: Coleophoridae
- Genus: Coleophora
- Species: C. longicornella

Binomial name
- Coleophora longicornella Constant, 1893

Species of moth

Coleophora longicornella is a moth of the family Coleophoridae. It is found from France to Italy, Greece and Hungary.

The larvae feed on Aster tripolium. Full-grown larvae can be found as late as July.
