= Coleophora obtectella =

Scientific classification
- Kingdom: Animalia
- Phylum: Arthropoda
- Clade: Pancrustacea
- Class: Insecta
- Order: Lepidoptera
- Family: Coleophoridae
- Genus: Coleophora
- Species: C. obtectella

Binomial name
- Coleophora obtectella Zeller, 1849

Synonyms
- Coleophora trifisella Rebel, 1910

Species of moth

Coleophora obtectella is a moth of the family Coleophoridae. It is found from Austria to Spain, Sicily and Crete and from France to Bulgaria.

The larvae feed on Satureja cuneifolia, Satureja montana and Thymus serpyllum. Larvae can be found from autumn to June.
