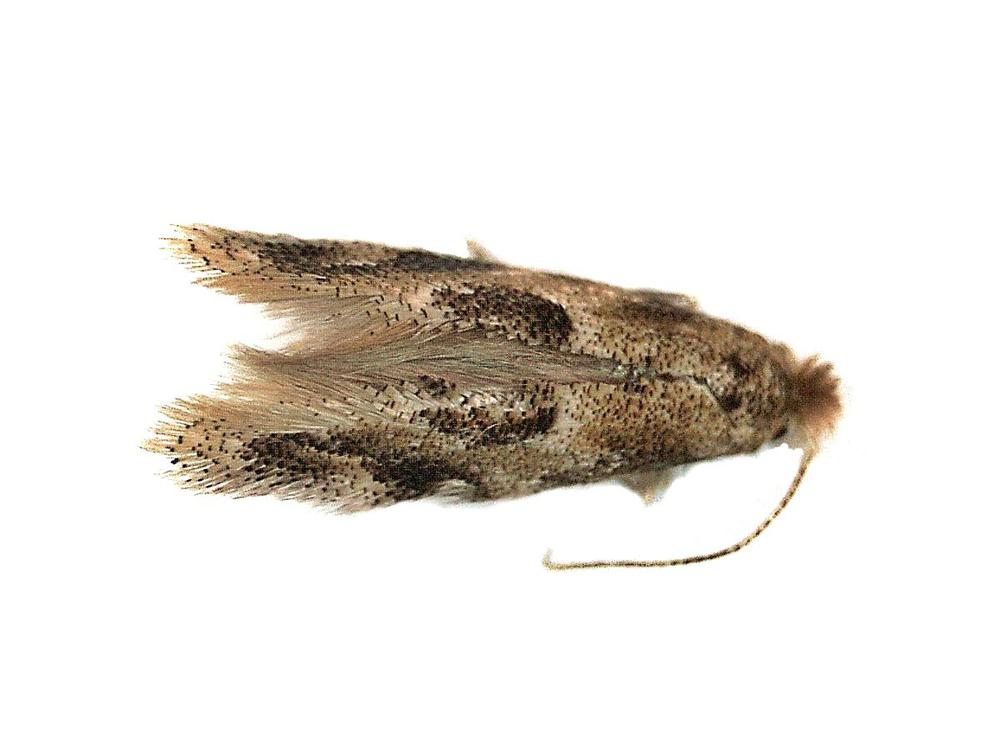

Scientific classification
- Kingdom: Animalia
- Phylum: Arthropoda
- Clade: Pancrustacea
- Class: Insecta
- Order: Lepidoptera
- Family: Bucculatricidae
- Genus: Bucculatrix
- Species: B. ulmifoliae

Binomial name
- Bucculatrix ulmifoliae M. Hering, 1931

= Bucculatrix ulmifoliae =

Species of moth

Bucculatrix ulmifoliae is a moth in the family Bucculatricidae. It was described by Erich Martin Hering in 1931. It is found in Great Britain, the Netherlands, Germany, central and eastern Europe. It has also been recorded from Iran.

The wingspan is 6–7 mm Adults are on wing from April to May and again in July in two generations per year.

The larvae feed on Ulmus glabra, Ulmus laevis and Ulmus minor.
