= Coleophora albilineella =

Scientific classification
- Kingdom: Animalia
- Phylum: Arthropoda
- Class: Insecta
- Order: Lepidoptera
- Family: Coleophoridae
- Genus: Coleophora
- Species: C. albilineella

Binomial name
- Coleophora albilineella Toll, 1960

Synonyms
- Coleophora bucovinella Nemeş, 1968

Species of moth

Coleophora albilineella is a moth of the family Coleophoridae. It is found in Spain, France, Sardinia, Austria, the Czech Republic, Slovakia, Hungary, Romania, Greece and southern Russia.
