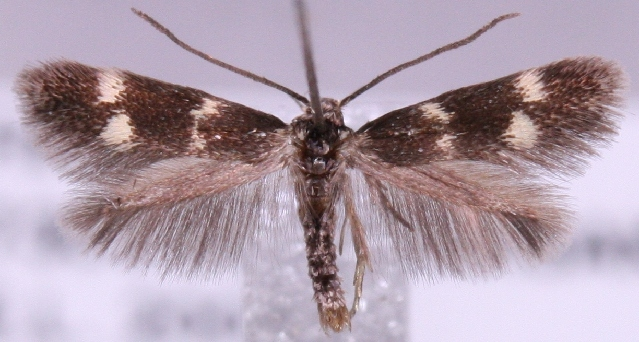

Scientific classification
- Domain: Eukaryota
- Kingdom: Animalia
- Phylum: Arthropoda
- Class: Insecta
- Order: Lepidoptera
- Family: Elachistidae
- Genus: Elachista
- Species: E. diederichsiella

Binomial name
- Elachista diederichsiella E. Hering, 1889

= Elachista diederichsiella =

Species of moth

Elachista diederichsiella is a moth of the family Elachistidae. It is found from Fennoscandia and northern Russia to the Pyrenees, Alps and Carpathian Mountains, and from France to central Russia. It is also found in North America.

The wingspan is 9–11 millimetres (0.35–0.43 in). Adults are on wing from June to August.

The larvae feed on Holcus mollis and Milium effusum. They mine the leaves of their host plant. Pupation takes place outside of the mine. Larvae can be found from April to May.
