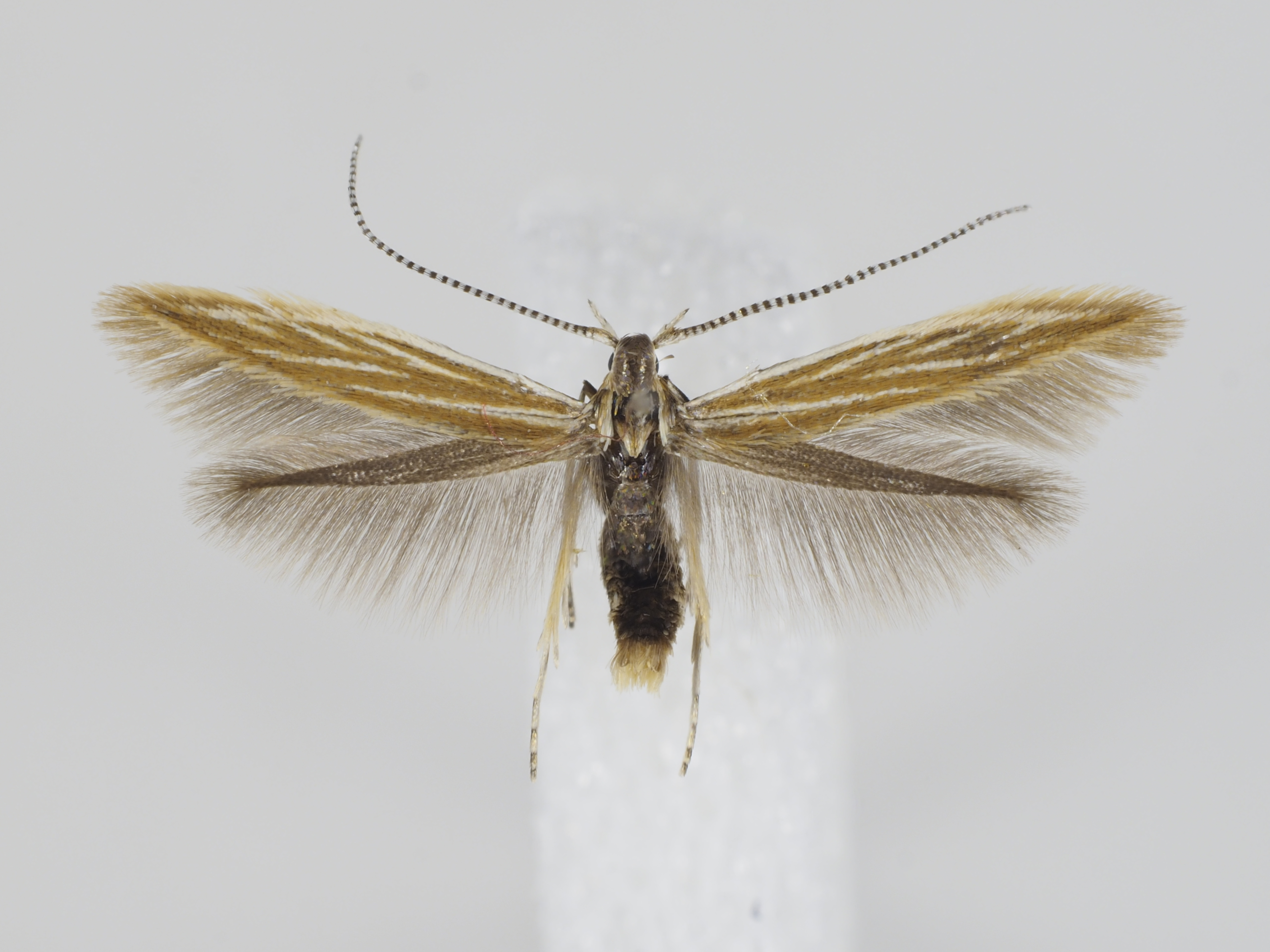

Scientific classification
- Kingdom: Animalia
- Phylum: Arthropoda
- Class: Insecta
- Order: Lepidoptera
- Family: Coleophoridae
- Genus: Coleophora
- Species: C. gardesanella

Binomial name
- Coleophora gardesanella Toll, 1954

Synonyms
- Coleophora machinella Bradley, 1971

= Coleophora gardesanella =

Species of moth

Coleophora gardesanella is a moth of the family Coleophoridae. It has a disjunct distribution, from Finland to the Pyrenees and Italy, and from Great Britain to the Baltic States and North Macedonia.

The wingspan is 9.5–11 mm. Adults are on wing from June to August in western Europe.

The larvae feed on Achillea millefolium, Achillea ptarmica, Artemisia maritima, Artemisia vulgaris, Centaurea jacea, Chrysanthemum leucanthemum and Tanacetum vulgare. Larvae can be found from September to May.
