= Coleophora campestriphaga =

Scientific classification
- Kingdom: Animalia
- Phylum: Arthropoda
- Clade: Pancrustacea
- Class: Insecta
- Order: Lepidoptera
- Family: Coleophoridae
- Genus: Coleophora
- Species: C. campestriphaga

Binomial name
- Coleophora campestriphaga Baldizzone & Patzak, 1980

Species of moth

Coleophora campestriphaga is a moth of the family Coleophoridae. It is found from Germany, the Czech Republic, Slovakia, Austria and Romania. Full-grown larvae can be found in March and May.
