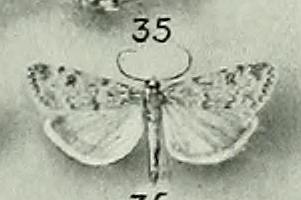

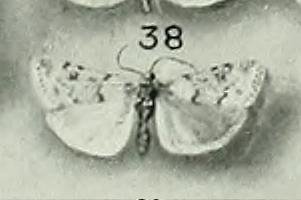

Scientific classification
- Kingdom: Animalia
- Phylum: Arthropoda
- Class: Insecta
- Order: Lepidoptera
- Family: Crambidae
- Genus: Scoparia
- Species: S. italica

Binomial name
- Scoparia italica Turati, 1919

Synonyms
- Scoparia manifestella var. meridionalis Klimesch, 1950

= Scoparia italica =

Species of moth

Scoparia italica is a species of moth in the family Crambidae. It is found in Italy, Austria and Switzerland.
