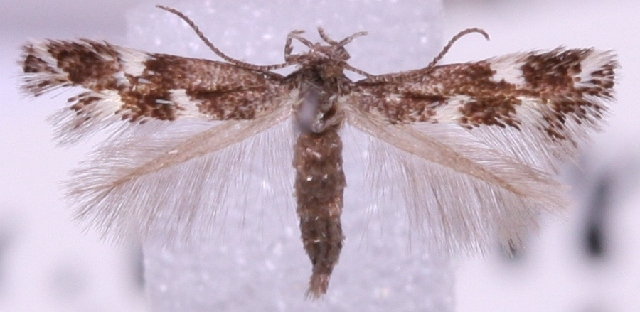

Scientific classification
- Domain: Eukaryota
- Kingdom: Animalia
- Phylum: Arthropoda
- Class: Insecta
- Order: Lepidoptera
- Family: Elachistidae
- Genus: Elachista
- Species: E. martinii

Binomial name
- Elachista martinii O. Hofmann, 1898

= Elachista martinii =

Species of moth

Elachista martinii is a moth of the family Elachistidae that is found from Germany and Latvia to Italy and Greece. It is also found in Russia.

The larvae feed on Carex humilis. They mine the leaves of their host plant. Larvae can be found from September to June.
