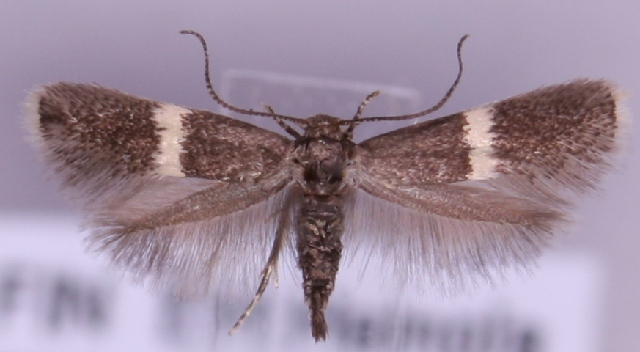

Scientific classification
- Domain: Eukaryota
- Kingdom: Animalia
- Phylum: Arthropoda
- Class: Insecta
- Order: Lepidoptera
- Family: Elachistidae
- Genus: Elachista
- Species: E. cingillella

Binomial name
- Elachista cingillella (Herrich-Schäffer, 1855)

Synonyms
- Poeciloptilia cingillella Herrich-Schäffer, 1855

= Elachista cingillella =

Species of moth

Elachista cingillella is a moth of the family Elachistidae found in Europe.

== Description ==
The wingspan is 8.5–10 millimetres (0.33–0.39 in). Adults have been recorded in May.

The larvae feed on upright brome (Bromus erectus), wood millet (Milium effusum) and Dichanthium ischaemum mining the leaves of their host plant. Larvae can be found from September to April and again from June to early August. Larvae of the first generation overwinter within the mine.

== Distribution ==
It is found from Fennoscandia and Russia to the Pyrenees and Alps and from Great Britain to Romania.
