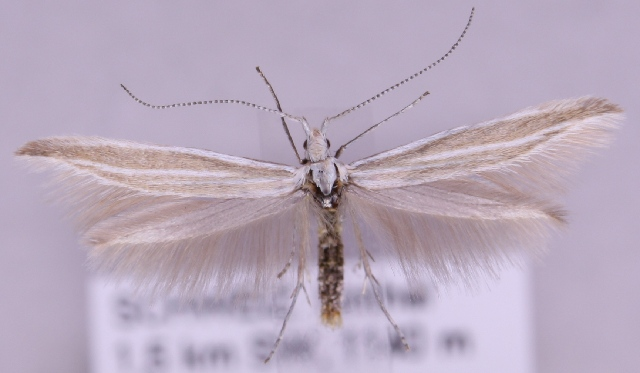

Scientific classification
- Kingdom: Animalia
- Phylum: Arthropoda
- Class: Insecta
- Order: Lepidoptera
- Family: Coleophoridae
- Genus: Coleophora
- Species: C. rectilineella

Binomial name
- Coleophora rectilineella Fischer von Röslerstamm, 1843

= Coleophora rectilineella =

Species of moth

Coleophora rectilineella is a moth of the family Coleophoridae. It is found from France and Italy to Romania.

The larvae feed on Alchemilla alpina, Anemone, Anthyllis vulneraria alpestris, Aster amellus, Centaurea jaceak, Cerastium, Globularia cordifolia, Leucanthemopsis alpine, Leucanthemum, Primula elatior, Primula farinosa, Ranunculus acris and Salix reticulata. Larvae can be found from August to May.
