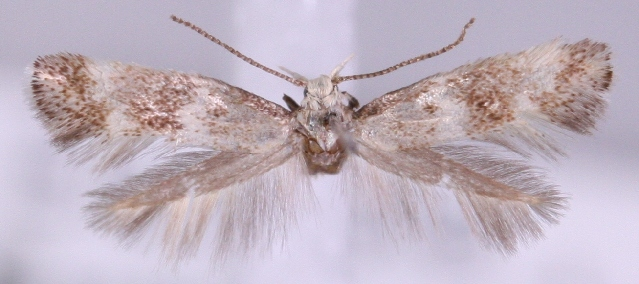

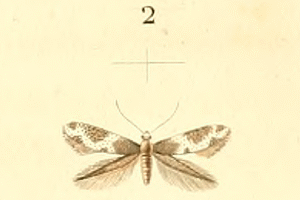

Scientific classification
- Domain: Eukaryota
- Kingdom: Animalia
- Phylum: Arthropoda
- Class: Insecta
- Order: Lepidoptera
- Family: Elachistidae
- Genus: Elachista
- Species: E. squamosella

Binomial name
- Elachista squamosella (Duponchel, 1843)

Synonyms
- Oecophora squamosella Duponchel, 1843

= Elachista squamosella =

Species of moth

Elachista squamosella is a moth of the family Elachistidae. It is found from Germany and Ukraine to the Iberian Peninsula, Italy and Greece. It is also found in Russia.

The wingspan is 8–9 mm.

The larvae feed on Carex montana. They mine the leaves of their host plant.
