= Coleophora settarii =

Scientific classification
- Kingdom: Animalia
- Phylum: Arthropoda
- Clade: Pancrustacea
- Class: Insecta
- Order: Lepidoptera
- Family: Coleophoridae
- Genus: Coleophora
- Species: C. settarii

Binomial name
- Coleophora settarii Wocke, 1877

Species of moth

Coleophora settarii is a moth of the family Coleophoridae. It is found in France, Switzerland, Austria and Italy.

The larvae feed on Artemisia alba, Artemisia caerulescens gallica, Artemisia campestris and Artemisia campestris maritima. Larvae can be found September to May.
