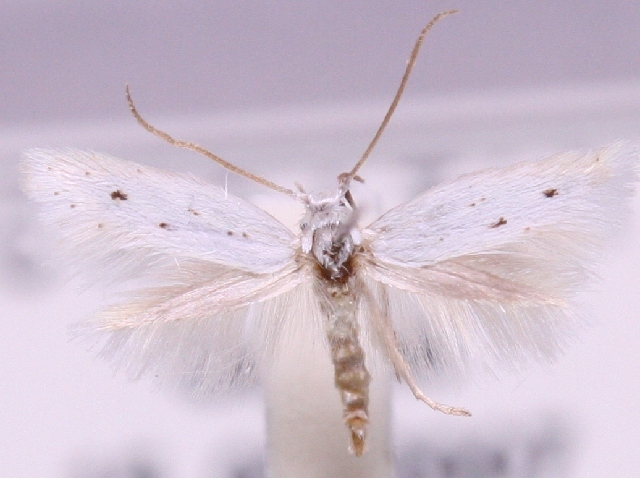

Scientific classification
- Kingdom: Animalia
- Phylum: Arthropoda
- Class: Insecta
- Order: Lepidoptera
- Family: Elachistidae
- Genus: Elachista
- Species: E. dalmatiensis

Binomial name
- Elachista dalmatiensis Traugott-Olsen, 1992

= Elachista dalmatiensis =

Species of moth

Elachista dalmatiensis is a moth of the family Elachistidae that is endemic to Austria.
