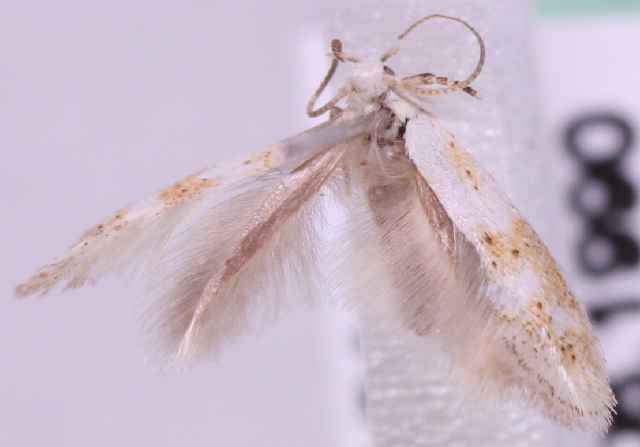

Scientific classification
- Domain: Eukaryota
- Kingdom: Animalia
- Phylum: Arthropoda
- Class: Insecta
- Order: Lepidoptera
- Family: Elachistidae
- Genus: Elachista
- Species: E. nolckeni

Binomial name
- Elachista nolckeni Šulcs, 1992

= Elachista nolckeni =

Species of moth

Elachista nolckeni is a moth of the family Elachistidae. It is found from Estonia to the Pyrenees and Italy and from France to Poland and Slovakia. It is also found in Russia.

The wingspan is 8–10 millimetres (0.31–0.39 in).

The larvae feed on Phleum phleoides. They mine the leaves of their host plant.
