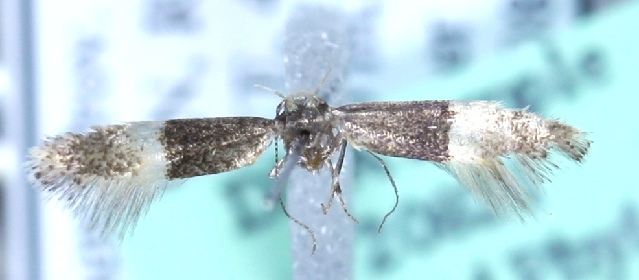

Scientific classification
- Kingdom: Animalia
- Phylum: Arthropoda
- Clade: Pancrustacea
- Class: Insecta
- Order: Lepidoptera
- Family: Elachistidae
- Genus: Elachista
- Species: E. revinctella

Binomial name
- Elachista revinctella Zeller, 1850

= Elachista revinctella =

Species of moth

Elachista revinctella is a moth of the family Elachistidae. It is found in France, Italy, Austria, Hungary and Croatia.

== Taxonomy ==
The species was treated as a synonym of Elachista adscitella, but was reinstated as a species by Parenti in 1992.
