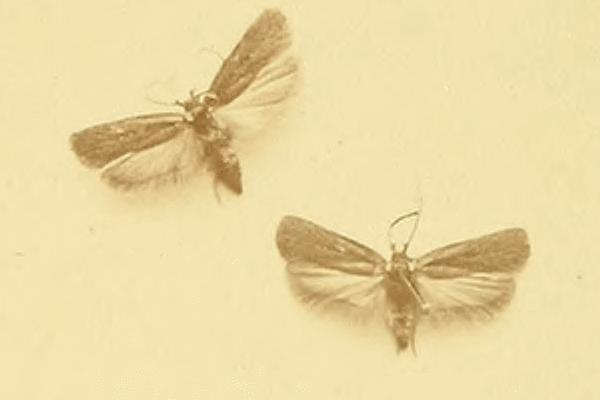

Scientific classification
- Kingdom: Animalia
- Phylum: Arthropoda
- Clade: Pancrustacea
- Class: Insecta
- Order: Lepidoptera
- Family: Depressariidae
- Genus: Agonopterix
- Species: A. oinochroa

Binomial name
- Agonopterix oinochroa (Turati, 1879)

Synonyms
- Depressaria oinochroa Turati, 1879

= Agonopterix oinochroa =

Species of moth

Agonopterix oinochroa is a moth of the family Depressariidae. It is found in France, Spain, Germany, Austria, Switzerland, Italy, the Czech Republic, Slovakia, Hungary and North Macedonia.

The wingspan is 14–18 mm.

The larvae feed on Pimpenella saxifraga, Daucus carota and Sium latifolium.
