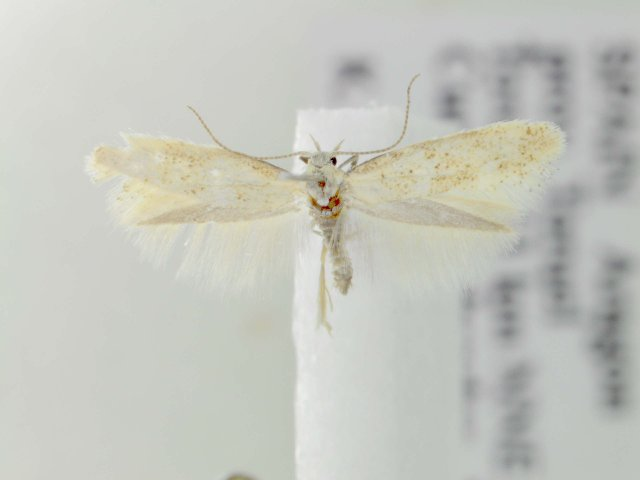

Scientific classification
- Kingdom: Animalia
- Phylum: Arthropoda
- Clade: Pancrustacea
- Class: Insecta
- Order: Lepidoptera
- Family: Elachistidae
- Genus: Elachista
- Species: E. lugdunensis

Binomial name
- Elachista lugdunensis Frey, 1859

Synonyms
- Elachista coeneni Traugott-Olsen, 1985

= Elachista lugdunensis =

Species of moth

Elachista lugdunensis is a moth of the family Elachistidae that can be found in Portugal, Spain, France, Germany, Austria and Sweden.

The wingspan is about 7–8 millimetres (0.28–0.31 in). Adults are pale with indistinct ochreous or brownish irroration on the forewings.
