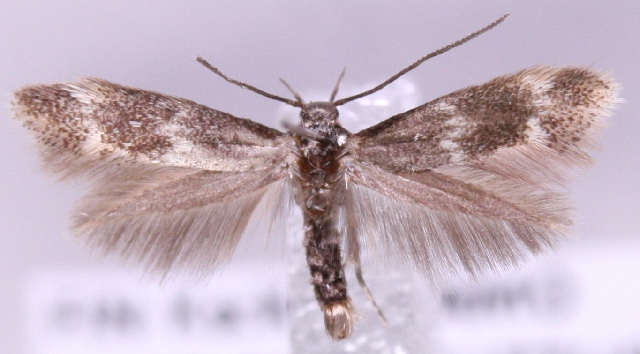

Scientific classification
- Domain: Eukaryota
- Kingdom: Animalia
- Phylum: Arthropoda
- Class: Insecta
- Order: Lepidoptera
- Family: Elachistidae
- Genus: Elachista
- Species: E. kilmunella

Binomial name
- Elachista kilmunella Stainton, 1849

= Elachista kilmunella =

Species of moth

Elachista kilmunella is a moth of the family Elachistidae found in Europe.

== Description ==
The wingspan is 8–12 millimetres (0.31–0.47 in). Adults are on wing from May to August. The head is grey, whitish sprinkled. Forewings are dark grey, basal area in female whitish; a nearly straight fascia before middle, a tornal spot and costal spot beyond it united into a rather irregular fascia whitish, in female clearer; cilia round apex more whitish. Hindwings are rather dark grey.

== Biology ==
The larvae feed on greater pond sedge (Carex riparia) and hare's-tail cottongrass (Eriophorum vaginatum) mining the leaves of their host plant. They are yellowish grey. Larvae can be found from April to July.

== Distribution ==
It is found from northern Europe to the Alps and Hungary and from Ireland to Russia.
