= Coleophora fuscociliella =

Scientific classification
- Kingdom: Animalia
- Phylum: Arthropoda
- Clade: Pancrustacea
- Class: Insecta
- Order: Lepidoptera
- Family: Coleophoridae
- Genus: Coleophora
- Species: C. fuscociliella

Binomial name
- Coleophora fuscociliella Zeller, 1849

Synonyms
- Coleophora medicaginis Herrich-Schäffer, 1861; Quadratia bucovinae Nemes, 2004

Species of moth

Coleophora fuscociliella is a moth of the family Coleophoridae. It is found from Germany and Poland to Italy, North Macedonia, and Romania. It is also known in southern Russia.

The larvae feed on Coronilla and Medicago species. Larvae can be found from autumn to June of the following year.
