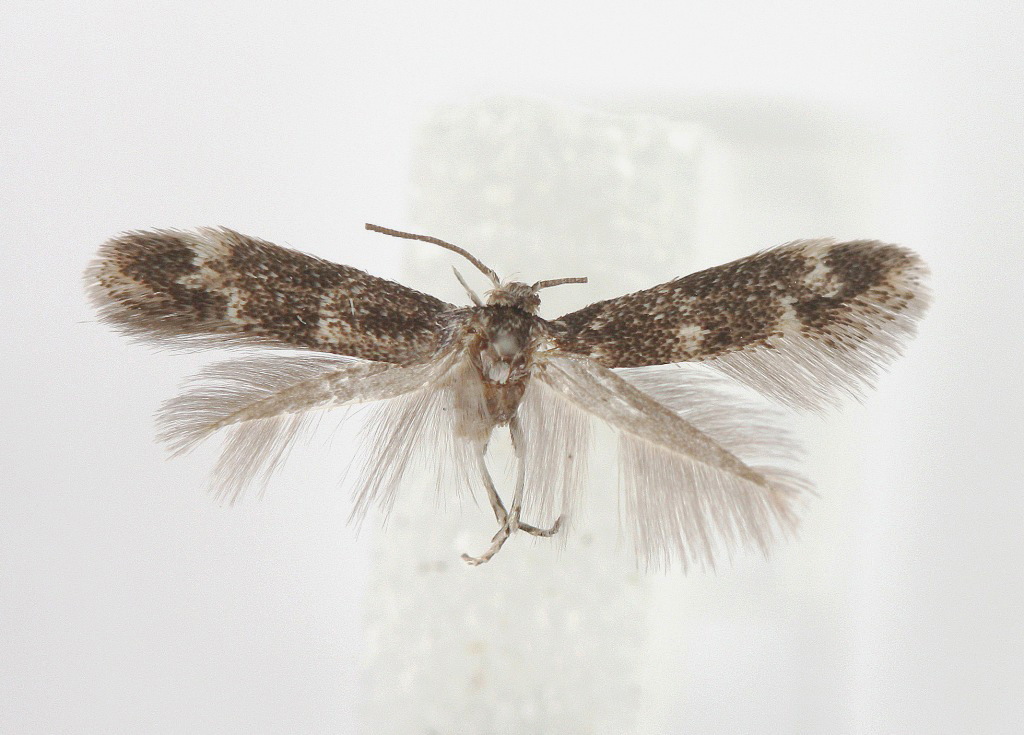

Scientific classification
- Kingdom: Animalia
- Phylum: Arthropoda
- Class: Insecta
- Order: Lepidoptera
- Family: Elachistidae
- Genus: Elachista
- Species: E. zernyi

Binomial name
- Elachista zernyi Hartig, 1941

Synonyms
- Elachista ingvarella Traugott-Olsen, 1974

= Elachista zernyi =

Species of moth

Elachista zernyi is a moth of the family Elachistidae that is found in Fennoscandia, Germany, Austria, Switzerland and Italy. It is also found in North America.

The wingspan is 10–11 millimetres (0.39–0.43 in).
