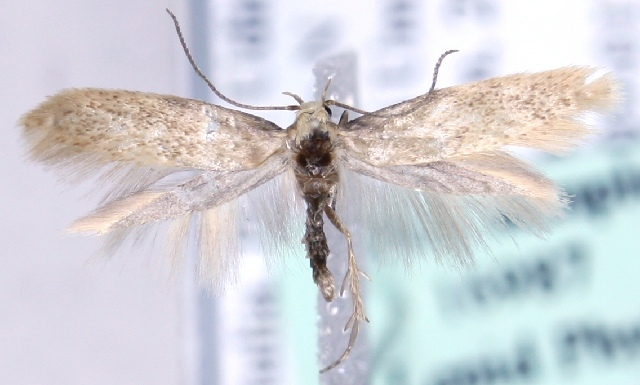

Scientific classification
- Kingdom: Animalia
- Phylum: Arthropoda
- Class: Insecta
- Order: Lepidoptera
- Family: Elachistidae
- Genus: Elachista
- Species: E. heinemanni

Binomial name
- Elachista heinemanni Frey, 1866

Synonyms
- Elachista immolatella Zeller, 1868

= Elachista heinemanni =

Species of moth

Elachista heinemanni is a moth of the family Elachistidae. It is found in the Alps.

The wingspan is 10–12 millimetres (0.39–0.47 in). Adults are on wing from the first half of June to the first half of August.

The larvae feed on Sesleria albicans. They mine the leaves of their host plant. They are olive grey.
