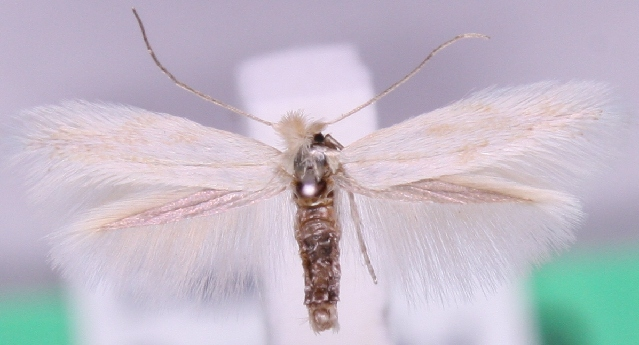

Scientific classification
- Kingdom: Animalia
- Phylum: Arthropoda
- Clade: Pancrustacea
- Class: Insecta
- Order: Lepidoptera
- Family: Bucculatricidae
- Genus: Bucculatrix
- Species: B. absinthii

Binomial name
- Bucculatrix absinthii Gartner, 1865

Synonyms
- Bucculatrix valesiaca Frey, 1870

= Bucculatrix absinthii =

Species of moth

Bucculatrix absinthii is a moth in the family Bucculatricidae. It was first described by Anton Gartner in 1865. It is found in Europe, from Scandinavia to France and Italy and from Germany to Romania.

The wingspan is 8–9 mm. Adults are on wing from June to September in two generations per year.

The larvae feed on Artemisia absinthium. They mine the leaves of their host plant. Larvae can be found from April to May and in July. The species probably overwinters as an egg or young larva.
