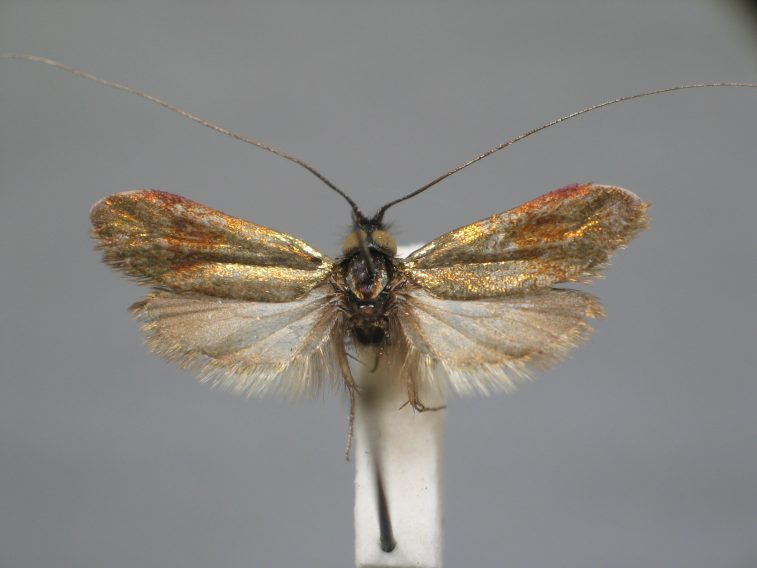

Scientific classification
- Kingdom: Animalia
- Phylum: Arthropoda
- Clade: Pancrustacea
- Class: Insecta
- Order: Lepidoptera
- Family: Adelidae
- Genus: Nemophora
- Species: N. prodigellus

Binomial name
- Nemophora prodigellus (Zeller, 1853)

Synonyms
- Nemotois prodigellus Zeller, 1853; Nemotois auricellus Ragonot, 1874; Nemotois splendidus Staudinger, 1880

= Nemophora prodigellus =

Species of moth

Nemophora prodigellus is a moth of the Adelidae family. It is found in most of Europe, except Ireland, Great Britain, the Benelux, Portugal, most of the Balkan Peninsula, the Baltic region and Fennoscandia.

The larvae feed on Stachys officinalis.
