= Coleophora kroneella =

Scientific classification
- Kingdom: Animalia
- Phylum: Arthropoda
- Class: Insecta
- Order: Lepidoptera
- Family: Coleophoridae
- Genus: Coleophora
- Species: C. kroneella

Binomial name
- Coleophora kroneella Fuchs, 1899

Species of moth

Coleophora kroneella is a moth of the family Coleophoridae. It is found from Switzerland to Italy and Greece and from Austria to Romania.

The larvae feed on Amelanchier, Pyrus communis and Sorbus. They create a trivalved case of about 7 mm in length. the mouth angle is about 30°. The case is blackish, with a reddish end. Full-grown cases can be found from May to June.
