= Coleophora niveiciliella =

Scientific classification
- Kingdom: Animalia
- Phylum: Arthropoda
- Class: Insecta
- Order: Lepidoptera
- Family: Coleophoridae
- Genus: Coleophora
- Species: C. niveiciliella

Binomial name
- Coleophora niveiciliella Hofmann, 1877

Synonyms
- Coleophora maneella Toll,1962; Eupista edithae Gozmány, 1951

Species of moth

Coleophora niveiciliella is a moth of the family Coleophoridae. It is found in France, Austria, Slovakia and Hungary.

The larvae feed on the leaves of Inula conyza.
