= Elachista svenssoni =

Scientific classification
- Kingdom: Animalia
- Phylum: Arthropoda
- Class: Insecta
- Order: Lepidoptera
- Family: Elachistidae
- Genus: Elachista
- Species: E. svenssoni

Binomial name
- Elachista svenssoni Traugott-Olsen, 1988

Synonyms
- Elachista elsaella

Species of moth

Elachista svenssoni is a moth of the family Elachistidae. It is found in Germany, Switzerland, Austria, the Czech Republic, Slovakia and Hungary.
