= Coleophora repentis =

Scientific classification
- Kingdom: Animalia
- Phylum: Arthropoda
- Clade: Pancrustacea
- Class: Insecta
- Order: Lepidoptera
- Family: Coleophoridae
- Genus: Coleophora
- Species: C. repentis

Binomial name
- Coleophora repentis Klimesch, 1947

Synonyms
- Coleophora franzi Klimesch, 1947

Species of moth

Coleophora repentis is a moth of the family Coleophoridae. It is found in the Alps and the Tatra Mountains.

The larvae feed on Gypsophila repens.
