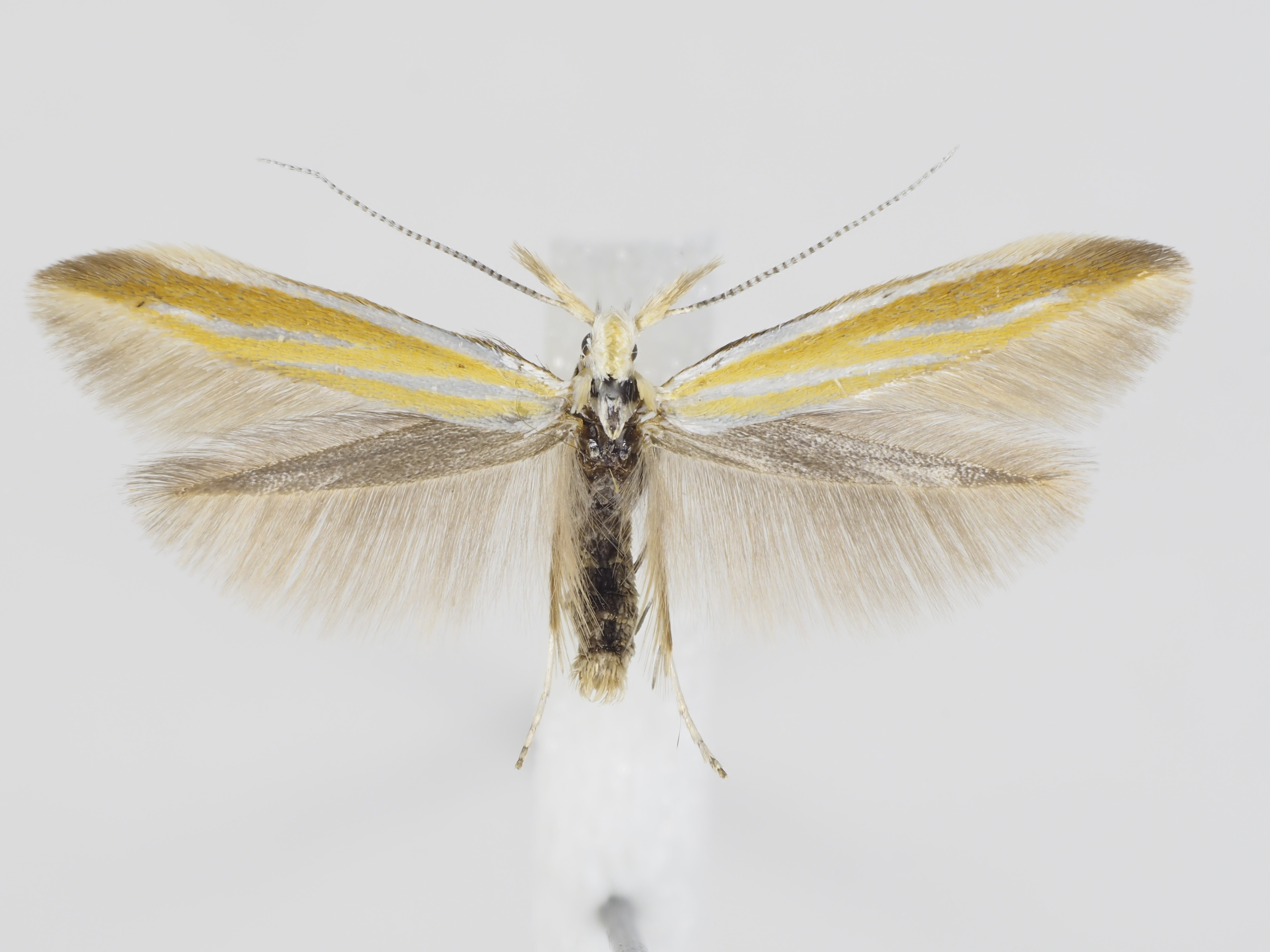

Scientific classification
- Kingdom: Animalia
- Phylum: Arthropoda
- Clade: Pancrustacea
- Class: Insecta
- Order: Lepidoptera
- Family: Coleophoridae
- Genus: Coleophora
- Species: C. partitella

Binomial name
- Coleophora partitella Zeller, 1849

Synonyms
- Ischnophanes davidii Nemes, 2003

= Coleophora partitella =

Species of moth

Coleophora partitella is a moth of the family Coleophoridae. It is found from Fennoscandia and to the Iberian Peninsula, Italy and Romania and from France to Poland.

The wingspan is 16–19 mm. Adults are on wing from June to July.
