= Coleophora accola =

Scientific classification
- Kingdom: Animalia
- Phylum: Arthropoda
- Class: Insecta
- Order: Lepidoptera
- Family: Coleophoridae
- Genus: Coleophora
- Species: C. accola

Binomial name
- Coleophora accola Falkovitsh, 1992

Species of moth

Coleophora accola is a moth of the family Coleophoridae.

The larvae feed on the generative organs of Halothamnus glaucus.
