= Coleophora dormiens =

Scientific classification
- Kingdom: Animalia
- Phylum: Arthropoda
- Class: Insecta
- Order: Lepidoptera
- Family: Coleophoridae
- Genus: Coleophora
- Species: C. dormiens

Binomial name
- Coleophora dormiens Falkovich, 1972

Species of moth

Coleophora dormiens is a moth of the family Coleophoridae. It is found in Turkestan and Uzbekistan.

Adults are on wing in late autumn.

The larvae feed on Halothamnus subaphyllus, Halothamnus glaucus subsp. hispidulus and Halothamnus glaucus subsp. glaucus. Larvae can be found from the end of April to May. Eggs hibernate.
