= Coleophora neolycii =

Scientific classification
- Kingdom: Animalia
- Phylum: Arthropoda
- Class: Insecta
- Order: Lepidoptera
- Family: Coleophoridae
- Genus: Coleophora
- Species: C. neolycii

Binomial name
- Coleophora neolycii H.H.Li, 2006

Species of moth

Coleophora neolycii is a moth of the family Coleophoridae which is endemic to China (Ningxia).

The wingspan is 12.5–13.5 millimetres (0.49–0.53 in).

== Diet and life cycle ==
The larvae feed on Lycium barbarum. They feed in the leaves or stems of their host plant.

Adults emerge in May.

== Etymology ==
The specific name is derived from the Greek prefix neo- (meaning new) and the specific name lycii, in reference to its relationship with Coleophora lycii.
