= Coleophora galligena =

Scientific classification
- Kingdom: Animalia
- Phylum: Arthropoda
- Class: Insecta
- Order: Lepidoptera
- Family: Coleophoridae
- Genus: Coleophora
- Species: C. galligena

Binomial name
- Coleophora galligena Falkovitsh, 1979

Species of moth

Coleophora galligena is a moth of the family Coleophoridae. It is found in Central Asia (including Turkestan and Uzbekistan), Jordan and Pakistan.

The larvae feed on Haloxylon persicum. Larvae can be found from August to September and (after hibernation) from April to May.
