= Coleophora haloxyli =

Scientific classification
- Kingdom: Animalia
- Phylum: Arthropoda
- Class: Insecta
- Order: Lepidoptera
- Family: Coleophoridae
- Genus: Coleophora
- Species: C. haloxyli

Binomial name
- Coleophora haloxyli Falkovitsh, 1970

Species of moth

Coleophora haloxyli is a moth of the family Coleophoridae. It is found in Turkestan and Uzbekistan.

The larvae feed on Haloxylon persicum. Larvae can be found from September to October.
