= Coleophora tshogoni =

Scientific classification
- Kingdom: Animalia
- Phylum: Arthropoda
- Class: Insecta
- Order: Lepidoptera
- Family: Coleophoridae
- Genus: Coleophora
- Species: C. tshogoni

Binomial name
- Coleophora tshogoni Falkovich, 1972

Species of moth

Coleophora tshogoni is a moth of the family Coleophoridae. It is found in Turkestan and Uzbekistan.

The larvae feed on Halothamnus subaphyllus and rarely on Halothamnus glaucus. Larvae can be found from May to the beginning of October. There are up to three generations per year.
