= Coleophora coracipennella =

Scientific classification
- Kingdom: Animalia
- Phylum: Arthropoda
- Class: Insecta
- Order: Lepidoptera
- Family: Coleophoridae
- Genus: Coleophora
- Species: C. coracipennella

Binomial name
- Coleophora coracipennella (Hübner, 1796)

Synonyms
- Tinea coracipennella Hubner, 1796

Species of moth

Coleophora coracipennella is a moth of the family Coleophoridae. The species is found in Europe and was first described by Jacob Hübner in 1796.

The wingspan is 8.5–11.5 mm (0.33–0.45 in). The moth flies from June to July depending on the location.

The larvae feed on Prunus spinosa, Prunus padus, Prunus cerasus and other Prunus species, as well as on apples and Crataegus.

== Distribution ==
The moth is known from Europe, where it is found from Germany to Sicily and from Great Britain to Romania. It has also been recorded from Estonia and southern Russia.
