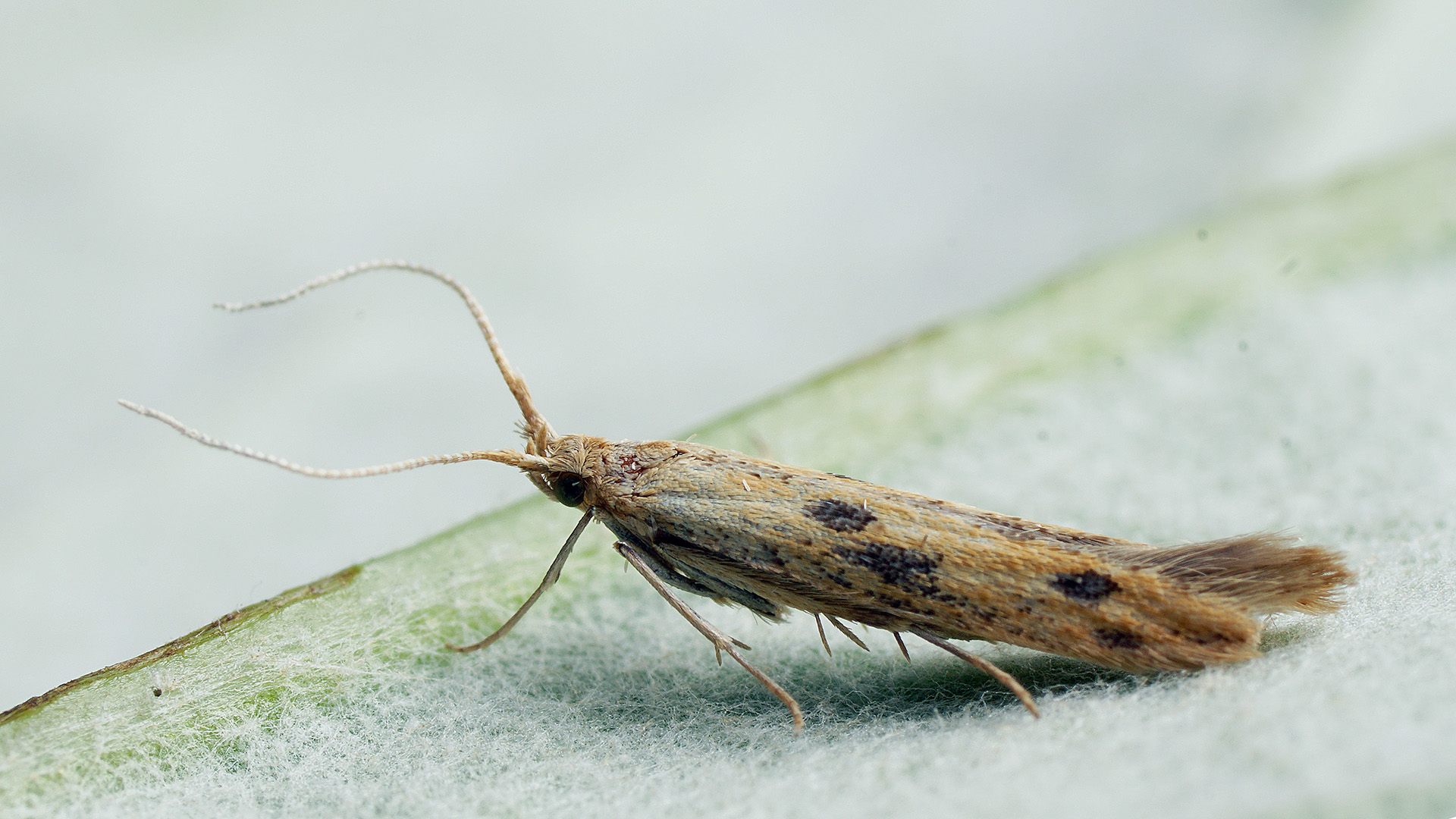

Scientific classification
- Kingdom: Animalia
- Phylum: Arthropoda
- Clade: Pancrustacea
- Class: Insecta
- Order: Lepidoptera
- Family: Coleophoridae
- Genus: Coleophora
- Species: C. squalorella

Binomial name
- Coleophora squalorella Zeller, 1849

Synonyms
- Carpochena squalorella

= Coleophora squalorella =

Species of moth

Coleophora squalorella is a moth of the family Coleophoridae. It is found from Fennoscandia to Austria, Croatia, Romania and Ukraine and from the Netherlands to the Baltic states. It is also known from the lower Volga and Ural regions of Russia and China. It occurs in steppe and semi-desert biotopes.

The wingspan is 12–14 mm (0.47–0.55 in). Adults are on wing in August.

The larvae feed on Chenopodium album, Chenopodium rubrum, Chenopodium murale and possibly Atriplex species. They feed on the generative organs of their host plant.
