= Coleophora biseriatella =

Scientific classification
- Kingdom: Animalia
- Phylum: Arthropoda
- Class: Insecta
- Order: Lepidoptera
- Family: Coleophoridae
- Genus: Coleophora
- Species: C. biseriatella

Binomial name
- Coleophora biseriatella Staudinger, 1859

Species of moth

Coleophora biseriatella is a moth of the family Coleophoridae. It is found in Spain.
