= Coleophora obducta =

Scientific classification
- Kingdom: Animalia
- Phylum: Arthropoda
- Class: Insecta
- Order: Lepidoptera
- Family: Coleophoridae
- Genus: Coleophora
- Species: C. obducta

Binomial name
- Coleophora obducta (Meyrick, 1931)

Synonyms
- Protocryptis obducta Meyrick, 1931; Coleophora dahurica Falkovitsh, 1964; Coleophora longisignella Moriuti, 1972

Species of moth

Coleophora obducta is a moth of the family Coleophoridae. It is found in Japan and Russia (Baikal).

The wingspan is 8–10 mm (0.31–0.39 in).

The larvae feed on Larix leptolepis and Larix gmelinii. They feed on the conifer needles of their host plant.
