= Coleophora bilineatella =

Scientific classification
- Kingdom: Animalia
- Phylum: Arthropoda
- Class: Insecta
- Order: Lepidoptera
- Family: Coleophoridae
- Genus: Coleophora
- Species: C. bilineatella

Binomial name
- Coleophora bilineatella Zeller, 1849

Synonyms
- Coleophora perserenella Rebel, 1919; Coleophora sergii Gozmany, 1956

Species of moth

Coleophora bilineatella is a moth of the family Coleophoridae. It was described by Zeller in 1849. It is found from Germany to the Iberian Peninsula, Sardinia, Italy and Greece and from France to Romania.

The larvae feed on Dorycnium pentaphyllum, Dorycnium pentaphyllum germanicum and Dorycnium pentaphyllum herbaceum. Full-grown larvae can be found from June to April. Hibernation occurs at the foot of the hostplant.
