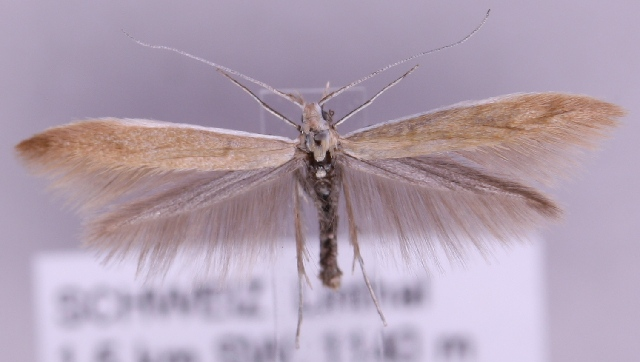

Scientific classification
- Kingdom: Animalia
- Phylum: Arthropoda
- Class: Insecta
- Order: Lepidoptera
- Family: Coleophoridae
- Genus: Coleophora
- Species: C. niveicostella

Binomial name
- Coleophora niveicostella Zeller, 1839

Synonyms
- Amseliphora niveicostella; Coleophora longicostella Stainton, 1867

= Coleophora niveicostella =

Species of moth

Coleophora niveicostella is a moth of the family Coleophoridae and was first described by Philipp Christoph Zeller in 1839. It is found from Sweden and Latvia to Spain, Italy and Greece and from Great Britain to Romania.

== Description ==
The wingspan is 11–13 millimetres (0.43–0.51 in). Adults are on wing in July.

The larvae feed on Thymus praecox, Thymus pulegioides and Thymus serpyllum. Full-grown larvae can be found in mid June.
