= Coleophora keireuki =

Scientific classification
- Kingdom: Animalia
- Phylum: Arthropoda
- Class: Insecta
- Order: Lepidoptera
- Family: Coleophoridae
- Genus: Coleophora
- Species: C. keireuki

Binomial name
- Coleophora keireuki Falkovitsh, 1970

Species of moth

Coleophora keireuki is a moth of the family Coleophoridae. It is found in Turkestan and Uzbekistan.

The larvae feed on the leaves of Caroxylon species, including Caroxylon orientalis. Larvae can be found from May to the beginning of October. There are at least two generations per year.
