= Coleophora obviella =

Scientific classification
- Kingdom: Animalia
- Phylum: Arthropoda
- Class: Insecta
- Order: Lepidoptera
- Family: Coleophoridae
- Genus: Coleophora
- Species: C. obviella

Binomial name
- Coleophora obviella Rebel, 1914

Synonyms
- Colephora auriculae Klimesch

Species of moth

Coleophora obviella is a moth of the family Coleophoridae. It is found from the Czech Republic to Italy and Albania.

The larvae feed on Leontopodium alpinum and Primula auricula. Larvae can be found from June to May.
