= Coleophora salviella =

Scientific classification
- Kingdom: Animalia
- Phylum: Arthropoda
- Class: Insecta
- Order: Lepidoptera
- Family: Coleophoridae
- Genus: Coleophora
- Species: C. salviella

Binomial name
- Coleophora salviella Chretien, 1916

Synonyms
- Coleophora pagmana Toll, 1962; Coleophora gomerella Falkovitsh, 1978

Species of moth

Coleophora salviella is a moth of the family Coleophoridae. It is found on the Canary Islands (Tenerife, La Gomera, Fuerteventura) and in Algeria, Turkmenistan, Afghanistan and Pakistan.
