= Coleophora elephantella =

Scientific classification
- Kingdom: Animalia
- Phylum: Arthropoda
- Class: Insecta
- Order: Lepidoptera
- Family: Coleophoridae
- Genus: Coleophora
- Species: C. elephantella

Binomial name
- Coleophora elephantella Falkovitsh, 1970

Species of moth

Coleophora elephantella is a moth of the family Coleophoridae. It is found in Turkestan and Uzbekistan.

The larvae feed on Caroxylon species, including Caroxylon orientalis.
