= Coleophora zhusguni =

Scientific classification
- Kingdom: Animalia
- Phylum: Arthropoda
- Class: Insecta
- Order: Lepidoptera
- Family: Coleophoridae
- Genus: Coleophora
- Species: C. zhusguni

Binomial name
- Coleophora zhusguni Falkovitsh, 1972

Species of insect

Coleophora zhusguni is a moth of the family Coleophoridae. It is found in southern Russia.

The larvae feed on Calligonum leucocladum. They mine the green branches of their host plant. The larvae can be found in the beginning of June and after hibernation from April to May.
