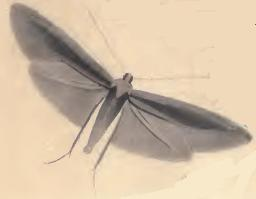

Scientific classification
- Kingdom: Animalia
- Phylum: Arthropoda
- Clade: Pancrustacea
- Class: Insecta
- Order: Lepidoptera
- Family: Coleophoridae
- Genus: Coleophora
- Species: C. ledi

Binomial name
- Coleophora ledi Stainton, 1860

= Coleophora ledi =

Species of moth

Coleophora ledi is a moth of the family Coleophoridae. It is found from Fennoscandia and northern Russia to the Pyrenees and the Alps. In the east, it ranges to Japan. Outside of Eurasia, it is known from North America where it is found in eastern Canada, Michigan, and Alaska.

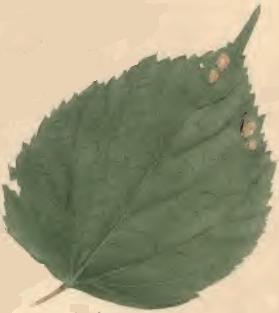
Mined Tilia leaf with attached larva-case

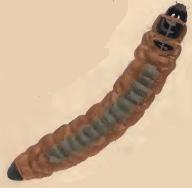
Larva

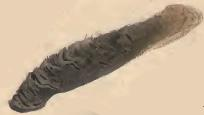
Larval case

The wingspan is 10–13 mm (0.39–0.51 in).

The larvae feed on Ledum palustre, Ledum groenlandicum and Chamaedaphne calyculata.
