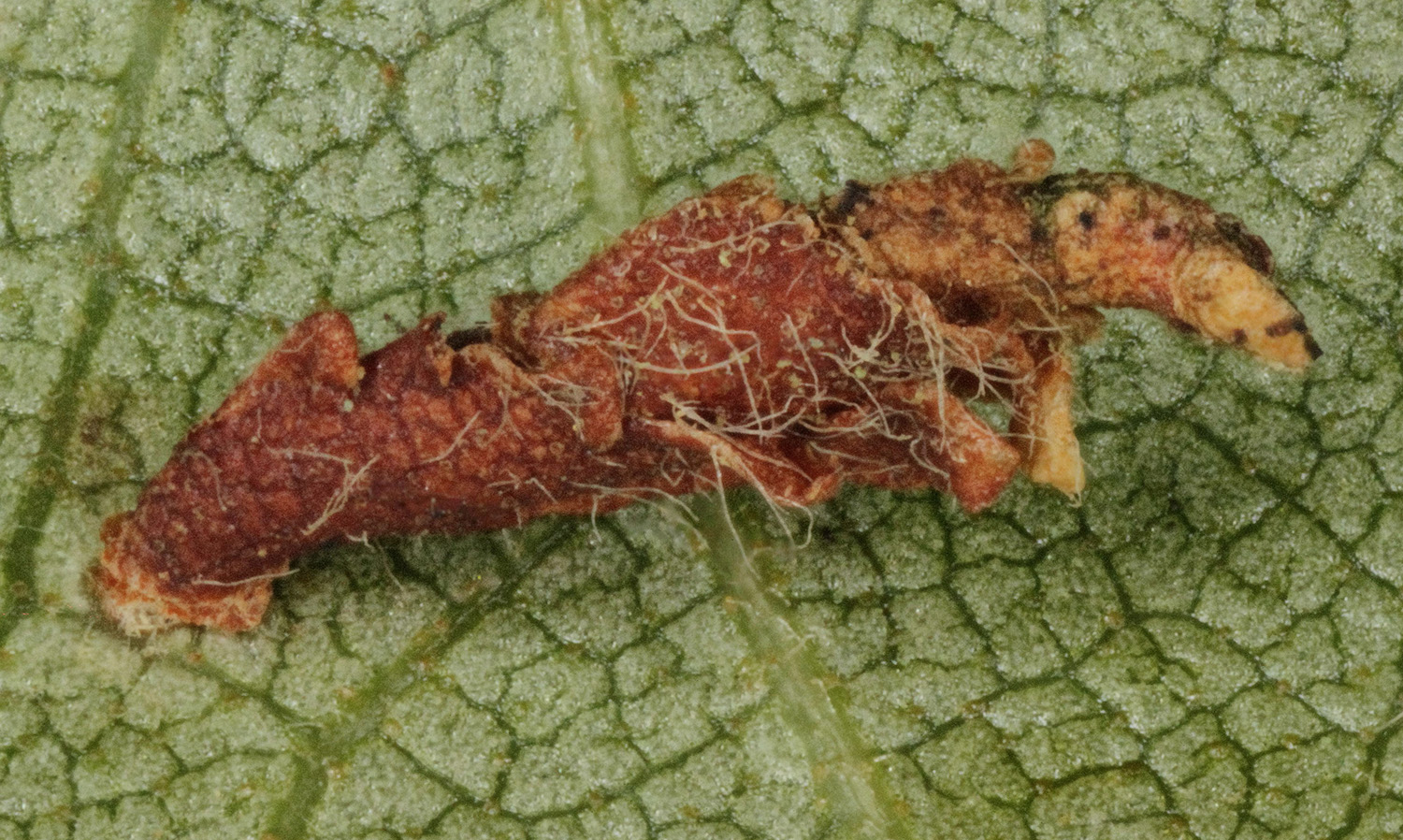
- Coleophora binderella, Gogarth bog, North Wales
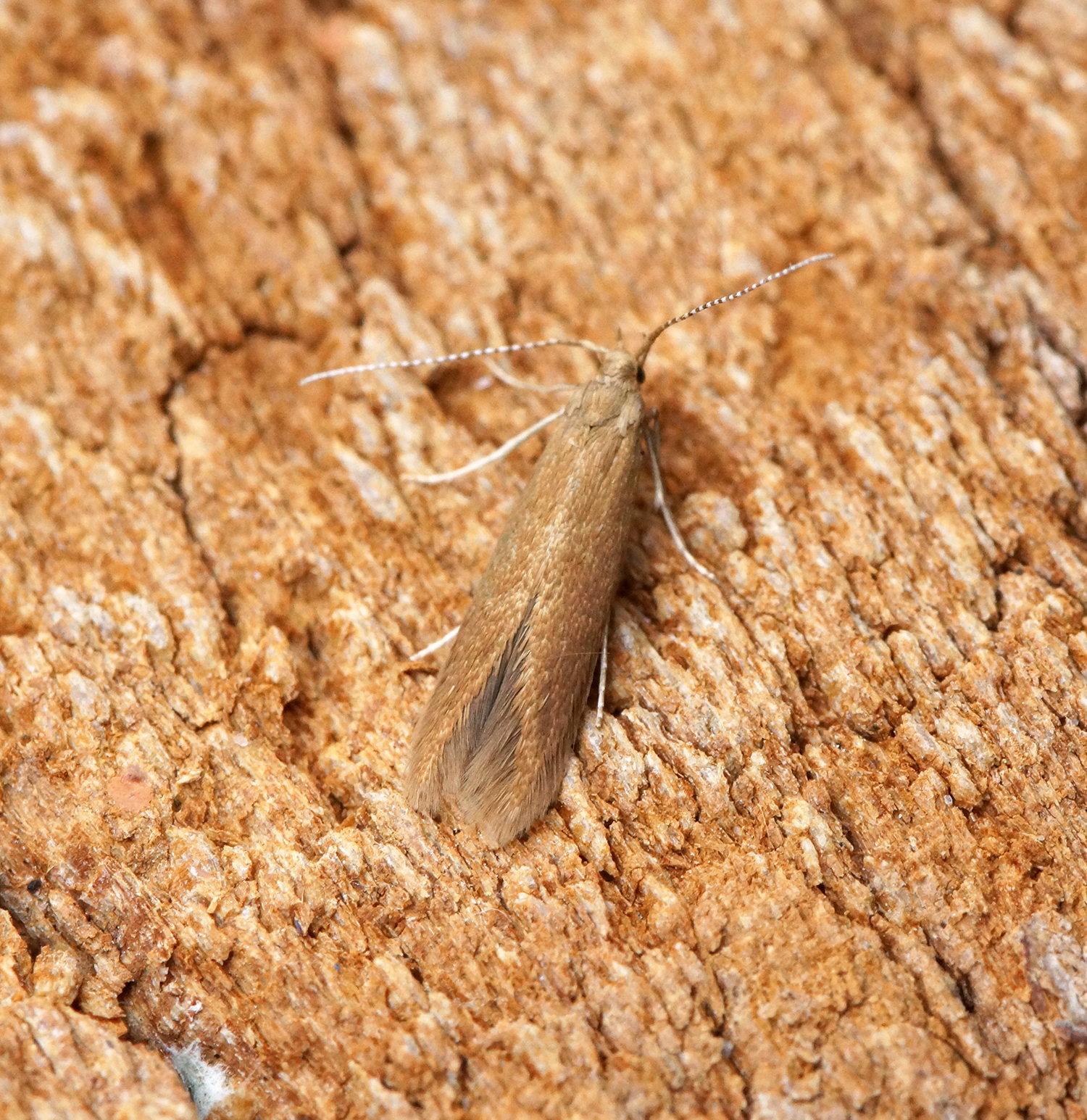
- imago

Scientific classification
- Kingdom: Animalia
- Phylum: Arthropoda
- Class: Insecta
- Order: Lepidoptera
- Family: Coleophoridae
- Genus: Coleophora
- Species: C. binderella

Binomial name
- Coleophora binderella (Kollar, 1832)

Synonyms
- Ornix binderella Kollar 1832; Coleophora bicolorella Stainton, 1861; Coleophora politella Scott, 1861

= Coleophora binderella =

Species of moth

Coleophora binderella is a moth of the family Coleophoridae. It is found from Scandinavia and Finland to the Iberian Peninsula and Italy, and from Ireland to the Baltic States and Romania.

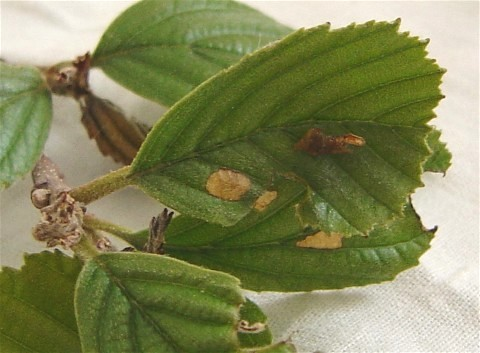
Black alder (Alnus glutinosa) with feeding damage (center) and case (center-right) of Coleophora binderella

The wingspan is 8–12 millimetres (0.31–0.47 in). Head deep shining ochreous. Antennae white, indistinctly ringed with fuscous, basal joint ochreous. Forewings deep shining ochreous, coppery tinged. Hindwings blackish.

Adults are on wing from late June to July.

The larvae feed on Alnus glutinosa, Alnus incana, Alnus viridis, Betula pubescens, Betula pendula, Carpinus betulus and Corylus avellana.
