= Coleophora asthenella =

Scientific classification
- Kingdom: Animalia
- Phylum: Arthropoda
- Class: Insecta
- Order: Lepidoptera
- Family: Coleophoridae
- Genus: Coleophora
- Species: C. asthenella

Binomial name
- Coleophora asthenella Constant, 1893

Species of moth

Coleophora asthenella is a moth of the family Coleophoridae. It is found in the western part of the Mediterranean region.

The larvae feed on Tamarix africana. They create a composite leaf case of 5–6 mm (0.20–0.24 in), made of mined leaves. Larvae can be found in May.
