= Coleophora marcella =

Scientific classification
- Kingdom: Animalia
- Phylum: Arthropoda
- Class: Insecta
- Order: Lepidoptera
- Family: Coleophoridae
- Genus: Coleophora
- Species: C. marcella

Binomial name
- Coleophora marcella (Capuse, 1972)

Synonyms
- Falkovitshia marcella Capuse, 1972

Species of moth

Coleophora marcella is a moth of the family Coleophoridae that is endemic to Uzbekistan.
