= Coleophora saponariella =

Scientific classification
- Kingdom: Animalia
- Phylum: Arthropoda
- Class: Insecta
- Order: Lepidoptera
- Family: Coleophoridae
- Genus: Coleophora
- Species: C. saponariella

Binomial name
- Coleophora saponariella Heeger, 1848

Species of moth

Coleophora saponariella is a moth of the family Coleophoridae. It is found from Sweden to Portugal and Italy and from France to Poland and Romania.

The wingspan is 8–10 mm (0.31–0.39 in). Larvae can be found from September to May.
