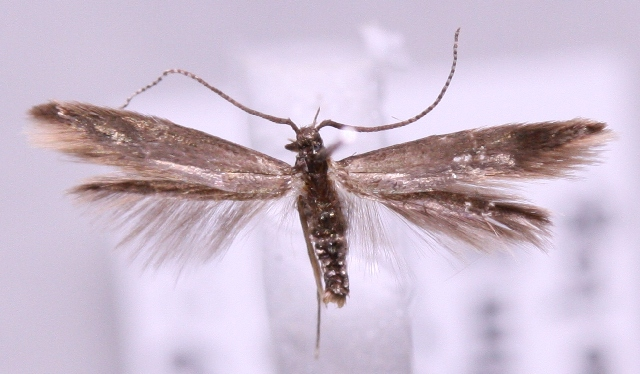

Scientific classification
- Kingdom: Animalia
- Phylum: Arthropoda
- Class: Insecta
- Order: Lepidoptera
- Family: Coleophoridae
- Genus: Coleophora
- Species: C. fuscocuprella

Binomial name
- Coleophora fuscocuprella Herrich-Schaffer, 1855

= Coleophora fuscocuprella =

Species of moth

Coleophora fuscocuprella is a moth of the family Coleophoridae. It is found from Fennoscandia to the Pyrenees, Italy, Albania and Romania and from Ireland to Russia.

The wingspan is 8–10 mm (0.31–0.39 in). The head is shining dark bronzy-fuscous, and the antennae are dark fuscous; apical half white with dark fuscous rings, indistinct towards apex. The forewings are dark bronzy-fuscous, and the hindwings are dark grey.

There is one generation per year with adults on wing from mid-May to late June.

The larvae feed on alder (Alnus species), silver birch (Betula pendula), downy birch (Betula pubescens), European hornbeam (Carpinus betulus) and hazel (Corylus avellana).
