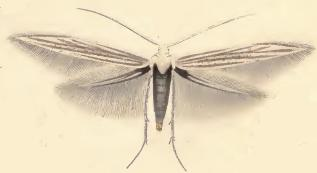

Scientific classification
- Kingdom: Animalia
- Phylum: Arthropoda
- Clade: Pancrustacea
- Class: Insecta
- Order: Lepidoptera
- Family: Coleophoridae
- Genus: Coleophora
- Species: C. millefolii

Binomial name
- Coleophora millefolii Zeller, 1849

= Coleophora millefolii =

Species of moth

Coleophora millefolii is a moth of the family Coleophoridae. It is found in most of Europe, except Great Britain, Ireland and the Iberian Peninsula.

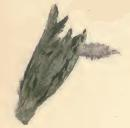
Sprig of Achillea millefolium with larva-case attached

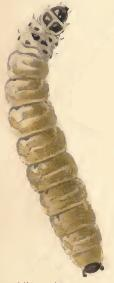
Larva

The wingspan is 11–12 mm (0.43–0.47 in). Adults are on wing from the end of June to August.
