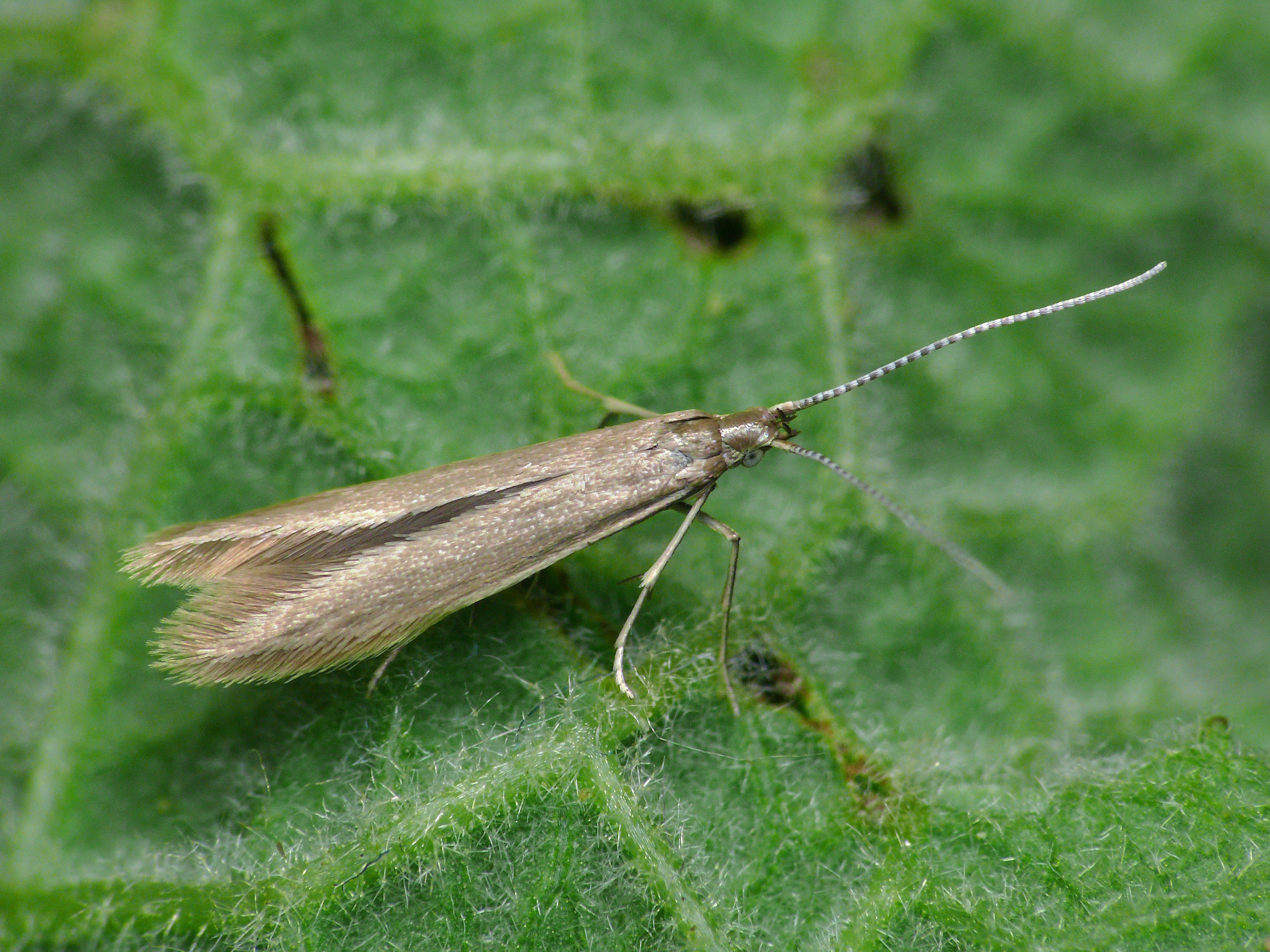
- Adult

Scientific classification
- Domain: Eukaryota
- Kingdom: Animalia
- Phylum: Arthropoda
- Class: Insecta
- Order: Lepidoptera
- Family: Coleophoridae
- Genus: Coleophora
- Species: C. caespititiella

Binomial name
- Coleophora caespititiella Zeller, 1839

Synonyms
- List: Ornix lacunaecolella (Duponchel, 1844); Coleophora lacunicolella (Zeller, 1849); Coleophora agrammella (Wood, 1892); Coleophora caespitiella (lapsus)

= Coleophora caespititiella =

Species of moth

Coleophora caespititiella is a moth of the family Coleophoridae. This species is found throughout the United Kingdom and most of Europe. It is also known from North America. The Coleophoridae group are often collectively known as the case moths or case-bearers.

== Description ==
The larvae feed on rushes (Juncus species), producing spun silken pupal cases within which they overwinter on the seed heads. The adults are small and brown with pointed wings. Head light greyish-ochreous. Antennae white, ringed with fuscous anteriorly except towards apex. Forewings greyish-ochreous, sometimes whitish-sprinkled, rather shining; costa distinctly white from base to 2/3 shading into cilia posteriorly; rarely somewhat darker streaks between veins towards costa. Hindwings grey.

== Gallery ==
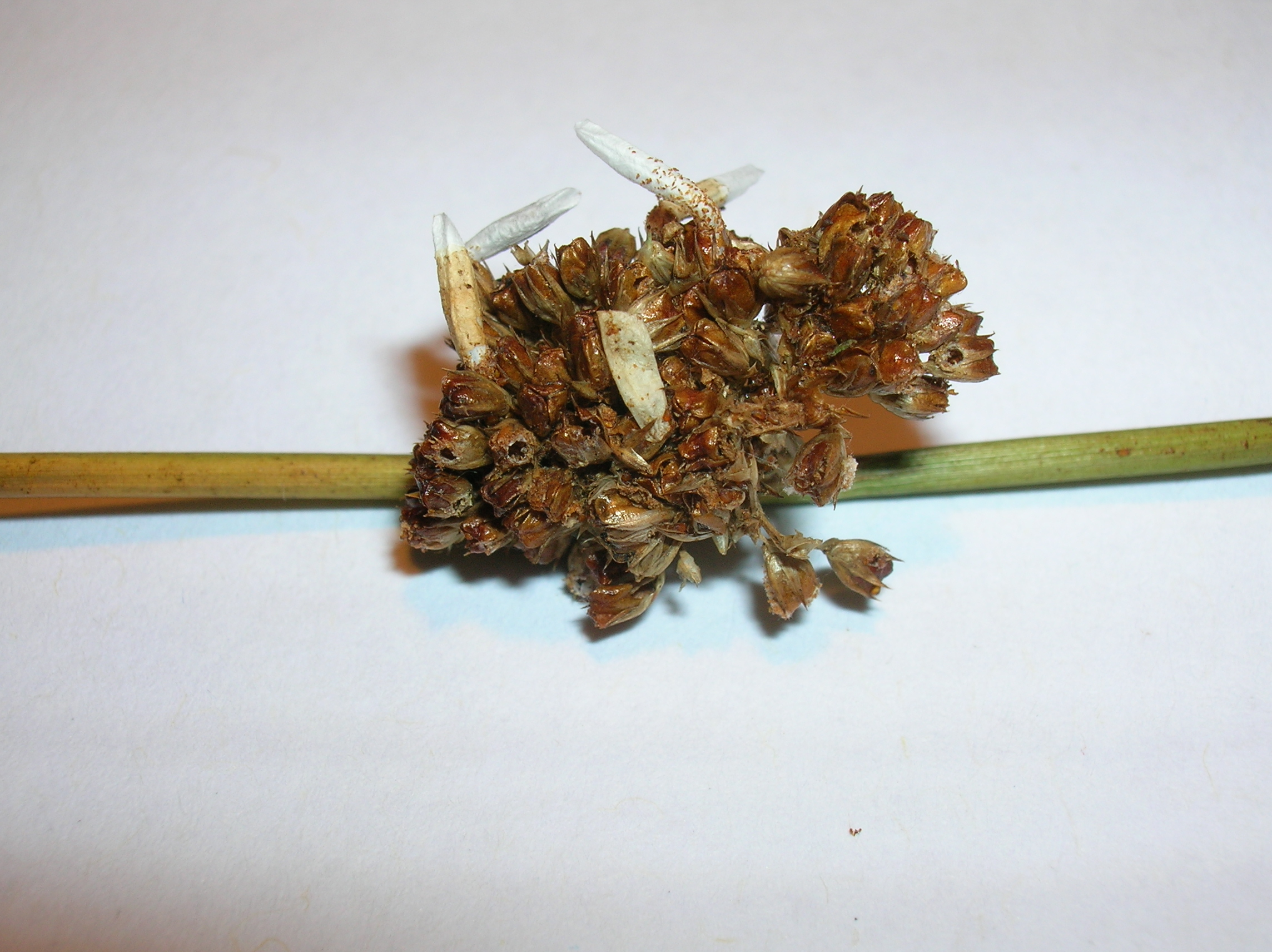
Pupal cases, showing feeding, not galling behaviour

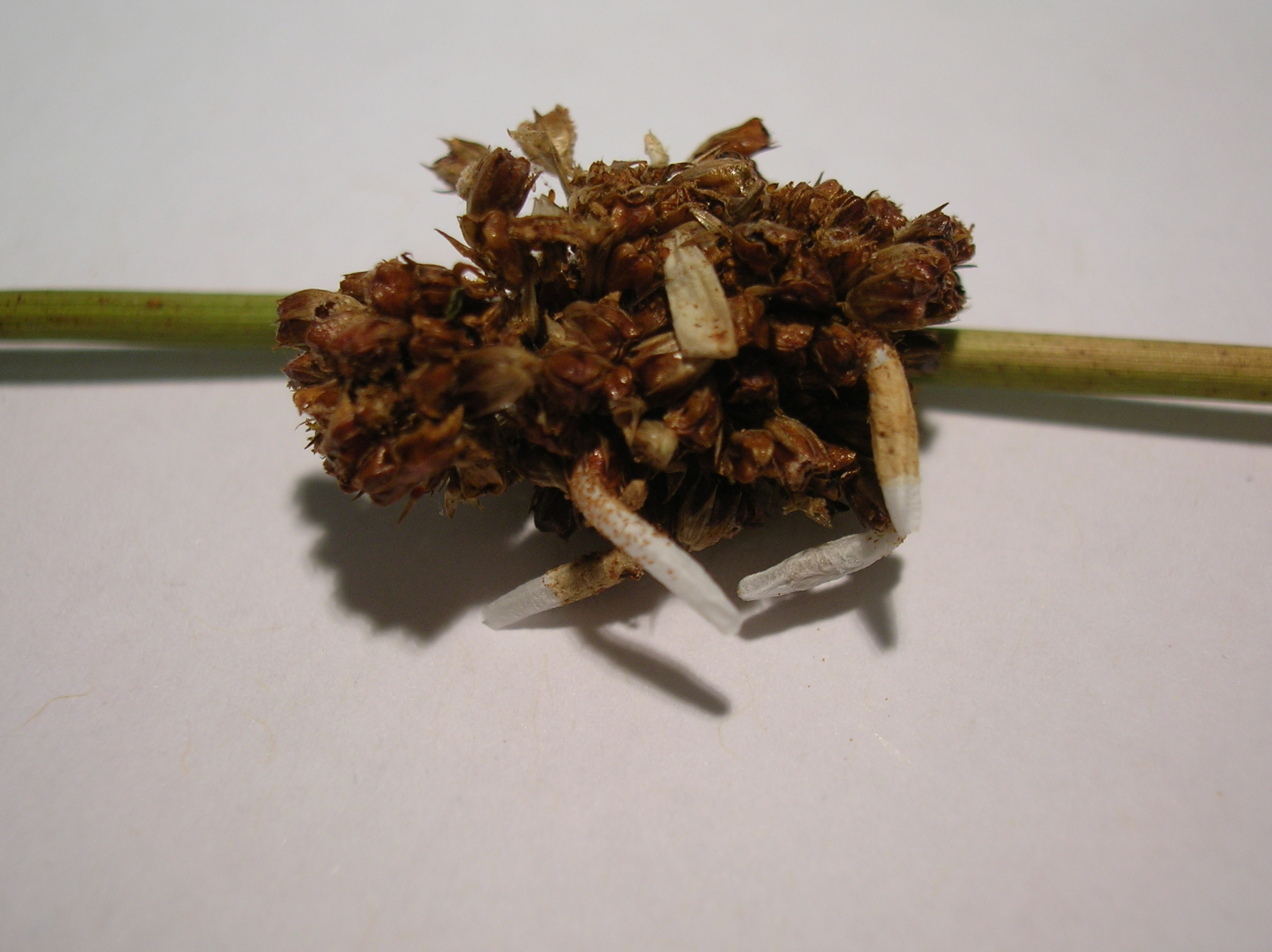
Pupal cases on Juncus flower heads

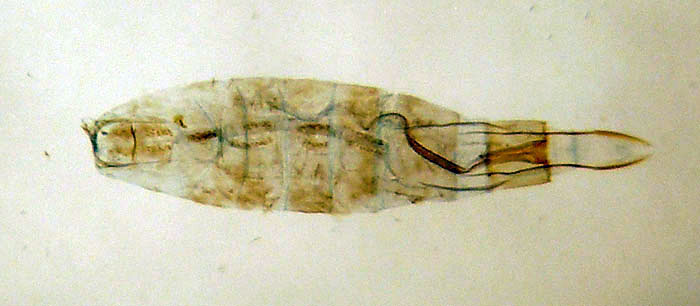

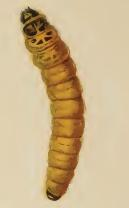
Larva

== See also ==
- Juncus effusus
