= Coleophora stegosaurus =

Scientific classification
- Kingdom: Animalia
- Phylum: Arthropoda
- Class: Insecta
- Order: Lepidoptera
- Family: Coleophoridae
- Genus: Coleophora
- Species: C. stegosaurus

Binomial name
- Coleophora stegosaurus Falkovitsh, 1972

Species of moth

Coleophora stegosaurus is a moth of the family Coleophoridae. It is found in Uzbekistan.

The larvae feed on Lycium ruthenicum. Larvae can be found from the end of May to October.
