= Coleophora fergana =

Scientific classification
- Kingdom: Animalia
- Phylum: Arthropoda
- Class: Insecta
- Order: Lepidoptera
- Family: Coleophoridae
- Genus: Coleophora
- Species: C. fergana

Binomial name
- Coleophora fergana Toll, 1961

Species of moth

Coleophora fergana is a moth of the family Coleophoridae. It is found in Transoxiana, a portion of Central Asia.
