= Coleophora paradoxella =

Scientific classification
- Kingdom: Animalia
- Phylum: Arthropoda
- Class: Insecta
- Order: Lepidoptera
- Family: Coleophoridae
- Genus: Coleophora
- Species: C. paradoxella

Binomial name
- Coleophora paradoxella Toll, 1961

Species of moth

Coleophora paradoxella is a moth of the family Coleophoridae. It is found in southern Russia and China.
