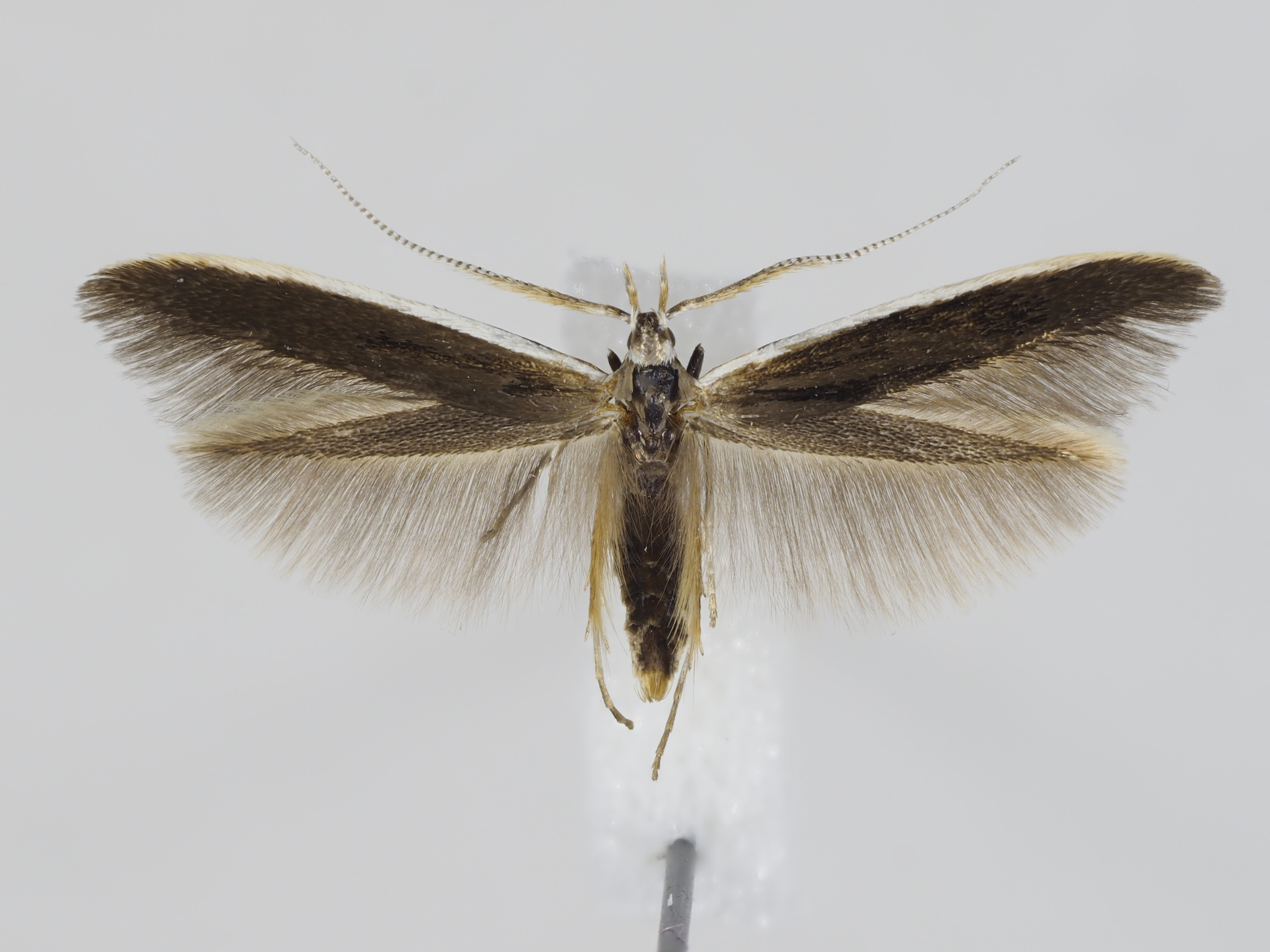

Scientific classification
- Kingdom: Animalia
- Phylum: Arthropoda
- Clade: Pancrustacea
- Class: Insecta
- Order: Lepidoptera
- Family: Coleophoridae
- Genus: Coleophora
- Species: C. albella

Binomial name
- Coleophora albella (Thunberg, 1788)

Synonyms
- Tinea albella Thunberg, 1788; Tinea leucapennella Hubner, 1827

= Coleophora albella =

Species of moth

Coleophora albella is a moth of the family Coleophoridae. It is found in most of Europe.

The wingspan is 16–18 millimetres (0.63–0.71 in). Adults are on wing from May to June.

The larvae feed on Silene nutans and Silene vulgaris.

== Status ==
The species is considered to be endangered in Great Britain, and can be found only in one location in Avon.
