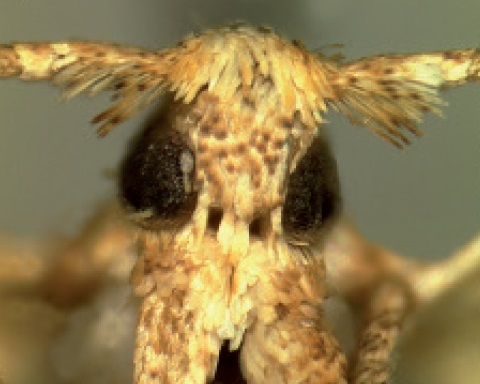
- Head

Scientific classification
- Kingdom: Animalia
- Phylum: Arthropoda
- Class: Insecta
- Order: Lepidoptera
- Family: Coleophoridae
- Genus: Coleophora
- Species: C. micronotella

Binomial name
- Coleophora micronotella Toll, 1956

= Coleophora micronotella =

Species of moth

Coleophora micronotella is a moth of the family Coleophoridae. It is found in Tunisia, Spain, Sardinia, Italy and Sicily. It has also been recorded from Kazakhstan and Tajikistan. A record from Iran is based on a misidentification.

The larvae feed on Halocnemum strobilaceum and Halostachys caspica. They feed on the assimilation shoots of their host plant. They feed as a borer, without making a case.
