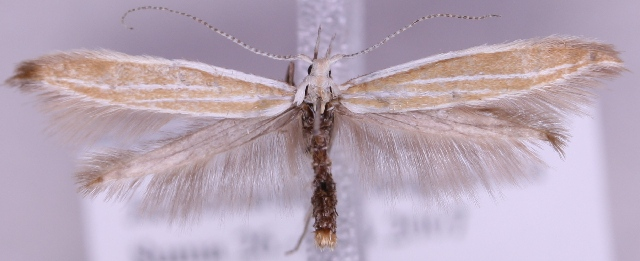

Scientific classification
- Kingdom: Animalia
- Phylum: Arthropoda
- Class: Insecta
- Order: Lepidoptera
- Family: Coleophoridae
- Genus: Coleophora
- Species: C. fringillella

Binomial name
- Coleophora fringillella Zeller, 1839

= Coleophora fringillella =

Species of moth

Coleophora fringillella is a moth of the family Coleophoridae. It is found in France, Italy, Austria, Hungary, Romania and Asia Minor.
