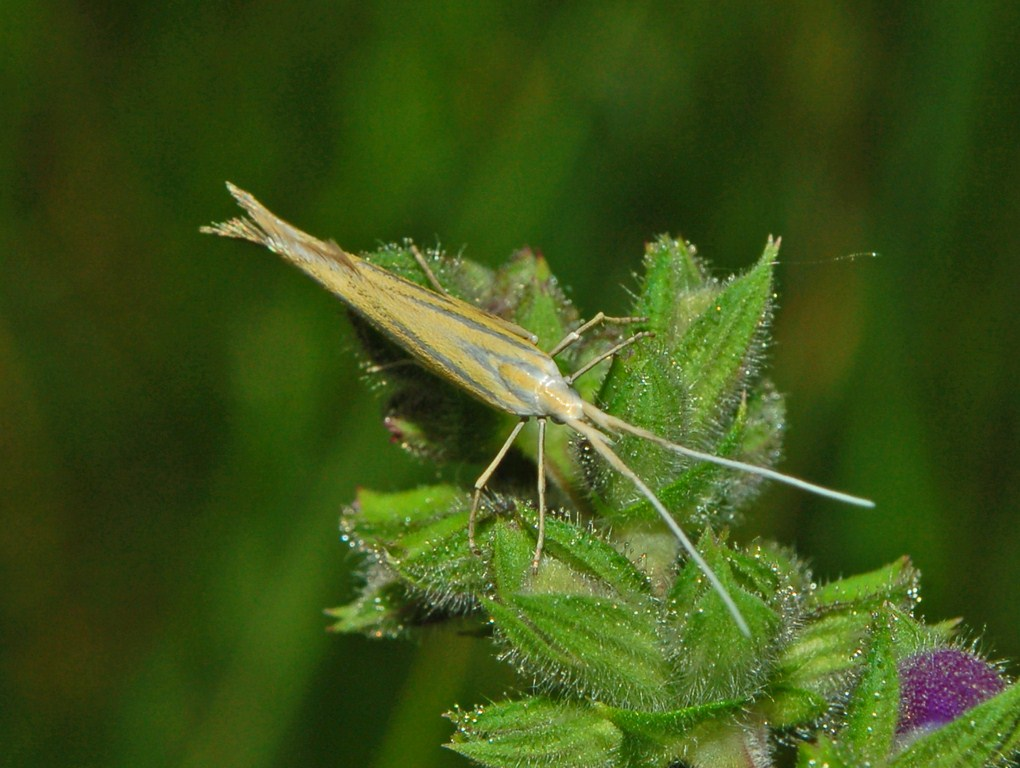
- Dorsal view
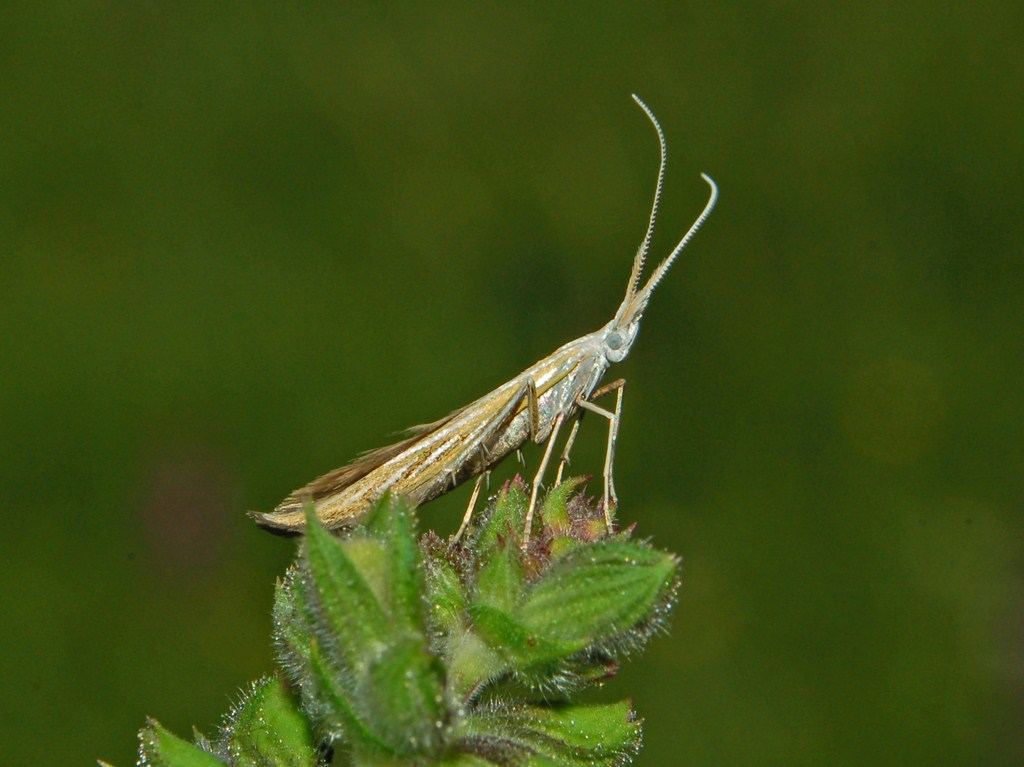
- Lateral view

Scientific classification
- Kingdom: Animalia
- Phylum: Arthropoda
- Class: Insecta
- Order: Lepidoptera
- Family: Coleophoridae
- Genus: Coleophora
- Species: C. ornatipennella

Binomial name
- Coleophora ornatipennella (Hübner, 1796)

Synonyms
- Tinea ornatipennella Hübner, 1796; Porrectaria ornatea Haworth, 1828

= Coleophora ornatipennella =

Species of moth

Coleophora ornatipennella is a small moth of the family Coleophoridae.

== Distribution ==
It is found in central and south-eastern Europe (from Germany and Poland to the Pyrenees, Italy and Greece and from France to Romania as well as in southern and northern Russia and Estonia) and in the Near East. It is also found in China.

== Description ==
The wingspan is about 12 millimetres (0.47 in). Forewings are yellowish and apically falcate, with dark gray stripes.

== Behavior ==
The moth flies in May and June depending on the location. The larvae feed on Alopecurus, Anthoxanthum, Avena, Briza, Bromus, Dactylis glomerata, Holcus, Koeleria and Poa species. Larvae can be found from October to May.

== Gallery ==
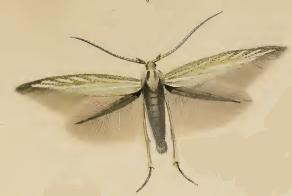
Coleophora ornatipennella. Illustration from Stainton's Natural History of the Tineina (1859)

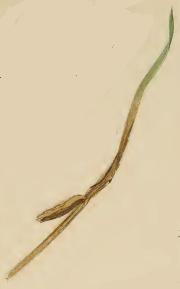
Mined grass leaf blade with larval case attached

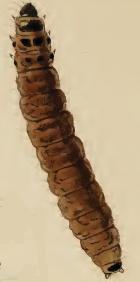
Larva
