= Coleophora falcigerella =

Scientific classification
- Kingdom: Animalia
- Phylum: Arthropoda
- Class: Insecta
- Order: Lepidoptera
- Family: Coleophoridae
- Genus: Coleophora
- Species: C. falcigerella

Binomial name
- Coleophora falcigerella Christoph, 1872

Species of moth

Coleophora falcigerella is a moth of the family Coleophoridae. It is found in southern Russia.

The larvae feed on the leaves of Glycyrrhiza glabra.
