= Coleophora oriolella =

Scientific classification
- Kingdom: Animalia
- Phylum: Arthropoda
- Clade: Pancrustacea
- Class: Insecta
- Order: Lepidoptera
- Family: Coleophoridae
- Genus: Coleophora
- Species: C. oriolella

Binomial name
- Coleophora oriolella Zeller, 1849

Synonyms
- Coleophora mongetella Chrétien, 1900; Coleophora siliquella Constant, 1893; Coleophora hafneri Prohaska, 1923

Species of moth

Coleophora oriolella is a moth of the family Coleophoridae. It is found in Germany and Poland to the Iberian Peninsula, Sardinia, Sicily and Greece and from France to southern Russia.

The larvae feed on Coronilla, Dorycnium pentaphyllum and Dorycnium pentaphyllum germanicum. They create a seed case. Larvae can be found from autumn to May.
