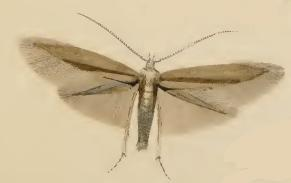

Scientific classification
- Kingdom: Animalia
- Phylum: Arthropoda
- Class: Insecta
- Order: Lepidoptera
- Family: Coleophoridae
- Genus: Coleophora
- Species: C. siccifolia

Binomial name
- Coleophora siccifolia Stainton, 1856

= Coleophora siccifolia =

Species of moth

Coleophora siccifolia is a moth of the family Coleophoridae. It is found in most of Europe.

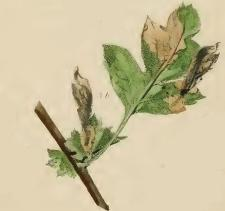
Hawthorn leaves eaten by the larva, with two cases attached

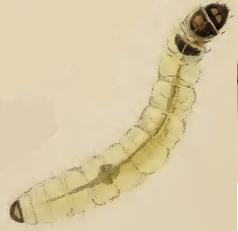
Larva

The wingspan is 10–12 mm (0.39–0.47 in). Coleophora species have narrow blunt to pointed forewings and a weakly defined tornus. The hindwings are narrow-elongate and very long-fringed. The upper surfaces have neither a discal spot nor transverse lines. Each abdomen segment of the abdomen has paired patches of tiny spines which show through the scales. The resting position is horizontal with the front end raised and the cilia give the hind tip a frayed and upturned look if the wings are rolled around the body. C. siccifolia characteristics include head light greyish-ochreous. Antennae white, ringed with fuscous, basal joint pale greyish-ochreous. Posterior tarsi grey-whitish. Forewings brownish-grey, somewhat shining. Hindwings rather dark grey.

The larvae feed on Alnus, Betula lutea, Betula pubescens, Carpinus betulus, Crataegus laevigata, Malus domestica, Sorbus aucuparia and Tilia species. Full-grown larvae can be found in August in Great Britain and in October in continental Europe.
