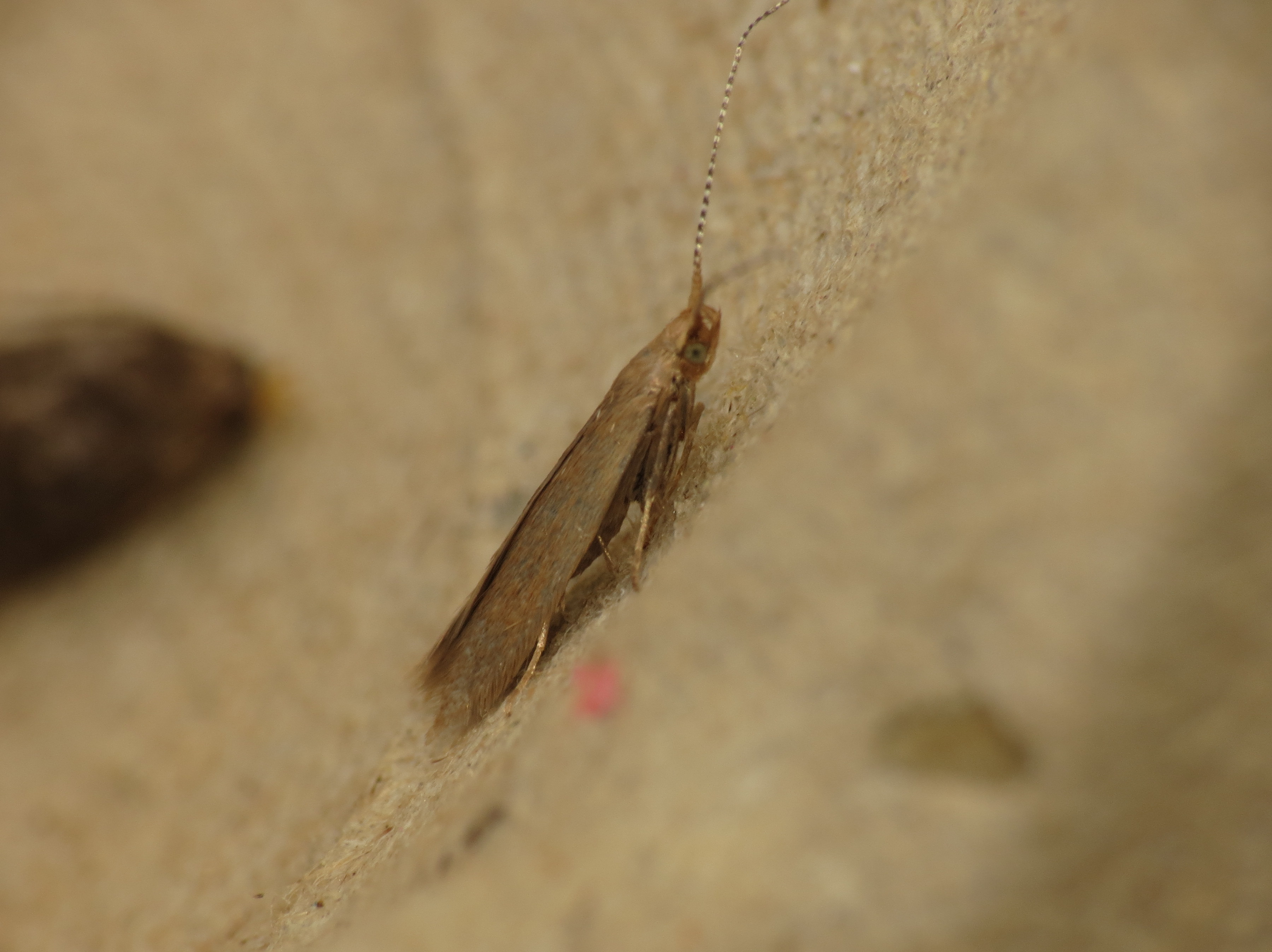

Scientific classification
- Kingdom: Animalia
- Phylum: Arthropoda
- Class: Insecta
- Order: Lepidoptera
- Family: Coleophoridae
- Genus: Coleophora
- Species: C. flavipennella

Binomial name
- Coleophora flavipennella (Duponchel, 1843)

Synonyms
- Ornix flavipennella Duponchel, 1843

= Coleophora flavipennella =

Species of moth

Coleophora flavipennella is a moth of the family Coleophoridae. It was described by Philogène Auguste Joseph Duponchel in 1843 and is found in most Europe, besides the Mediterranean region.

== Description ==
The wingspan is 11–13 mm (0.43–0.51 in). C. flavipennella varies in colour from ochreous to ochreous-brown to ochreous-greyish. There is often an indistinct lighter costal area, a shade lighter than ground colour. The antennae are white, or alternately ringed black or brown and white to the tip. Note that many species in the Coleophora genus look very similar. Identification is by microscopic examination of the genitalia.

== Diet ==
The larvae feed on sweet chestnut (Castanea sativa), sessile oak (Quercus petraea), pedunculate oak (Quercus robur) and northern red oak (Quercus rubra). The caterpillar has a characteristic way of feeding, creating small holes in the leaves of the host plant.

== Life Cycle ==
The life cycle of a C. flavipennella begins with the egg stage, when eggs are placed on host plants. Upon hatching, the larvae construct protective cases around themselves using silk and fragments of plant material. The larval stage of C. flavipennella is the longest phase of its life cycle, lasting several weeks to months, depending on environmental conditions and host plant availability. The case is replaced as the larva grows. Once completely developed, the larvae pupate within their casings and undergo metamorphosis before emerging as adult moths.
