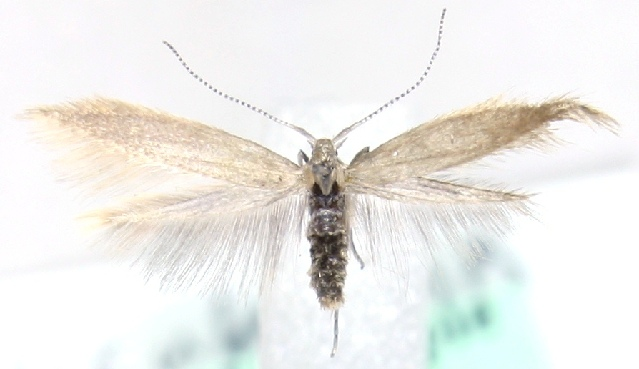

Scientific classification
- Kingdom: Animalia
- Phylum: Arthropoda
- Class: Insecta
- Order: Lepidoptera
- Family: Coleophoridae
- Genus: Coleophora
- Species: C. cornutella

Binomial name
- Coleophora cornutella Herrich-Schaffer, 1861

Synonyms
- Coleophora cornuta Heinemann & Wocke, 1876

= Coleophora cornutella =

Species of moth

Coleophora cornutella is a moth of the family Coleophoridae. It is found from Fennoscandia to the Pyrenees and the Alps and from France to Romania.

The wingspan is 9–10 mm (0.35–0.39 in).

The larvae feed on Betula pubescens. Larvae can be found from September to May.
