= Coleophora attalicella =

Scientific classification
- Kingdom: Animalia
- Phylum: Arthropoda
- Clade: Pancrustacea
- Class: Insecta
- Order: Lepidoptera
- Family: Coleophoridae
- Genus: Coleophora
- Species: C. attalicella

Binomial name
- Coleophora attalicella Zeller, 1871

Synonyms
- Ecebalia attalicella; Coleophora unistriella Caradja, 1920

Species of moth

Coleophora attalicella is a moth of the family Coleophoridae. It is found in the lower Volga region and Ural region of Russia and Afghanistan.

Adults are on wing in June.
