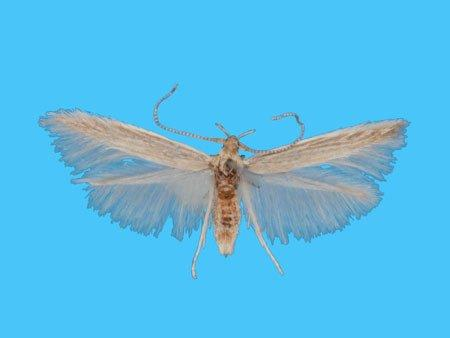

Scientific classification
- Kingdom: Animalia
- Phylum: Arthropoda
- Class: Insecta
- Order: Lepidoptera
- Family: Coleophoridae
- Genus: Coleophora
- Species: C. lassella

Binomial name
- Coleophora lassella Staudinger, 1859

Synonyms
- Coleophora telavivella Toll, 1942

= Coleophora lassella =

Species of moth

Coleophora lassella is a moth of the family Coleophoridae found in Europe.

== Description ==
The wingspan is 10–12 mm (0.39–0.47 in). It closely resembles several other Coleophora and impossible to identify without microscopic examination of the genitalia.

There are possibly two generations per year in western Europe, with adults on wing from late May to June and again in mid-August.

The larvae feed on toad rush (Juncus bufonius).

== Distribution ==
The moth is widespread in Europe including Belgium, the Canary Islands, Corsica, Crete, Cyprus, Denmark, Finland, France, Germany, Great Britain, Greece, Ireland, Italy, Latvia, Norway, Poland, Portugal, southern Russia, Sardinia, Sicily, Spain, Sweden and the Netherlands.
