= Coleophora byrsostola =

Scientific classification
- Kingdom: Animalia
- Phylum: Arthropoda
- Class: Insecta
- Order: Lepidoptera
- Family: Coleophoridae
- Genus: Coleophora
- Species: C. byrsostola

Binomial name
- Coleophora byrsostola (Meyrick, 1931)

Synonyms
- Macrocorystis byrsostola (Meyrick, 1931)

Species of moth

Coleophora byrsostola is a moth of the family Coleophoridae. It is found in western and south-western India (Mahableshwar in Maharashtra and Kodagu district in Karnataka.

The wingspan is 8–9 mm (0.31–0.35 in).

The larvae feed on Strobilanthes species. They mine the leaves of their host plant.
