= Coleophora rhanteriella =

Scientific classification
- Kingdom: Animalia
- Phylum: Arthropoda
- Class: Insecta
- Order: Lepidoptera
- Family: Coleophoridae
- Genus: Coleophora
- Species: C. rhanteriella

Binomial name
- Coleophora rhanteriella Chrétien, 1915

Synonyms
- Coleophora excellens Toll, 1952; Coleophora semistriatella Toll, 1962; Coleophora subexcellens Toll, 1962

Species of moth

Coleophora rhanteriella is a moth of the family Coleophoridae. It is found in Algeria, Libya and Tunisia.

The larvae feed on Rhanterium abpressum. They feed on the leaves of their host plant.
