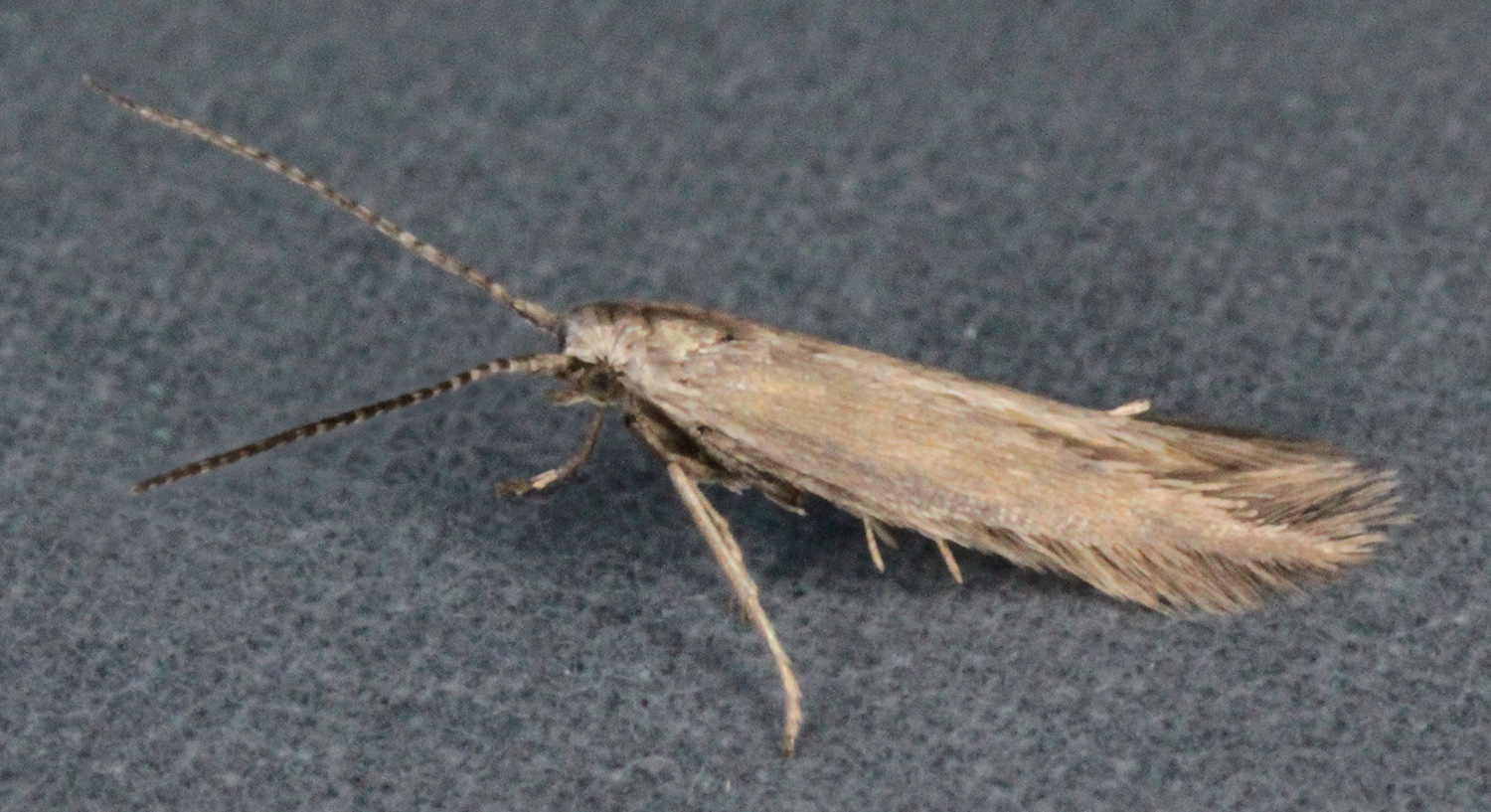
- Coleophora juncicolella, Trevor Quarry, North Wales
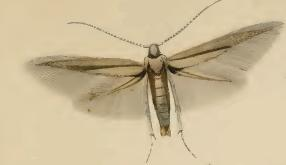

Scientific classification
- Kingdom: Animalia
- Phylum: Arthropoda
- Class: Insecta
- Order: Lepidoptera
- Family: Coleophoridae
- Genus: Coleophora
- Species: C. juncicolella

Binomial name
- Coleophora juncicolella Stainton, 1851

= Coleophora juncicolella =

Species of moth

Coleophora juncicolella is a moth of the family Coleophoridae. It is found from Fennoscandia to the Mediterranean Sea and from Ireland to Poland and Hungary.

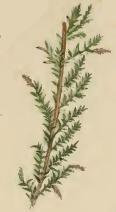
Sprig of Erica with mined leaves

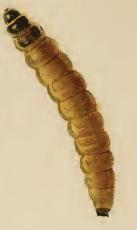
Larva

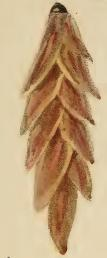
Larval case

== Description ==
The wingspan is 6–8 mm (0.24–0.31 in). Adults are grey-white. The head is ochreous-grey. The antennae grey-whitish, ringed with dark grey. Forewings shining grey, ochreous-tinged. Hindwings are grey.

They are on wing from late June to July in western Europe.

The larvae feed on common heather (Calluna vulgaris) and bell heather (Erica cinerea). Full-grown larvae can be found from March to May.
