= Coleophora campella =

Scientific classification
- Kingdom: Animalia
- Phylum: Arthropoda
- Class: Insecta
- Order: Lepidoptera
- Family: Coleophoridae
- Genus: Coleophora
- Species: C. campella

Binomial name
- Coleophora campella Falkovitsh, 1973

Species of moth

Coleophora campella is a moth of the family Coleophoridae. It is found in Turkestan and Uzbekistan.

The wingspan is about 8 mm (0.31 in).

The larvae feed on Salsola gemmascens. They reach a length of 4 mm (0.16 in). The larvae can be found from the end of September to October.
