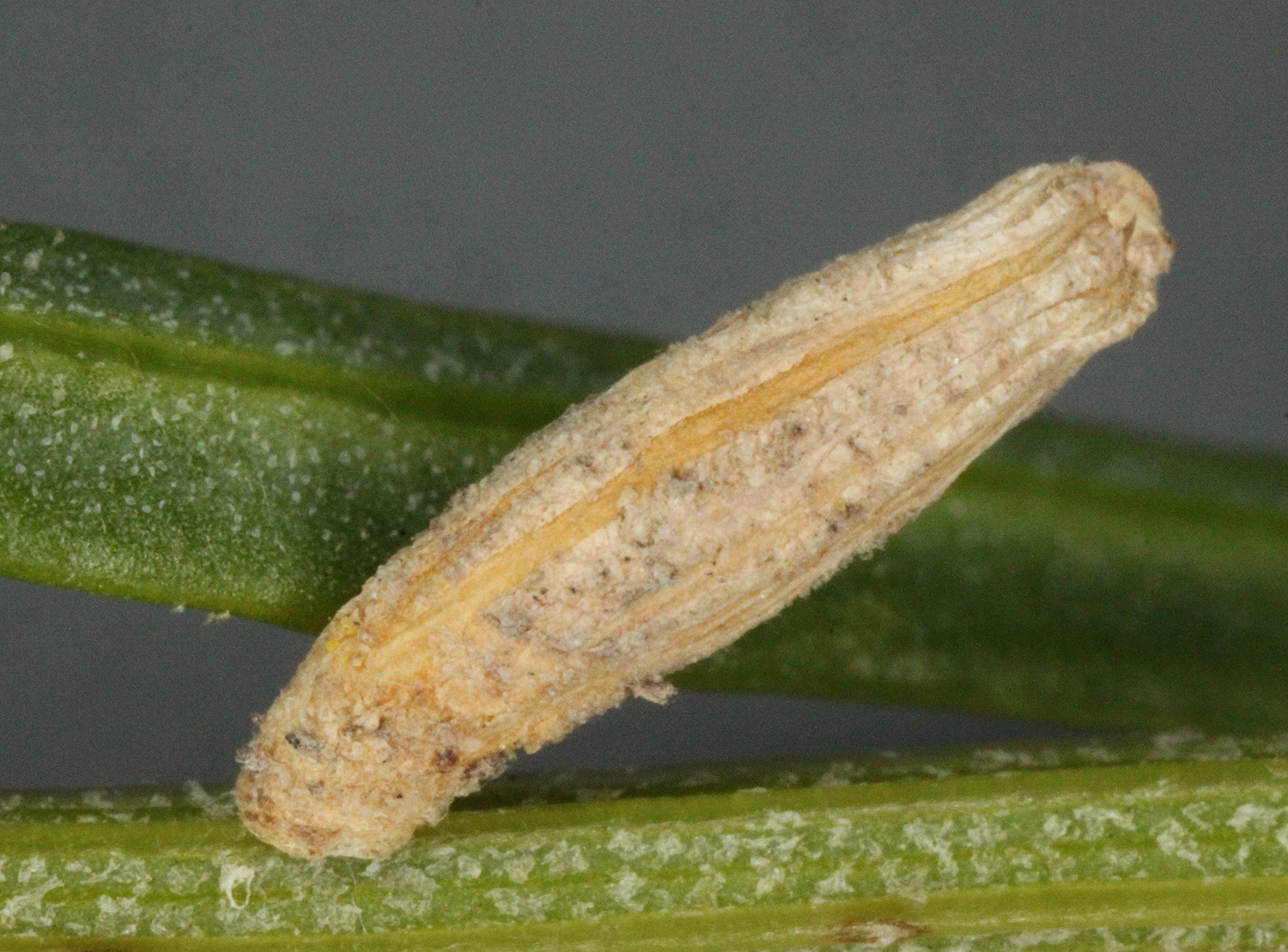
- larva in case

Scientific classification
- Kingdom: Animalia
- Phylum: Arthropoda
- Class: Insecta
- Order: Lepidoptera
- Family: Coleophoridae
- Genus: Coleophora
- Species: C. adspersella

Binomial name
- Coleophora adspersella Benander, 1939

= Coleophora adspersella =

Species of moth

Coleophora adspersella is a moth of the family Coleophoridae. It is found in most of Europe, except the Iberian Peninsula, Switzerland and Slovenia. It is also found in China. It occurs in forest and forest steppe biotopes, and in anthropogenic landscapes where the food plant occurs.

The wingspan is 13–16 mm (0.51–0.63 in). Coleophora species have narrow blunt to pointed forewings and a weakly defined tornus. The hindwings are narrow-elongate and very long-fringed. The upper surfaces have neither a discal spot nor transverse lines. Each abdomen segment of the abdomen has paired patches of tiny spines which show through the scales. The resting position is horizontal with the front end raised and the cilia give the hind tip a frayed and upturned look if the wings are rolled around the body.

They are on wing from June to August.

The larvae feed on Atriplex and Chenopodium species. They feed on the seeds and later form a ribbed case in which they hibernate.
