= Coleophora phlomidella =

Scientific classification
- Kingdom: Animalia
- Phylum: Arthropoda
- Class: Insecta
- Order: Lepidoptera
- Family: Coleophoridae
- Genus: Coleophora
- Species: C. phlomidella

Binomial name
- Coleophora phlomidella Christoph, 1862

Species of moth

Coleophora phlomidella is a moth of the family Coleophoridae. It is found in southern Russia and central Asia.

The larvae feed on the leaves of Phlomis pungens and Phlomis kopetdaghensis. Larvae can be found from autumn to June.
