= Coleophora sternipennella =

Scientific classification
- Kingdom: Animalia
- Phylum: Arthropoda
- Class: Insecta
- Order: Lepidoptera
- Family: Coleophoridae
- Genus: Coleophora
- Species: C. sternipennella

Binomial name
- Coleophora sternipennella (Zetterstedt, 1839)

Synonyms
- List: Ornix sternipennella Zetterstedt, 1839; Coleophora flavaginella Lienig & Zeller, 1846; Coleophora punctipennella Nylander, 1848; Coleophora albisquamella Herrich-Schäffer, 1854; Coleophora muehligiella Stainton, 1887; Coleophora moeniacella Stainton, 1887 (Unjustified replacement name for Coleophora muehligella Wocke, 1876); Coleophora niveistrigella Wocke, 1876

Species of moth

Coleophora sternipennella is a moth of the family Coleophoridae. It is found in all of Europe, except Greece and the Mediterranean islands. It is also known from the Caucasus. It occurs in steppe and desert biotopes, in wasteland and uncultivated parts of anthropogenic areas.

The wingspan is about 13 mm (0.51 in). Adult are on wing from July to August in western Europe.

The larvae feed on Atriplex and Chenopodium species creating a tubular silken case which is 6–8 mm (0.24–0.31 in) long. Larvae can be found from September. They overwinter as a larva before pupating in June.
