= Coleophora univittella =

Scientific classification
- Kingdom: Animalia
- Phylum: Arthropoda
- Class: Insecta
- Order: Lepidoptera
- Family: Coleophoridae
- Genus: Coleophora
- Species: C. univittella

Binomial name
- Coleophora univittella Staudinger, 1880

Species of moth

Coleophora univittella is a moth of the family Coleophoridae. It is found in Ukraine.
