= Coleophora solidaginella =

Scientific classification
- Kingdom: Animalia
- Phylum: Arthropoda
- Class: Insecta
- Order: Lepidoptera
- Family: Coleophoridae
- Genus: Coleophora
- Species: C. solidaginella

Binomial name
- Coleophora solidaginella Staudinger, 1859

Synonyms
- Coleophora xenia Hering, 1937; Coleophora conyzae xenia

Species of moth

Coleophora solidaginella is a moth of the family Coleophoridae. It is found in Spain and Portugal.
