= Coleophora captiosa =

Scientific classification
- Kingdom: Animalia
- Phylum: Arthropoda
- Class: Insecta
- Order: Lepidoptera
- Family: Coleophoridae
- Genus: Coleophora
- Species: C. captiosa

Binomial name
- Coleophora captiosa Falkovitsh, 1972

Species of moth

Coleophora captiosa is a moth of the family Coleophoridae. It is found in Turkestan and Mongolia.

The larvae feed on Haloxylon aphyllum. Larvae can be found from September to October.

== Subspecies ==
- Coleophora captiosa captiosa
- Coleophora captiosa maior Baldizzone, 1994
