= Coleophora fretella =

Scientific classification
- Kingdom: Animalia
- Phylum: Arthropoda
- Clade: Pancrustacea
- Class: Insecta
- Order: Lepidoptera
- Family: Coleophoridae
- Genus: Coleophora
- Species: C. fretella

Binomial name
- Coleophora fretella Zeller, 1847

Synonyms
- Coleophora pabulella Zeller, 1847; Coleophora marianii Toll, 1943; Coleophora gilveolella Toll, 1954; Coleophora laticostella Toll, 1962

Species of moth

Coleophora fretella is a moth of the family Coleophoridae. It is found in Spain, Italy, Serbia and Montenegro, Greece and Turkey.
