= Coleophora bojalyshi =

Scientific classification
- Kingdom: Animalia
- Phylum: Arthropoda
- Class: Insecta
- Order: Lepidoptera
- Family: Coleophoridae
- Genus: Coleophora
- Species: C. bojalyshi

Binomial name
- Coleophora bojalyshi Falkovich, 1972

Species of moth

Coleophora bojalyshi is a moth of the family Coleophoridae. It is found in Uzbekistan.
