= Coleophora ramosella =

Scientific classification
- Kingdom: Animalia
- Phylum: Arthropoda
- Class: Insecta
- Order: Lepidoptera
- Family: Coleophoridae
- Genus: Coleophora
- Species: C. ramosella

Binomial name
- Coleophora ramosella Zeller, 1849

Synonyms
- Coleophora albicornis Benander, 1936; Eupista vlachi Toll, 1953

Species of moth

Coleophora ramosella is a moth of the family Coleophoridae. It is found from Fennoscandia to the Pyrenees, Italy and Hungary and from Ireland to Slovakia. It is also found in southern Russia.

The wingspan is 10–12 mm (0.39–0.47 in). Adult moths are heavily streaked white on a yellowish-ochre ground colour. images

The moth flies in June and July

Full-grown larvae can be found in June on Solidago, and Bellis perennis.
