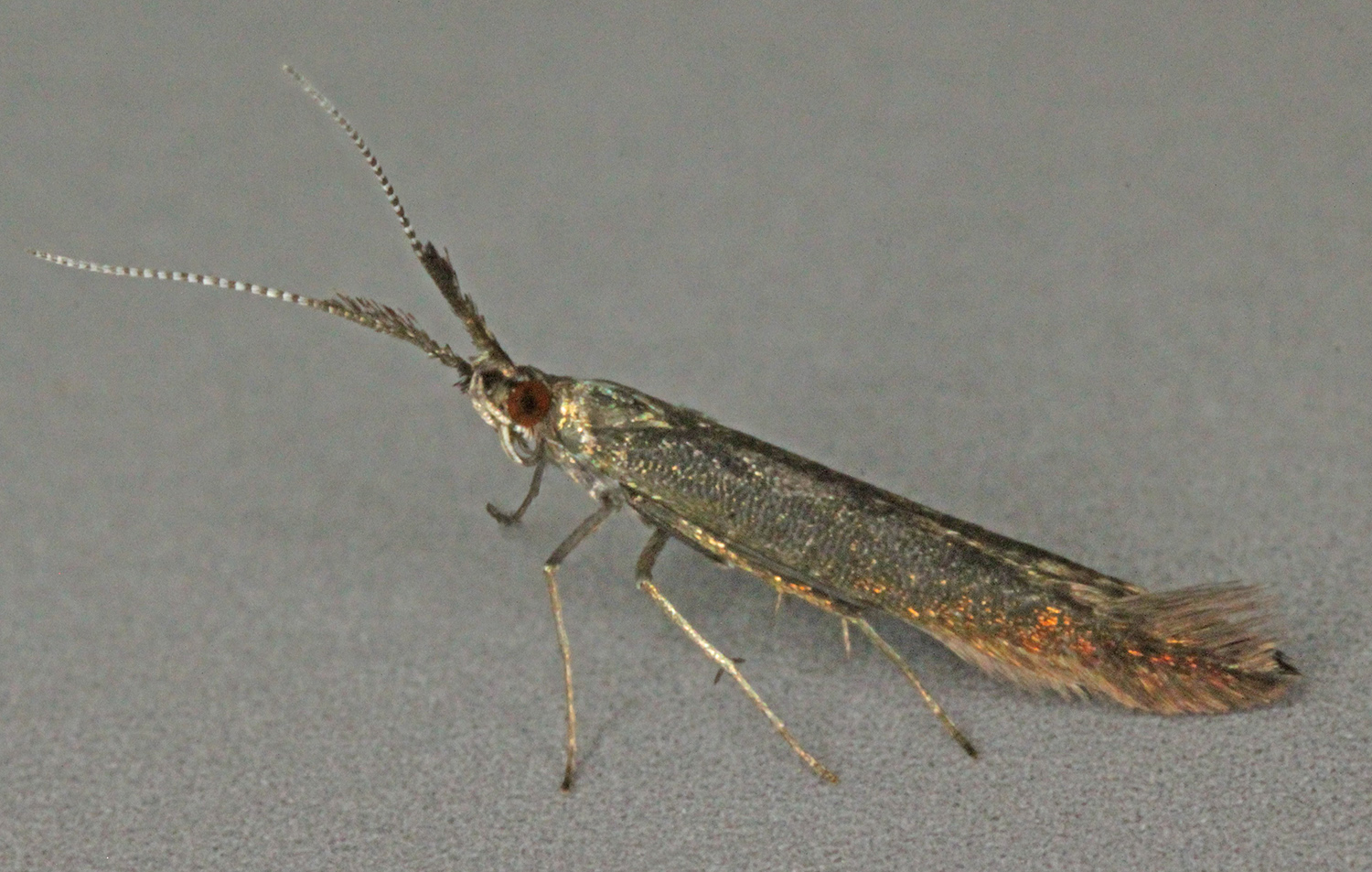
- Coleophora mayrella, Roundton Hill, North Wales

Scientific classification
- Kingdom: Animalia
- Phylum: Arthropoda
- Clade: Pancrustacea
- Class: Insecta
- Order: Lepidoptera
- Family: Coleophoridae
- Genus: Coleophora
- Species: C. mayrella

Binomial name
- Coleophora mayrella (Hübner, 1813)

Synonyms
- List: Tinea mayrella Hübner, 1813; Phalaena (Tinea) fabriciella Villers, 1789; Porrectaria spissicornis Haworth, 1828; Elachista trochilipennella Costa, 1836; Coleophora coruscipennella Clemens, 1860; Coleophora aeneusella Chambers, 1874; Coleophora auropurpuriella Chambers, 1874; Coleophora tuscaemiliella Costantini, 1923; Damophila moldaviella Nemes, 2004

= Coleophora mayrella =

Metallic coleophora moth

Species of moth

The metallic coleophora moth (Coleophora mayrella) is a moth of the family Coleophoridae. It is native to Europe and Armenia, but is an adventive species in the Nearctic realm, where it is found throughout the United States and southern Canada. It has also been recorded from New Zealand, Chile and Argentina.

== Description ==
The wingspan is 10–12 millimetres (0.39–0.47 in). It is one of the metallic green Coleophora differentiated by its black and white ringed antennae, heavily clothed with bronze scales to 2/5ths.Coleophora deauratella has grey antennae from 2/5 excepting a white tip.

They fly during the day as well as after dark. They are on wing in June and July in western Europe and from May to August in North America.
