= Coleophora tadzhikiella =

Scientific classification
- Kingdom: Animalia
- Phylum: Arthropoda
- Class: Insecta
- Order: Lepidoptera
- Family: Coleophoridae
- Genus: Coleophora
- Species: C. tadzhikiella

Binomial name
- Coleophora tadzhikiella Danilevsky, 1955

Species of moth

Coleophora tadzhikiella is a moth of the family Coleophoridae. It is found in Tajikistan.

The larvae feed on the leaves of Malus, Pyrus, Crataegus, Amygdalus, Cydonia, Prunus, Persica, Cotoneaster, Sorbus and Rosa species.
