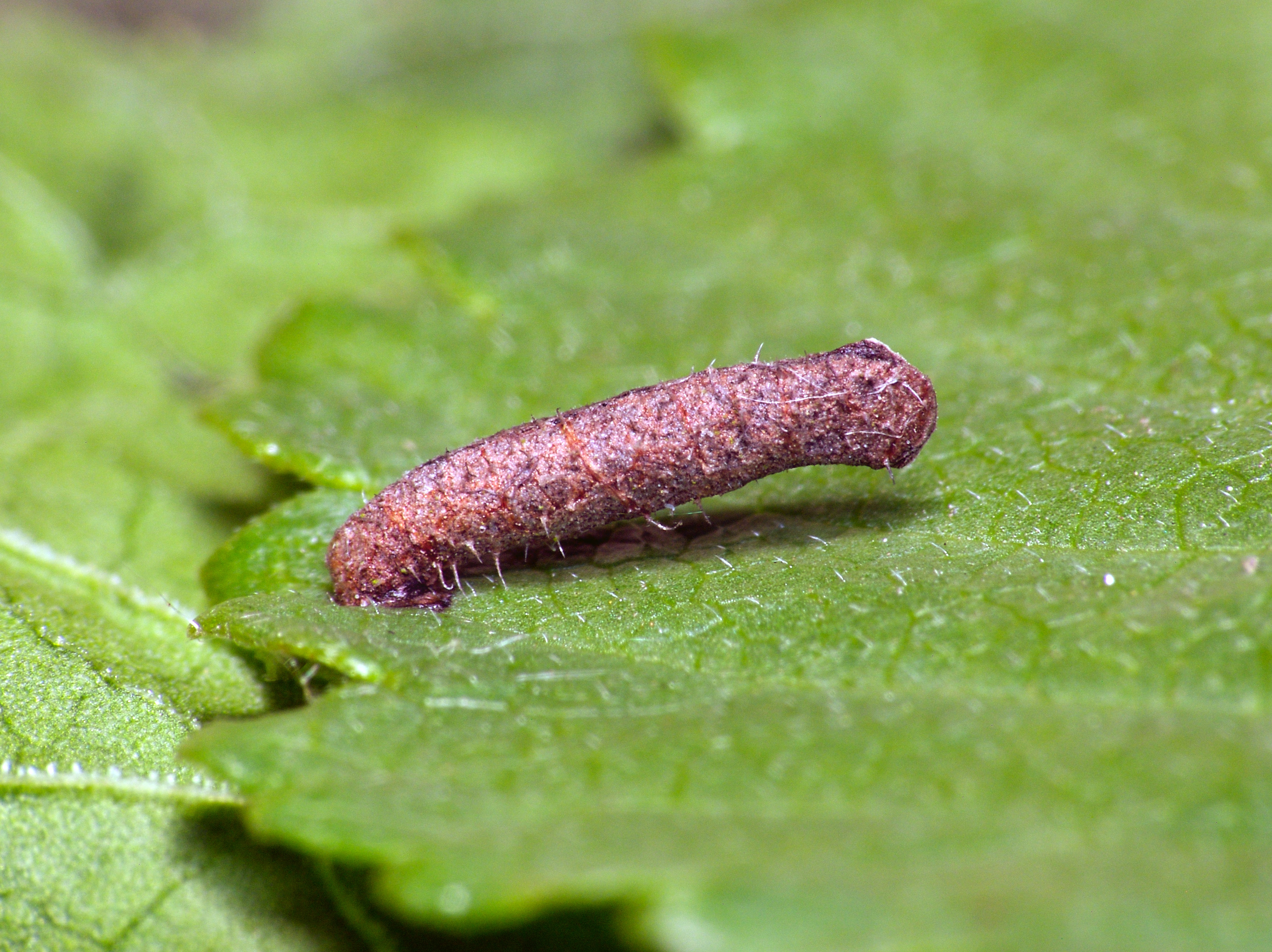

Scientific classification
- Kingdom: Animalia
- Phylum: Arthropoda
- Class: Insecta
- Order: Lepidoptera
- Family: Coleophoridae
- Genus: Coleophora
- Species: C. badiipennella

Binomial name
- Coleophora badiipennella (Duponchel, 1843)

Synonyms
- Ornix badiipennella Duponchel, 1843

= Coleophora badiipennella =

Species of moth

Coleophora badiipennella is a moth of the family Coleophoridae described by Philogène Auguste Joseph Duponchel in 1843. It lives in Europe, from Fennoscandia to the Mediterranean Sea and from Great Britain to southern Russia, as well as North America.

The moth's wingspan is 9–11 mm (0.35–0.43 in). It flies from June to July, depending on the location.

The larvae feed on Ulmus procera, Ulmus minor, Corylus, Prunus spinosa, Fraxinus and Acer.
