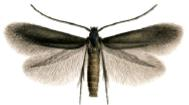
- Adult
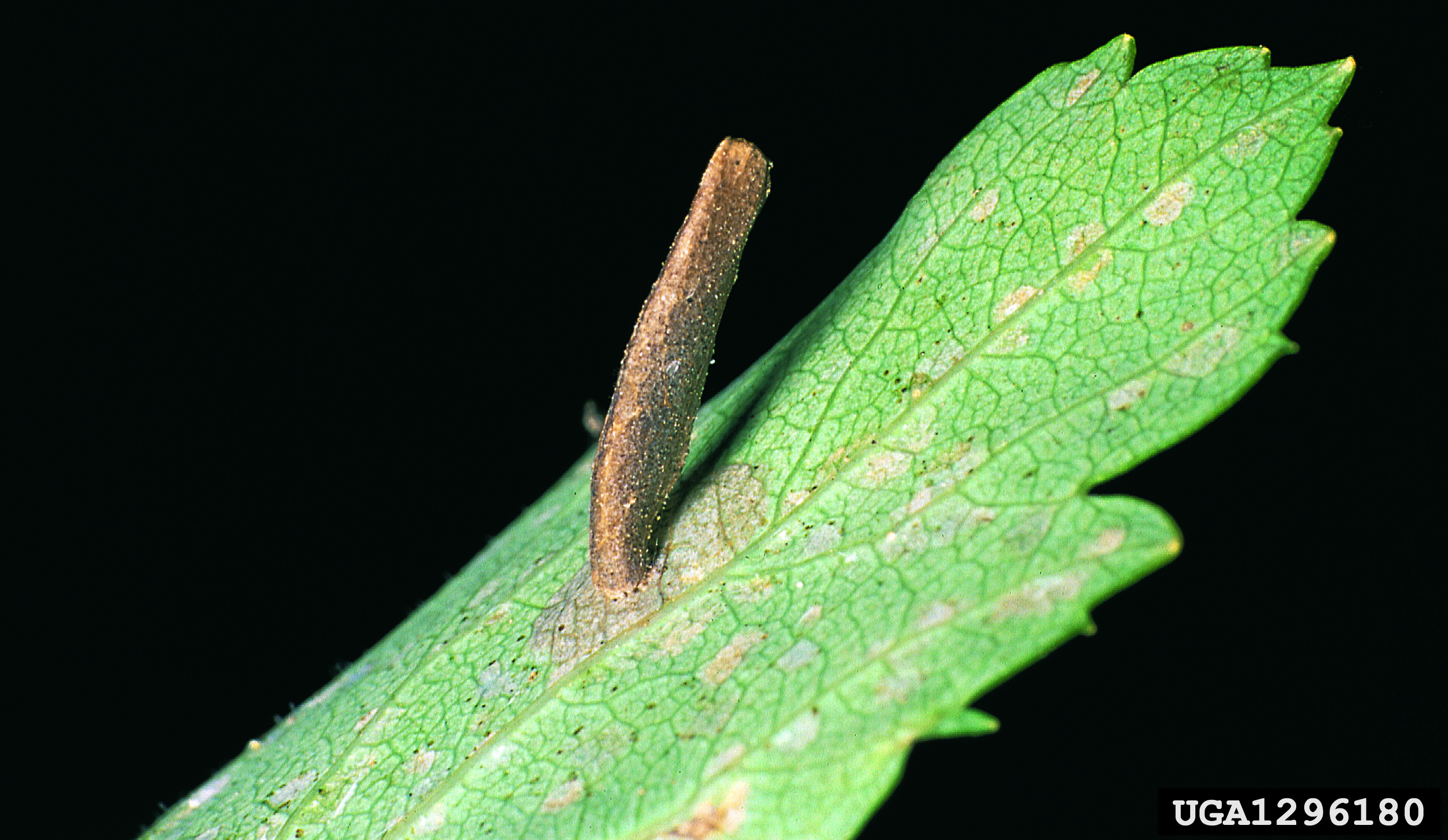
- Leafminer sack

Scientific classification
- Kingdom: Animalia
- Phylum: Arthropoda
- Class: Insecta
- Order: Lepidoptera
- Family: Coleophoridae
- Genus: Coleophora
- Species: C. spiraeella

Binomial name
- Coleophora spiraeella Rebel, 1916

= Coleophora spiraeella =

Species of moth

Coleophora spiraeella is a moth of the family Coleophoridae. It is found in Central and Southern Europe, from Germany and Poland to Italy and Slovenia.

The wingspan is 9–12 mm (0.35–0.47 in).

The larvae feed on Filipendula ulmaria, Spiraea hypericifolia obovata, Spiraea japonica, Spiraea media, Spiraea salicifolia and Ulmaria palustris. Larvae can be found from June to September.
