= Coleophora linosyris =

Scientific classification
- Kingdom: Animalia
- Phylum: Arthropoda
- Class: Insecta
- Order: Lepidoptera
- Family: Coleophoridae
- Genus: Coleophora
- Species: C. linosyris

Binomial name
- Coleophora linosyris Hering, 1937

Species of moth

Coleophora linosyris is a moth of the family Coleophoridae. It is found in France, Italy, Austria, the Czech Republic, Slovakia, Hungary and Romania.

The larvae feed on the leaves of Crinitaria linosyris. They feed on the generative organs of their host plant.
