= Coleophora lycii =

Scientific classification
- Kingdom: Animalia
- Phylum: Arthropoda
- Class: Insecta
- Order: Lepidoptera
- Family: Coleophoridae
- Genus: Coleophora
- Species: C. lycii

Binomial name
- Coleophora lycii Falkovitsh, 1972

Species of moth

Coleophora lycii is a moth of the family Coleophoridae. It is found in Turkestan and Uzbekistan.
