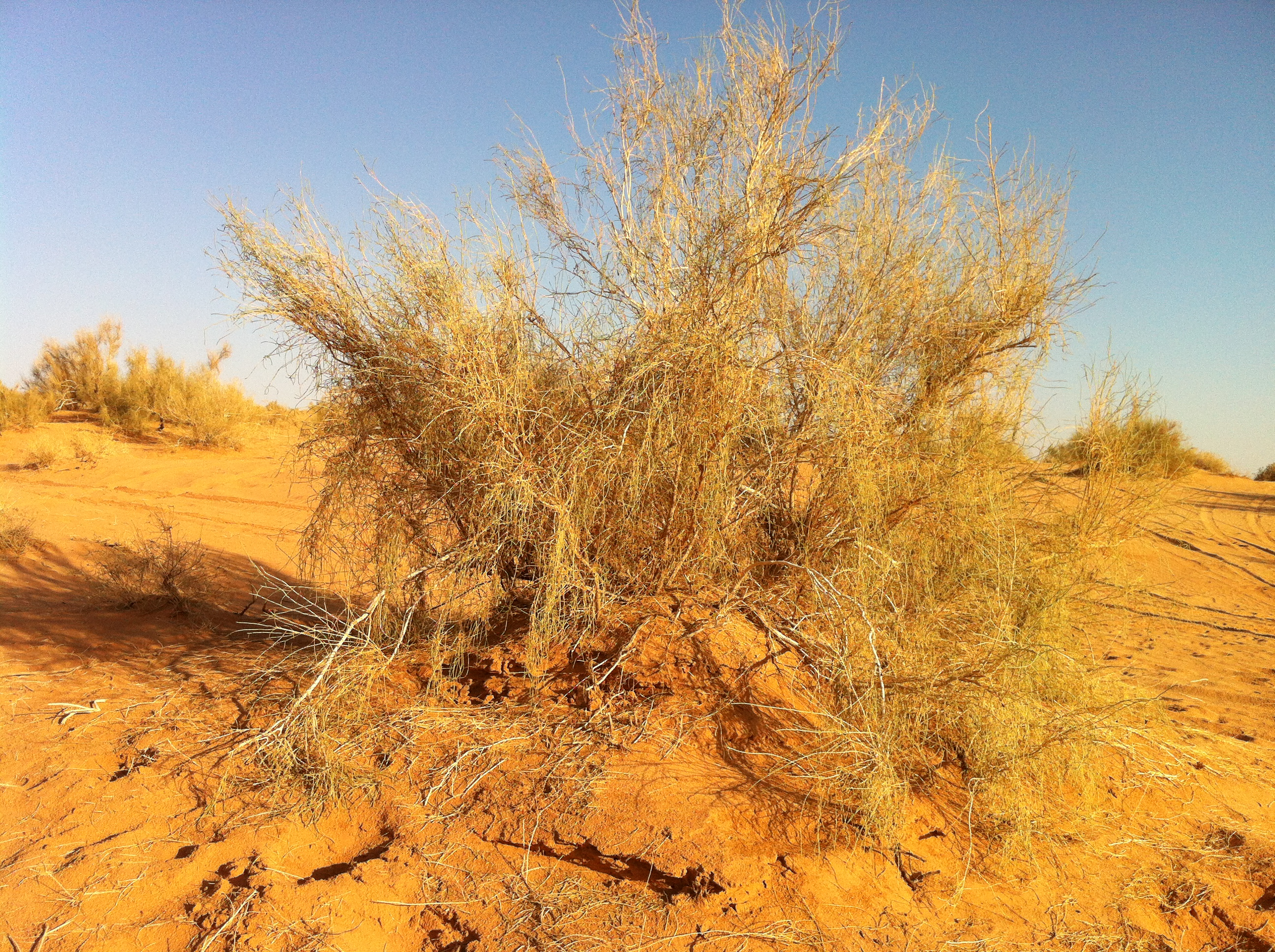
- Haloxylon persicum in Unaizah

Conservation status
- Least Concern (IUCN 3.1)

Scientific classification
- Kingdom: Plantae
- Clade: Tracheophytes
- Clade: Angiosperms
- Clade: Eudicots
- Order: Caryophyllales
- Family: Amaranthaceae
- Genus: Haloxylon
- Species: H. persicum

Binomial name
- Haloxylon persicum Bunge

= Haloxylon persicum =

Species of plant

Haloxylon persicum, the white saxaul, is a small tree belonging to the family Amaranthaceae. Its range is Western Asia, including the Palestine region, Egypt, Sinai, Israel, South Iraq, Saudi Arabia, Iran, Oman, UAE, Afghanistan, Pakistan, Central Asia (Kyrgyzstan, Turkmenistan, etc.), and China (Xinjiang etc.).

== Description ==
The Haloxylon persicum has a stout rugged stem and light grey bark, growing up to 4.5–5 metres in height. It lacks large foliage-type leaves; in fact, its leaves have retrogressed as succulent branches. The plant is found in sandhills, deserts and sand ridges, where it often forms pure stands, with an average density up to 400-500 trees a hectare. The white saxaul is a hardy tree that can grow in nutritionally poor soil and can tolerate drought. The tree is in leaf all year, and flowers in May–June.

== Uses ==
The plant's extensive root system is useful for stabilising sandy soils. The wood is durable and heavy and is used in general carpentry. As it burns well and gives a good heat it is used as a fuel. It is called "ghada" in Arabic and was frequently mentioned in classical Arabic poetry.

== Pests ==
Turcmenigena varentzovi (saxaul longhorn beetle, Varentsov's longhorn beetle) is a pest of the white saxaul tree in Kazakhstan, Turkmenistan, and Uzbekistan.
