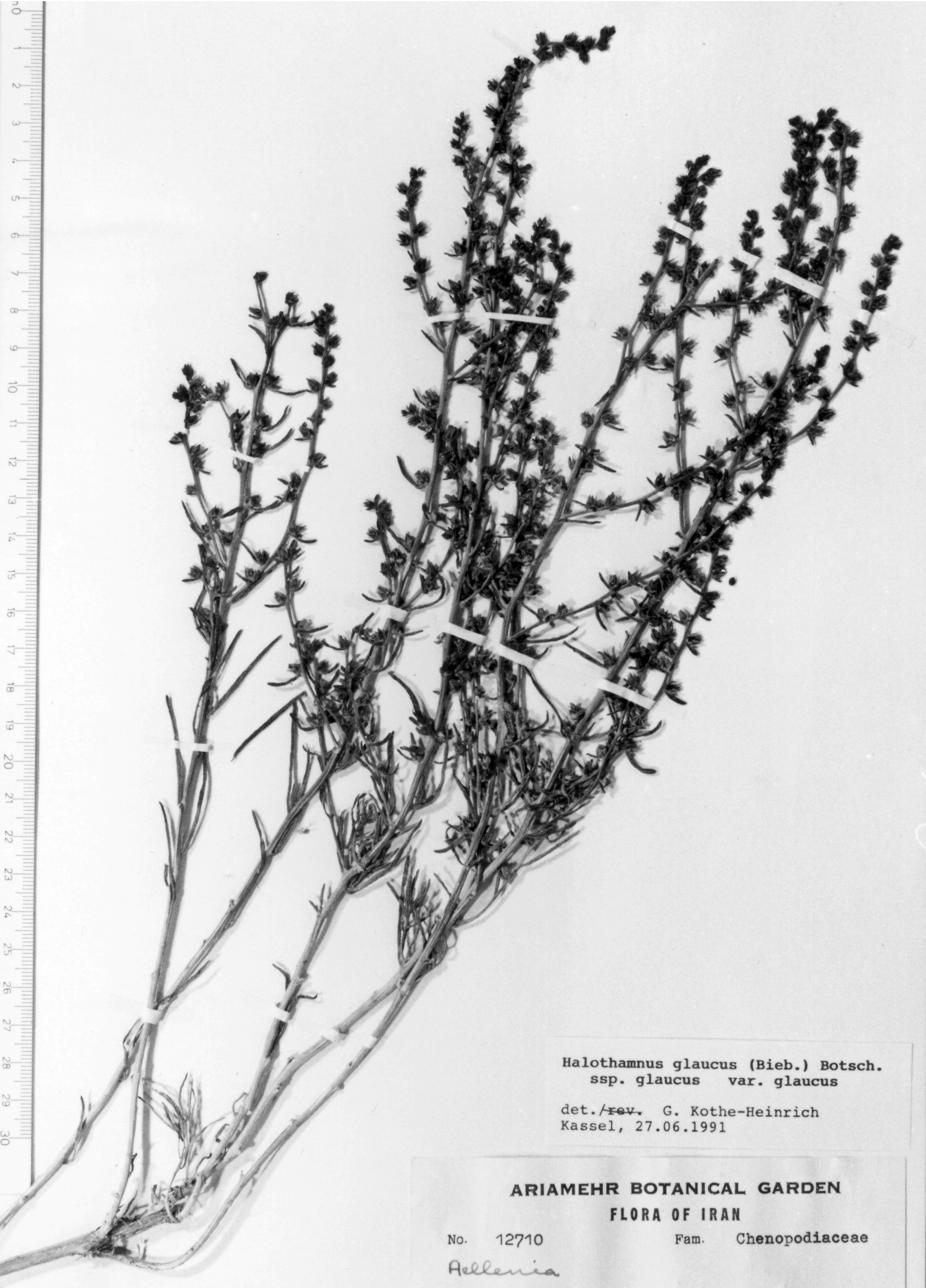

Scientific classification
- Kingdom: Plantae
- Clade: Tracheophytes
- Clade: Angiosperms
- Clade: Eudicots
- Order: Caryophyllales
- Family: Amaranthaceae
- Genus: Halothamnus
- Species: H. glaucus

Binomial name
- Halothamnus glaucus (M.Bieb.) Botsch.

Subspecies
- 3 subspecies, see text

= Halothamnus glaucus =

Species of flowering plant

Halothamnus glaucus is a species of the plant genus Halothamnus, that belongs to the subfamily Salsoloideae of the family Amaranthaceae, (formerly Chenopodiaceae). It occurs in Western and Central Asia.

== Morphology ==
Halothamnus glaucus is a sub-shrub up to 1 m high, with blueish-green pale-striped branches. The leaves are half-terete, fleshy, linear and up to 50 mm long and 0,7-2,0 mm wide. The bracts and bracteoles of the lower flowers resemble the leaves, the bracts having basally wide membraneous margins. The flowers are 3,5-5,0 mm long with lanceolate-oval tepals, the stigmas are rounded at their tip. The winged fruit is 11–17 mm in diameter, its wings inserted in or something below the middle. The tube of the fruit is broadly cylindric, often dilated to its base, its bottom with circular-oval pits.

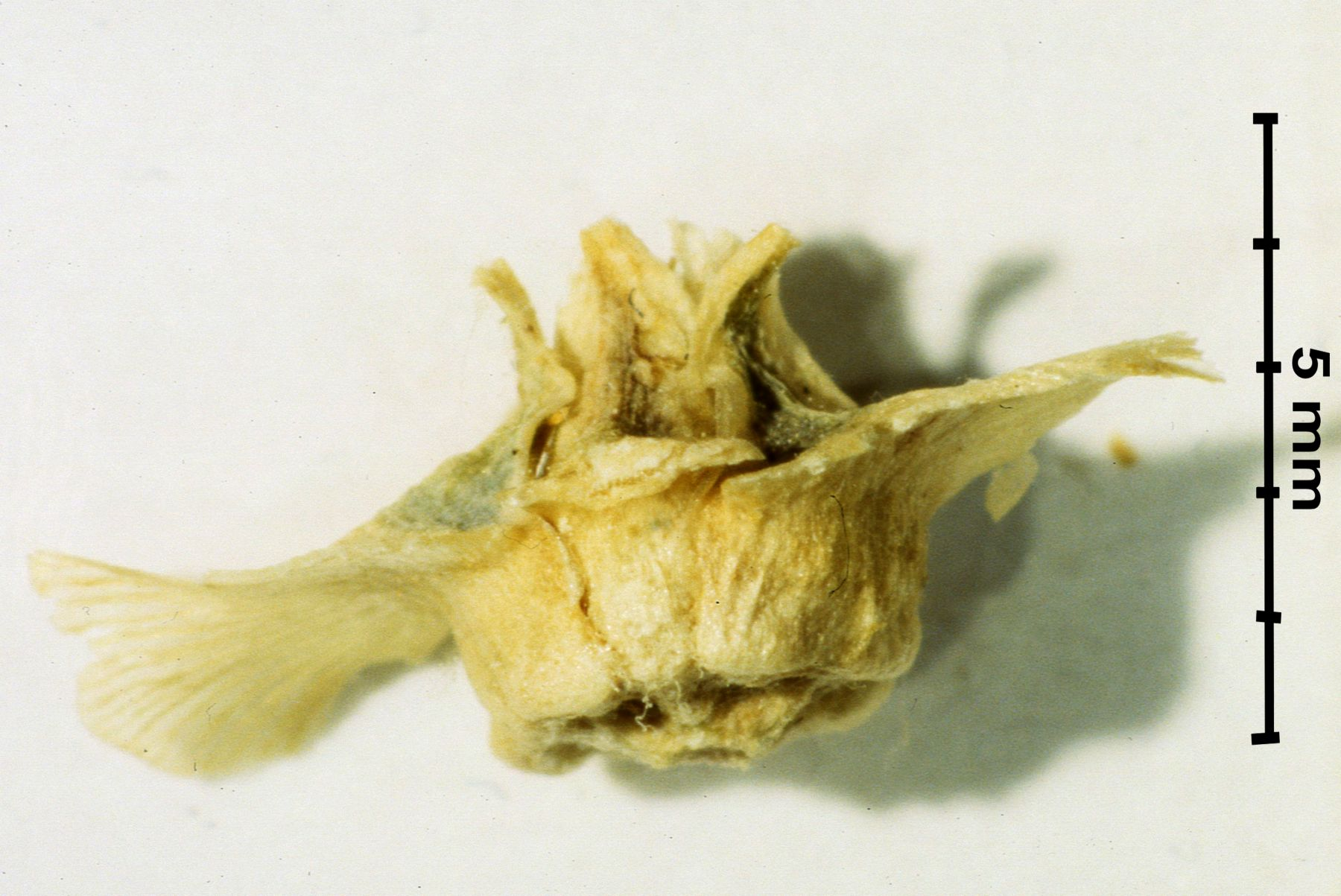
fruit (lateral view)

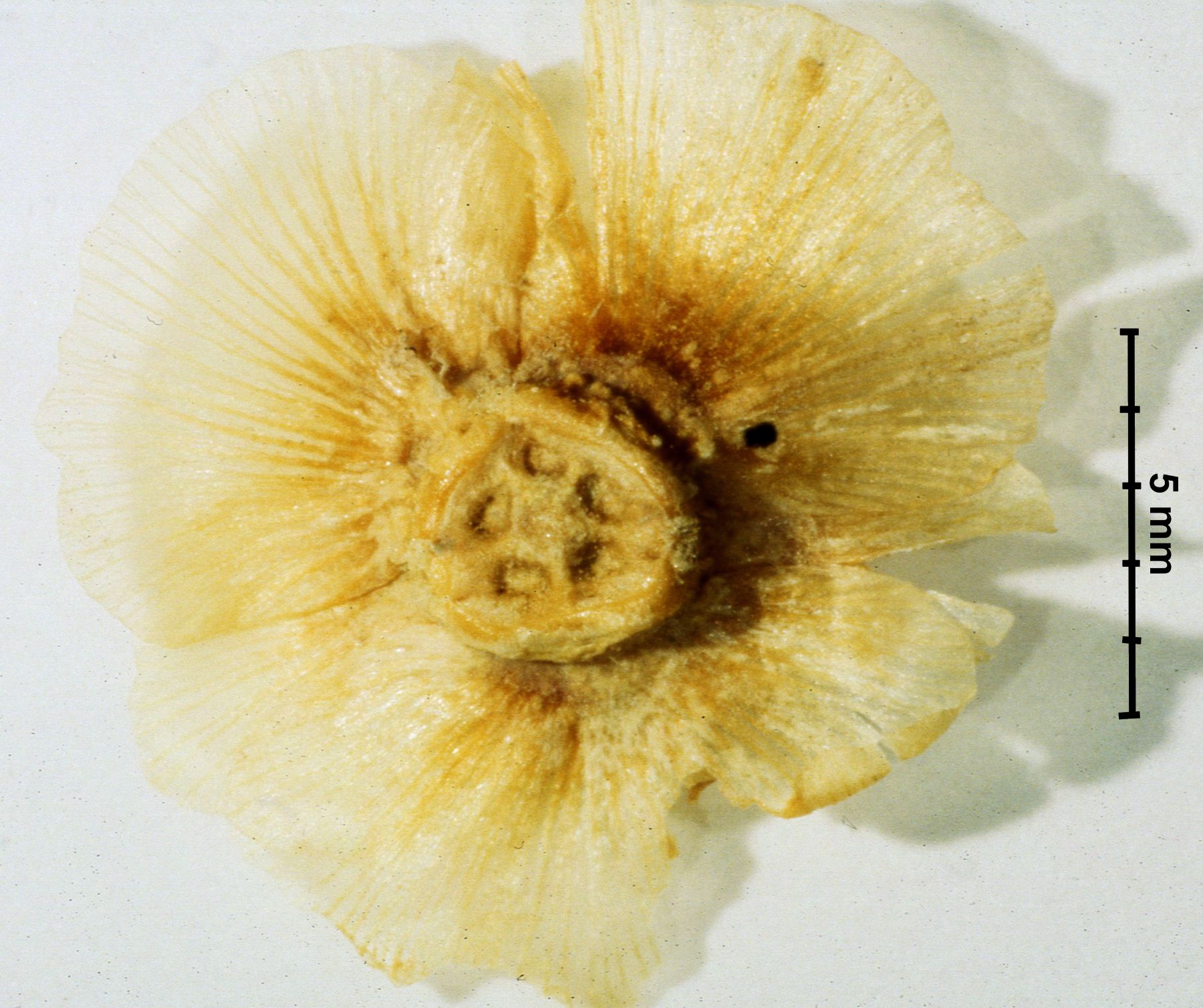
fruit (bottom

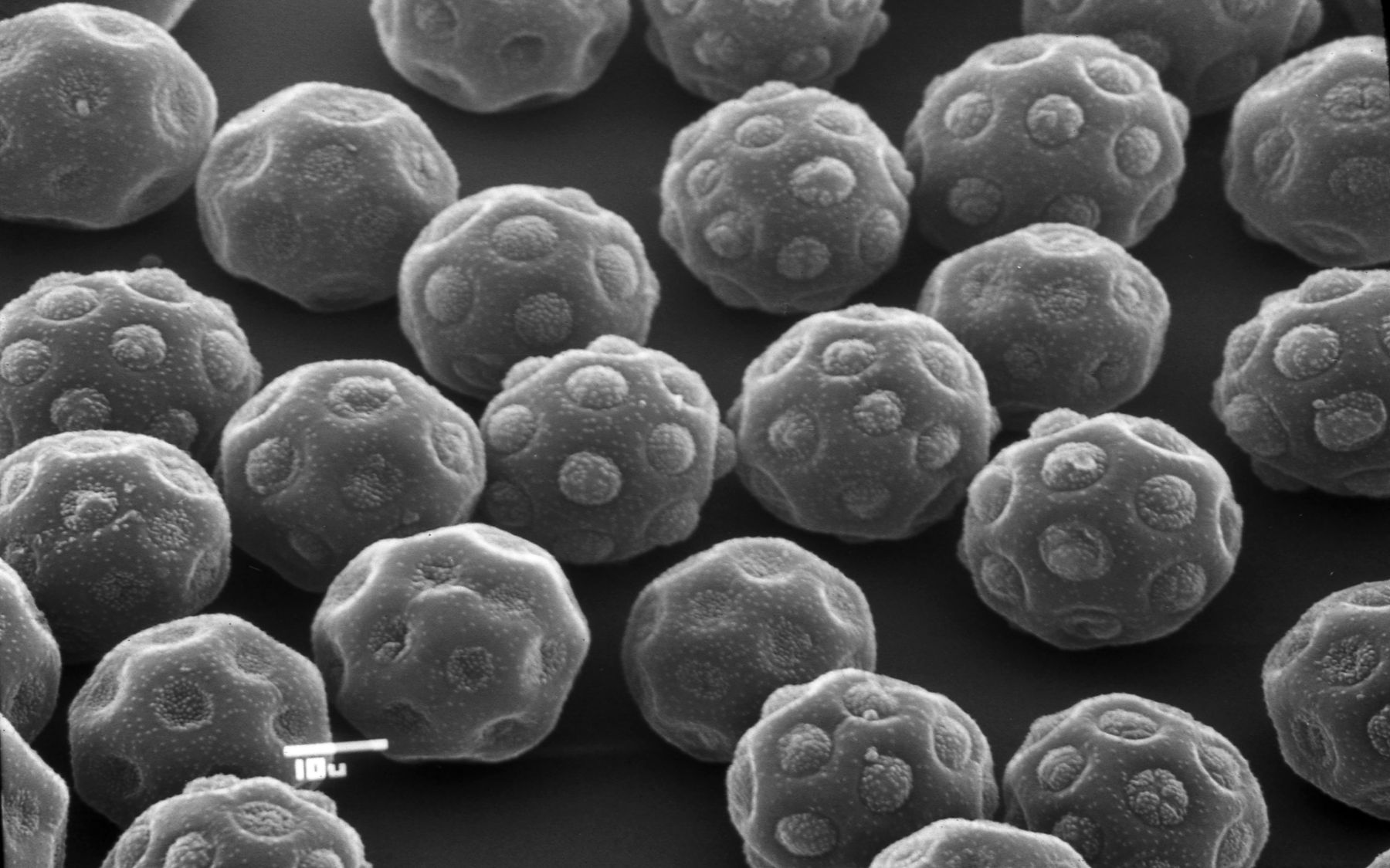
Pollen grains of Halothamnus glaucus

The species comprises three subspecies: subsp. glaucus, glabrous, and the stamen filaments 0,6-0,9 mm wide; subsp. hispidulus, densely hairy, and the stamen filaments only 0,5-0,7 mm wide; and subsp. tianschanicus with truncate stigmas.

== Taxonomy ==
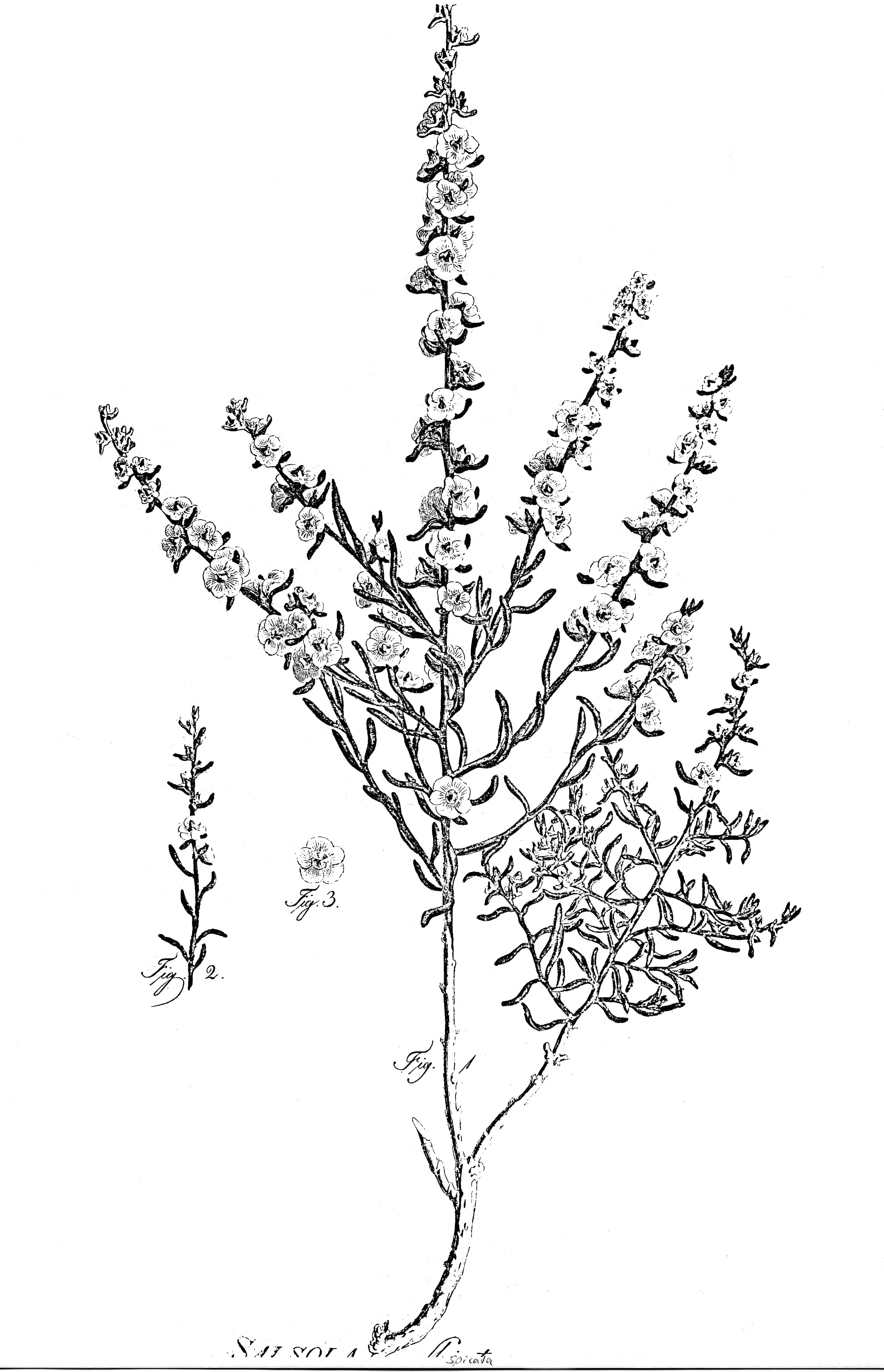
Illustration of Halothamnus glaucus

The species has been first described in 1798 by Friedrich August Marschall von Bieberstein as Salsola glauca (In: Tableau des provinces situées sur la côte occidentale de la Mer Caspienne, St. Pétersbourg, 1798, p. 112). In 1981, Victor Petrovič Botschantzev included it into the genus Halothamnus (In: Bot. Mater. Gerb. Bot. Inst. Komarova Akad. Nauk SSSR 18: p. 157). Within the genus, it belongs to section Halothamnus.

Halothamnus glaucus is classified into three subspecies:

Halothamnus glaucus subsp. glaucus

Synonyms:

- Salsola glauca M.Bieb.
- Caroxylon glaucum (M.Bieb.) Moq.
- Aellenia glauca (M.Bieb.) Aellen
- Aellenia glauca (M.Bieb.) Aellen subsp. eu-glauca Aellen, nom.inval
- Aellenia glauca (M.Bieb.) Aellen subsp. glauca
- Aellenia glauca (M.Bieb.) Aellen subsp. eu-glauca Aellen f. reducta Aellen
- Salsola spicata Pall. (non Willd. 1798), nom.illeg
- Halothamnus heptapotamicus Botsch.

Halothamnus glaucus subsp. hispidulus (Bunge) Kothe-Heinr.

Synonyms:

- Caroxylon hispidulum Bunge
- Salsola hispidula (Bunge) Boiss
- Salsola hispidula (Bunge) Bunge, nom.inval
- Aellenia glauca (M.Bieb.) Aellen ssp. hispidula (Bunge) Aellen
- Aellenia hispidula (Bunge) Botsch.
- Aellenia hispidula (Bunge) Aellen, nom. Inval
- Halothamnus hispidulus (Bunge) Botsch.

Halothamnus glaucus subsp. tianschanicus (Botsch.) Kothe-Heinr.

Synonyms:

- Halothamnus tianschanicus Botsch.

== Distribution ==
The distribution of Halothamnus glaucus extends from eastern Turkey over Georgia, Armenia, Azerbaijan, Turkmenistan, northern Iran, Kazakhstan, Uzbekistan, Kyrgyzstan to China (Dzungaria, possibly Kashgaria) and Mongolia, too. It grows in dry semideserts or mountain steppes on stony or clayey ground, partly on salty soils, up to 2000 m above sea-level.

== Cultivation and uses ==
Halothamnus glaucus is an important fodder plant for camels, sheep and goats and is locally cultivated. In former centuries, potash was extracted from the ash of the plants. The roots and above ground parts of the plants are containing alkaloids.

== Vernacular names ==
- Azerbaijan: "Lekeli Š."
- Iran, Khorasan: "Baebae", "Baebae-shour"
- Turkmenistan: "Čoganok", "Čogon"
- China: 新疆藜 xin jiang li
