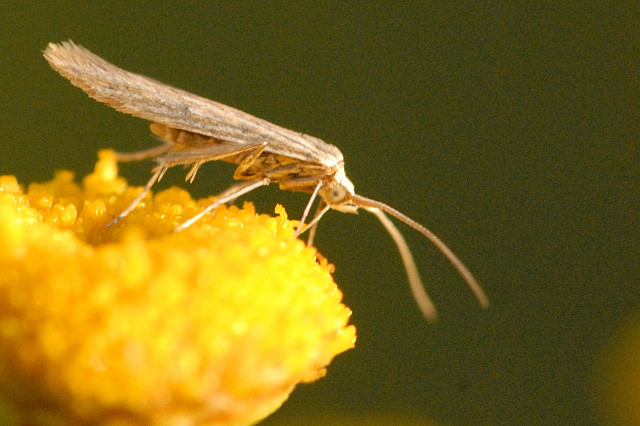
- Adult Coleophora striatipennella

Scientific classification
- Kingdom: Animalia
- Phylum: Arthropoda
- Clade: Pancrustacea
- Class: Insecta
- Order: Lepidoptera
- Family: Coleophoridae
- Genus: Coleophora; Hübner, 1822

Type species
- Tinea anatipennella Hübner, 1796

Diversity
- See separate list of about 1,350 species

Synonyms
- See table

= Coleophora =

Genus of moths

Coleophora is a very large genus of moths of the family Coleophoridae. It contains some 1,350 described species. The genus is represented on all continents, but the majority are found in the Nearctic and Palaearctic regions. Many authors have tried splitting the genus into numerous smaller ones, but most of these have not become widely accepted.

As with most members of the family, the larvae initially feed on the seeds, flowers or leaves of the host plant, but when larger, they feed externally and construct distinctive protective silken cases, often incorporating plant material. Many species have specific host plants; discarded larval cases are often scattered thickly on affected plants.

== Technical description ==
Based on terms described in the article External morphology of Lepidoptera: Antennae 4/5, porrected in repose, often thickened with scales towards base, in male simple, basal joint long, usually with rough scales or projecting tuft. Labial palpi rather long, recurved, second joint more or less roughscaled or tufted towards apex beneath, terminal shorter, acute. Posterior tibiae rough-haired. Forewings with costa often long-haired beneath; lb furcate, 4 sometimes absent, 5 absent, 6 and 7 connate or stalked, 7 to costa, 8 absent. Hindwings 2/3, linear-lanceolate, cilia 3-4; transverse veins sometimes partly absent, 4 usually absent, 6 and 7 closely approximated or stalked.

== Gallery ==
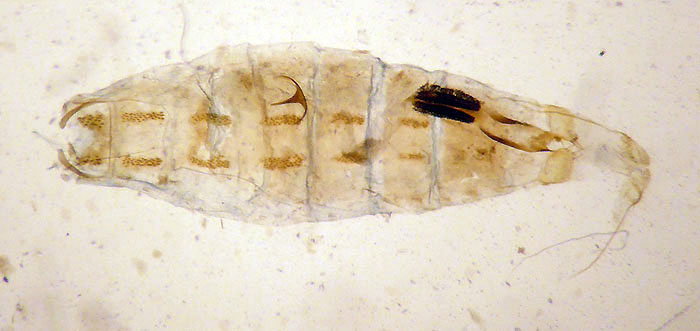
Female genitalia of C. lusciniaepennella

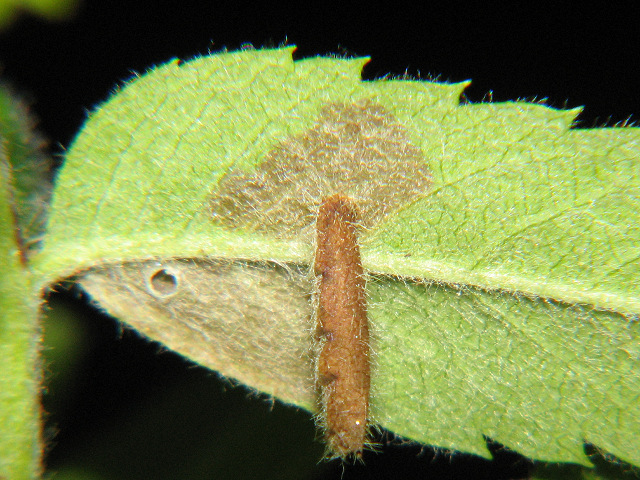
C. serratella case

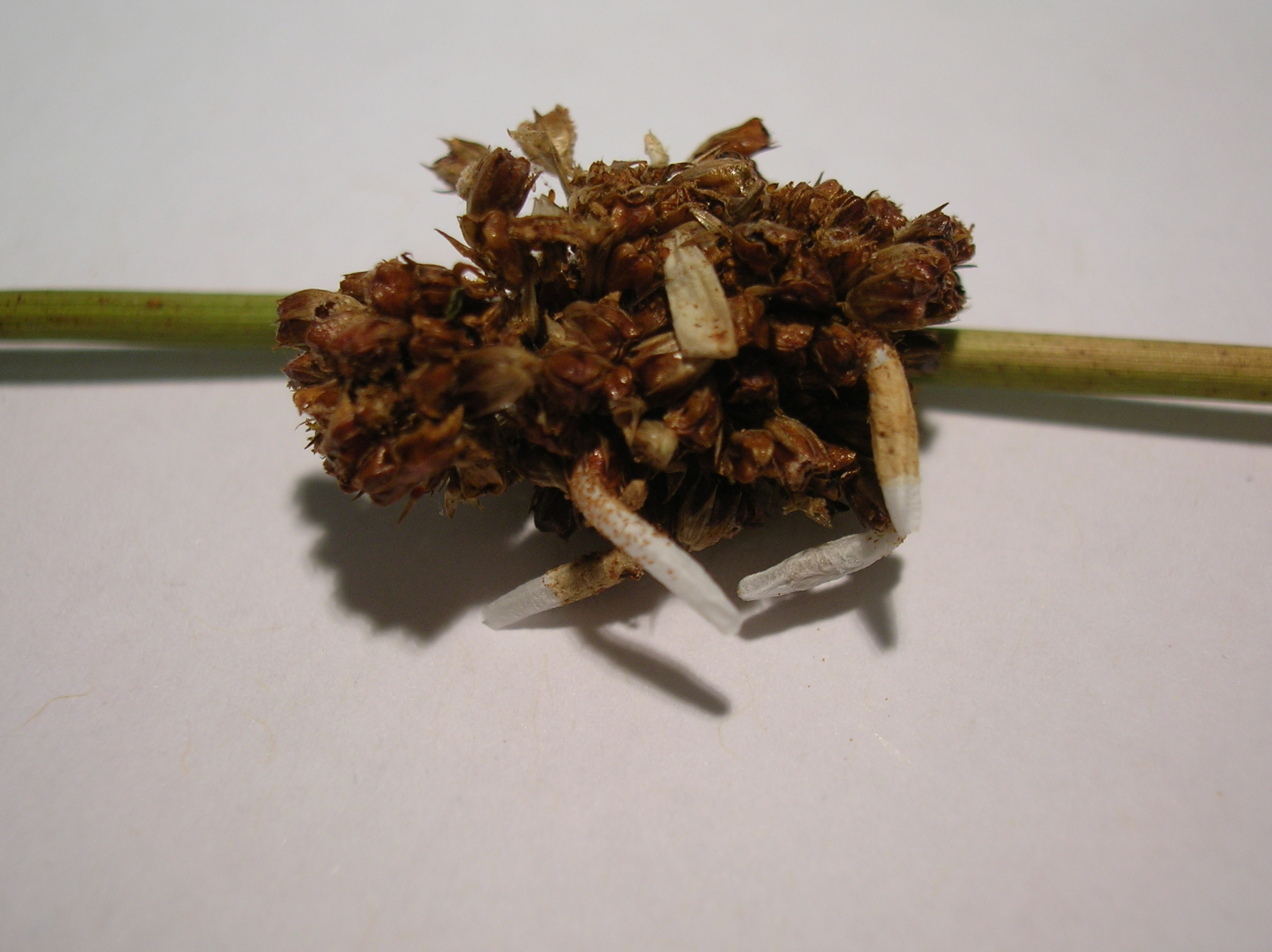
Soft rush (Juncus effusus) inflorescence with feeding damage and cases of C. caespitiella

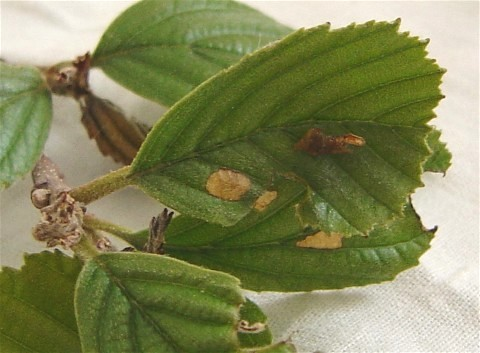
Black alder (Alnus glutinosa) with feeding damage (center) and case (center-right) of C. binderella

== Synonyms ==
Synonym	Source	Year	Notes	Type – species	Source	Year	Replacement name
Abaraschia	Capuse	1973		Coleophora pagmana	Toll	1962	
Agapalsa	Falkovich	1972		Coleophora viminetella	Zeller	1849	
Amselghia	Capuse	1973		Coleophora fringillella	Zeller	1839	
Amseliphora	Capuse	1971		Coleophora niveicostella	Zeller	1839	
Apista	Hübner	1825	junior subjective synonym	Tinea gallipennella	Hübner	1796	
Apocopta	Falkovich	1987		C. campella	Falkovich	1973	
Aporiptura	Falkovich	1972		C. keireuki	Falkovich	1970	
Ardania	Capuse	1973		C. bilineatella	Zeller	1849	
Argyractinia	Falkovich	1972		Porrectaria ochrea	Haworth	1828	
Ascleriductia	Capuse	1973		C. lithargyrinella	Zeller	1849	
Astyages	Stephens	1834	junior objective synonym of Haploptilia				
Atractula	Falkovich	1987		C. lycii	Falkovich	1972	
Aureliania	Capuse	1971	junior homonym of Aureliania		Gosse	1860	Ecebalia
Bacescuia	Capuse	1971		C. moeniacella	Stainton sensu Capuse	1971	
Baraschia	Capuse	1973		C. paradoxella	Toll	1961	
Belina	Falkovich	1987		C. bojalyshi	Falkovich	1972	
Benanderpia	Capuse	1973		C. adspersella	Benander	1939	
Bim	Falkovich	1972	incorrect subsequent spelling of Bima				
Bima	Falkovich	1972		C. arctostaphyli	Meder	1934	
Bourgogneja	Capuse	1971		Phalaena (Tinea) onosmella	Brahm	1791	
Calcomarginia	Capuse	1973		Ornix ballotella	Fischer von Röslerstamm	1839	
Caleophora	Capuse	1973	incorrect subsequent spelling of Coleophora				
Carpochena	Flakovich	1972		C. squalorella	Zeller	1849	
Casas	Wallengren	1881		Tinea leucapennella	Hübner	1796	
Casigneta	Wallengren	1881	junior homonym of Casigneta		Brunner von Wattenwyl	1878	Casignetella
Casignetella	Strand	1928	objective replacement name	C. millefolii	Zeller	1849	
Characia	Falkovich	1972		C. haloxyli	Falkovich	1970	
Chnoocera	Flakovich	1972		C. botaurella	Herrich-Schäffer	1861	
Corethropoea	Falkovich	1972		C. elephantella	Falkovich	1970	
Cornulivalvulia	Capuse	1973		C. vicinella	Zeller	1849	
Corothropoea	Capuse	1973	incorrect subsequent spelling of Corethropoea				
Cricotechna	Falkovich	1972		C. vitisella	Gregson	1856	
Damophila	J. Curtis	1832	junior subjective synonym	Porrectaria spissicornis (C. mayrella)	Haworth	1828	
Ductispira	Capuse	1974		C. unistriella	Caradja	1920	
Dumitrescumia	Capuse	1975		C. cecidophorella	Oudejans	1972	
Ecebalia	Capuse	1973		Ornix laripennella	Zetterstedt	1839	
Eupista	Hübner	1825	junior subjective synonym	Tinea ornatipennella	Hübner	1796	
Falkovitshia	Capuse	1972	misspelling Falkovitschia	Falkovitshia marcella	Capuse	1972	
Frederickoenigia	Capuse	1971		Ornix flavipennella	Duponchel	1843	
Glaseria	Capuse	1971		C. biseriatella	Staudinger	1859	
Globulia	Capuse	1975		C. cornuta	Heinemann & Wocke	1876	
Glochis	Falkovich	1987		C. tshogoni	Falkovich	1972	
Hamuliella	Capuse	1973		C. otitae	Zeller	1839	
Haploptilia	Hübner	1825	junior subjective synonym	Tinea coracipennella	Hübner	1796	
Helopharea	Falkovich	1972		C. ledi	Stainton	1860	
Helvalbia	Capuse	1973		Porrectaria lineolea	Haworth	1828	
Heringiella	Börner	1944	junior homonym of Heringiella		Berg	1898	Carpochena
Ionescumia	Capuse	1971		C. clypeiferella	Hofmann	1871	
Ionnemesia	Capuse	1973		C. chalcogrammella	Zeller	1839	
Kasyfia	Capuse	1973		Ornix binderella	Kollar	1832	
Klimeschja	Capuse	1971		C. oriolella	Zeller	1849	
Klimeschjosefia	Capuse	1975	unnecessary replacement name of Klimeschja				
Klinzigedia	Capuse	1971		C. phlomidella	Christoph	1862	
Klinzigia	Capuse	1971	incorrect original spelling of Kinzigedia				
Kuznetzovvlia	Capuse	1973		C. solidaginella	Staudinger	1859	
Latisacculia	Capuse	1973		C. crocinella	Tengström	1848	
Longibacillia	Capuse	1973		C. fergana	Toll	1961	
Lucidaesia	Capuse	1973		Phalaena frischella	Linnaeus sensu Capuse	1973	
Luzulina	Falkovich	1972		C. antennariella	Herrich-Schäffer	1861	
Lvaria	Capuse	1973		C. lassella	Staudinger	1859	
Macrocorystis	Meyrick	1931		C. byrsostola	Meyrick	1931	
Membrania	Capuse	1973		C. calycotomella	Stainton	1869	
Metallosetia	Stephens	1834	junior objective synonym of Damophila				
Metapista	Capuse	1973		C. stramentella	Zeller	1849	
Monotemachia	Falkovich	1972		Tinea auricella	Fabricius	1794	
Multicoloria	Capuse	1973		C. ditella	Zeller	1849	
Nemesia	Capuse	1971	junior homonym of Nemesia		Savigny	1826	Ionnemesia
Neugenvia	Capuse	1973		Eupista vlachi	Toll	1953	
Nosyrislia	Capuse	1973		C. linosyris	E.M. Hering	1937	
Oedicaula	Falkovich	1972		C. serinipennella	Christoph	1872	
Omphalopoda	Falkovich	1987		C. stegosaurus	Falkovich	1972	
Orghidania	Capuse	1971		Tinea gryphipennella	Hübner	1796	
Orthographis	Falkovich	1972		C. brevipalpella	Wocke	1874	
Oudejansia	Capuse	1973		C. obviella	Rebel	1914	
Papyrosipha	Falkovich	1987		C. zhusguni	Falkovich	1972	
Paravalvulia	Capuse	1975		C. spiraeella	Rebel	1916	
Patzakia	Capuse	1973		C. silenella	Herrich-Schäffer	1855	
Perygra	Falkovich	1972		C. caespititiella	Zeller	1839	
Perygridia	Falkovich	1972		C. sylvaticella	Wood	1892	
Phagolamia	Falkovich	1972		C. virgatella	Zeller	1849	
Phylloschema	Falkovich	1972		C. glitzella	Hofmann	1869	
Plegmidia	Falkovich	1972		C. juncicolella	Stainton	1851	
Polystrophia	Falkovich	1987		C. calligoni	Falkovich	1972	
Porrectaria	Haworth	1828	junior objective synonym of Coleophora	Tinea anatipennella	Hübner	1796	
Postvinculia	Capuse	1975		Ornix lutipennella	Zeller	1838	
Proglaseria	Capuse	1973		C. laticostella	J.J. Mann	1859	
Protocryptis	Meyrick	1931		Protocryptis obducta	Meyrick	1931	
Quadratia	Capuse	1975		C. fuscocuprella	Herrich-Schäffer	1854	
Ramidomia	Falkovitsh	2005		C. micronotella	Toll	1956	
Razowskia	Capuse	1971		C. hafneri	Prohaska	1923	
Rhabdoeca	Falkovich	1987		C. galligena	Falkovich	1970	
Rhamnia	Capuse	1975		C. ahenella	Heinemann	1876	
Sacculia	Capuse	1975		C. excellens	Toll	1952	
Scleriductia	Capuse	1973		C. ochripennella	Zeller	1849	
Stabilaria	Falkovich	1988		C. univittella	Staudinger	1880	
Stollia	Capuse	1971	junior homonym of Stollia		Ellenrieder	1862	Coleophora
Suireia	Capuse	1971		Ornix badiipennella	Duponchel	1843	
Symphypoda	Falkovich	1972		C. transcaspica	Toll	1959	
Systrophoeca	Falkovich	1972		C. siccifolia	Stainton	1856	
Tolleophora	Capuse	1971		C. asthenella	Constant	1893	
Tollsia	Capuse	1973		C. hornigi	Toll	1952	
Tritemachia	Falkovich	1987		C. captiosa	Falkovich	1972	
Tuberculia	Capuse	1975		C. albitarsella	Zeller	1849	
Ulna	Capuse	1973		C. saponariella	Heeger	1848	
Valvulongia	Capuse	1971		C. falcigerella	Christoph	1872	
Vladdelia	Capuse	1971		C. niveistrigella	Wocke	1876	
Zagulajevia	Capuse	1971		C. tadzhikiella	Danilevsky	1955	
Zangheriphora	Capuse	1971		Tinea laricella	Hübner	1817	
