= Tinagma klimeschi =

Scientific classification
- Kingdom: Animalia
- Phylum: Arthropoda
- Clade: Pancrustacea
- Class: Insecta
- Order: Lepidoptera
- Family: Douglasiidae
- Genus: Tinagma
- Species: T. klimeschi

Binomial name
- Tinagma klimeschi Gaedike, 1991

Moth species in family Douglasiidae

Tinagma klimeschi is a moth in the family Douglasiidae. It is found in Israel, Egypt and on Rhodes and Cyprus.

The wingspan is 7–9 mm. The forewings are white with grey scales.

The larvae feed on Echium diffusum. They mine the leaves of their host plant.
