= Heart of Jesus =

Heart of Jesus may refer to:

- Sacred Heart of Jesus, as an object of religious devotion
- Sacred Heart Church (disambiguation)
- Caladium, or heart of Jesus, a genus of flowering plants
  - Caladium bicolor, a.k.a. heart of Jesus, a species of houseplant from Latin America
