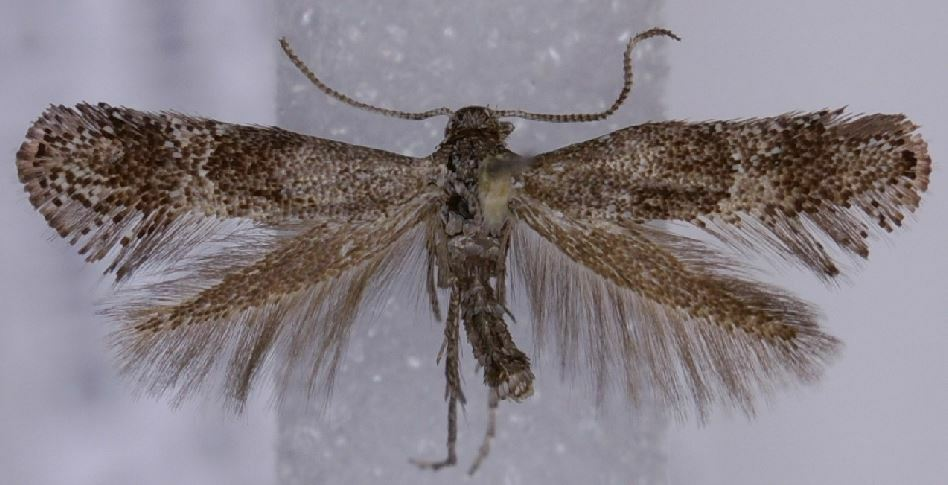

Scientific classification
- Kingdom: Animalia
- Phylum: Arthropoda
- Class: Insecta
- Order: Lepidoptera
- Family: Douglasiidae
- Genus: Tinagma
- Species: T. obscurofasciella

Binomial name
- Tinagma obscurofasciella (Chambers, 1881)

Synonyms
- Douglasia obscurofasciella Chambers, 1881; Tinagma crenulellum Engel, 1907

= Tinagma obscurofasciella =

Moth species in family Douglasiidae

Tinagma obscurofasciella is a species of moth in the family Douglasiidae. It is found in North America, where it has been recorded from Kentucky, Maine, Michigan and Minnesota.

Adults have been recorded on wing in April and June.

The larvae feed on various rosaceous plants, including Geum and Potentilla species. They mine the leaves of their host plant.
