= Klimeschia thymetella =

Scientific classification
- Domain: Eukaryota
- Kingdom: Animalia
- Phylum: Arthropoda
- Class: Insecta
- Order: Lepidoptera
- Family: Douglasiidae
- Genus: Klimeschia
- Species: K. thymetella

Binomial name
- Klimeschia thymetella (Staudinger, 1859)

Synonyms
- Tinagma thymetellum Staudinger, 1859

Moth species in family Douglasiidae

Klimeschia thymetella is a moth in the family Douglasiidae. It was described by Otto Staudinger in 1859. It is found in Portugal and Spain.
