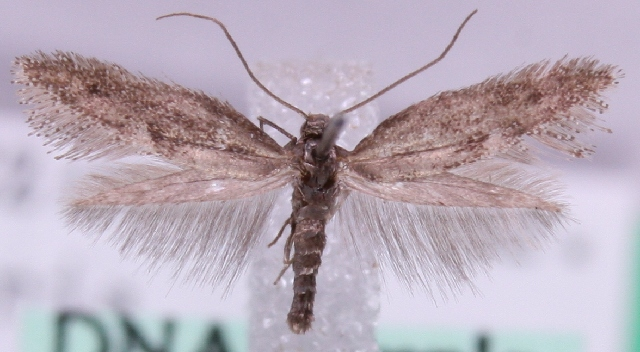

Scientific classification
- Domain: Eukaryota
- Kingdom: Animalia
- Phylum: Arthropoda
- Class: Insecta
- Order: Lepidoptera
- Family: Douglasiidae
- Genus: Tinagma
- Species: T. anchusella

Binomial name
- Tinagma anchusella (Benander, 1936)

Synonyms
- Douglasia anchusella Benander, 1936; Tinagma anchusellum

= Tinagma anchusella =

Moth species in family Douglasiidae

Tinagma anchusella is a moth in the Douglasiidae family. It is found in Denmark, Germany, Austria, Poland, Bulgaria, Greece, Estonia, Latvia, Sweden, Ukraine and on Cyprus. It is also found in Turkey, Jordan and the Caucasus region (Armenia and Azerbaidzhan).

The wingspan is 9–10 mm. Adults are on wing from June to July.

The larvae mine on Anchusa officinalis.
