= Tinagma leucanthes =

Scientific classification
- Domain: Eukaryota
- Kingdom: Animalia
- Phylum: Arthropoda
- Class: Insecta
- Order: Lepidoptera
- Family: Douglasiidae
- Genus: Tinagma
- Species: T. leucanthes

Binomial name
- Tinagma leucanthes Meyrick, 1897

Moth species in family Douglasiidae

Tinagma leucanthes is a moth in the family Douglasiidae. It is found in Australia, where it has been recorded from New South Wales and southern Queensland.
