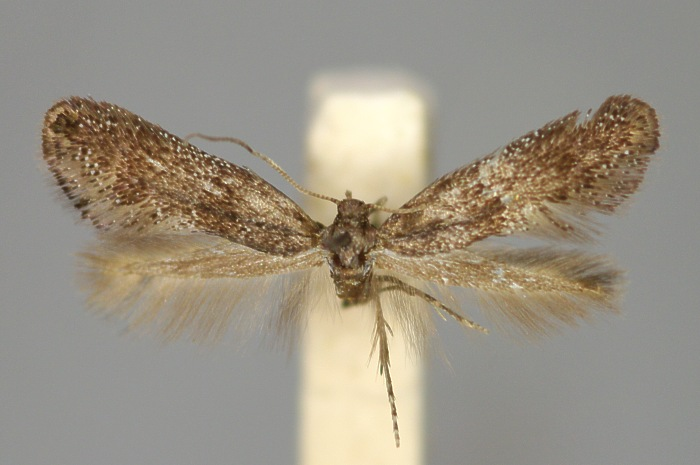

Scientific classification
- Kingdom: Animalia
- Phylum: Arthropoda
- Clade: Pancrustacea
- Class: Insecta
- Order: Lepidoptera
- Family: Douglasiidae
- Genus: Tinagma
- Species: T. signatum

Binomial name
- Tinagma signatum Gaedike, 1991

= Tinagma signatum =

Moth species in family Douglasiidae

Tinagma signatum is a moth in the Douglasiidae family. It is found in the Austria, the Czech Republic, Slovakia, Germany, Italy and Russia.

The larvae possibly feed on Geum montanum.
