= Tinagma grisecens =

Scientific classification
- Kingdom: Animalia
- Phylum: Arthropoda
- Clade: Pancrustacea
- Class: Insecta
- Order: Lepidoptera
- Family: Douglasiidae
- Genus: Tinagma
- Species: T. grisecens

Binomial name
- Tinagma grisecens Stainton, 1867

Synonyms
- Tinagma tabghana Amsel, 1935

Moth species in family Douglasiidae

Tinagma grisecens is a moth in the Douglasiidae family. It is found in Palestine, Syria and Asia Minor.
