= Tinagma hedemanni =

Scientific classification
- Domain: Eukaryota
- Kingdom: Animalia
- Phylum: Arthropoda
- Class: Insecta
- Order: Lepidoptera
- Family: Douglasiidae
- Genus: Tinagma
- Species: T. hedemanni

Binomial name
- Tinagma hedemanni (Caradja, 1920)

Synonyms
- Douglasia hedemanni Caradja, 1920

Moth species in family Douglasiidae

Tinagma hedemanni is a moth in the family Douglasiidae. It is found in Austria, Italy and North Macedonia.
