= Tinagma giganteum =

Scientific classification
- Domain: Eukaryota
- Kingdom: Animalia
- Phylum: Arthropoda
- Class: Insecta
- Order: Lepidoptera
- Family: Douglasiidae
- Genus: Tinagma
- Species: T. giganteum

Binomial name
- Tinagma giganteum Braun, 1921

Synonyms
- Tinagma gigantea

Moth species in family Douglasiidae

Tinagma giganteum is a moth in the family Douglasiidae. It is found in North America, where it has been recorded in Alberta and Montana. The habitat consists of dry meadows.

The wingspan is 14–15 mm. The scales of the ground colour of the forewings are pale grey at their bases, shading into white and followed by a black tip. There is a broad blackish transverse fascia just before the middle of the wing, margined with white on the outer edge. It has a marginal row of nearly black scales. The hindwings are dark grey.
