= Tinagma columbella =

Scientific classification
- Kingdom: Animalia
- Phylum: Arthropoda
- Class: Insecta
- Order: Lepidoptera
- Family: Douglasiidae
- Genus: Tinagma
- Species: T. columbella

Binomial name
- Tinagma columbella Staudinger, 1880

Moth species in family Douglasiidae

Tinagma columbella is a moth in the family Douglasiidae. It is found in Ukraine.
