= Tinagma dryadis =

Scientific classification
- Domain: Eukaryota
- Kingdom: Animalia
- Phylum: Arthropoda
- Class: Insecta
- Order: Lepidoptera
- Family: Douglasiidae
- Genus: Tinagma
- Species: T. dryadis

Binomial name
- Tinagma dryadis Staudinger, 1872

Synonyms
- Tinagma dryadella Frey

Moth species in family Douglasiidae

Tinagma dryadis is a moth of the family Douglasiidae. It was described by Staudinger in 1872. It is found in Scandinavia, northern Russia, France, Switzerland, Austria and Italy.

The wingspan is 7–8 mm. Adults are on wing in July.

The larvae feed on Dryas octopetala.
