= List of Caladium cultivars =

This page lists some of the many Caladium cultivars. There are over 1000 named cultivars of Caladium bicolor alone.

| Cultivar | Image | Patent Number | Species | Parentage |
|---|---|---|---|---|
| 'Blushing Bride' | | US PP22213 | Caladium bicolor | Female: 'Pink Symphony'; Male: 'Aaron' |
| 'Bombshell' | | US PP23817 | Caladium bicolor | Female: 'WS-03-36'; Male: 'Red Flash' |
| 'Candyland' | | US PP18766 | Caladium bicolor | Female: 'Lance Whorton'; Male: 'Gingerland' |
| 'Celebration' | | US PP23993 | Caladium bicolor | Female: 'John Peed'; Male: 'White Christmas' |
| 'Creamsickle' | | US PP23991 | Caladium bicolor | Female: 'Aaron'; Male: 'Twist N' Shout' |
| 'Fannie Munson' | | Unpatented | | |
| 'Fireworks' | | US PP24997 | Caladium bicolor | 'Fire Chief' field mutation |
| 'Florida Red Ruffles' | | US PP13136 | Caladium bicolor | Female: 'GC80-287'; Male: 'Red Frill' |
| 'Florida Sweetheart' | | US PP8526 | Caladium bicolor | Female: 'Candidum Junior'; Male: 'Red Frill' |
| 'Heart's Delight' | | US PP23992 | Caladium bicolor | Female: 'White Wing'; Male: 'Florida Red Ruffles' |
| 'Modern Art' | | Applied for | | |
| 'Party Punch' | | US PP24002 | Caladium bicolor | Female: 'WS-03-36'; Male: 'Red Flash' |
| 'Raspberry Moon' | | US PP20069 | Caladium bicolor | Female: 'Miss Muffet'; Male: 'Fire Chief' |
| 'Sangria' | | Applied for | | |
| 'Scarlet Flame' | | Applied for | | |
| 'Summer Breeze' | | Applied for | | |
| 'White Cap' | | US PP23815 | Caladium bicolor | Female: 'White Christmas'; Male: 'Aaron' |
| 'White Dynasty' | | US PP22240 | Caladium bicolor | Female: 'White Wing'; Male: 'Aaron' |
| 'White Wonder' | | US PP21044 | Caladium bicolor | 'White Wing' self pollination |
