= Tinagma bledella =

Scientific classification
- Domain: Eukaryota
- Kingdom: Animalia
- Phylum: Arthropoda
- Class: Insecta
- Order: Lepidoptera
- Family: Douglasiidae
- Genus: Tinagma
- Species: T. bledella

Binomial name
- Tinagma bledella (Chrétien, 1915)

Synonyms
- Elachista bledella Chrétien, 1915

Moth species in family Douglasiidae

Tinagma bledella is a moth in the family Douglasiidae. It is found in Algeria.

The wingspan is about 8.5 mm. The forewings are white, but reddish-brown in the costal region. The hindwings are violaceous-brown.
