= Tinagma minutissima =

Scientific classification
- Domain: Eukaryota
- Kingdom: Animalia
- Phylum: Arthropoda
- Class: Insecta
- Order: Lepidoptera
- Family: Douglasiidae
- Genus: Tinagma
- Species: T. minutissima

Binomial name
- Tinagma minutissima (Staudinger, 1880)

Synonyms
- Douglasia minutissima Staudinger, 1880; Tinagma minutissimum

Moth species in family Douglasiidae

Tinagma minutissima is a moth in the family Douglasiidae. It is found in Turkey, Ukraine (the Crimea) and Russia (Volgograd).
