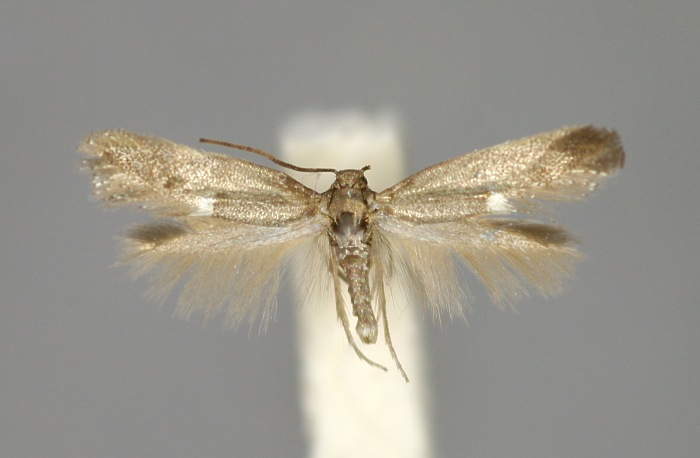

Scientific classification
- Domain: Eukaryota
- Kingdom: Animalia
- Phylum: Arthropoda
- Class: Insecta
- Order: Lepidoptera
- Family: Douglasiidae
- Genus: Tinagma
- Species: T. balteolella

Binomial name
- Tinagma balteolella (Fischer von Röslerstamm, 1841)

Synonyms
- Aechmia balteolella Fischer von Röslerstamm, 1841; Tinagma balteolellum; Tinagma borkhauseniella Herrich-Schaffer, 1855

= Tinagma balteolella =

Moth species in family Douglasiidae

Tinagma balteolella is a moth in the Douglasiidae family. It is found in Great Britain, France, Belgium, the Netherlands, Germany, Switzerland, Austria, Italy, Spain, the Czech Republic, Slovakia, Croatia, Hungary, Romania, Poland, Lithuania and Ukraine. It is also found in Morocco and Jordan.

The wingspan is 8–9 mm (0.31–0.35 in).

The larvae feed on Echium vulgare and Echium biebersteini. They mine the stems of their host plant. The species overwinters in a cocoon.
