= Klimeschia lutumella =

Scientific classification
- Domain: Eukaryota
- Kingdom: Animalia
- Phylum: Arthropoda
- Class: Insecta
- Order: Lepidoptera
- Family: Douglasiidae
- Genus: Klimeschia
- Species: K. lutumella

Binomial name
- Klimeschia lutumella Amsel, 1938

Moth species in family Douglasiidae

Klimeschia lutumella is a moth in the family Douglasiidae. It was described by Hans Georg Amsel in 1938. It is found in Israel.
