= Klimeschia vibratoriella =

Scientific classification
- Domain: Eukaryota
- Kingdom: Animalia
- Phylum: Arthropoda
- Class: Insecta
- Order: Lepidoptera
- Family: Douglasiidae
- Genus: Klimeschia
- Species: K. vibratoriella

Binomial name
- Klimeschia vibratoriella (J. J. Mann, 1862)

Synonyms
- Tinagma vibratoriella J. J. Mann, 1862; Scirtopoda vibratoriella

Moth species in family Douglasiidae

Klimeschia vibratoriella is a moth in the family Douglasiidae. It was described by Josef Johann Mann in 1862. It is found in Turkey.
