= Tinagma mexicanum =

Scientific classification
- Kingdom: Animalia
- Phylum: Arthropoda
- Clade: Pancrustacea
- Class: Insecta
- Order: Lepidoptera
- Family: Douglasiidae
- Genus: Tinagma
- Species: T. mexicanum

Binomial name
- Tinagma mexicanum Gaedike, 1990

Moth species in family Douglasiidae

Tinagma mexicanum is a moth in the Douglasiidae family. It is found in Mexico, where it has been recorded from Baja California.
