= Tinagma ochremaculella =

Scientific classification
- Domain: Eukaryota
- Kingdom: Animalia
- Phylum: Arthropoda
- Class: Insecta
- Order: Lepidoptera
- Family: Douglasiidae
- Genus: Tinagma
- Species: T. ochremaculella

Binomial name
- Tinagma ochremaculella (Chambers, 1875)

Synonyms
- Phigalia ochremaculella Chambers, 1875; Tinagma ochreomaculella Dyar 1903

Moth species in family Douglasiidae

Tinagma ochremaculella is a moth in the family Douglasiidae. It is found in North America, where it has been recorded from Texas.

The forewings are marked with short and indistinct ochreous dashes, one of which is on the fold before the middle, another is placed about the middle beneath the fold. There is another just behind the middle on the disc and one on the costal margin just before the middle, and another further back just within the costal margin. At or just behind the discal vein are two small circular raised tufts of brownish scales. The apex of the wing is suffused with ochreous.
