= Tinagma pulverilinea =

Scientific classification
- Domain: Eukaryota
- Kingdom: Animalia
- Phylum: Arthropoda
- Class: Insecta
- Order: Lepidoptera
- Family: Douglasiidae
- Genus: Tinagma
- Species: T. pulverilinea

Binomial name
- Tinagma pulverilinea Braun, 1921

Synonyms
- Tinagma pulverilineum; Tinagma leucaspis Braun, 1926

Moth species in family Douglasiidae

Tinagma pulverilinea is a moth in the family Douglasiidae. It is found in North America, where it has been recorded from Alberta, Montana and California.

The wingspan is 9–11 mm. The forewings are grey with a broad white bar. There is a broad dark transverse fascia just before the middle of the wing, bordered outwardly by a row of white scales. The hindwings are grey.
