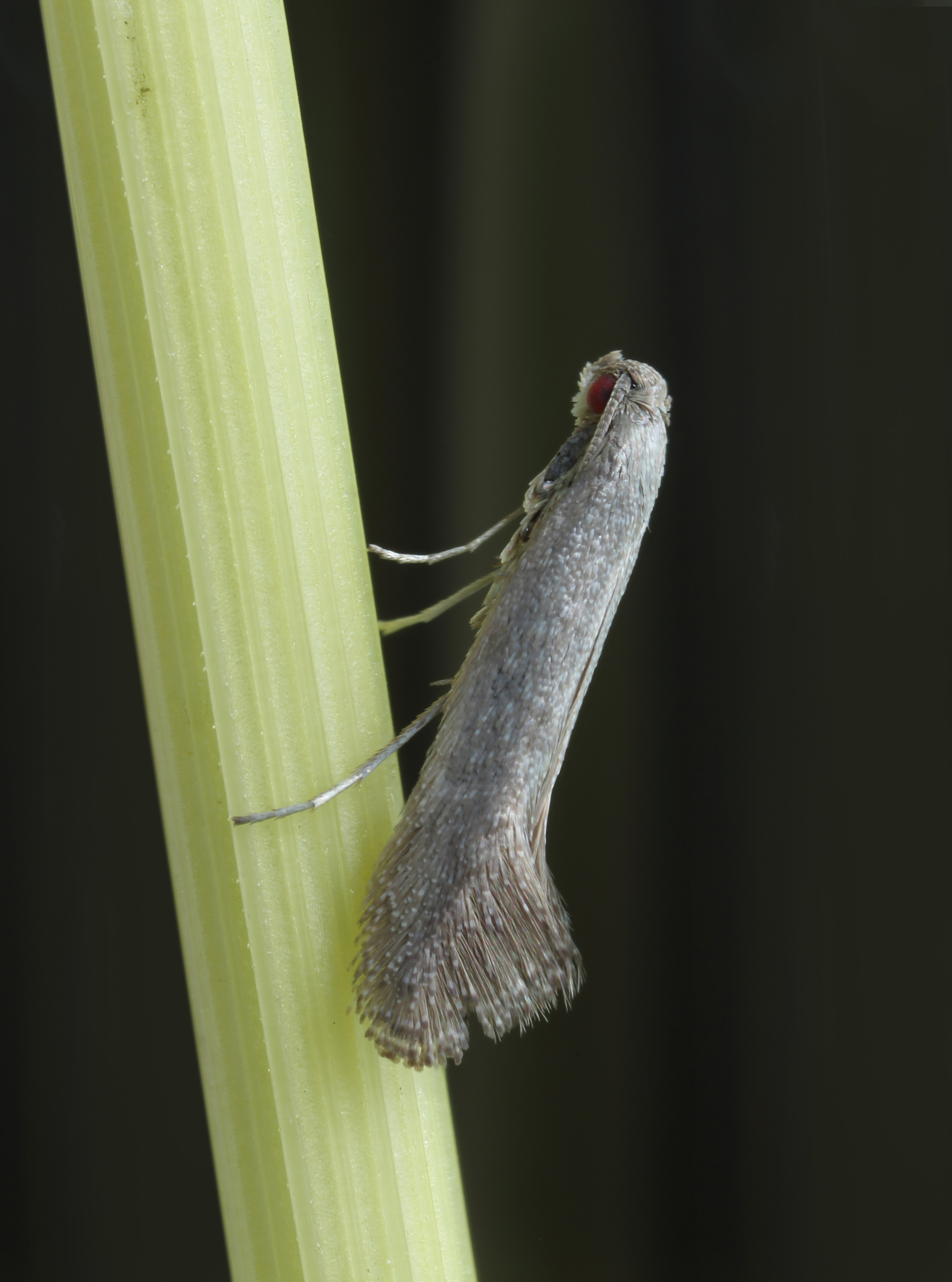

Scientific classification
- Domain: Eukaryota
- Kingdom: Animalia
- Phylum: Arthropoda
- Class: Insecta
- Order: Lepidoptera
- Family: Douglasiidae
- Genus: Tinagma
- Species: T. ocnerostomellum

Binomial name
- Tinagma ocnerostomellum (Stainton, 1850)

Synonyms
- Gracilaria ocnerostomella Stainton, 1850; Tinagma ocnerostomella; Tinagma echii Herrich-Schäffer, 1855

= Tinagma ocnerostomellum =

Bugloss spear wing

Moth species in family Douglasiidae

Tinagma ocnerostomellum, the bugloss spear wing, is a moth in the family Douglasiidae. It is found in Great Britain, Portugal, Spain, France, Belgium, the Netherlands, Germany, Denmark, Austria, Switzerland, Italy, the Czech Republic, Slovakia, Poland, Hungary, North Macedonia, Greece, Norway, Sweden, Finland, the Baltic region, Ukraine and on Sicily and Crete.

The wingspan is 8–9 mm. Adults are on wing in June and July. They are active during the day.

The larvae feed on Echium vulgare, from inside the stem.
