= Tinagma mongolicum =

Scientific classification
- Kingdom: Animalia
- Phylum: Arthropoda
- Clade: Pancrustacea
- Class: Insecta
- Order: Lepidoptera
- Family: Douglasiidae
- Genus: Tinagma
- Species: T. mongolicum

Binomial name
- Tinagma mongolicum Gaedike, 1991

Moth species in family Douglasiidae

Tinagma mongolicum is a moth in the Douglasiidae family. It is found in Transbaikalia, Mongolia and western Siberia.
