= Klimeschia afghanica =

Scientific classification
- Kingdom: Animalia
- Phylum: Arthropoda
- Clade: Pancrustacea
- Class: Insecta
- Order: Lepidoptera
- Family: Douglasiidae
- Genus: Klimeschia
- Species: K. afghanica

Binomial name
- Klimeschia afghanica Gaedike, 1974

Moth species in family Douglasiidae

Klimeschia afghanica is a moth in the family Douglasiidae. It was described by Reinhard Gaedike in 1974. It is found in Afghanistan, Iran and Tuva, Russia.
