= Tinagma gaedikei =

Scientific classification
- Domain: Eukaryota
- Kingdom: Animalia
- Phylum: Arthropoda
- Class: Insecta
- Order: Lepidoptera
- Family: Douglasiidae
- Genus: Tinagma
- Species: T. gaedikei

Binomial name
- Tinagma gaedikei Harrison, 2005

Moth species in family Douglasiidae

Tinagma gaedikei is a moth in the Douglasiidae family. It is found in North America, where it has been recorded from central Illinois and northern Kentucky.

Adults are on wing from late April to mid-May

The larvae feed on the fruit of Phacelia purshii. The species probably overwinters in the larval stage. Pupation takes place in mid-April of the second year.
