= Protonyctia =

Scientific classification
- Kingdom: Animalia
- Phylum: Arthropoda
- Class: Insecta
- Order: Lepidoptera
- Family: Douglasiidae
- Genus: Protonyctia; Meyrick, 1932
- Species: P. originalis

Binomial name
- Protonyctia originalis Meyrick, 1932

Monotypic moth genus in the family Douglasiidae

Protonyctia is a monotypic moth genus in the family Douglasiidae. Its only species, Protonyctia originalis, is found in Ecuador. Both the genus and species were first described by Edward Meyrick in 1932.
