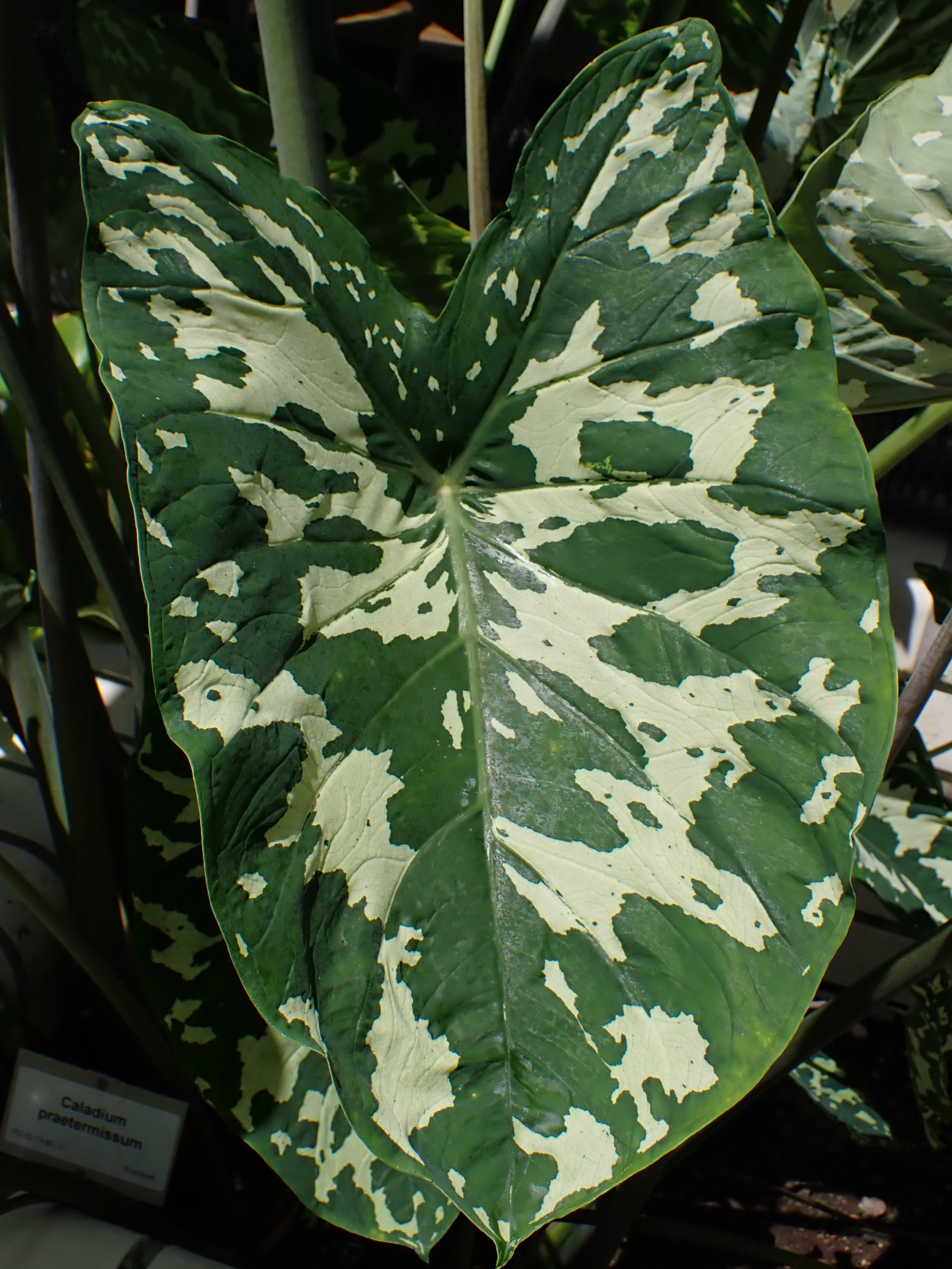
- At the Berlin Botanical Garden and Botanical Museum

Scientific classification
- Kingdom: Plantae
- Clade: Tracheophytes
- Clade: Angiosperms
- Clade: Monocots
- Order: Alismatales
- Family: Araceae
- Genus: Caladium
- Species: C. praetermissum

Binomial name
- Caladium praetermissum Bogner & Hett.

= Caladium praetermissum =

Species of plant

Caladium praetermissum, the Hilo beauty elephant ear, is a species of flowering plant in the family Araceae. Known only from cultivation, it is thought to be native to the New World Tropics. It is a tuberous geophyte reaching 1 m (3 ft), valued for its patterned leaves. Prior to its scientific description in 2009, it was sold as Alocasia 'Hilo Beauty'. Collected in 1981 at the Botanical Garden Munich-Nymphenburg, its specific epithet praetermissum means "overlooked" or "forgotten". It is available from commercial suppliers.
