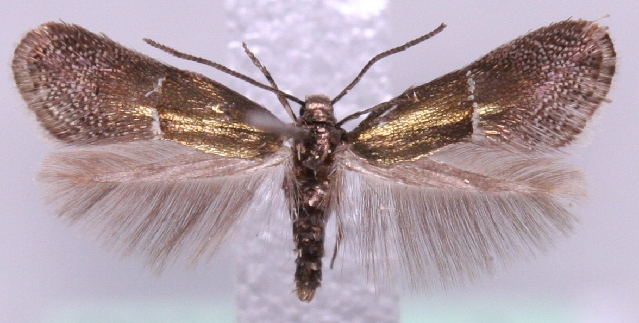
- Klimeschia transversella

Scientific classification
- Domain: Eukaryota
- Kingdom: Animalia
- Phylum: Arthropoda
- Class: Insecta
- Order: Lepidoptera
- Family: Douglasiidae
- Genus: Klimeschia; Amsel, 1938

= Klimeschia =

Moth genus in family Douglasiidae

Klimeschia is a genus of moths in the family Douglasiidae. It is found in the Palearctic realm.

== Species ==
- Klimeschia afghanica Gaedike, 1974
- Klimeschia lutumella Amsel, 1938
- Klimeschia paghmanella Gaedike, 1974
- Klimeschia thymetella (Staudinger, 1859)
- Klimeschia transversella (Zeller, 1839)
- Klimeschia vibratoriella (Mann, 1862)
