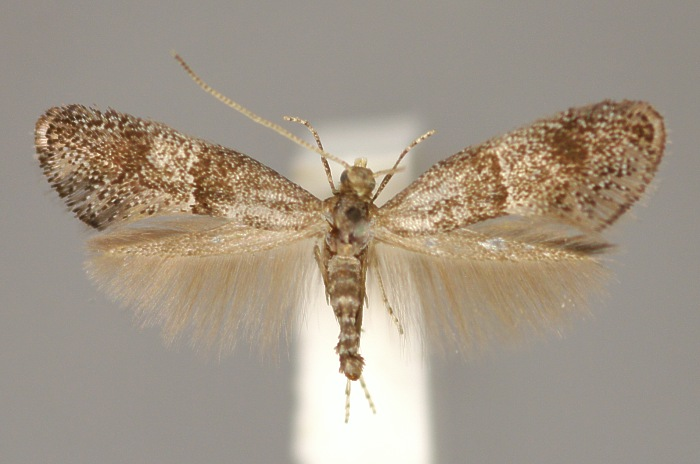

Scientific classification
- Domain: Eukaryota
- Kingdom: Animalia
- Phylum: Arthropoda
- Class: Insecta
- Order: Lepidoptera
- Family: Douglasiidae
- Genus: Tinagma
- Species: T. perdicella

Binomial name
- Tinagma perdicella Zeller, 1839

Synonyms
- Tinagma perdicella var. matutinella Zeller, 1872; Tinagma deliciosella Caradja, 1920

= Tinagma perdicella =

Moth species in family Douglasiidae

Tinagma perdicella is a moth in the family Douglasiidae. It is found in the Netherlands, Belgium, France, Germany, Switzerland, Austria, Italy, Spain, Poland, Albania, Serbia, Croatia, the Czech Republic, Slovakia, North Macedonia, Romania, Norway, Sweden, Finland, the Baltic region, Belarus, Ukraine and Russia.

The wingspan is 8–12 mm. Adults have been recorded on wing from May to June.

The larvae feed on Fragaria vesca and possibly Potentilla and Rubus species.
