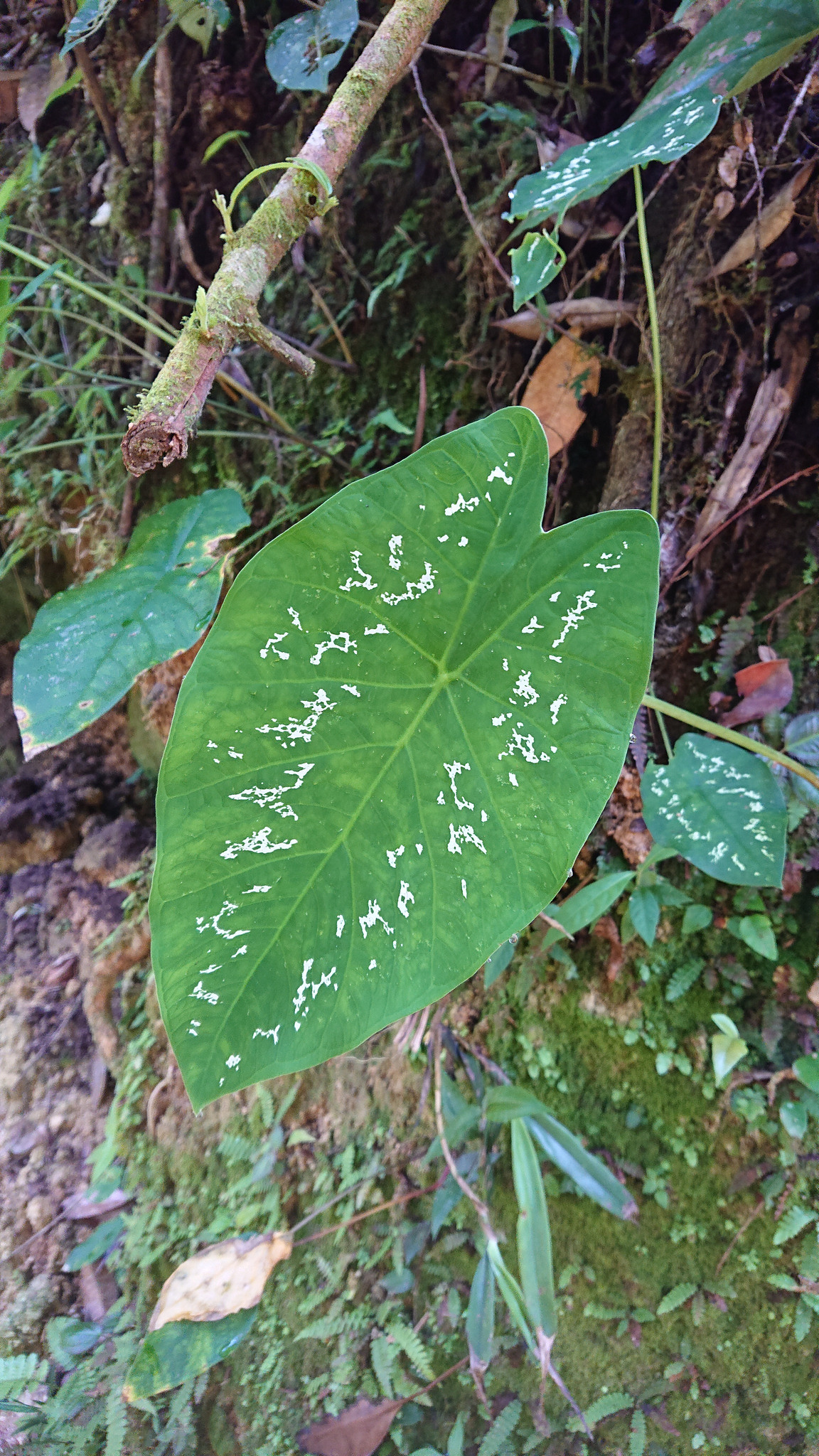

Scientific classification
- Kingdom: Plantae
- Clade: Tracheophytes
- Clade: Angiosperms
- Clade: Monocots
- Order: Alismatales
- Family: Araceae
- Genus: Caladium
- Species: C. steudnerifolium

Binomial name
- Caladium steudnerifolium Engl.

= Caladium steudnerifolium =

Species of flowering plant

Caladium steudnerifolium is a species of flowering plant within the family Araceae.

== Description ==
Caladium steudnerifolium exhibits polymorphism, with two colour morphs: one with green leaves and one with variegated leaves.

== Distribution and habitat ==
Caladium steudnerifolium is native to Western South America, where it can be found within the countries of Bolivia, Colombia, Ecuador and Peru. This plant species grows in the understorey of submontane rainforests.

== Ecology ==
The two leaf morphs of Caladium steudnerifolium exhibit different ecological trade-offs. The green leaf morph contains more chloroplast therefore plants can photosythesize more efficiently, however these individuals are significantly more likely to be attacked by leaf miners. The pattern on the variegated leaf morph however strongly mimics leaf miner damage, therefore tricking and detering adult leaf mining moths from deposting their eggs as they believe the leaf has already been damaged by another leaf mining larva.
