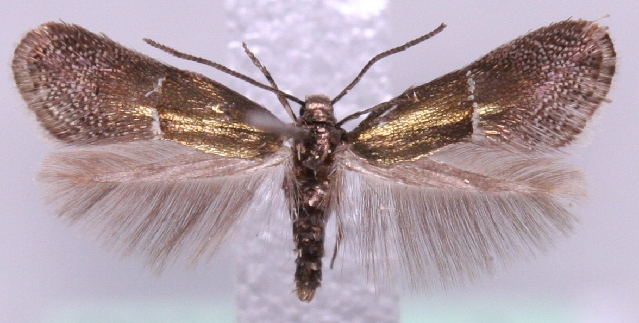

Scientific classification
- Domain: Eukaryota
- Kingdom: Animalia
- Phylum: Arthropoda
- Class: Insecta
- Order: Lepidoptera
- Family: Douglasiidae
- Genus: Klimeschia
- Species: K. transversella

Binomial name
- Klimeschia transversella (Zeller, 1839)

Synonyms
- Tinagma transversella Zeller, 1839; Klimeschia unicolorella Milliére

= Klimeschia transversella =

Moth species in family Douglasiidae

Klimeschia transversella is a moth in the family Douglasiidae. It was described by Zeller in 1839. It is found in Spain, Portugal, Italy, France, Belgium, Germany, Poland, Denmark, Austria, the Czech Republic, Slovakia, Croatia, Bosnia and Herzegovina, Hungary, Romania, North Macedonia, Greece, Finland, Sweden, Belarus, the Baltic region and Russia.

The wingspan is 6–8 mm. Adults are on wing from mid to the end of June.

The larvae feed on Thymus species.
