= Phyllotaenium lindenii 'Magnificum' =

Flowering plant cultivar

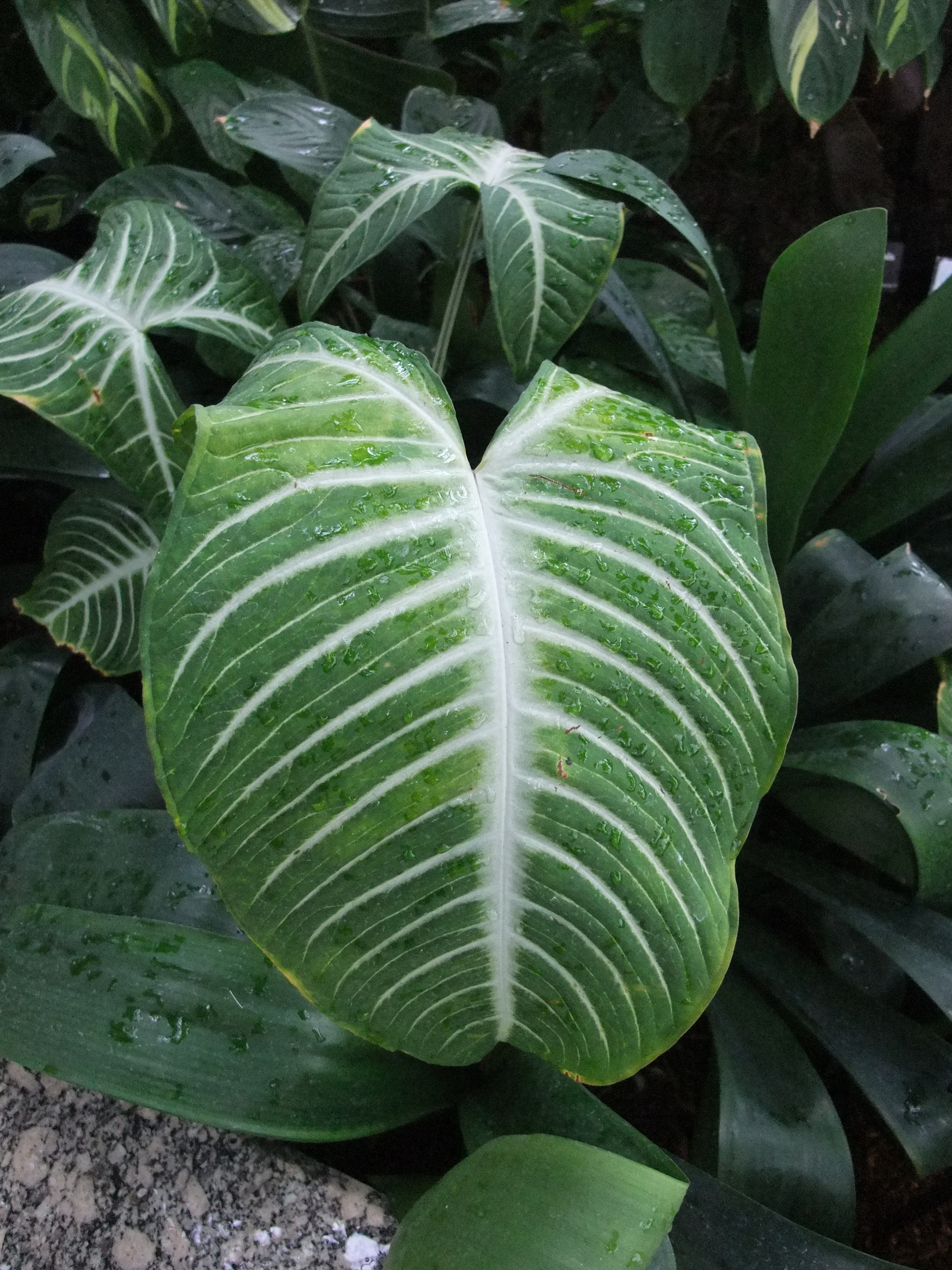
- Species: Phyllotaenium lindenii
- Cultivar: 'Magnificum'

Phyllotaenium lindenii var. lindenii 'Magnificum', also found in cultivation under Caladium lindenii 'Magnificum' or Xanthosoma lindenii 'Magnificum', is a cultivar of the species Phyllotaenium lindenii. It is differentiated from the species by having more pronounced veins on the leaves that are a creamy white coloration. The cultivar grows from a rhizome and is commonly grown as an ornamental plant.
