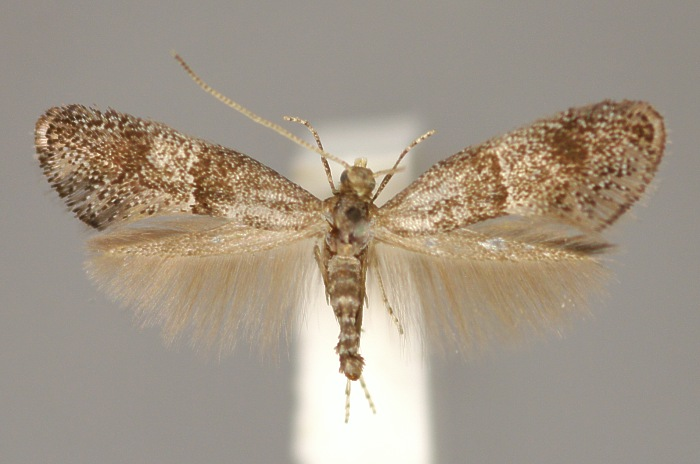
- Tinagma perdicella

Scientific classification
- Kingdom: Animalia
- Phylum: Arthropoda
- Clade: Pancrustacea
- Class: Insecta
- Order: Lepidoptera
- Family: Douglasiidae
- Genus: Tinagma; Zeller, 1839

Synonyms
- Douglasia Stainton, 1854

= Tinagma =

Moth genus in family Douglasiidae

Tinagma is a genus of moths in the family Douglasiidae. It is primarily found in the Palearctic and Nearctic realms

== Species ==
- Tinagma anchusella Benander, 1936
- Tinagma balteolella (Fischer von Roslerstamm, 1840)
- Tinagma bledella
- Tinagma brunneofasciatum Gaedike, 1990
- Tinagma californicum Gaedike, 1990
- Tinagma columbella
- Tinagma dryadis Staudinger, 1872
- Tinagma giganteum Braun, 1921
- Tinagma gaedikei Harrison, 2005
- Tinagma grisecens
- Tinagma hedemanni Caradja, 1920
- Tinagma klimeschi Gaedike, 1991
- Tinagma leucanthes Meyrick, 1897
- Tinagma mexicanum Gaedike, 1990
- Tinagma minutissima Staudinger, 1880
- Tinagma mongolicum Gaedike, 1991
- Tinagma obscurofasciella (Chambers, 1881)
- Tinagma ochremaculella (Chambers, 1875)
- Tinagma ocnerostomellum (Stainton, 1850)
- Tinagma perdicella (Zeller, 1839)
- Tinagma powelli Gaedike, 1990
- Tinagma pulverilinea Braun, 1921
- Tinagma signatum Gaedike, 1991
