= Leaf miner =

Larva of an insect that lives in and eats the leaf tissue of plants

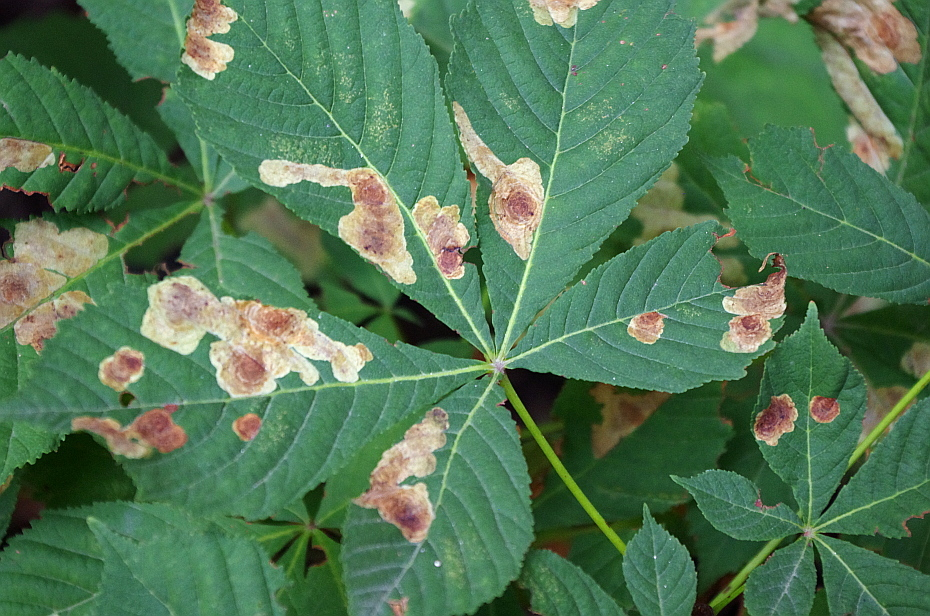
Leaf miner damage to a horse chestnut tree

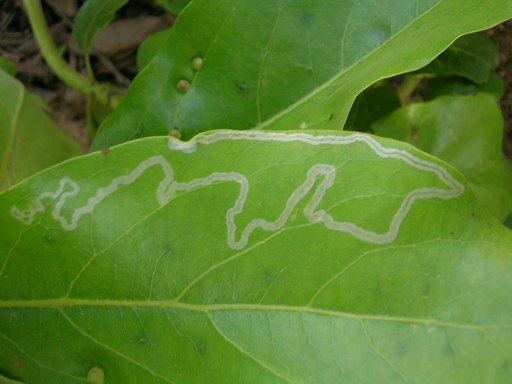
Leaf with minor miner damage

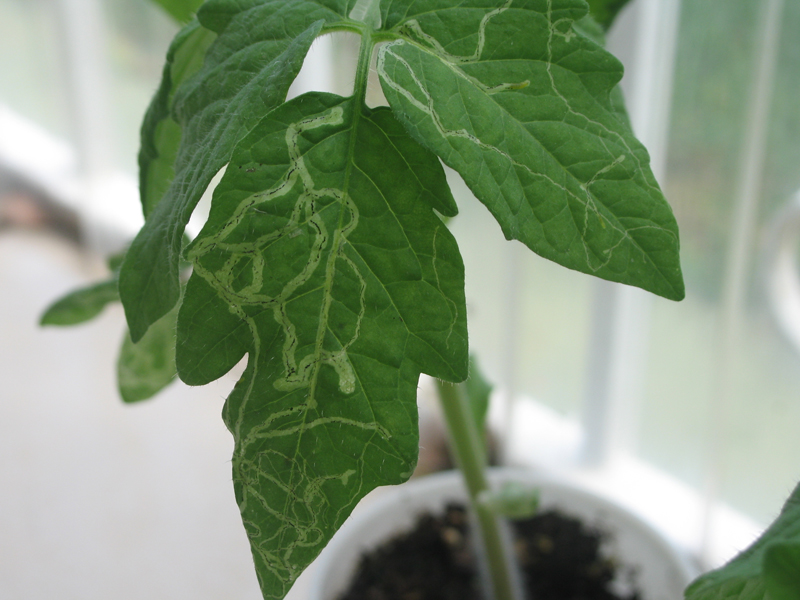
Tomato with leaf miner damage

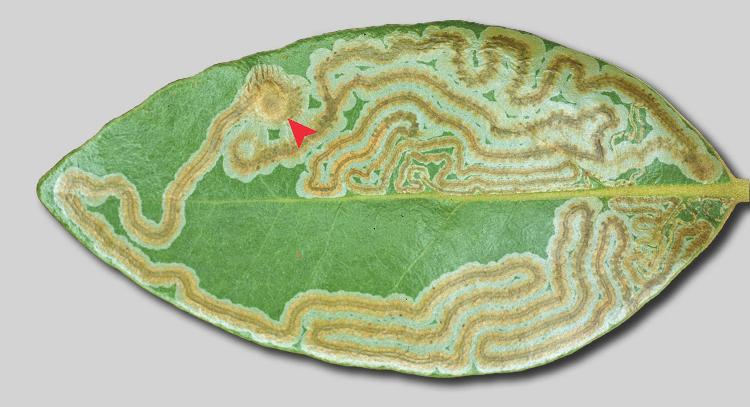
Leaf mines by the moth Phyllocnistis hyperpersea on a Persea borbonia leaf. The red arrow indicates the pupal crypt.

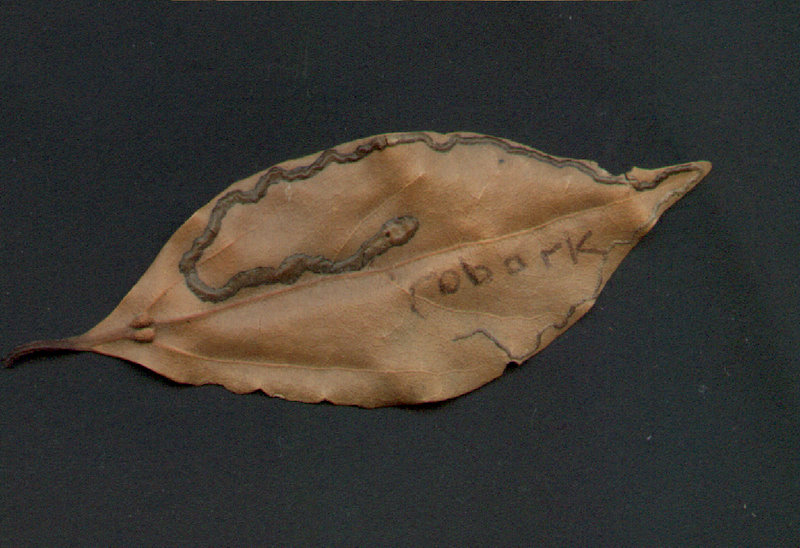
Leaf miner trail on a fallen leaf in a Gondwana cool temperate rainforest. Note the initial thin width of the insect trail, becoming wider as the insect grows while it navigates around the leaf. Cryptocarya foveolata from Cobark Park, Barrington Tops, Australia

A leaf miner is a larval stage of various insect species that live and feed within the tissues of a plant's leaves. The term does not describe a single taxonomic group, but rather a feeding behavior known as "leaf mining" that has evolved independently across several insect orders. Leaf miners are considered both ecologically significant and economically important because of their role in ecosystems and their impact on agriculture and horticulture. Leaf miners consume the inner tissues of leaves while leaving the outer epidermal layers largely intact. This results in distinctive patterns or "mines" on the leaves, which can appear as winding trails, blotches, or tunnels. Leaf mining is an ancient ecological strategy that has been employed by insect larvae since at least the beginning of the Permian period, around 295 million years ago.

== Taxonomy ==
Leaf mining behavior is observed in multiple insect groups, including:

- Lepidoptera (moths)
- Diptera (flies, especially Agromyzidae)
- Hymenoptera (specifically sawflies)
- Coleoptera (beetles)

Each group contains numerous species with larvae that are specialized for leaf-mining on their preferred host plants.

== Life cycle ==
Adult leaf mining insects typically lay eggs on or within the surface of a host plant's leaf. When the larvae hatch, they burrow into the leaf and begin feeding between the epidermal layers. Much like woodboring beetles, leaf miners are protected from many predators while feeding within the tissues of the leaves, selectively eating only the layers that have the least cellulose. After completing larval development, the insect pupates either inside the mine, on the leaf surface or within the soil below the host plant depending on the species. Emerging adult insects can then continue their cycle.

== Plant defenses ==
Plants have developed a variety of defense strategies to reduce damage from leaf miners. These defenses can be structural, chemical, or physiological and may act either directly against the larvae or indirectly by attracting natural enemies.

=== Structural defenses ===
- Leaf toughness and thickness: Some species of leaf mining insect will only lay eggs on the younger leaves of its specific host plant. The older and larger leaves of orange trees such as Citrus × sinensis can resist infestation from the citrus leaf miner (Phyllocnistis citrella), however the younger thinner leaves are highly susceptible.
- Trichomes (leaf hairs): Plants that possess trichomes on their leaves have been found to deter leaf miners. The plant species Solanum pennellii possesses leaves covered in tiny hairs, which make it resistant to the leaf mining fly Liriomyza trifollii. The cultivated tomato (Solanum lycopersicum) however doesn't possess as many trichomes therefore is much more suscpectible to the leaf miner.
- Leaf variegation: Plants can sometimes evolve to use leaf variegation in order to mimic leaf miner damage, this then makes the plant less appealing to leaf mining insects that seek a healthy host plant to desposit their eggs. It is believed that some patterns of leaf variegation are adaptations used by plants to deceive adult leaf miners into mistaking the variegated leaf as one that is already hosting a larval leaf miner. The plant species Caladium steudnerifolium can possess individuals with leaves that exhibit variegation that strongly resembles the leaf damage caused by the larvae of leaf miners. Infestations of leaf miner were found to be significantly higher in C. steudnerifolium leaves that lacked variegatation.

=== Chemical defenses ===
- Tannins: Plants will use a variety of organic polyphenolic compounds such as tannins to poison and deter insect herbivores. Leaves containing high tannin levels have been found to cause leaf mining Cameraria to become more susceptible to parasitism from parasitic species of Hymenoptera. High tannin levels within consumed leaves were also found to affect the development of larva by causing a decrease in weight in the developing pupa.
- Saponins: Tree species such as the Red buckeye (Aesculus pavia) produces saponins within its leaves to aid leaf resistance against the larvae of the Horse Chestnut Leafminer (Cameraria ohridella).

=== Physiological responses ===
- Leaf abscission: Some plants can shed their leaves when affected by leaf miners in a process known as abscission. The arroyo willow (Salix lasiolepis) will often release leaves that contain the larva of leaf mining Phyllonorycter species. This process has been found to greatly reduce the survival rates of Phyllonorycter larva within the abscised leaves.

== Identification ==
The pattern of the feeding tunnel and the layer of the leaf being mined is often diagnostic of the insect responsible, sometimes even to species level. The mine often contains frass, or droppings, and the pattern of frass deposition, mine shape, and host plant identity are useful to determine the species and instar of the leaf miner. Some mining insects feed in other parts of a plant, such as the surface of a fruit or the petal of a flower.

== Relationship with humans ==
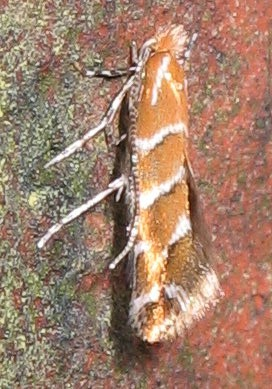
Horse-chestnut leaf miner (adult)

Leaf miners are regarded as pests by many farmers and gardeners as they can cause damage to agricultural crops and garden plants, and can be difficult to control with insecticide sprays as they are protected inside the plant's leaves. Spraying the infected plants with spinosad, an organic insecticide, can control some leaf miners. Spinosad does not kill on contact and must be ingested by the leaf miner. Two or three applications may be required in a season. However, this will have harmful ecological effects, especially if sprayed when bees or other beneficial arthropods are present.

Leaf miner infection of crops can be reduced or prevented by planting trap crops near the plants to be protected. For example, lambsquarter and columbine will distract leaf miners, drawing them to those plants and therefore reducing the incidence of attack on nearby crops. This is a method of companion planting.

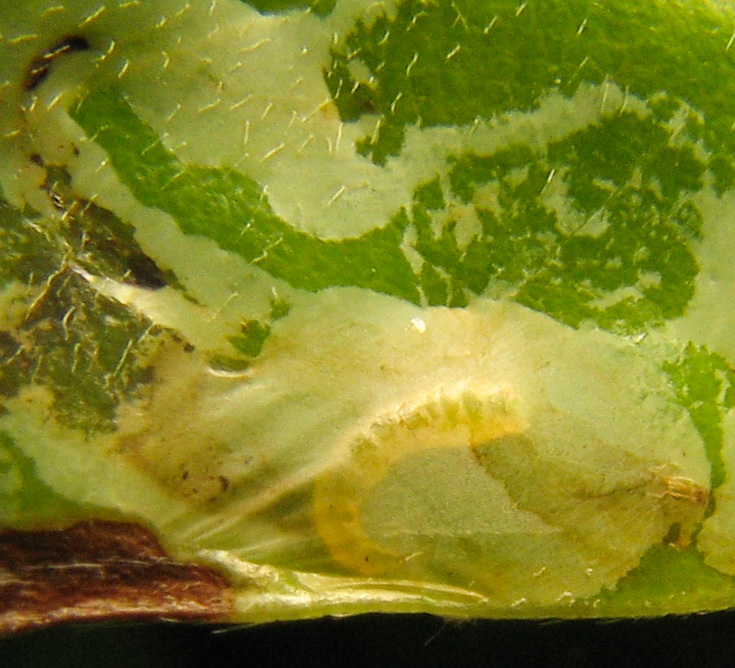
Phyllocnistis magnoliella in magnolia leaf.

Some leaf miners are known to cause outbreaks due to population spikes. These outbreaks can defoliate a large amount of plants within a short time period, damaging crops and forest plantations, as well as altering the local ecosystems and nutrient availability.

== See also ==
- Agromyzidae (leaf miner flies)
- Pegomya hyoscyami (spinach/beet leaf miner)
- Douglasiidae (including Tinagma, the largest genus of Douglasiidae)
- Gracillariidae
- Liriomyza sativae (vegetable leaf miner)
- Liriomyza trifolii (American serpentine leaf miner)
- Malacosoma ('tent caterpillars')
- Nepticulidae
- Horse-chestnut leaf miner (Cameraria ohridella)
- Tenthredinidae (some species)
- Tischerioidea (trumpet leaf-miner moths)
- Folivore
