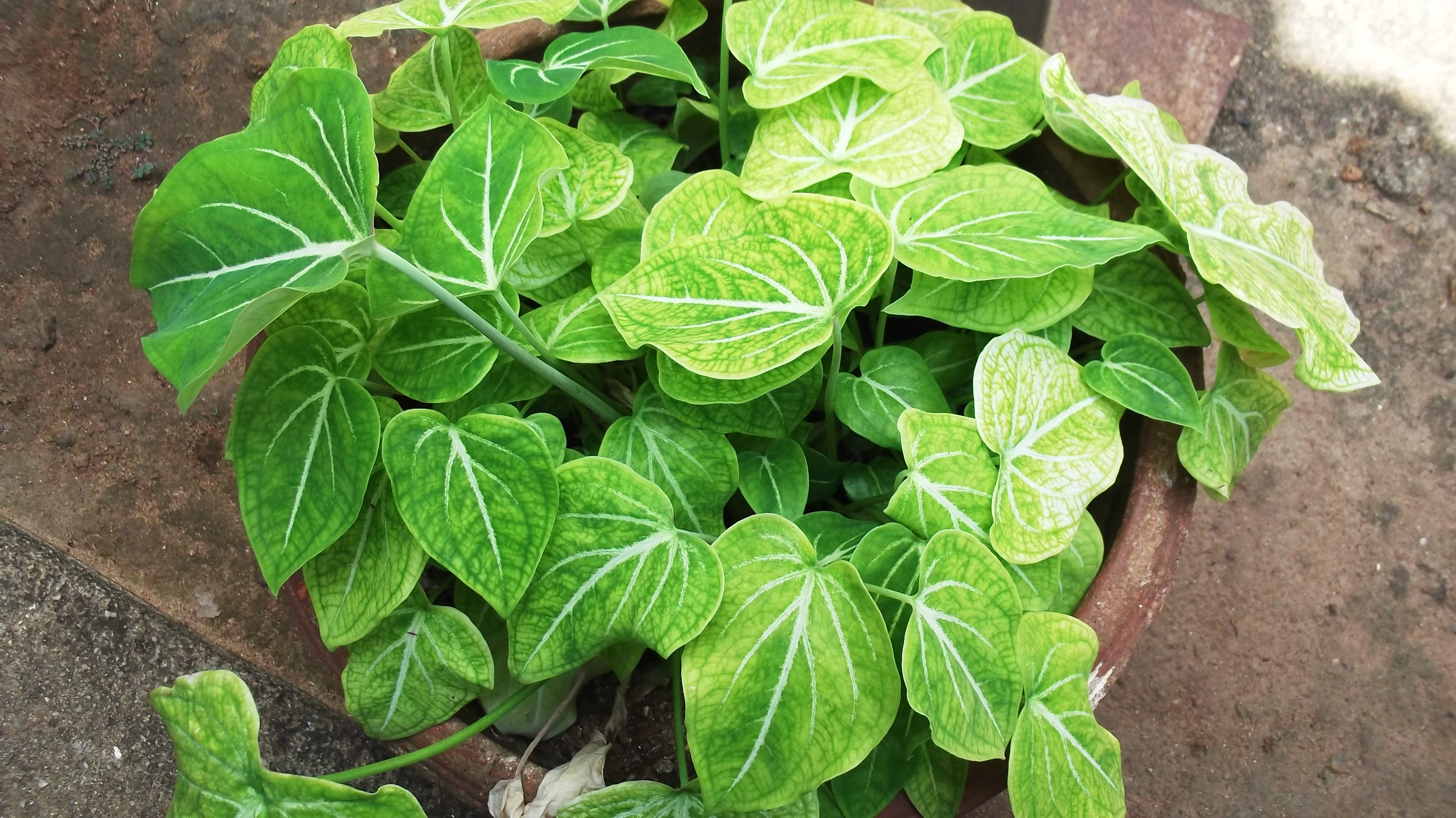
- Caladium schomburgkii

Scientific classification
- Kingdom: Plantae
- Clade: Embryophytes
- Clade: Tracheophytes
- Clade: Angiosperms
- Clade: Monocots
- Order: Alismatales
- Family: Araceae
- Subfamily: Aroideae
- Tribe: Caladieae
- Genus: Caladium; Vent. (1800), nom. cons.

Species
- 19; see text
- Range of the genus Caladium

Synonyms
- Aphyllarum S.Moore (1895)

= Caladium =

Genus of flowering plants

Caladium (/kəˈleɪdiəm/) is a genus of flowering plants in the family Araceae. They are often known by the common name elephant ear (which they share with the closely related genera Alocasia, Colocasia, and Xanthosoma), heart of Jesus, and angel wings. There are over 1000 named cultivars of Caladium bicolor from the original South American plant.

The genus Caladium includes seven species that are native to South America and Central America, and naturalized in India, parts of Africa, and various tropical islands. They grow in open areas of the forest and on the banks of rivers and go dormant during the dry season. The wild plants grow to 15–35 inches (40–90 cm) tall, with leaves mostly 6-18 inches (15–45 cm) long and broad.

== Name ==
From Malay Keladi, which refers to a few genera within the Araceae family (Alocasia, Caladium and Dieffenbachia). However, it may just specifically refer to the Colocasia genus.

== Species ==
Many names have been proposed for species and varieties in the genus, but the vast majority of the names have either been transferred to other genera or regarded as synonyms of other names. The following are accepted.

- Caladium amazonicum E.G.Gonç. – Pará state northern Brazil
- Caladium andreanum Bogner - Colombia
- Caladium bicolor (Aiton) Vent. - widespread from Costa Rica to northern Argentina; naturalized in India, Bangladesh, western and central Africa, and various islands in the Indian and Pacific Oceans and in the Caribbean
- Caladium clavatum Hett., Bogner & J.Boos - Napo region of Ecuador
- Caladium coerulescens G.S.Bunting - Venezuela
- Caladium cortesiae Croat & E.G.Gonç. – Colombia
- Caladium humboldtii (Raf.) Schott - Guyana, Amazonas State of southern Venezuela, Amazonas State of western Brazil, Loreto region of eastern Peru
- Caladium intermedium E.G.Gonç. – Tocantins state of northern Brazil
- Caladium macrotites Schott - Colombia, Venezuela, northwestern Brazil
- Caladium palaciosii Croat & L.P.Hannon – Ecuador and Peru
- Caladium picturatum K.Koch & C.D.Bouché - Venezuela, northwestern Brazil
- Caladium praetermissum Bogner & Hett. - range unknown
- Caladium schomburgkii Schott - Venezuela, northwestern Brazil, the Guianas
- Caladium smaragdinum K.Koch & C.D.Bouché - Venezuela
- Caladium steudnerifolium Engl. – western South America (Colombia to Bolivia)
- Caladium stevensonii Croat & Delannay – Colombia
- Caladium steyermarkii G.S.Bunting - Venezuela
- Caladium ternatum Madison - Colombia, Amazonas State of western Brazil
- Caladium tuberosum (S.Moore) Bogner & Mayo - Mato Grosso

=== Formerly placed here ===
- Phyllotaenium lindenii André (1872) (as Caladium lindenii (André) Madison)

== Cultivation and uses ==
Several species are grown as ornamental plants for their large, arrowhead-shaped leaves marked in varying patterns in white, pink, and red (somewhat resembling the unrelated coleus) and have been in cultivation in Europe since the late 18th century. The two forms most widely cultivated are called "fancy-leaved" and "lance-leaved". The former is the more commonly seen and is the traditional caladium of cultivation; the leaves are more heart-shaped. The latter has more lance-head-shaped leaves. Most Caladiums in cultivation grow to about 24 inches (60 cm) high and 24 inches (60 cm) wide, although dwarf varieties are now in cultivation.

Numerous cultivars have been selected, most of them derived from C. bicolor. Many are sold as C. × hortulanem, a synonym for C. bicolor. The lance-leaved varieties are also derived from C. schomburgkii.

Caladiums grow from tubers and can be propagated by dividing the tubers. They are hardy only to USDA plant hardiness zone 10; in colder areas, they are typically grown as tender "bulbs" or as houseplants.

During their growing season, they require moderate watering (damp, not soggy). Most varieties prefer partial to full shade, although sun-resistant varieties are now in cultivation. Approximately 98% of the world's caladium bulbs are from Lake Placid, Florida, in the United States. In recent years, many new varieties have become available through breeding and are now largely disease resistant. The bulk of "bulb" production is sold to pot producers, who in turn provide local nursery outlets with potted caladiums ready for immediate planting. Most "bulb" growers also sell direct retail via websites, shipping of "bulbs" takes place in the spring when temperatures permit ("bulbs" are subject to damage if temperatures are too low).

In temperate areas, they should be lifted before the first frost. The tubers are dried and stored for the winter when temperatures fall to 65 °F (18 °C), and stored moderately dry (not bone-dry) over the winter at temperatures between 56 °F (13 °C) and 61 °F (16 °C).

All parts of the plant are poisonous. They should not be ingested and may irritate sensitive skin.

=== Public displays ===
An annual festival is held during the last weekend of July in Lake Placid, Florida, home to a majority of the world's caladium fields. A popular activity is a tour of the fields of caladiums, the product of local growers. Every July since 2003, Gaylord Palms Resort & Convention Center in Kissimmee, Florida, has presented the Florida Caladium Showcase, a large indoor and outdoor display of the plants, including new varieties. In addition, Classic Caladiums of Avon Park, Florida, holds an annual early September Open House caladium garden of over 2 acres in addition to farm tours. Many universities feature caladiums at field trials, you may also find displays at arboretums and many public gardens.

Caladiums are tubers, not corms or bulbs. A corm is a compressed mass of stem tissue with a basal plate (root tissue) at the bottom and one or more "eyes" on top from which vegetative growth and flowers will appear. A tuber is stem tissue with various eyes which may grow vegetative growth or roots.

=== Caladium drooping ===
They prefer a moderate shady place with indirect sunlight, high humidity, and a well-structured watering schedule.

Caladium is a tropical plant native to the tropical Americas. It is intolerant to low temperature or prolonged absence of water. After a while without water, Caladium leaves will go dormant and droop.

== Gallery ==
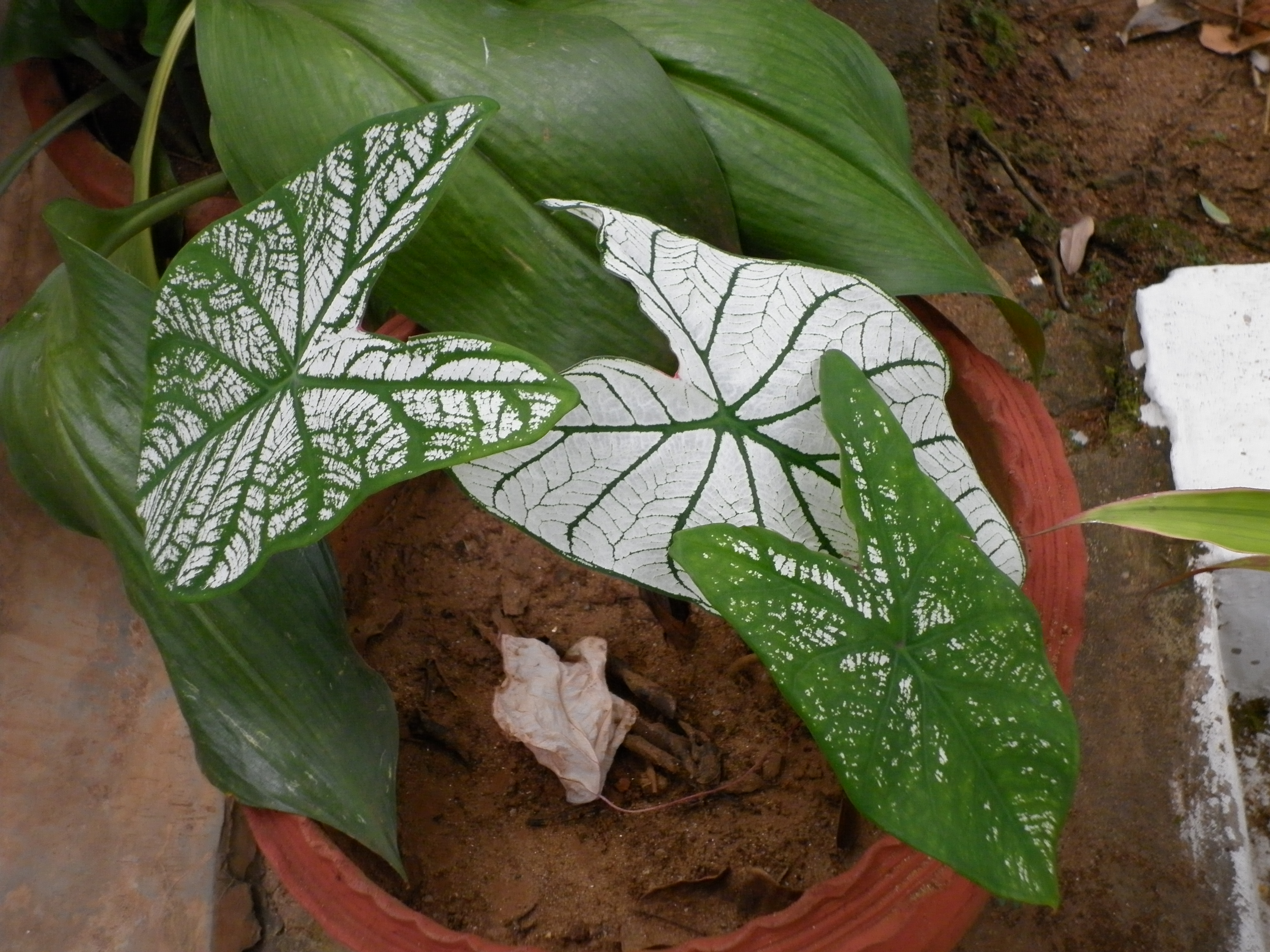
Caladium with white leaf and green veins at Courtallam

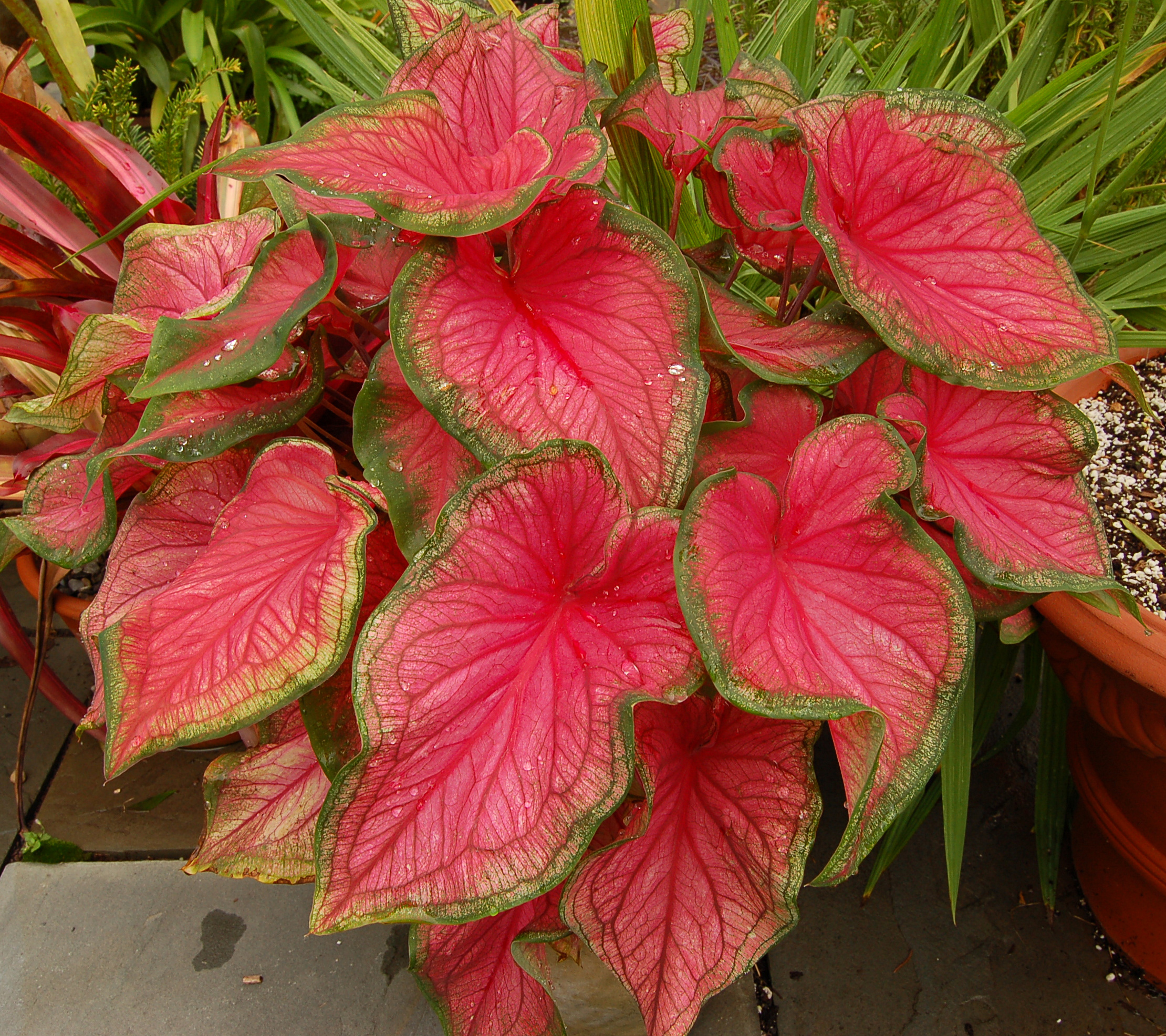
Plant canopy (Caladium bicolor 'Florida Sweetheart')

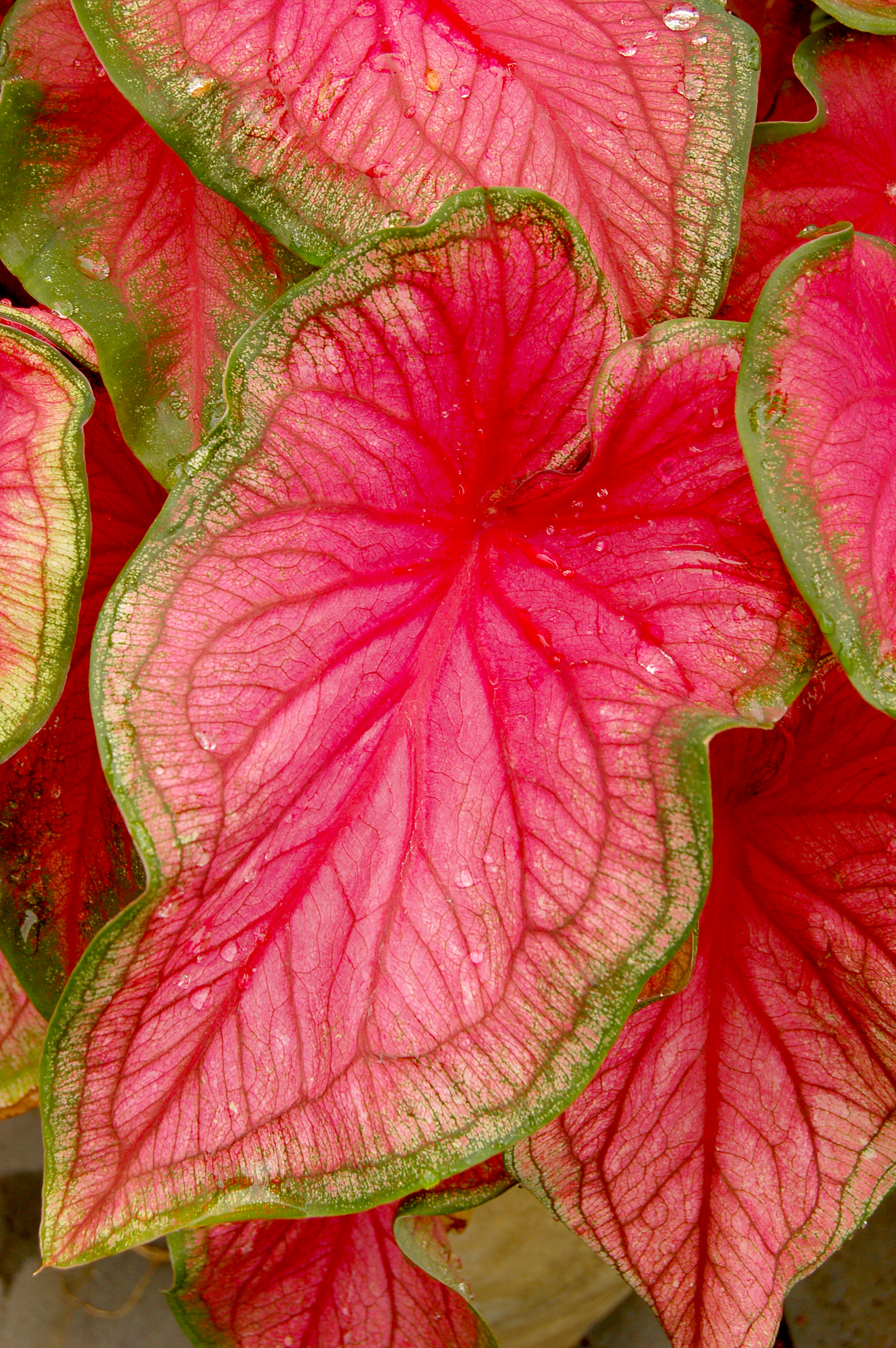
Leaf closeup (Caladium bicolor 'Florida Sweetheart')

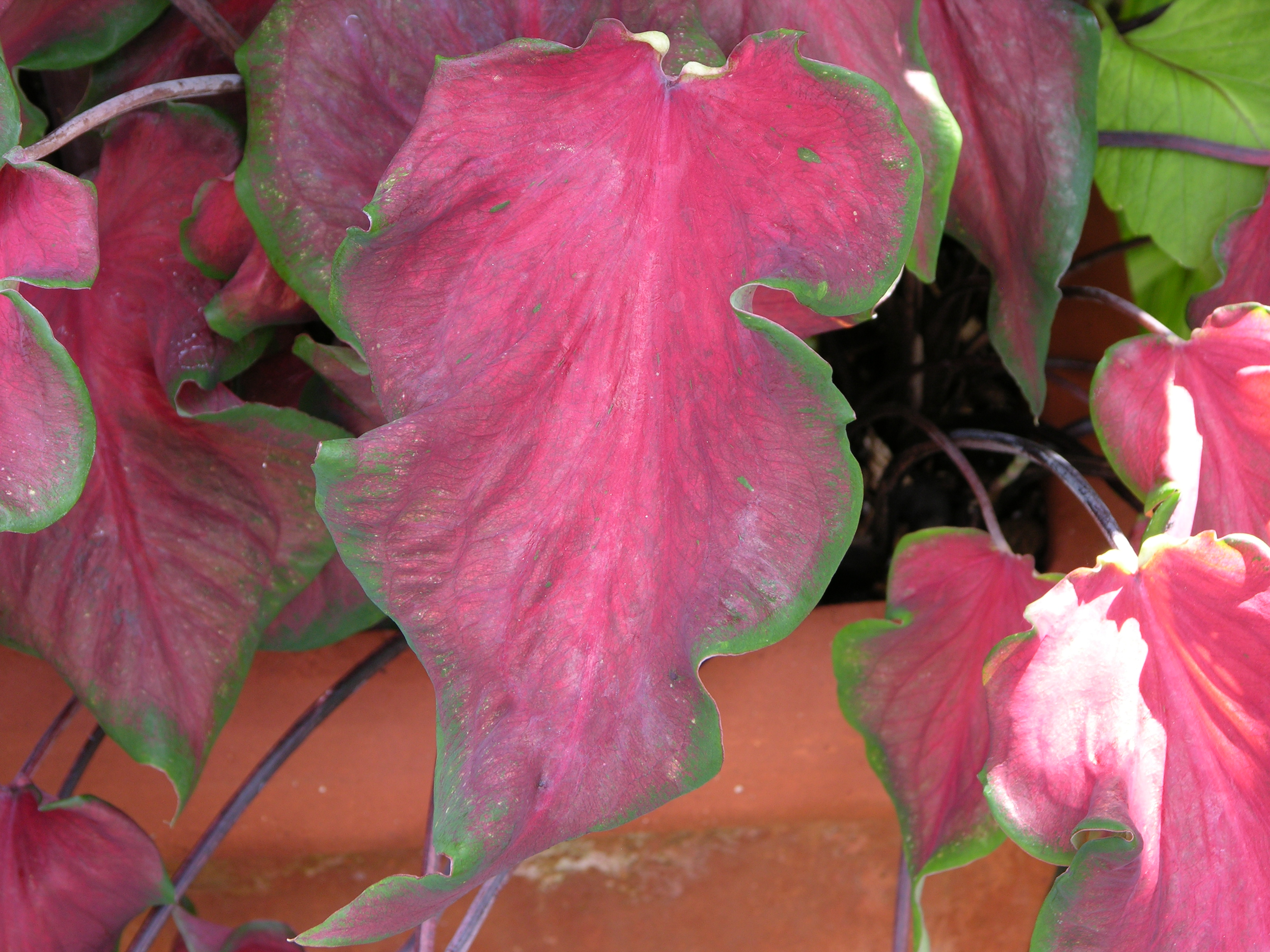
Caladium bicolor 'Florida Red Ruffles'

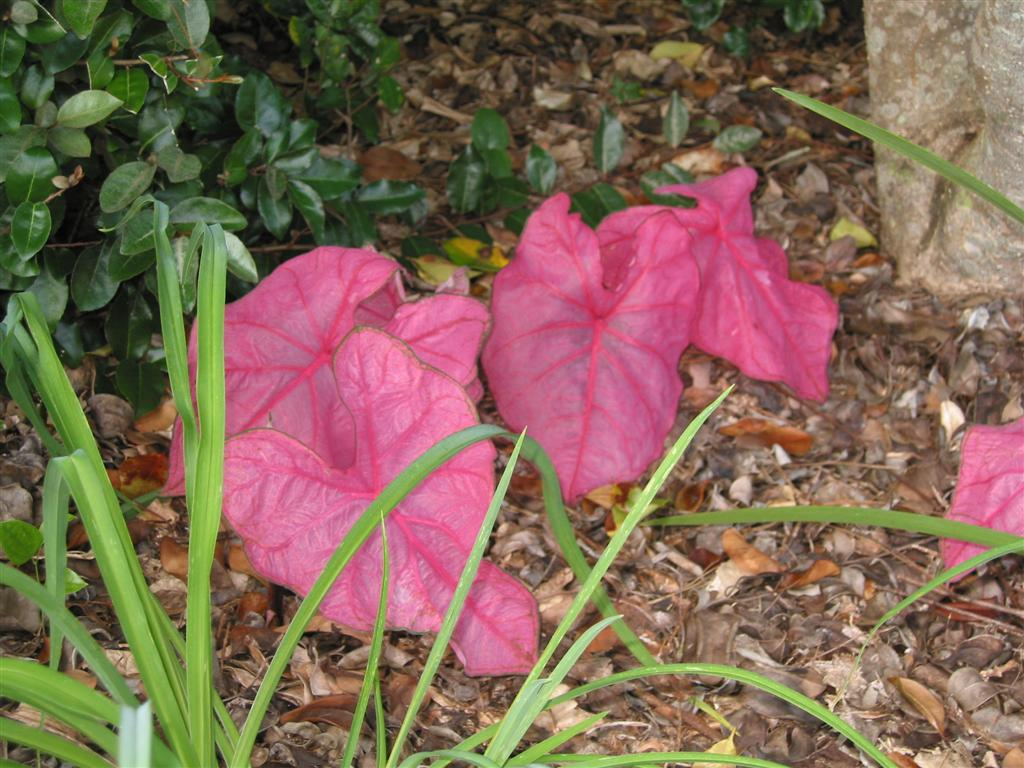
Caladium Fannie Munson

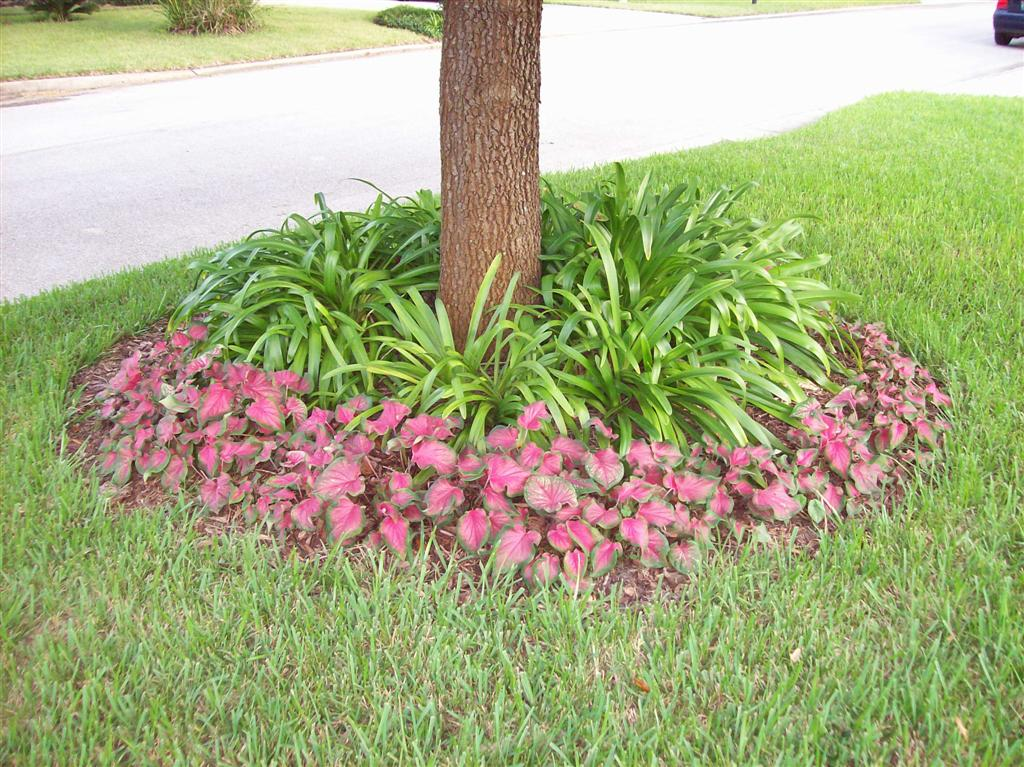
Bedding of Caladium Florida Sweetheart
