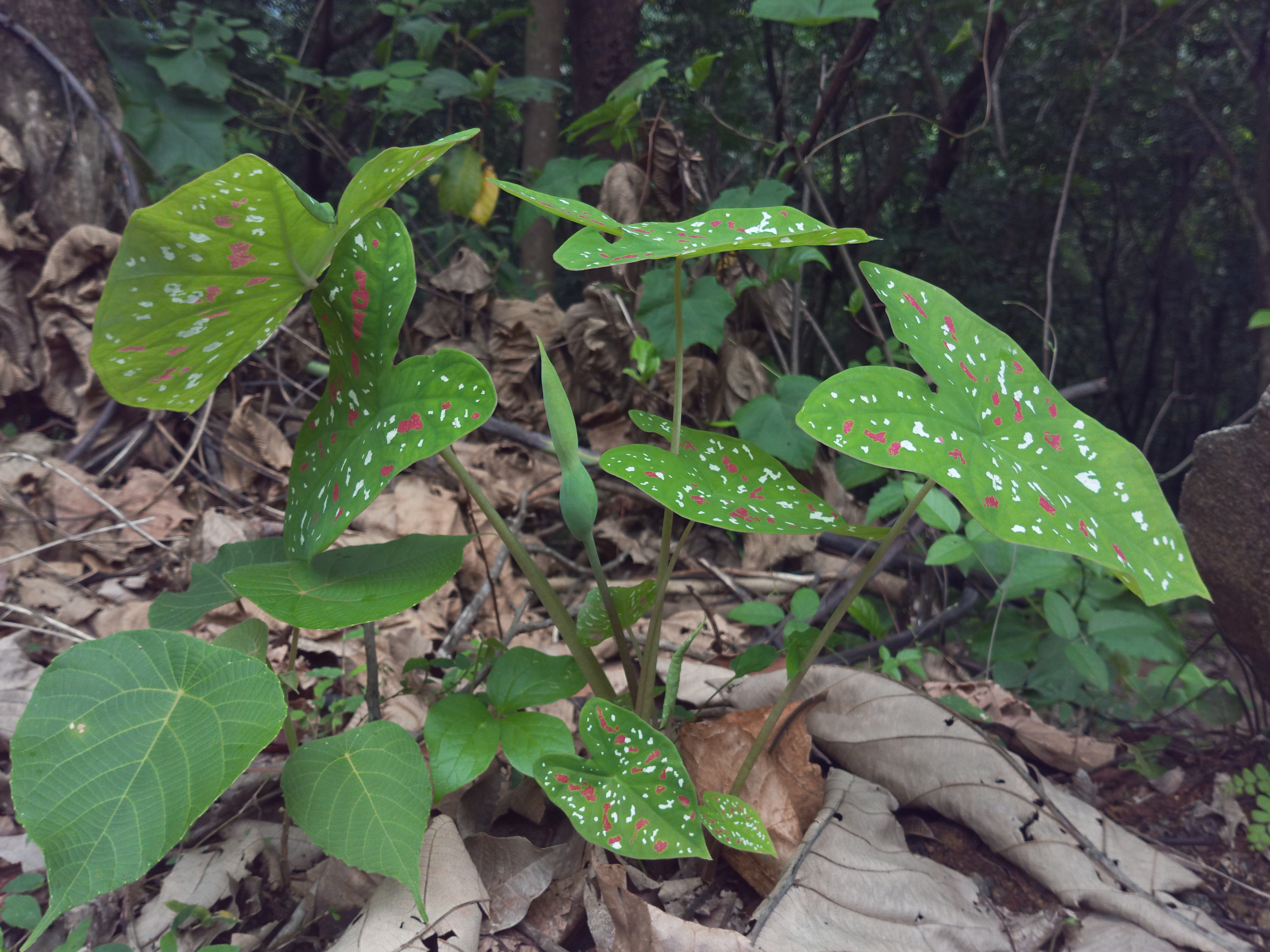

Scientific classification
- Kingdom: Plantae
- Clade: Tracheophytes
- Clade: Angiosperms
- Clade: Monocots
- Order: Alismatales
- Family: Araceae
- Subfamily: Aroideae
- Tribe: Caladieae
- Genus: Caladium
- Species: C. bicolor

Binomial name
- Caladium bicolor (Aiton) Vent.

Synonyms
- List: Alocasia rex N.E.Br. [Invalid]; Alocasia roezlii N.E.Br.; Arum bicolor Aiton; Arum pellucidum Fulchir ex Kunth [Invalid]; Arum pulchrum Salisb.; Arum vermitoxicum Vell.; Arum vermitoxicum Vell. ex Kunth; Caladium albopunctatissimum Jacob-Makoy ex H.Karst.; Caladium amoenum Engl.; Caladium appunianum Engl. [Invalid]; Caladium argyrospilum Lem.; Caladium barraquinii Hérincq; Caladium barraquinii Lem.; Caladium bicolor var. albomaculatum Engl.; Caladium bicolor var. argyrospilum (Lem.) Engl.; Caladium bicolor f. argyrospilum (Lem.) Engl.; Caladium bicolor f. argyrospilum (Lem.) Vent.; Caladium bicolor var. barraquinii (Hérincq) Engl.; Caladium bicolor f. barraquinii (Hérincq) Engl.; Caladium bicolor var. bohemicum Engl.; Caladium bicolor var. brongniartii (Lem.) Engl.; Caladium bicolor f. brongniartii (Lem.) Engl.; Caladium bicolor f. brongniartii (Lem.) Vent.; Caladium bicolor var. chantinii (Lem.) Engl.; Caladium bicolor f. chantinii (Lem.) Engl.; Caladium bicolor f. chantinii (Lem.) Vent.; Caladium bicolor var. curwadlii Engl.; Caladium bicolor var. devosianum (Lem.) Engl.; Caladium bicolor f. devosianum (Lem.) Engl.; Caladium bicolor f. devosianum (Lem.) Vent.; Caladium bicolor var. duchartrei Engl.; Caladium bicolor var. eckhartii Engl.; Caladium bicolor var. enkeanum (K.Koch) Engl.; Caladium bicolor var. haematostigma Kunth; Caladium bicolor f. haematostigma (Kunth) Engl.; Caladium bicolor var. hendersonii Engl.; Caladium bicolor var. houbyanym Engl.; Caladium bicolor var. houlletii (Lem.) Engl.; Caladium bicolor var. ketteleri Engl.; Caladium bicolor var. kochii Engl.; Caladium bicolor var. kramerianum Engl.; Caladium bicolor var. laucheanum (K.Koch) Engl.; Caladium bicolor var. leopoldii Engl.; Caladium bicolor var. lindenii Engl.; Caladium bicolor var. macrophyllum (Lem.) Engl.; Caladium bicolor f. macrophyllum (Lem.) Engl.; Caladium bicolor f. macrophyllum (Lem.) Vent.; Caladium bicolor var. marginatum (K.Koch & C.D.Bouché) Engl.; Caladium bicolor var. mirabile (Lem.) Engl.; Caladium bicolor f. mirabile (Lem.) Engl.; Caladium bicolor f. mirabile (Lem.) Vent.; Caladium bicolor var. neumannii (Lem.) Engl.; Caladium bicolor f. neumannii (Lem.) Engl.; Caladium bicolor f. neumannii (Lem.) Vent.; Caladium bicolor var. pellucidum (DC.) Kunth; Caladium bicolor var. pellucidum (DC.) Engl.; Caladium bicolor var. perrieri (Lem.) Engl.; Caladium bicolor f. perrieri (Lem.) Engl.; Caladium bicolor f. perrieri (Lem.) Vent.; Caladium bicolor var. pictum (DC.) Kunth; Caladium bicolor var. poecile (Schott) Engl.; Caladium bicolor f. poecile (Schott) Engl.; Caladium bicolor var. regale (Lem.) Engl.; Caladium bicolor f. regale (Lem.) Engl.; Caladium bicolor f. regale (Lem.) Vent.; Caladium bicolor f. robustum Jonker; Caladium bicolor var. roseomaculatum Engl.; Caladium bicolor var. rubellum (K.Koch & Fint.) Engl.; Caladium bicolor var. rubicundum Engl.; Caladium bicolor f. rubicundum Stehlé; Caladium bicolor var. rubrivenium Engl.; Caladium bicolor var. sieboldii Engl.; Caladium bicolor var. splendens (K.Koch & Fint.) Engl.; Caladium bicolor f. splendens (K.Koch & Fint.) Engl.; Caladium bicolor var. stangeanum (K.Koch) Engl.; Caladium bicolor var. surinamense (Miq.) Engl.; Caladium bicolor f. surinamense (Miq.) Stehlé; Caladium bicolor var. transparens Engl.; Caladium bicolor var. vellozoanum (Schott) Engl.; Caladium bicolor f. vellozoanum (Schott) Engl.; Caladium bicolor var. vermitoxicum (Vell.) Stellfeld; Caladium bicolor var. verschaffeltii (Lem.) Engl.; Caladium bicolor f. verschaffeltii (Lem.) Engl.; Caladium bicolor f. verschaffeltii (Lem.) Vent.; Caladium bicolor var. wightii (Lem.) Engl.; Caladium bicolor f. wightii (Lem.) Engl.; Caladium brongniartii Lem.; Caladium chantinii Lem.; Caladium concolor K.Koch; Caladium connaertii Engl.; Caladium curwadlii Engl.; Caladium devosianum Lem.; Caladium discolor Engl.; Caladium duchartrei Engl.; Caladium dussii Sieber & Voss; Caladium eckhartii Lem. ex Engl.; Caladium enkeanum K.Koch; Caladium firmulum Schott; Caladium gaerdtii K.Koch & Fint.; Caladium griseoargenteum Engl.; Caladium haageanum K.Koch; Caladium haematostigma Kunth; Caladium hendersonii Engl.; Caladium hortulanum Bridsey; Caladium × hortulanum Birdsey; Caladium houbyanum Engl.; Caladium houlletii Lem.; Caladium jacquinii Ten.; Caladium ketteleri Engl.; Caladium kochii K.Koch; Caladium kramerianum Engl.; Caladium laucheanum K.Koch; Caladium leopoldii Engl.; Caladium lindenii Engl. [Invalid]; Caladium macrophyllum Lem.; Caladium marginatum K.Koch & C.D.Bouché; Caladium marmoratum Mathieu ex K.Koch; Caladium martersteigianum Engl.; Caladium medioradiatum L.Linden & Rodigas; Caladium mirabile Lem.; Caladium mooreanum Engl.; Caladium neumannii Lem.; Caladium ottonis Engl. [Invalid]; Caladium pallidinervium Engl.; Caladium pallidum K.Koch & C.D.Bouché; Caladium pellucidum DC.; Caladium perrieri Lem.; Caladium pictum DC.; Caladium poecile Schott; Caladium punctatissimum Engl.; Caladium purdieanum Schott; Caladium pusillum K.Koch; Caladium regale Lem.; Caladium reichenbachianum Stange ex Engl.; Caladium rougieri Verschaff.; Caladium rubellum K.Koch & Fint.; Caladium rubricaule Lem.; Caladium rubrovenium Engl.; Caladium sagittifolium Sieber ex Engl.; Caladium sieboldii Engl. [Invalid]; Caladium sororium Schott; Caladium splendens K.Koch & Fint.; Caladium spruceanum Schott; Caladium stangeanum K.Koch; Caladium steudneriifolium Engl.; Caladium surinamense Miq.; Caladium thelemannii Verschaff.; Caladium thripedestum Lem.; Caladium vellozoanum Schott; Caladium verschaffeltii Lem.; Caladium wagneri Engl.; Caladium wightii Lem.; Cyrtospadix bicolor (Aiton) Britton & P.Wilson

= Caladium bicolor =

Species of flowering plant

Caladium bicolor, called Heart of Jesus, is a species in the genus Caladium from Latin America. It is grown as a houseplant for its large, heart or lance-shaped leaves with striking green, white, pink, and red blotching. Hundreds of cultivars are available. (See List of Caladium cultivars.) It can be planted outside in USDA Hardiness Zone 10 as an ornamental. It is a problematic invasive species in Trinidad and Tobago, Guam, Micronesia, Palau, Hawaii and the Philippines, and naturalized populations can be found in most of the rest of the world's tropics, including Africa, the Indian subcontinent, southeast Asia and Malesia.

== Toxicity ==
C. bicolor contains calcium oxalate crystals, making all parts of the plant poisonous to humans, livestock, and pets. Sap coming in contact with the skin may cause skin irritation. Ingestion may cause burning and swelling of the lips, mouth, and tongue, as well as nausea, vomiting, and diarrhea. If a pet consumes caladium, in addition to vomiting, etc., the symptoms include drooling, pawing at mouth or face, and decreased appetite.

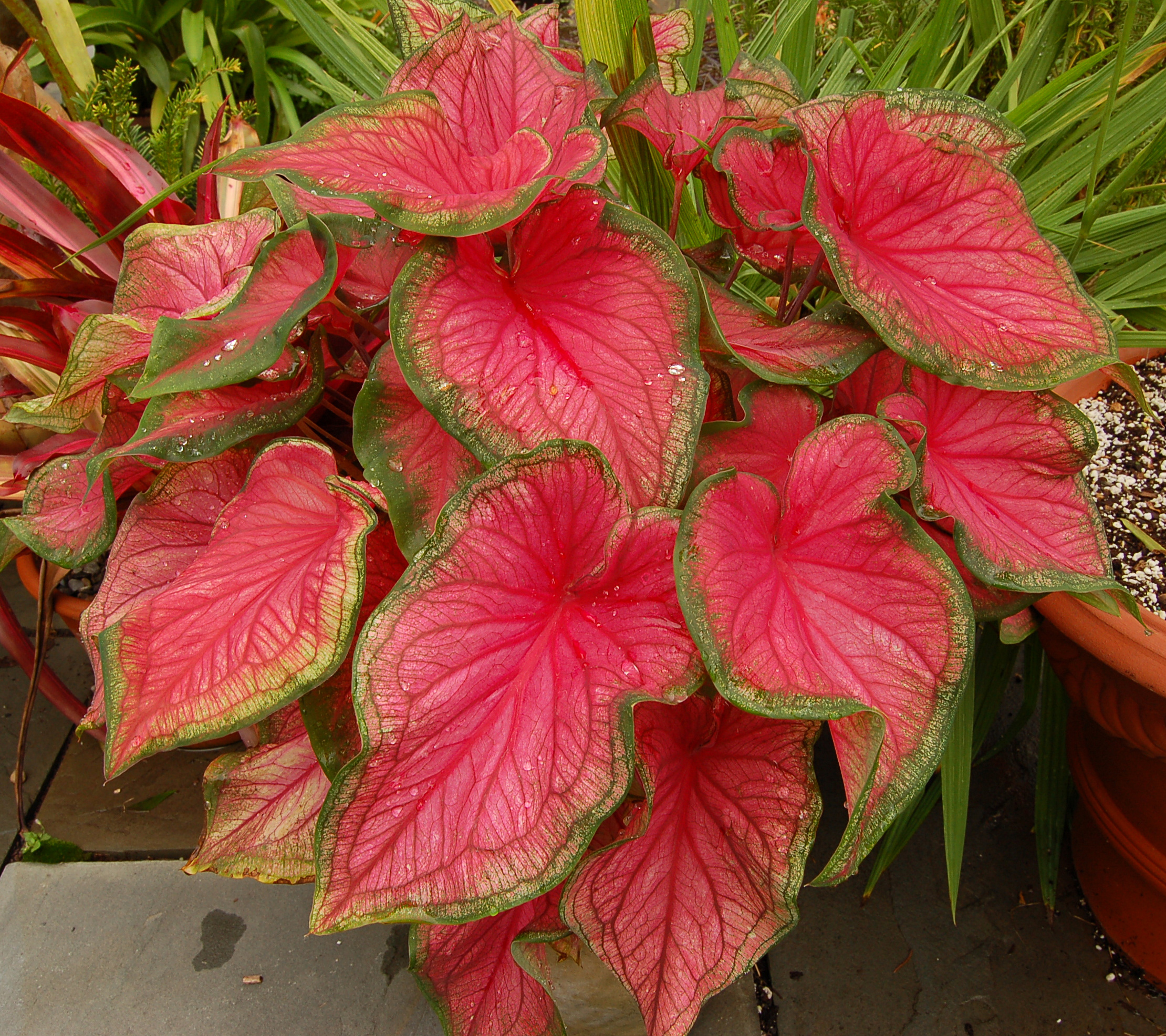
Caladium bicolor 'Florida Sweetheart'

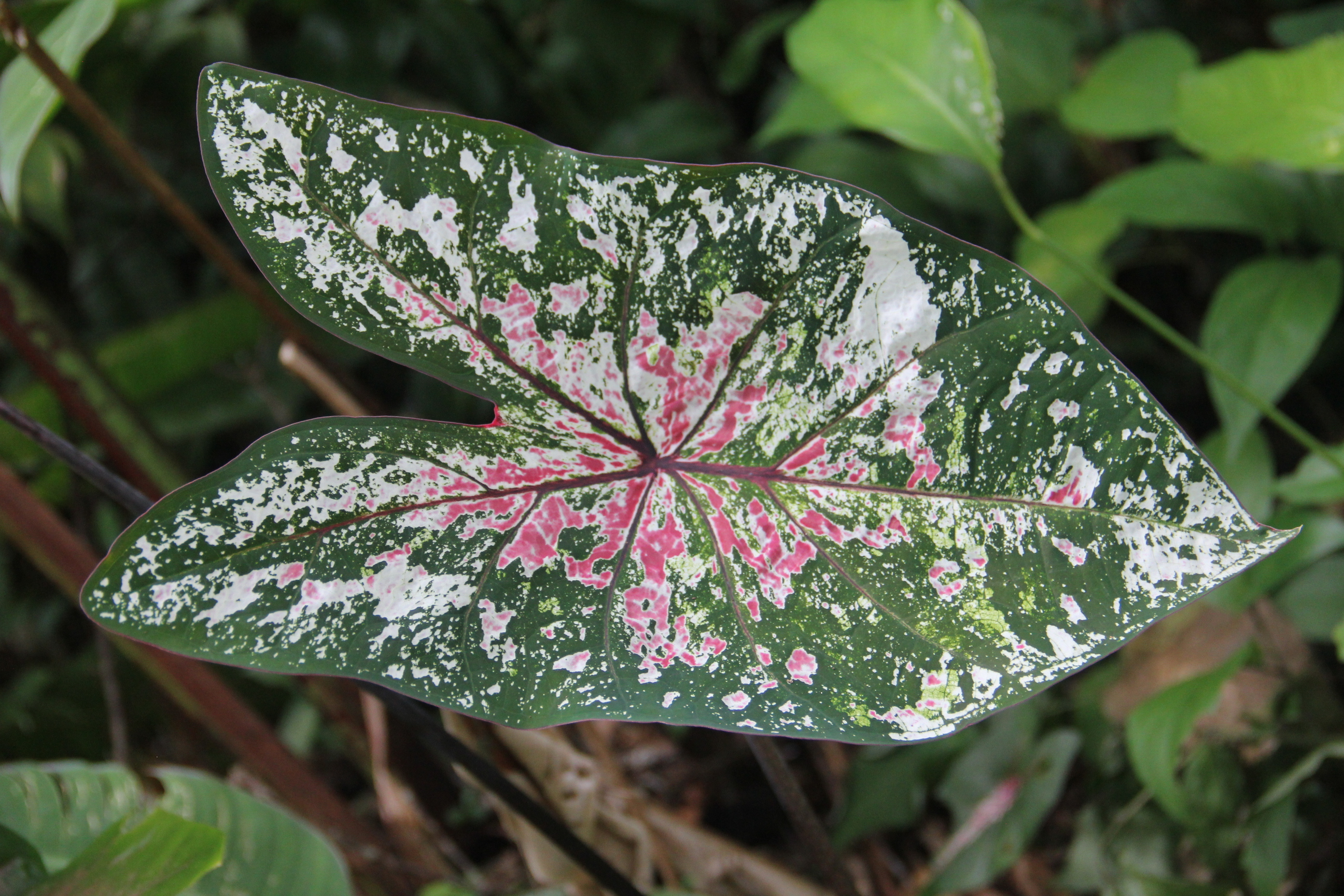

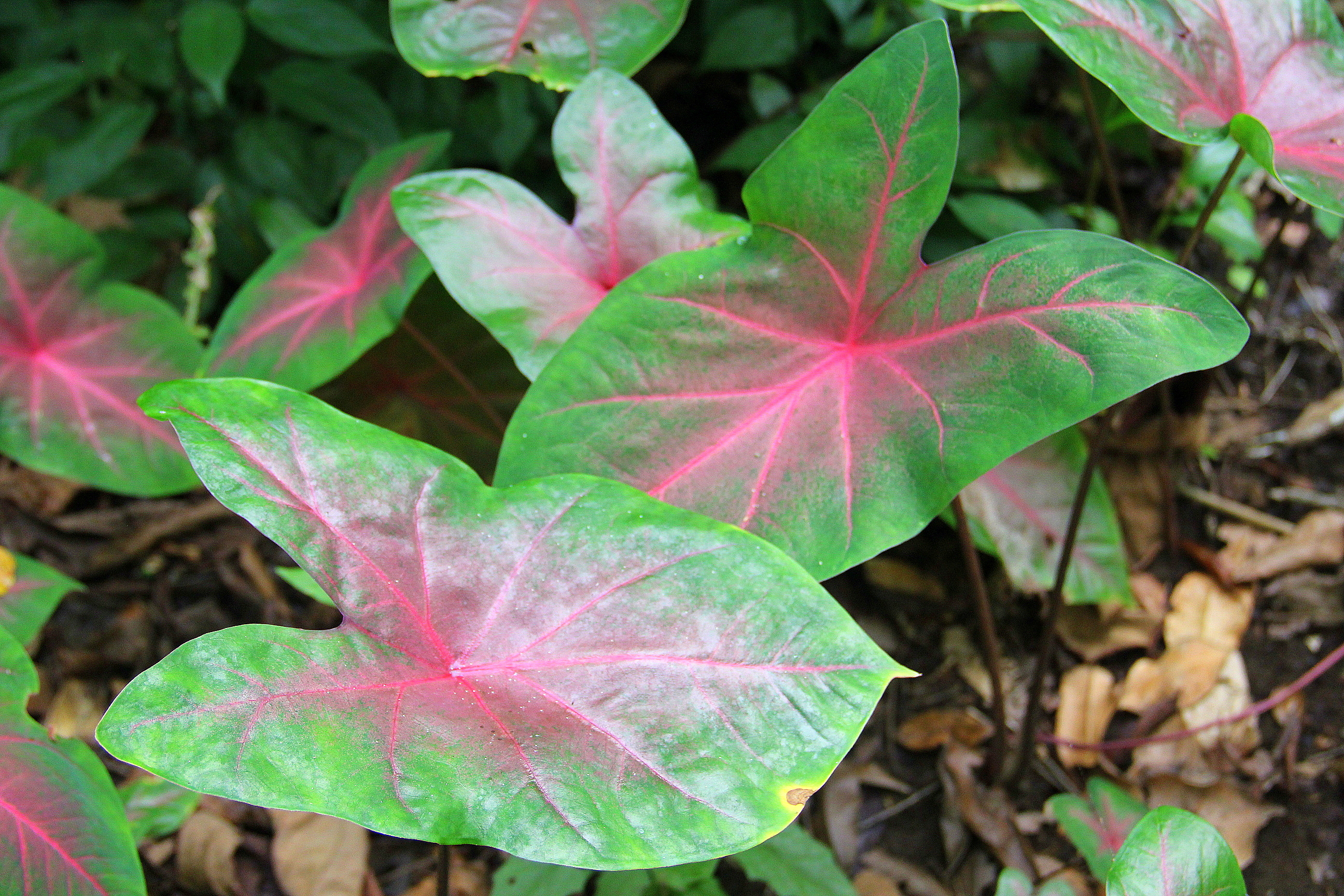

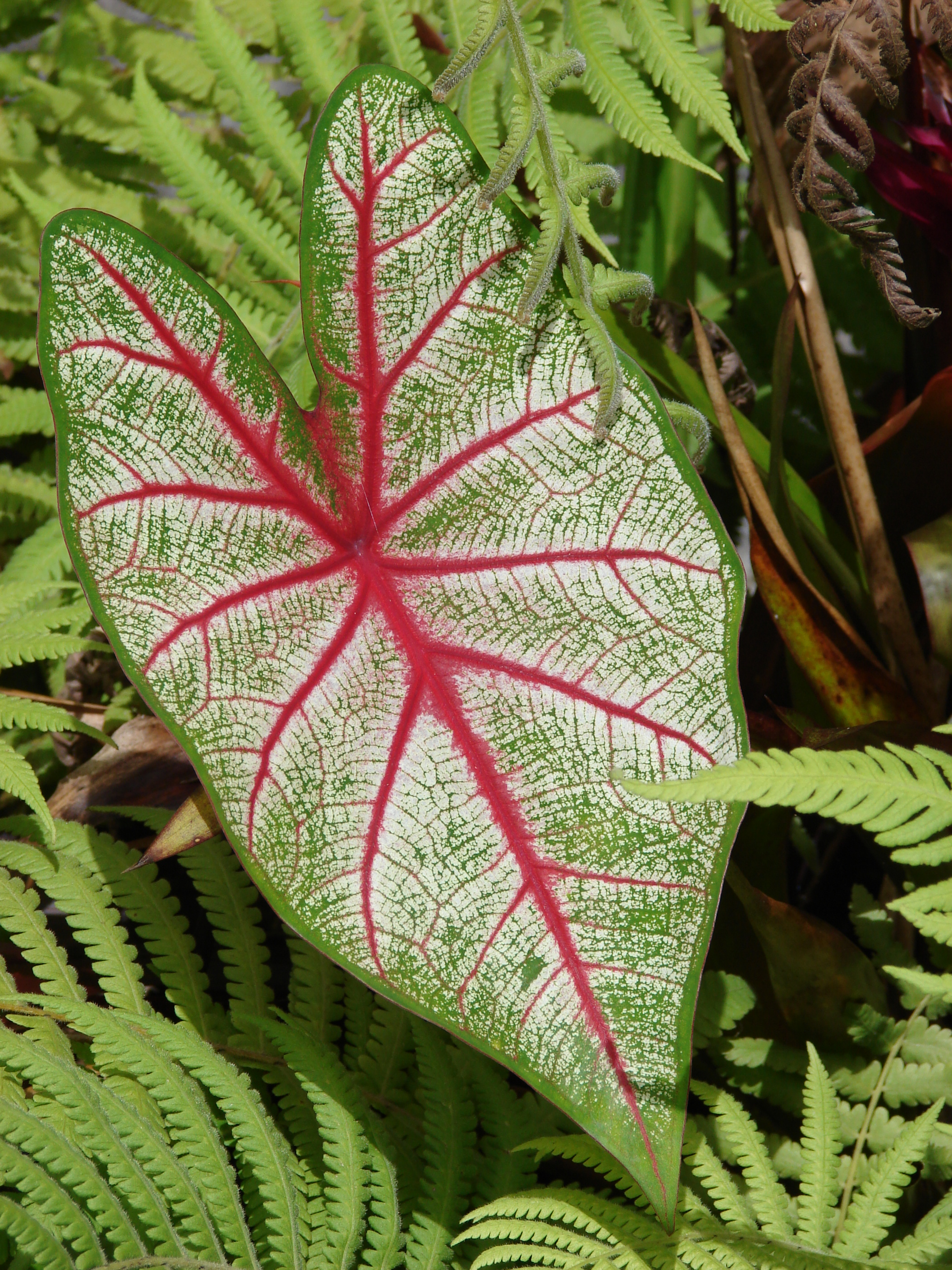

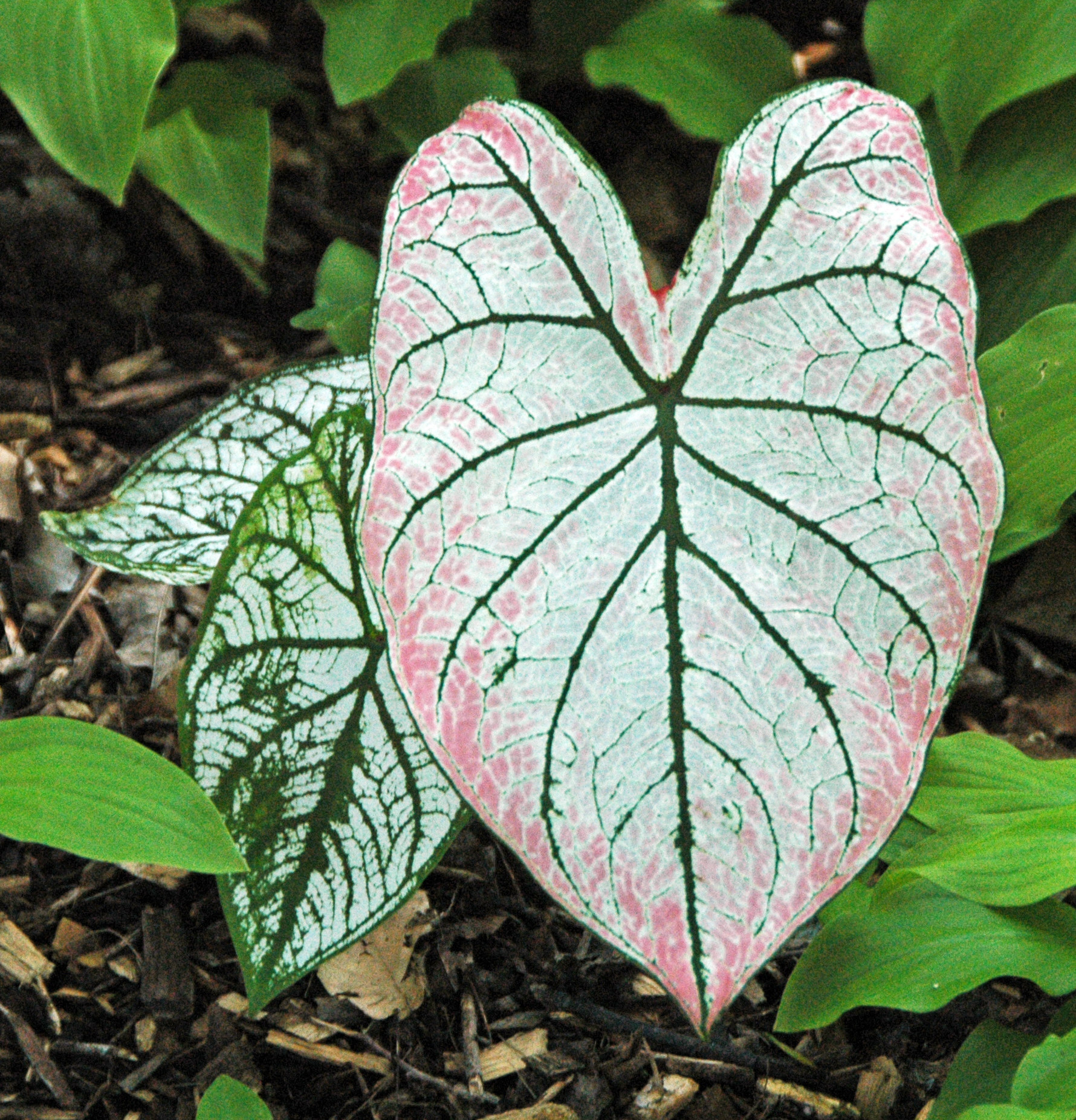

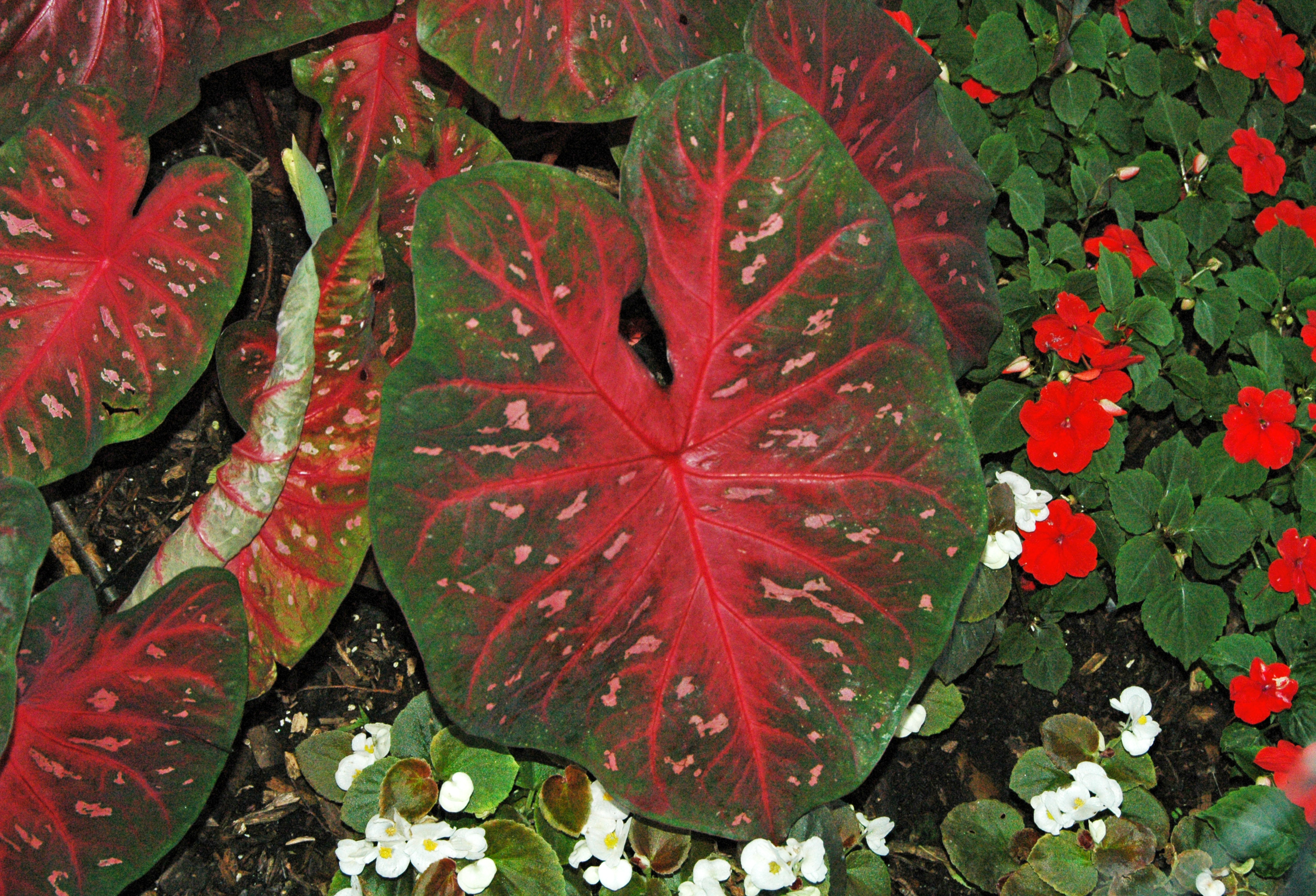

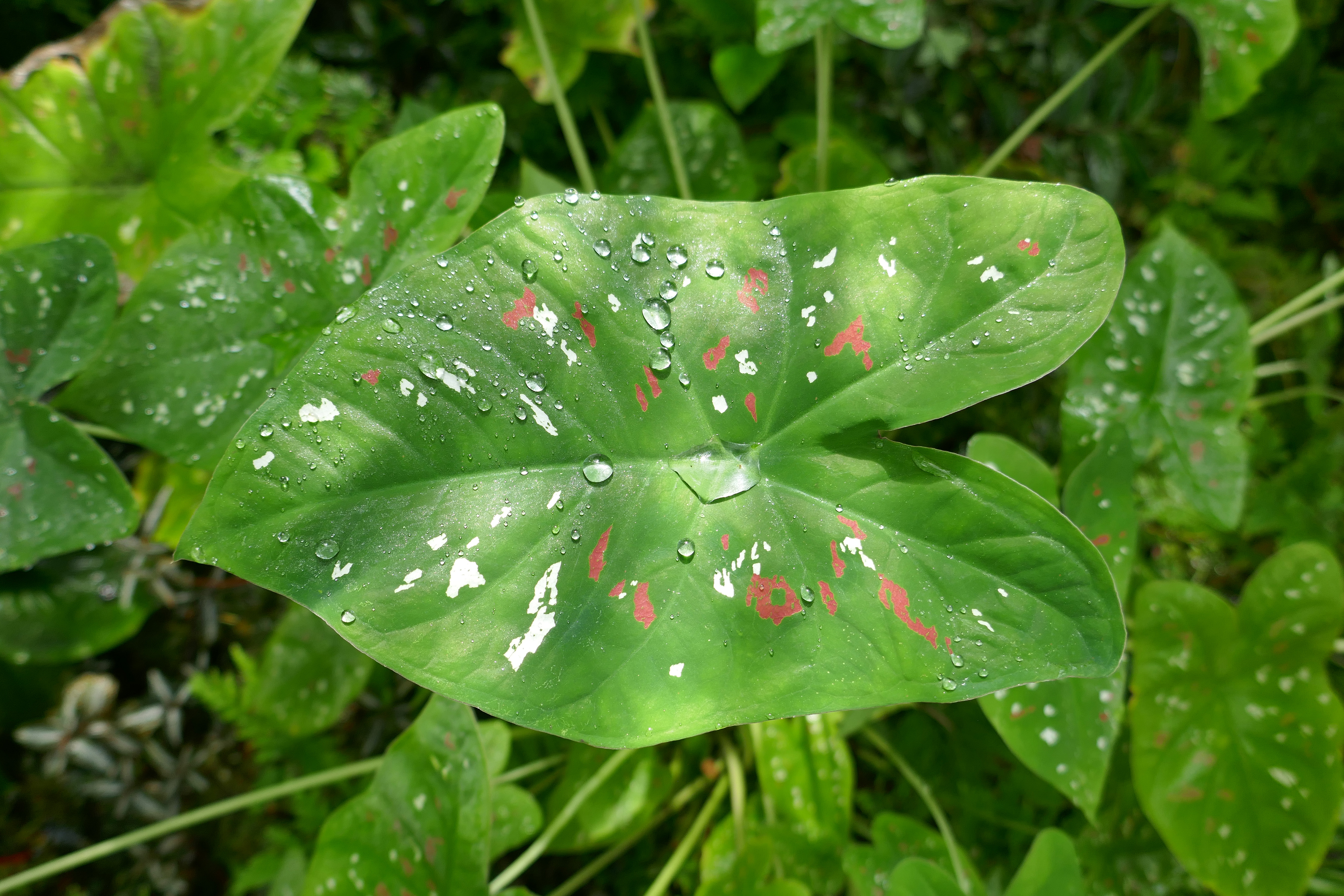

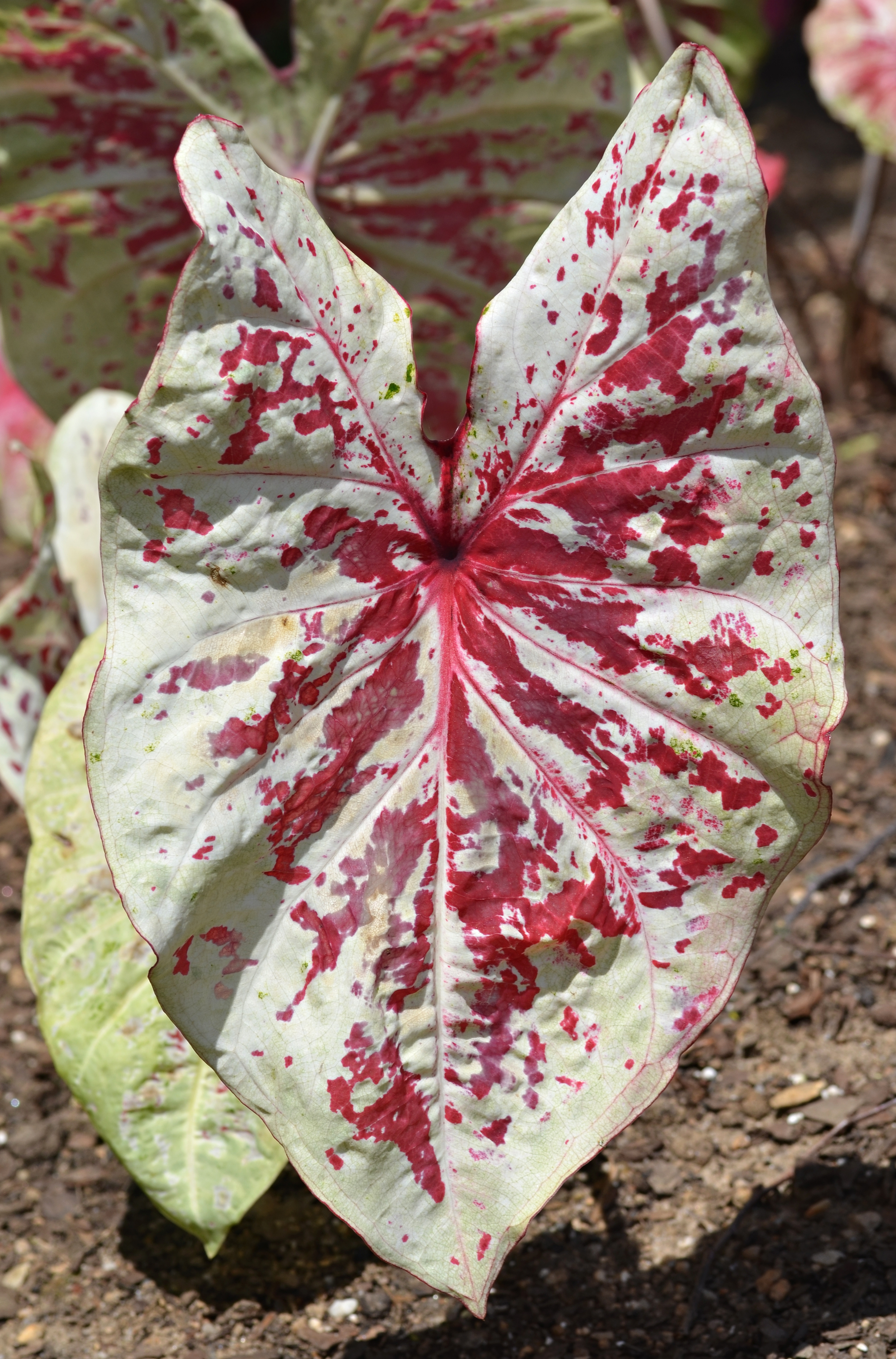

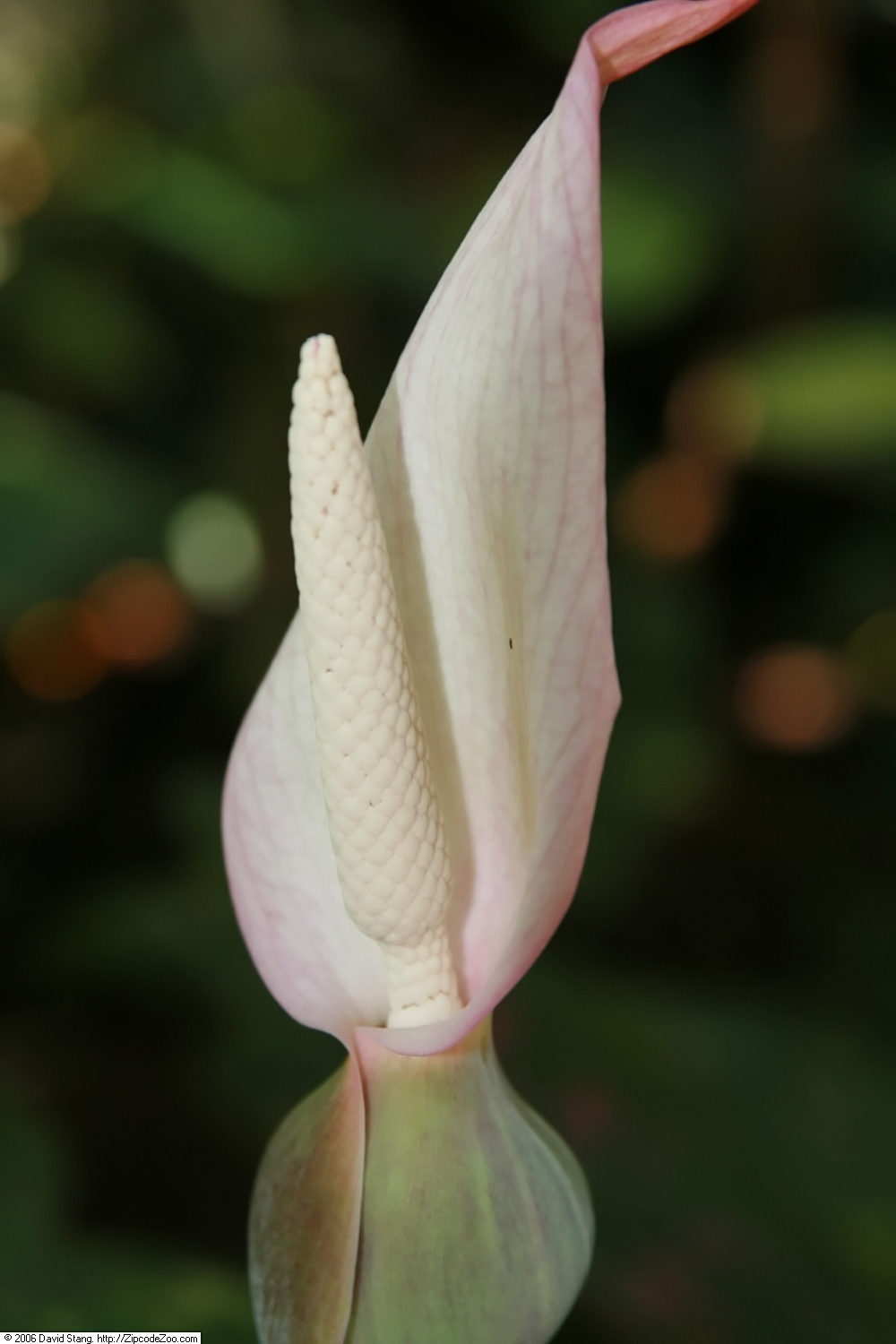
Flower
