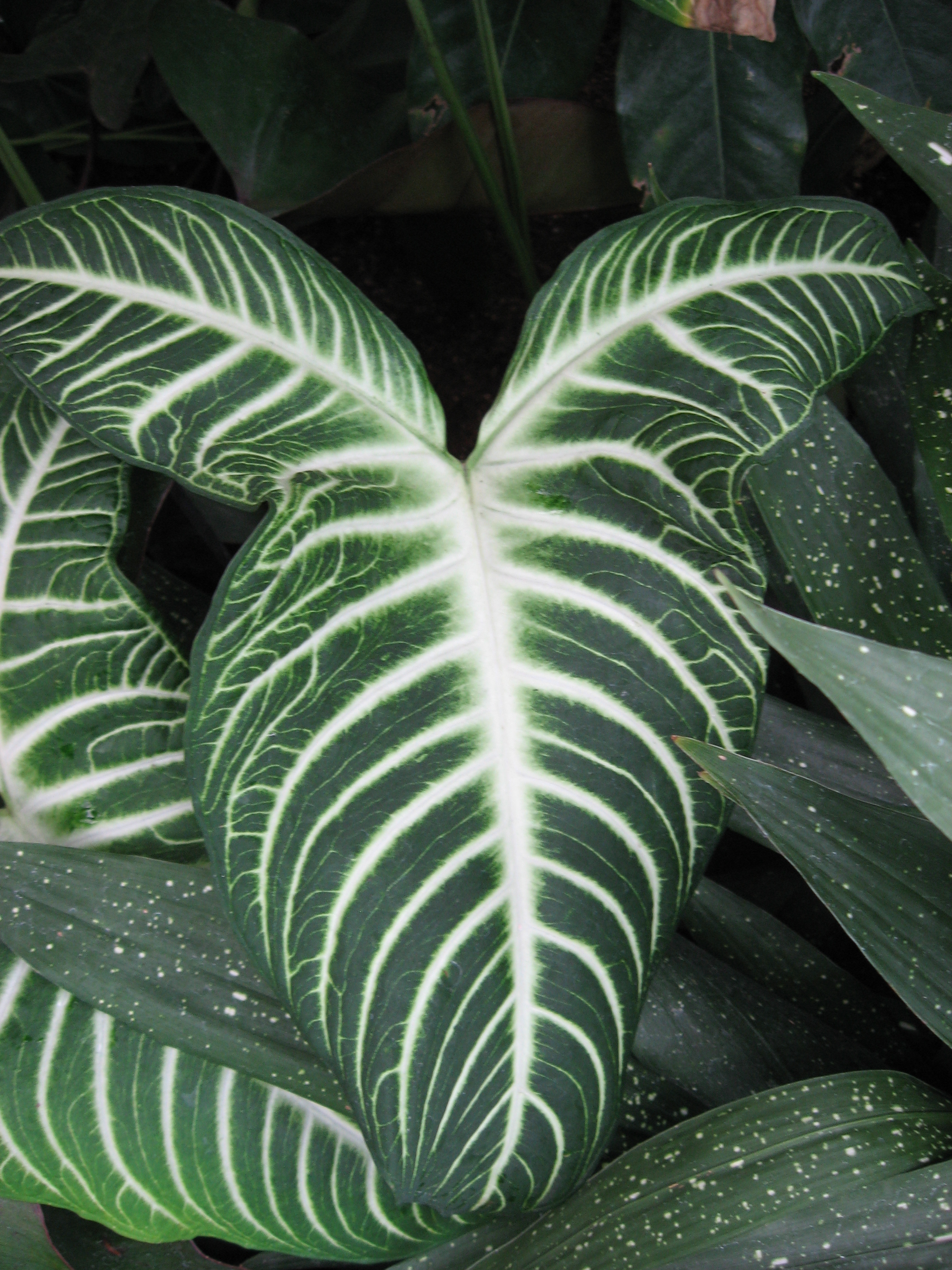

Scientific classification
- Kingdom: Plantae
- Clade: Tracheophytes
- Clade: Angiosperms
- Clade: Monocots
- Order: Alismatales
- Family: Araceae
- Genus: Phyllotaenium; André (1872)
- Species: P. lindenii

Binomial name
- Phyllotaenium lindenii André (1872)

Varieties
- Phyllotaenium lindenii var. lindenii; Phyllotaenium lindenii var. sylvestre (Grayum) A.Hay

Synonyms
- Caladium lindenii (André) Madison (1981), nom. illeg.; Xanthosoma lindenii (André) T.Moore (1878), nom. illeg.

= Phyllotaenium =

Genus of flowering plant

Phyllotaenium lindenii is a species of flowering plant in the family Araceae. It is the sole species in genus Phyllotaenium. It is a tuberous geophyte native to the wet tropics of Colombia and Panama. It is named after Belgian botanist Jean Jules Linden.

== Cultivation ==
Cultivars include Phyllotaenium lindenii 'Magnificum'.
