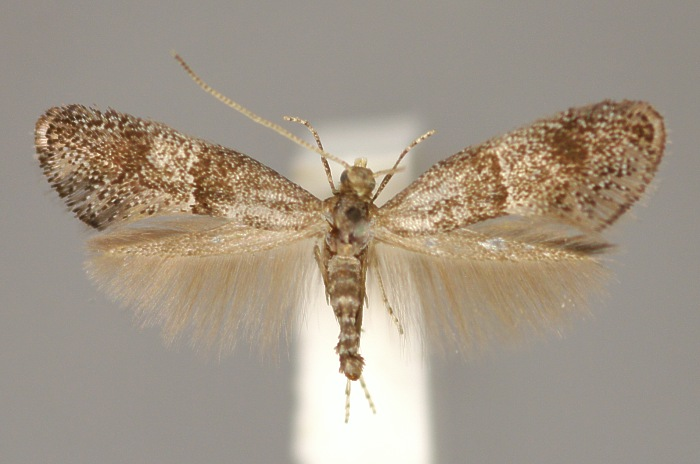
- Tinagma perdicella
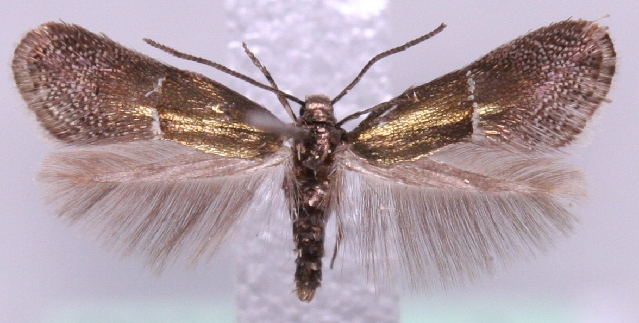
- Klimeschia transversella

Scientific classification
- Kingdom: Animalia
- Phylum: Arthropoda
- Clade: Pancrustacea
- Class: Insecta
- Order: Lepidoptera
- Clade: Apoditrysia
- Family: Douglasiidae; Heinemann & Wocke, 1876

Genera
- See text

= Douglasiidae =

Douglasiidae Temporal range: Cenomanian–Recent

Small family of moths

Douglasiidae is a small Lepidopteran family. It includes around 32 species of micromoth whose adults are collectively called Douglas moths, after British lepidopterist and hemipterist John William Douglas. The largest genus in the family is Tinagma. They are primarily found in the Palearctic realm, with some Nearctic species. The adults have a 6 to 15 mm wingspan, with a reduced hindwing venation and long fringes. The larvae are leaf miners or borers, primarily in stems and petioles, belonging to Boraginaceae, Labiatae, and Rosaceae.

== Genera ==
There are three extant genera:

- Klimeschia Amsel, 1938 – Palearctic
- Protonyctia Meyrick, 1932 – Ecuador
- Tinagma Zeller, 1839 (=Douglasia Stainton, 1854) – Palearctic and Nearctic

One genus is known from the fossil record:

- †Tanyglossus Poinar, 2017 Cenomanian, Burmese amber, Myanmar; its placement in the family Douglasiidae was contested by Yagi (2026).
