= List of Gypsophila species =

This is a list of species in the plant genus Gypsophila, which are often known as baby's breath. There are 146 species recognised in the genus Gypsophila:

== A ==
- Gypsophila acantholimoides Bornm.
- Gypsophila acutifolia Steven ex Spreng.
- Gypsophila adenophora Boiss. & Buhse
- Gypsophila adenophylla Barkoudah
- Gypsophila afghanica Kandemir & Ghaz.
- Gypsophila altissima L.
- Gypsophila alvandica Falat., F.Ghahrem. & Assadi
- Gypsophila anatolica Boiss. & Heldr.
- Gypsophila aretioides Boiss.
- Gypsophila arrostii Guss.
- Gypsophila arsusiana (Kotschy ex Boiss.) F.N.Williams
- Gypsophila aucheri Boiss.
- Gypsophila aulieatensis B.Fedtsch.
- Gypsophila australis (Schltdl.) A.Gray

== B ==
- Gypsophila babatagi (Ovcz.) Bondarenko
- Gypsophila baytopiorum Kit Tan
- Gypsophila bazorganica Rech.f.
- Gypsophila bellidifolia Boiss.
- Gypsophila bermejoi G.López
- Gypsophila bicolor (Freyn & Sint.) Grossh.
- Gypsophila bitlisensis Barkoudah
- Gypsophila brachypetala Trautv.
- Gypsophila briquetiana Schischk.
- Gypsophila bucharica B.Fedtsch.

== C ==
- Gypsophila capillaris (Forssk.) C.Chr.
- Gypsophila capitata M.Bieb.
- Gypsophila capituliflora Rupr.
- Gypsophila caricifolia Boiss.
- Gypsophila × castellana Pau
- Gypsophila coelesyriaca (Boiss. & Hausskn.) F.N.Williams
- Gypsophila collina Steven ex Ser.
- Gypsophila curvifolia Fenzl

== D ==
- Gypsophila damascena Boiss.
- Gypsophila davisii Barkoudah
- Gypsophila davurica (Turcz.) Fenzl
- Gypsophila diffusa Fisch. & C.A.Mey. ex Rupr.
- Gypsophila × digenea Borbás

== E-F ==
- Gypsophila elegans M.Bieb.
- Gypsophila erikii Yıld.
- Gypsophila eriocalyx Boiss.
- Gypsophila farsensis Falat., Assadi & F.Ghahrem.
- Gypsophila fastigiata L.
- Gypsophila fedtschenkoana Schischk.
- Gypsophila festucifolia Hub.-Mor.
- Gypsophila floribunda (Kar. & Kir.) Turcz. ex Fenzl

== G-H ==
- Gypsophila germanicopolitana Hub.-Mor.
- Gypsophila glandulosa (Boiss.) Walp.
- Gypsophila glomerata Pall. ex Adams
- Gypsophila graminifolia Barkoudak
- Gypsophila guvengorkii Armağan, Özgökçe & A.Çelik
- Gypsophila gypsophiloides (Fenzl) Blakelock
- Gypsophila hakkiarica Kit Tan
- Gypsophila heteropoda Freyn
- Gypsophila hispida Boiss.
- Gypsophila huashanensis Tsui & D.Q.Lu

== I-L ==
- Gypsophila imbricata Rupr.
- Gypsophila intricata Franch.
- Gypsophila iranica Barkoudah
- Gypsophila krascheninnikovii Schischk.
- Gypsophila laricina Schreb.
- Gypsophila lepidioides Boiss.
- Gypsophila leucochleana Hub.-Mor.
- Gypsophila libanotica Boiss.
- Gypsophila licentiana Hand.-Mazz.
- Gypsophila lignosa Hemsl. & Lace
- Gypsophila linearifolia (Fisch. & C.A.Mey.) Boiss.
- Gypsophila litwinowii Koso-Pol.
- Gypsophila lurorum Rech.f.

== M-N ==
- Gypsophila macedonica Vandas
- Gypsophila malyeri Hamzaoğlu & Koç
- Gypsophila melampoda Bien. ex Boiss.
- Gypsophila meyeri Rupr.
- Gypsophila modesta Bornm.
- Gypsophila mongolica Barkoudah
- Gypsophila mozaffarianii Negaresh
- Gypsophila mucronifolia Rech.f.
- Gypsophila munzurensis Armağan
- Gypsophila nabelekii Schischk.
- Gypsophila nana Bory & Chaub.
- Gypsophila neoszovitsiana Lazkov
- Gypsophila nodiflora (Boiss.) Barkoudah

== O-P ==
- Gypsophila oblanceolata Barkoudah
- Gypsophila oldhamiana Miq.
- Gypsophila olympica Boiss.
- Gypsophila osmangaziensis Ataşlar & Ocak
- Gypsophila pacifica Kom.
- Gypsophila pallasii Ikonn.
- Gypsophila pallida Stapf
- Gypsophila paniculata L.
- Gypsophila papillosa Porta
- Gypsophila parva Barkoudah
- Gypsophila patrinii Ser.
- Gypsophila perfoliata L.
- Gypsophila persica Barkoudak
- Gypsophila peshmenii Güner
- Gypsophila petraea (Baumg.) Rchb.
- Gypsophila pilosa Huds.
- Gypsophila pilulifera Boiss. & Heldr.
- Gypsophila pinifolia Boiss. & Hausskn.
- Gypsophila platyphylla Boiss.
- Gypsophila polyclada Fenzl ex Boiss.
- Gypsophila preobrashenskii Czerniak.
- Gypsophila pseudomelampoda Gauba & Rech.f.
- Gypsophila pseudopallida Falat., Assadi & F.Ghahrem.
- Gypsophila pulvinaris Rech.f.

== R-S ==
- Gypsophila repens L.
- Gypsophila reuteri (Boiss. & Hausskn.) F.N.Williams
- Gypsophila robusta Grossh.
- Gypsophila rupestris Kupr.
- Gypsophila ruscifolia Boiss.
- Gypsophila saligna Schrad.
- Gypsophila sambukii Schischk.
- Gypsophila saponarioides Bornm. & Gauba
- Gypsophila scorzonerifolia Ser.
- Gypsophila serpylloides Boiss. & Heldr.
- Gypsophila silenoides Rupr.
- Gypsophila simonii Hub.-Mor.
- Gypsophila simulatrix Bornm. & Woronow
- Gypsophila spathulifolia Fenzl
- Gypsophila spinosa D.Q.Lu
- Gypsophila steupii Schischk.
- Gypsophila struthium Loefl.
- Gypsophila syriaca Schischk.

== T-U ==
- Gypsophila takhtadzhanii Schischk. ex Ikonn.
- Gypsophila tenuifolia M.Bieb.
- Gypsophila tomentosa L.
- Gypsophila torulensis Koç
- Gypsophila transalaica Ikonn.
- Gypsophila tschiliensis J.Krause
- Gypsophila tuberculosa Hub.-Mor.
- Gypsophila tubulifiera Bornm.
- Gypsophila tubulosa (Jaub. & Spach) Boiss.
- Gypsophila turcica Hamzaoğlu
- Gypsophila umbricola (J.R.I.Wood) R.A.Clement
- Gypsophila uralensis Less.

== V-Z ==
- Gypsophila vaccaria (L.) Sm.
- Gypsophila vedeneevae Lepeschk. ex Botsch. & Vved.
- Gypsophila venusta Fenzl
- Gypsophila villosa Barkoudah
- Gypsophila vinogradovii Safonov
- Gypsophila virgata Boiss.
- Gypsophila viscosa Murray
- Gypsophila volgensis Krasnova
- Gypsophila wendelboi Rech.f.
- Gypsophila wilhelminae Rech.f.
- Gypsophila xanthochlora Rech.f.
- Gypsophila yazdiana Falat., F.Ghahrem. & Assadi
- Gypsophila yusufeliensis Budak
