= Eupithecia undata =

Scientific classification
- Kingdom: Animalia
- Phylum: Arthropoda
- Clade: Pancrustacea
- Class: Insecta
- Order: Lepidoptera
- Family: Geometridae
- Genus: Eupithecia
- Species: E. undata

Binomial name
- Eupithecia undata (Freyer, 1840)

Synonyms
- Eupithecia scriptaria Herrich-Schäffer, 1847

Species of moth

Eupithecia undata is a moth in the family Geometridae first described by Christian Friedrich Freyer in 1840. The North American Moth Photographers Group lists it as a synonym of Eupithecia lafontaineata. It is found in the Pyrenees, Alps, the Massif Central, the Tatra Mountains, on the Balkan Peninsula and in Romania. It is also found in North America, where it has been recorded from Wyoming, Montana, Idaho, Colorado, Nevada and Oregon.

The wingspan is 17–18 mm. Adults have been recorded on wing from mid-May to July in Europe.

The larvae feed on Silene and Minuartia species and Gypsophila repens. Larvae can be found from the end of June to mid-August. The species overwinters in the pupal stage.

== Subspecies ==
- Eupithecia undata undata
- Eupithecia undata abruzzensis Dietze, 1913
