= Coleophora burmanni =

Scientific classification
- Kingdom: Animalia
- Phylum: Arthropoda
- Class: Insecta
- Order: Lepidoptera
- Family: Coleophoridae
- Genus: Coleophora
- Species: C. burmanni

Binomial name
- Coleophora burmanni Toll, 1952

Species of moth

Coleophora burmanni is a moth of the family Coleophoridae. It is found in Spain, France, Switzerland, Austria, Germany and Latvia.

The larvae feed on the leaves of Gypsophila fastigiata and Gypsophila repens.
