= G. spinosa =

G. spinosa may refer to:

- Garra spinosa, a ray-finned fish species in the genus Garra
- Geoffraea spinosa, a poisonous flowering plant species in the genus Geoffraea
- Grayia spinosa, a small, multibranched, brambly shrub species
- Grevillea spinosa, an evergreen flowering plant species in the genus Grevillea
- Gypsophila spinosa, a herbaceous flowering plant species

== See also ==
- Spinosa (disambiguation)
