= Coleophora niveistrigella =

Scientific classification
- Kingdom: Animalia
- Phylum: Arthropoda
- Clade: Pancrustacea
- Class: Insecta
- Order: Lepidoptera
- Family: Coleophoridae
- Genus: Coleophora
- Species: C. niveistrigella

Binomial name
- Coleophora niveistrigella Wocke, 1877

Species of moth

Coleophora niveistrigella is a moth of the family Coleophoridae. It is found from Latvia to the Pyrenees and the Alps and from France to Slovakia. It is also found in southern Russia.

Adults are on wing from May to July.

The larvae feed on Gypsophila fastigiata. Full-grown larvae can be found in mid June.
