= Coleophora kyffhusana =

Scientific classification
- Kingdom: Animalia
- Phylum: Arthropoda
- Class: Insecta
- Order: Lepidoptera
- Family: Coleophoridae
- Genus: Coleophora
- Species: C. kyffhusana

Binomial name
- Coleophora kyffhusana Petry, 1898

Species of moth

Coleophora kyffhusana is a moth of the family Coleophoridae. It is found from Sweden to Hungary and from Germany to southern Russia.

The wingspan is 9–10 mm. Adults are on wing from May to August.

The larvae feed on Gypsophila fastigiata.
