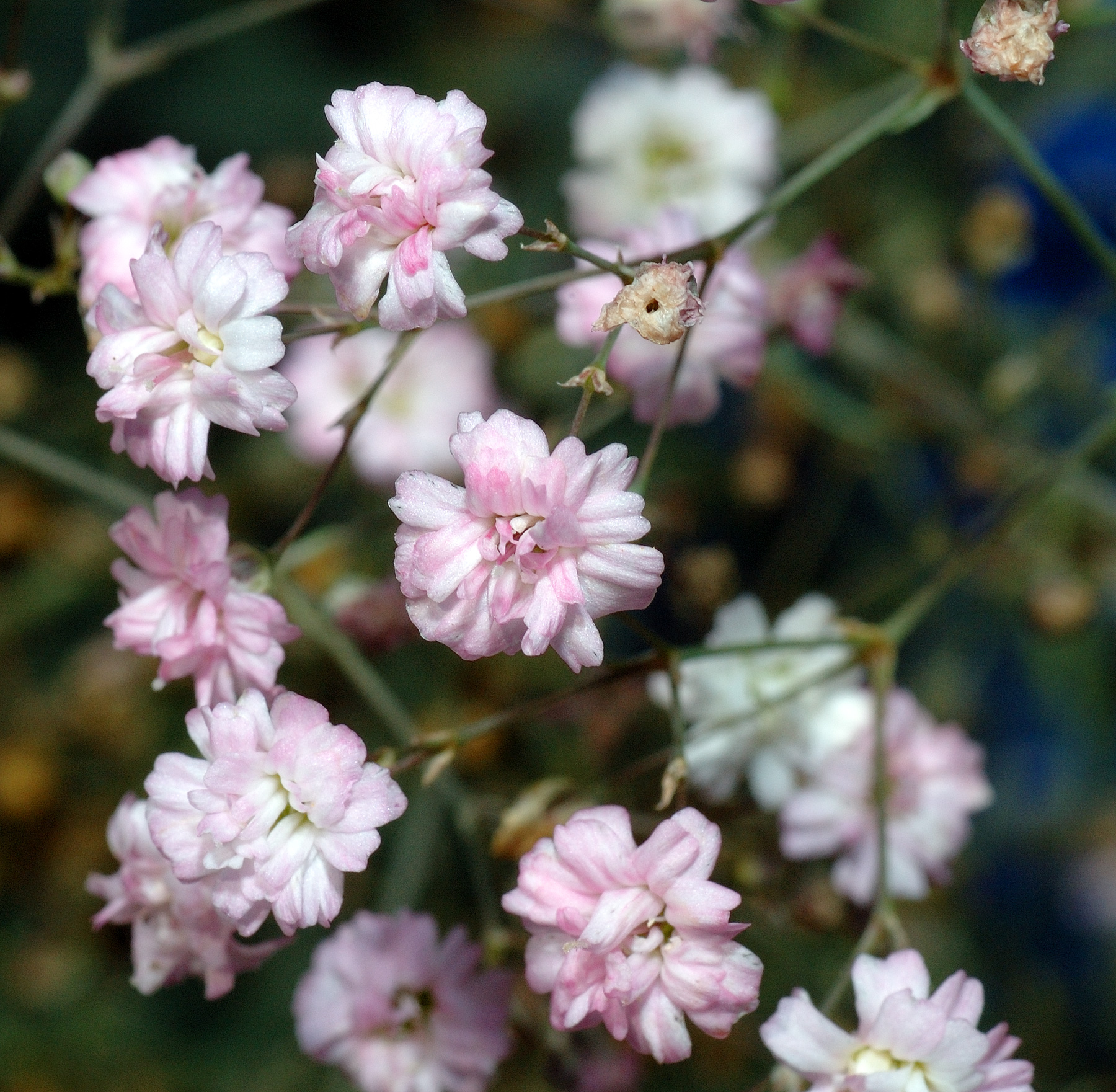
- Gypsophila repens

Scientific classification
- Kingdom: Plantae
- Clade: Tracheophytes
- Clade: Angiosperms
- Clade: Eudicots
- Order: Caryophyllales
- Family: Caryophyllaceae
- Genus: Gypsophila; L.

Species
- About 150

Synonyms
- List: Acosmia Benth. ex G.Don; Ankyropetalum Fenzl; Arrostia Raf.; Asophila Neck.; Banffya Baumg.; Bolbosaponaria Bondarenko; Dichoglottis Fisch. & C.A.Mey.; Gypsophytum Ehrh.; Hagenia Moench; Jordania Boiss.; Lanaria Adans.; Pseudosaponaria (F.N.Williams) Ikonn.; Rokejeka Forssk.; Vaccaria Wolf

= Gypsophila =

Genus of flowering plants

Gypsophila (/dʒɪpˈsɒfɪlə/) is a genus of flowering plants in the carnation family, Caryophyllaceae. They are native to Eurasia, Africa, Australia, and the Pacific Islands. Turkey has a particularly high diversity of Gypsophila taxa, with about 35 endemic species. Some Gypsophila are introduced species in other regions.

The genus name is from the Greek gypsos ("gypsum") and philios ("loving"), a reference to the gypsum-rich substrates on which some species grow. Plants of the genus are known commonly as baby's-breath, or bebe's breath, a name which also refers specifically to the well known ornamental species Gypsophila paniculata.

== Description ==
Gypsophila is one of the most heterogeneous and largest groups in the carnation tribe, Caryophylleae. The genus comprises approximately 150 species of annual or perennial herbaceous, creeping or cushion-forming plants, inhabiting primarily the mountainous steppes in the north temperate part of the Old World with a diversification hotspot in the Irano-Turanian region. These species also show major variation in inflorescence type ranging from many-flowered lax thyrses or panicles (e.g., G. elegans M.Bieb., G. paniculata L., G. pilosa Huds.) to compact head-like cymes ( G. capitata M.Bieb., G. capituliflora Rupr., G. caricifolia Boiss.), and few-(uni-)flowered raceme-like monochasia (e.g., G. bazorganica Rech.f., G. saponarioides Bornm. & Gauba). Each small flower has a cup-like calyx of white-edged green sepals containing five petals in shades of white or pink. The fruit is a rounded or oval capsule opening at valves. It contains several brown or black seeds which are often shaped like a kidney or a snail shell.

== Uses ==
A few species are commercially cultivated for several uses, including floristry, herbal medicine, and food. The baby's-breath most commonly used in flower arrangements such as bouquets is the common gypsophila, G. paniculata. G. elegans is also used as a cut flower.

The genus is a source of saponins that can be used for many purposes, including the production of photographic film and hemolytic laboratory reagents. Their detergent qualities make them useful in soap and shampoo.

G. rokejeka is used to make the dessert halva. Species are also ingredients in liqueur, cheese, and ice cream, providing flavor, aroma, and crispness to foods.

Several species are hyperaccumulators of boron, and may be planted to absorb the element from polluted soils.

The plant is also used in making a foam-like topping for a popular dessert called "kerebiç" in Mersin province of Turkey.

== Ecology ==
Some species are known as weeds, including the "aggressive ornamental" G. paniculata, which invades habitat and competes with native flora.

The plant G. simonii (çöven in Turkish) is widely distributed in Turkey, where it is a native species.

== Selected species ==
There are about 150 species in the genus.

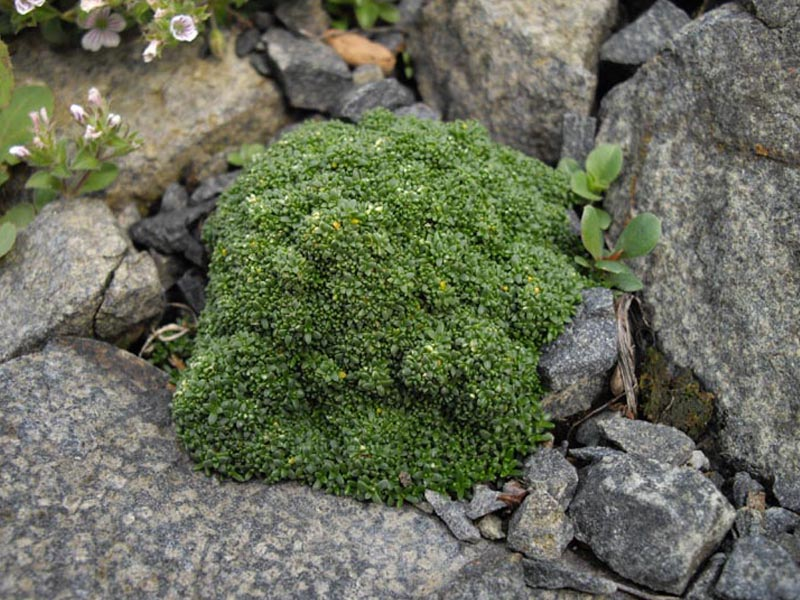
Gypsophila aretioides

Stereo image
Left frame
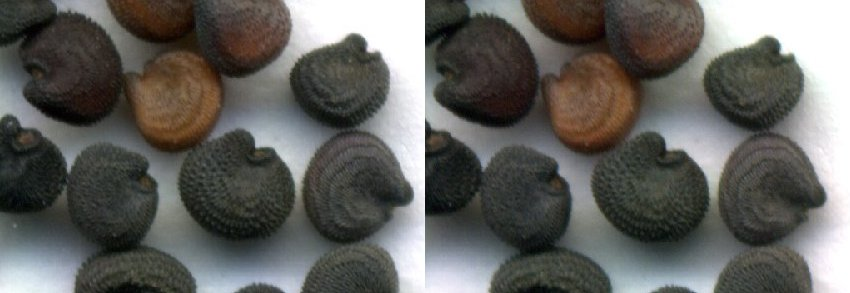
Right frame
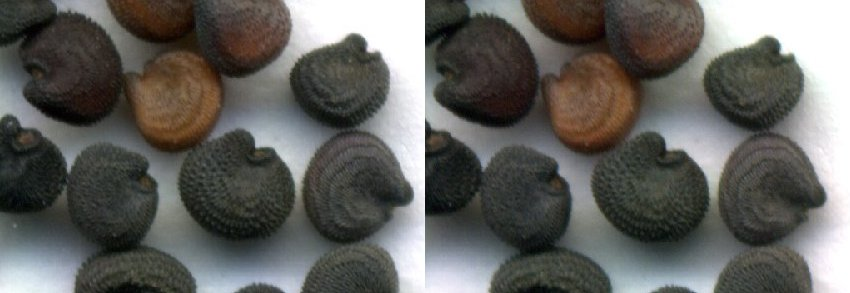
Parallel view
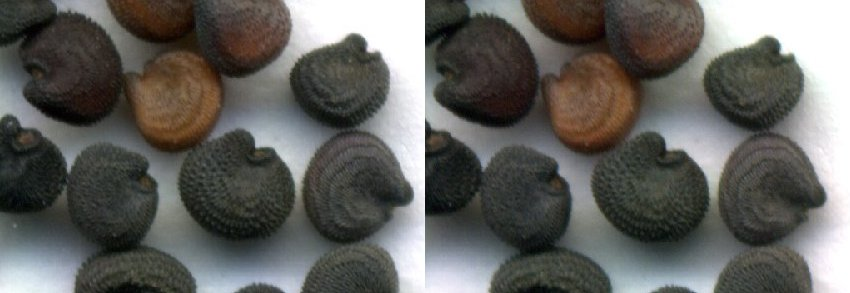
Cross-eye view
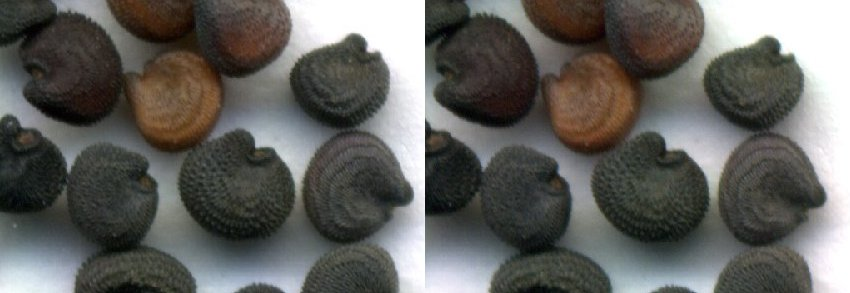

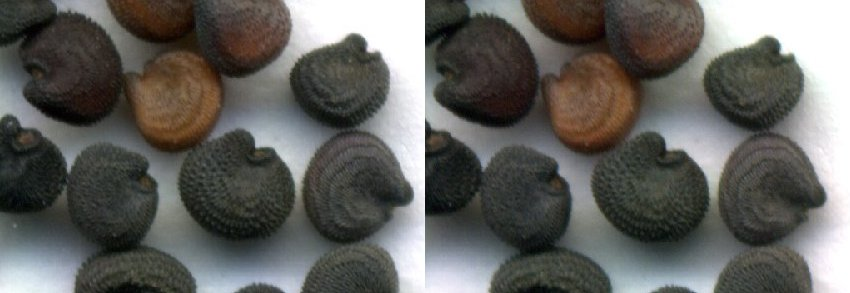
- Gypsophila sp. seeds

Species include:

- Gypsophila acutifolia – sharpleaf baby's-breath
- Gypsophila arrostii – Arrost's baby's-breath
- Gypsophila elegans – showy baby's-breath
- Gypsophila fastigiata – fastigiate gypsophila
- Gypsophila litwinowii
- Gypsophila nana – dwarf gypsophila
- Gypsophila oldhamiana – Manchurian baby's-breath, Oldham's baby's-breath
- Gypsophila paniculata – baby's-breath, common gypsophila, panicled baby's-breath
- Gypsophila perfoliata – perfoliate gypsophila
- Gypsophila petraea
- Gypsophila pilosa – Turkish baby's-breath
- Gypsophila repens – alpine gypsophila, creeping baby's-breath
- Gypsophila scorzonerifolia – glandular baby's-breath, garden baby's-breath
- Gypsophila spinosa
- Gypsophila stevenii – Steven's baby's-breath

Gypsophila muralis (annual gypsophila, cushion baby's-breath, low baby's-breath) is now placed in the genus Psammophiliella.
