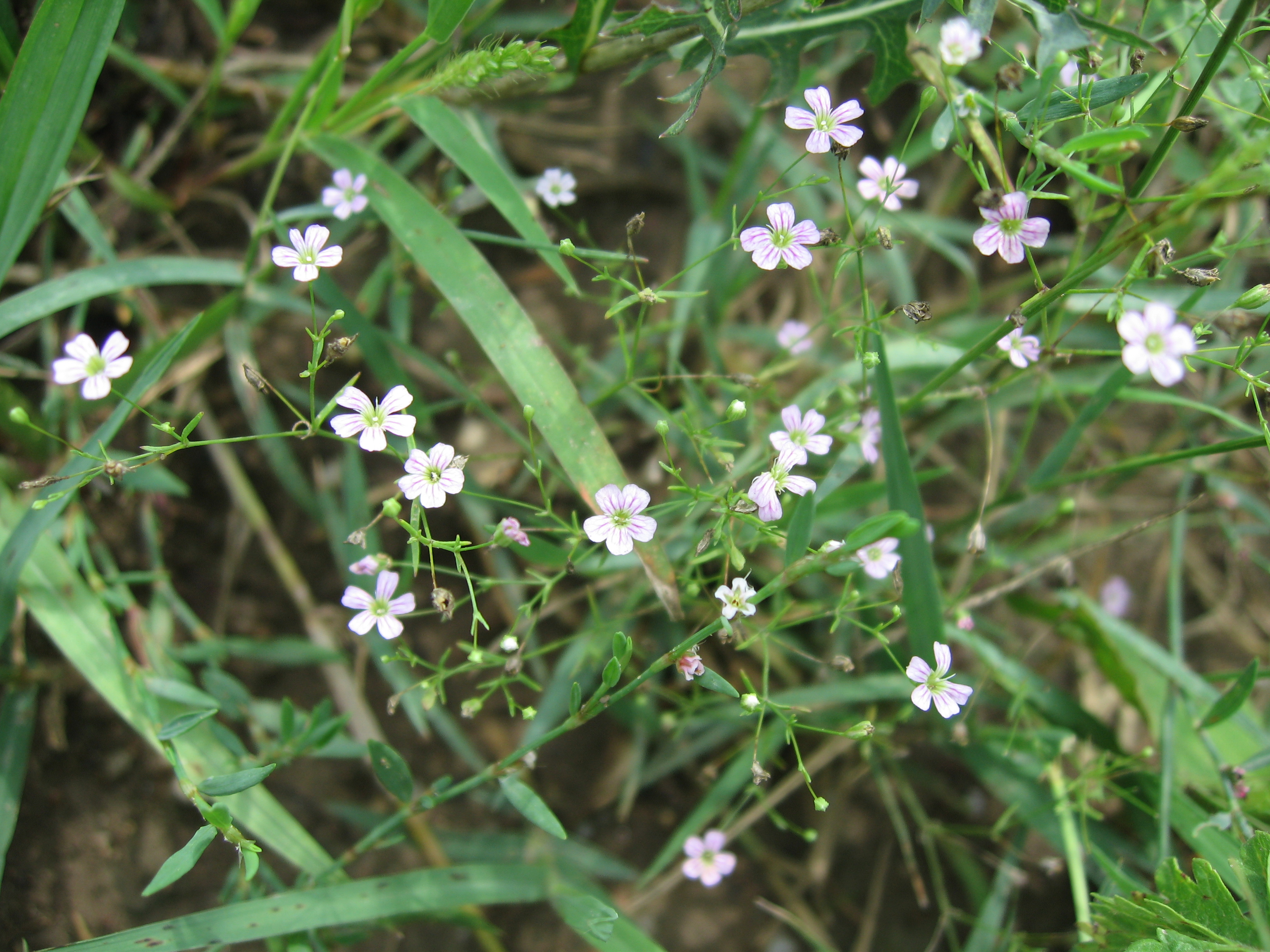

Scientific classification
- Kingdom: Plantae
- Clade: Tracheophytes
- Clade: Angiosperms
- Clade: Eudicots
- Order: Caryophyllales
- Family: Caryophyllaceae
- Genus: Psammophiliella
- Species: P. muralis

Binomial name
- Psammophiliella muralis (L.) Ikonn.

Synonyms
- Dichoglottis muralis (L.) Jaub. & Spach; Gypsophila agrestis Pers.; Gypsophila arvensis Borkh. ex Steud.; Gypsophila muralis L.; Gypsophila serotina Hayne; Gypsophila stepposa Klokov; Psammophila muralis (L.) Ikonn.; Psammophila stepposa (Klokov) Ikonn.; Psammophiliella stepposa (Klokov) Ikonn.; Saponaria muralis (L.) Lam.; Silene muralis (L.) E.H.L.Krause

= Psammophiliella muralis =

Annual gypsophila

Species of plant

Psammophiliella muralis (synonym Gypsophila muralis) is a species of flowering plants in the family Caryophyllaceae. It is known as annual gypsophila, cushion baby's-breath and low baby's-breath, an annual plant principally native to Europe except the British Isles. It can be also found in Central Asia, Turkey, the Caucasus, and Siberia. It is one of two species in genus Psammophiliella.

== Description ==
Psammophiliella muralis is an annual, with erect glabrous (non hairy) stems. It grows up to 30–40 cm (12–16 in) tall, with linear shaped leaves. It blooms between summer and fall, with pink or very occasionally white flowers, which are 3.5–6 cm (1.4–2.4 in) across. Later it has fruit capsules, which are ovoid or ellipsoid, inside are snail-shaped seeds.

== Taxonomy ==
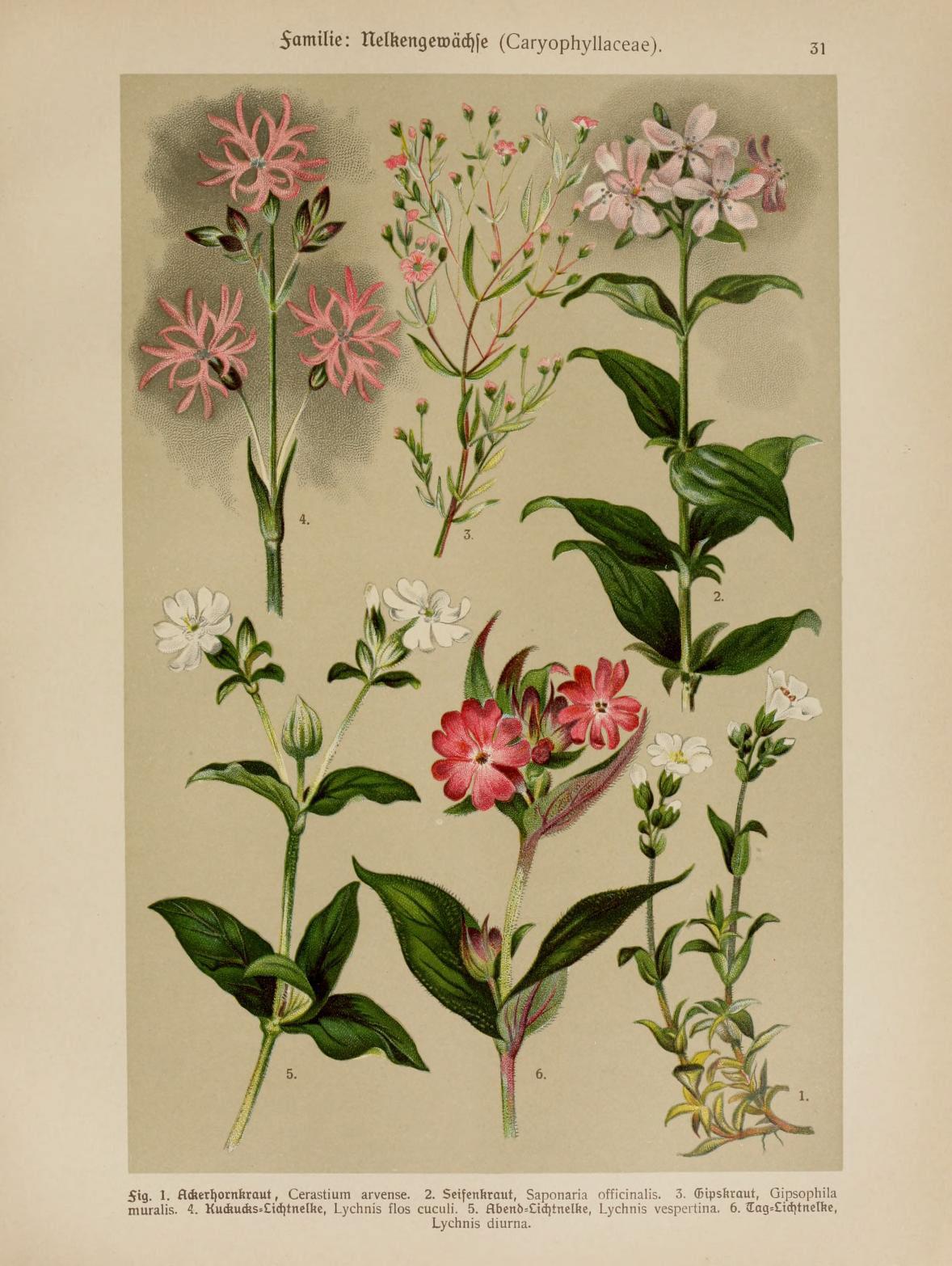
Illustration from Hoffmann-Dennert botanischer Bilderatlas in 1911

The species was first described by the Swedish botanist Carl Linnaeus in Species Plantarum on page 408 in 1753, as Gypsophila muralis.

It was once confused with Petrorhagia saxifraga (L) Link.

The Latin specific epithet muralis is derived from the Latin word meaning 'growing on the wall'.

It has the common names of 'annual gypsophila', 'cushion baby's-breath', 'low baby's-breath'.

== Distribution and habitat ==
It is native to temperate regions of Europe and Asia, and tropical Pakistan.

=== Range ===
It is found in Asia, within Kazakhstan, Uzbekistan, Siberia and Pakistan. In eastern Europe, it is found within Belarus, Estonia, Latvia, Lithuania and Ukraine. In middle Europe, it is in Austria, Belgium, the Czech Republic, Germany, Hungary, the Netherlands, Poland, Slovakia and Switzerland. In northern Europe, in Finland and Sweden. In southeastern Europe, within Bosnia and Herzegovina, Bulgaria, Croatia, Greece, Italy, North Macedonia, Romania, Serbia, Slovenia and Turkey. Lastly, it is found in southwestern Europe, it is found in France and Spain.

It has naturalized in many parts of Asia, including China and Japan, as well as parts of North America, from Canada (Ontario and Quebec) and in the United States (within Connecticut, District of Columbia, Indiana, Maine, Massachusetts, Michigan, New Hampshire, New Jersey, New York, Pennsylvania, Rhode Island, South Dakota, Vermont and Wisconsin).

=== Habitat ===
Grows on non-calcerous soils in eastern North America.
