= Gypsophila litwinowii =

Scientific classification
- Kingdom: Plantae
- Clade: Tracheophytes
- Clade: Angiosperms
- Clade: Eudicots
- Order: Caryophyllales
- Family: Caryophyllaceae
- Genus: Gypsophila
- Species: G. litwinowii

Binomial name
- Gypsophila litwinowii Koso-Pol.

Species of plant in the carnation family

Gypsophila litwinowii is a species of flowering plant in the family Caryophyllaceae, native to central European Russia, northwest of Voronezh. It is confined to chalk outcrops.
