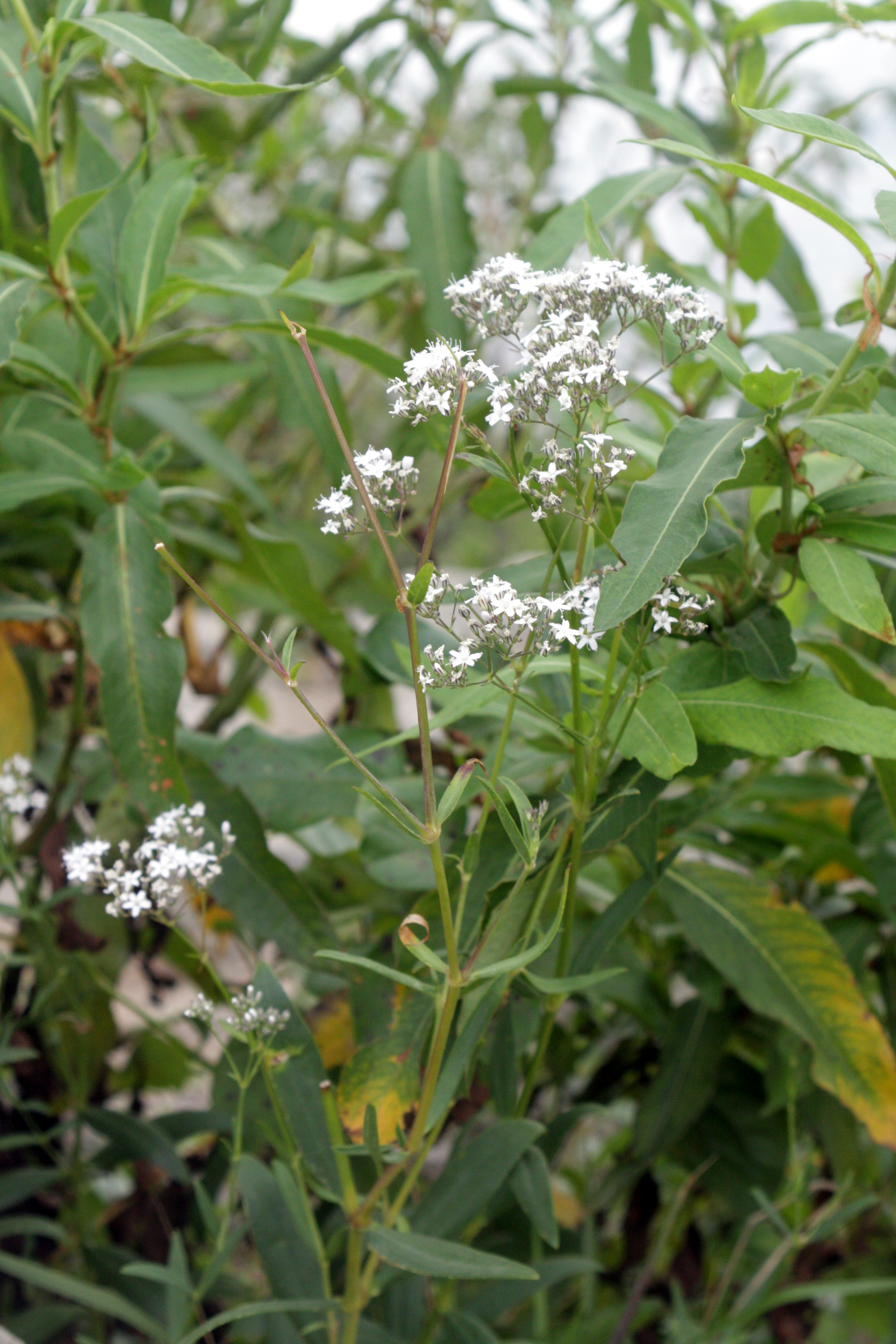

Scientific classification
- Kingdom: Plantae
- Clade: Tracheophytes
- Clade: Angiosperms
- Clade: Eudicots
- Order: Caryophyllales
- Family: Caryophyllaceae
- Genus: Gypsophila
- Species: G. oldhamiana

Binomial name
- Gypsophila oldhamiana Miq.

= Gypsophila oldhamiana =

Species of flowering plant

Gypsophila oldhamiana, the Manchurian baby's-breath or Oldham's baby's-breath, is a flowering plant of the family Caryophyllaceae.
