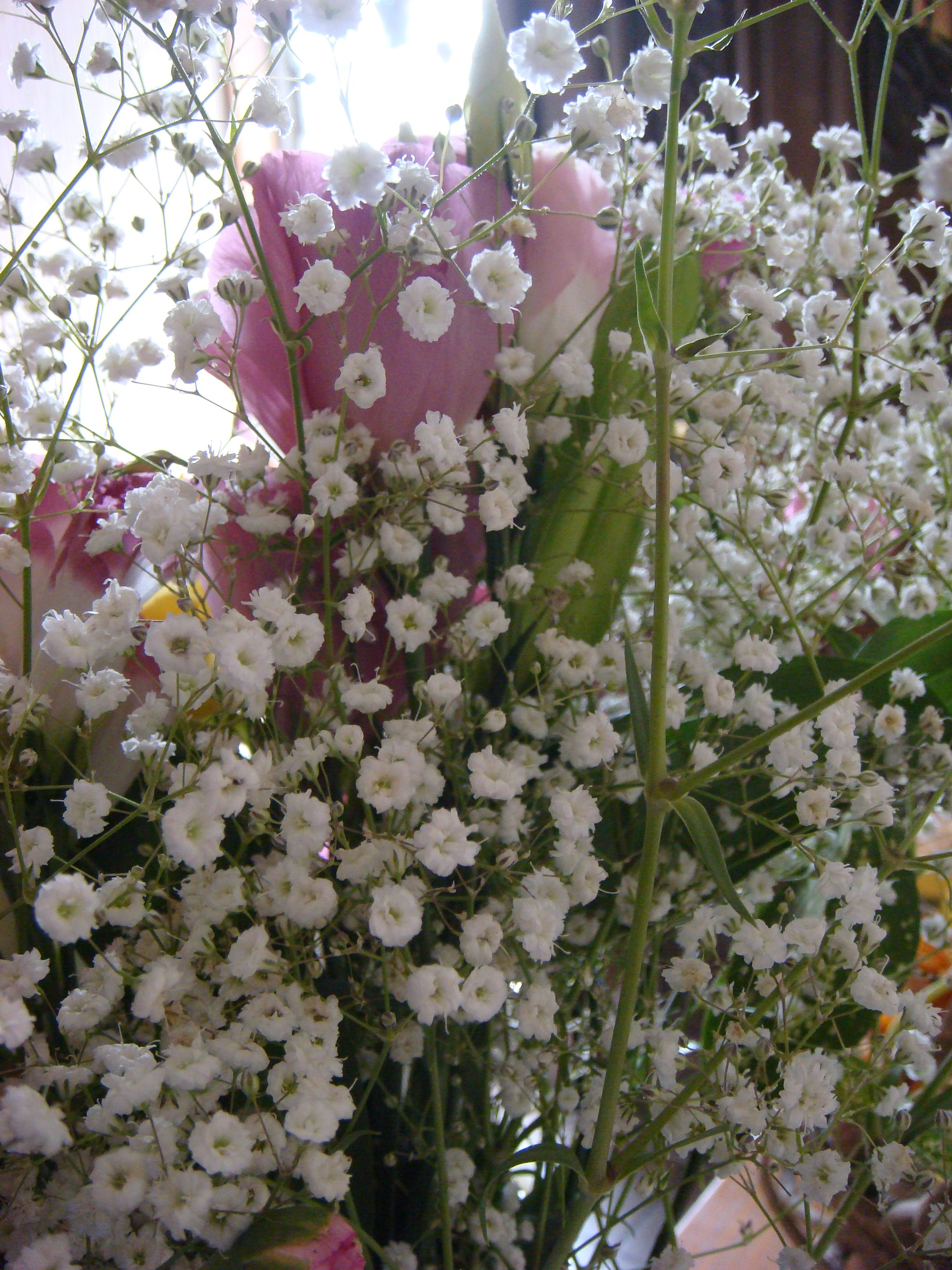

Scientific classification
- Kingdom: Plantae
- Clade: Tracheophytes
- Clade: Angiosperms
- Clade: Eudicots
- Order: Caryophyllales
- Family: Caryophyllaceae
- Genus: Gypsophila
- Species: G. elegans

Binomial name
- Gypsophila elegans M.Bieb.

= Gypsophila elegans =

Species of flowering plant

Gypsophila elegans, the annual baby's-breath or showy baby's-breath, is an ornamental plant native to Asia and Europe.
