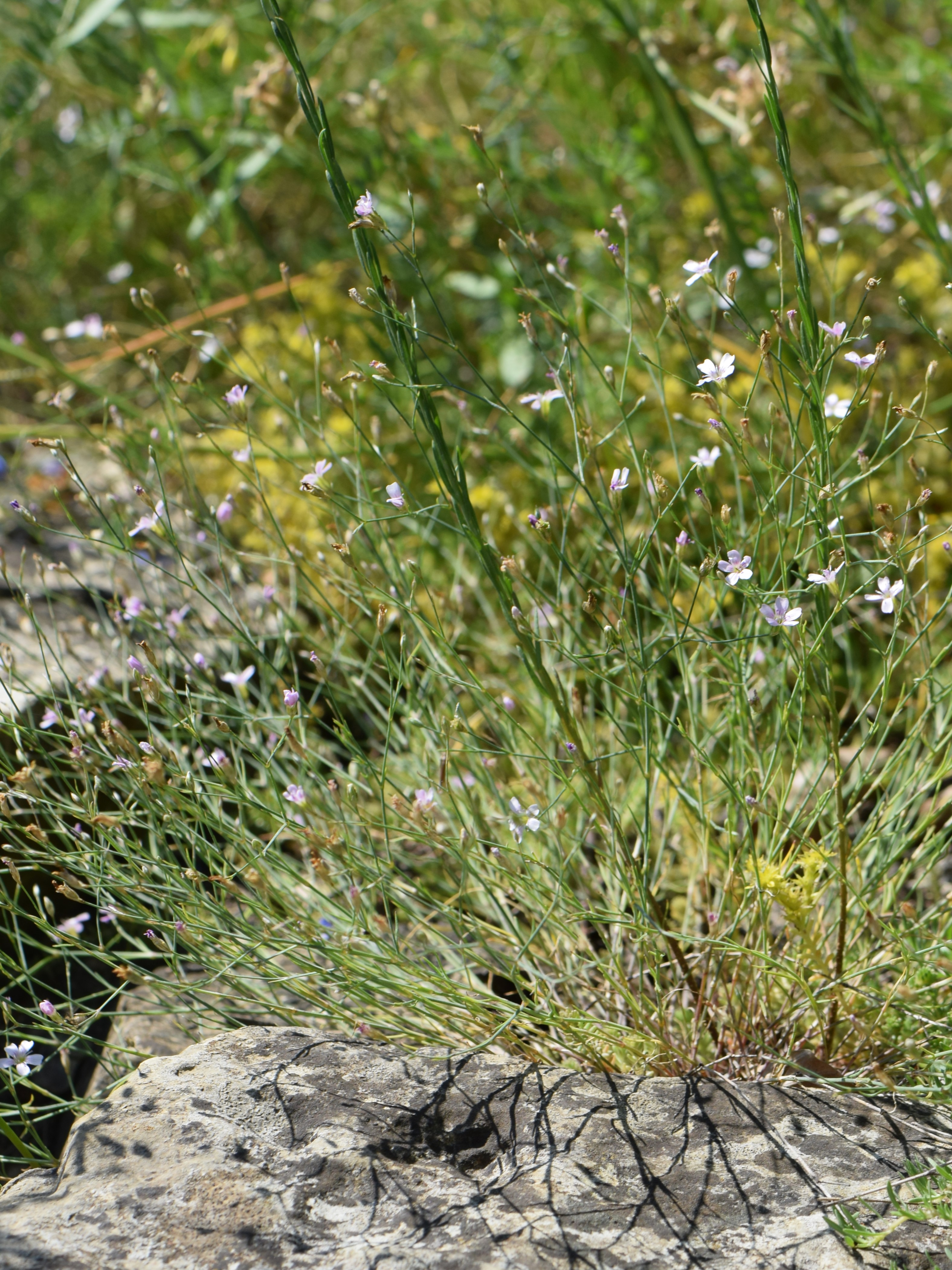
- At Berlin Botanical Garden

Scientific classification
- Kingdom: Plantae
- Clade: Tracheophytes
- Clade: Angiosperms
- Clade: Eudicots
- Order: Caryophyllales
- Family: Caryophyllaceae
- Genus: Gypsophila
- Species: G. petraea

Binomial name
- Gypsophila petraea (Baumg.) Reichenb.

= Gypsophila petraea =

Species of flowering plant

Gypsophila petraea is a species of the genus Gypsophila in the plant family Caryophyllaceae. Endemic to the Eastern Carpathians and Southern Carpathians, Romania.
