= Eupithecia lafontaineata =

Scientific classification
- Domain: Eukaryota
- Kingdom: Animalia
- Phylum: Arthropoda
- Class: Insecta
- Order: Lepidoptera
- Family: Geometridae
- Genus: Eupithecia
- Species: E. lafontaineata

Binomial name
- Eupithecia lafontaineata Bolte, 1990

Species of moth

Eupithecia lafontaineata is a moth in the family Geometridae. It is found in North America, including Alberta, California, Montana and Wyoming.

The wingspan is about 16 mm. Adults have been recorded on wing from June to July.
