= Psammophiliella =

Scientific classification
- Kingdom: Plantae
- Clade: Tracheophytes
- Clade: Angiosperms
- Clade: Eudicots
- Order: Caryophyllales
- Family: Caryophyllaceae
- Genus: Psammophiliella; Ikonn. (1976)

Species
- Psammophiliella esfandiarii (Assadi) Falat., Assadi & F.Ghahrem.; Psammophiliella muralis (L.) Ikonn.

Synonyms
- Psammophila Fourr. ex Ikonn. (1971), nom. illeg.

Genus of flowering plants

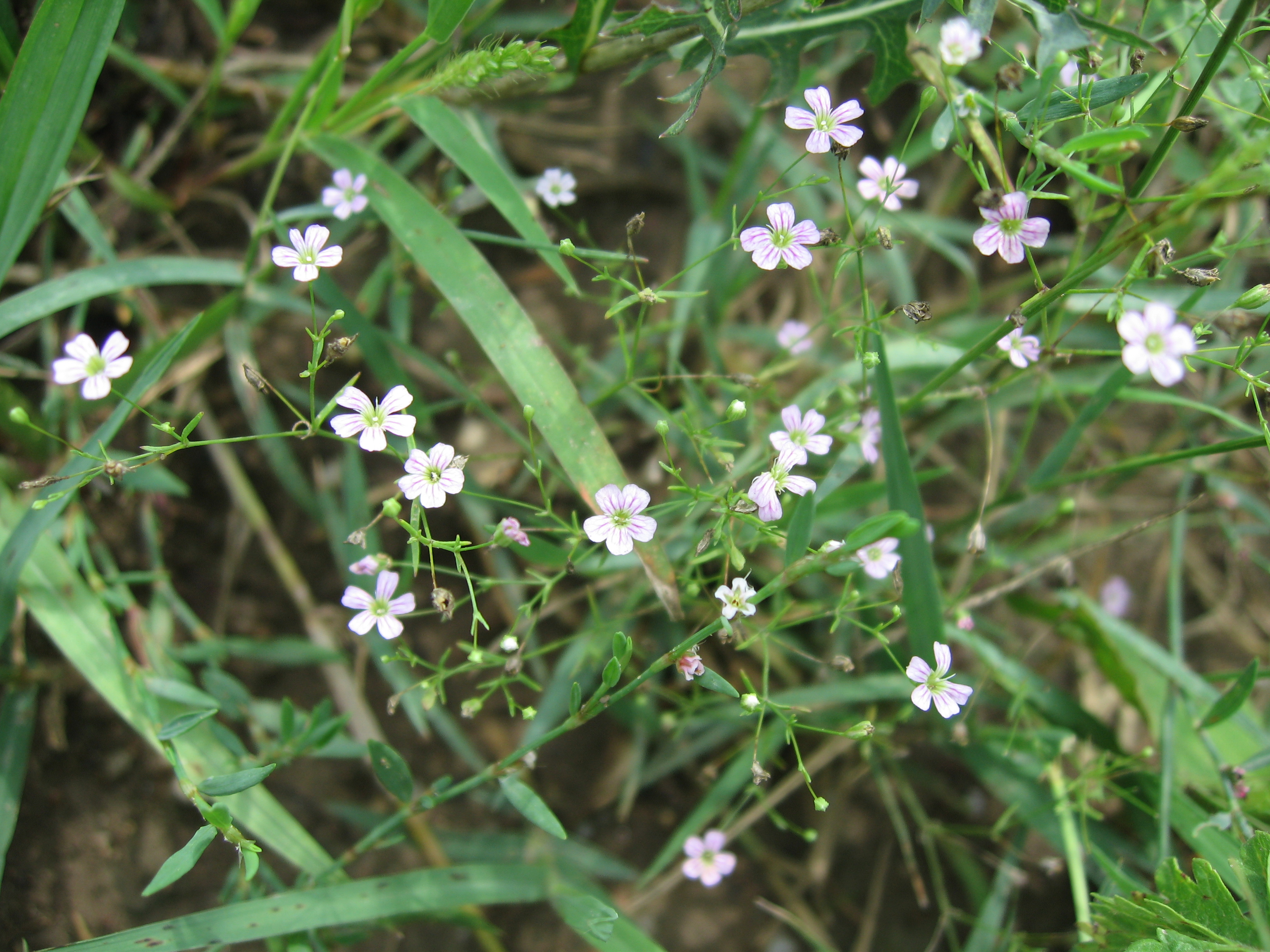

Psammophiliella is a genus of flowering plants in the carnation family, Caryophyllaceae. It includes two species native to Eurasia, ranging from Europe to Siberia and the western Himalayas.

- Psammophiliella esfandiarii (Assadi) Falat., Assadi & F.Ghahrem. – Iran
- Psammophiliella muralis (L.) Ikonn. – Europe, Siberia, Central Asia, the Caucasus, and the western Himalayas.
