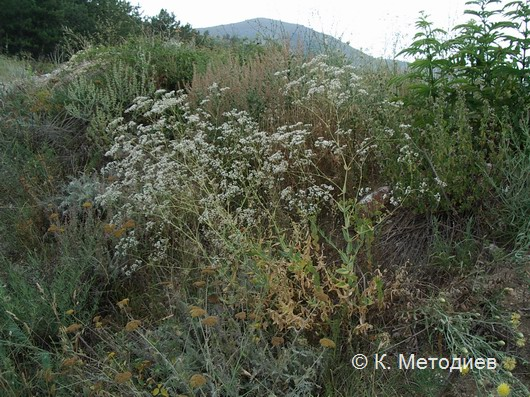

Scientific classification
- Kingdom: Plantae
- Clade: Tracheophytes
- Clade: Angiosperms
- Clade: Eudicots
- Order: Caryophyllales
- Family: Caryophyllaceae
- Genus: Gypsophila
- Species: G. perfoliata

Binomial name
- Gypsophila perfoliata L.

= Gypsophila perfoliata =

Species of flowering plant

Gypsophila perfoliata, the perfoliate gypsophila, is a species of plant in the family Caryophyllaceae.
