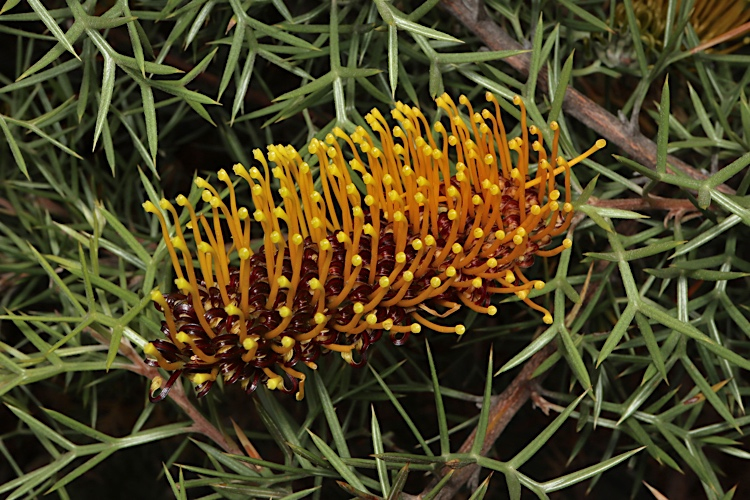
- In the Australian Botanic Garden Mount Annan

Scientific classification
- Kingdom: Plantae
- Clade: Tracheophytes
- Clade: Angiosperms
- Clade: Eudicots
- Order: Proteales
- Family: Proteaceae
- Genus: Grevillea
- Species: G. spinosa

Binomial name
- Grevillea spinosa McGill.

= Grevillea spinosa =

Species of shrub endemic to Western Australia

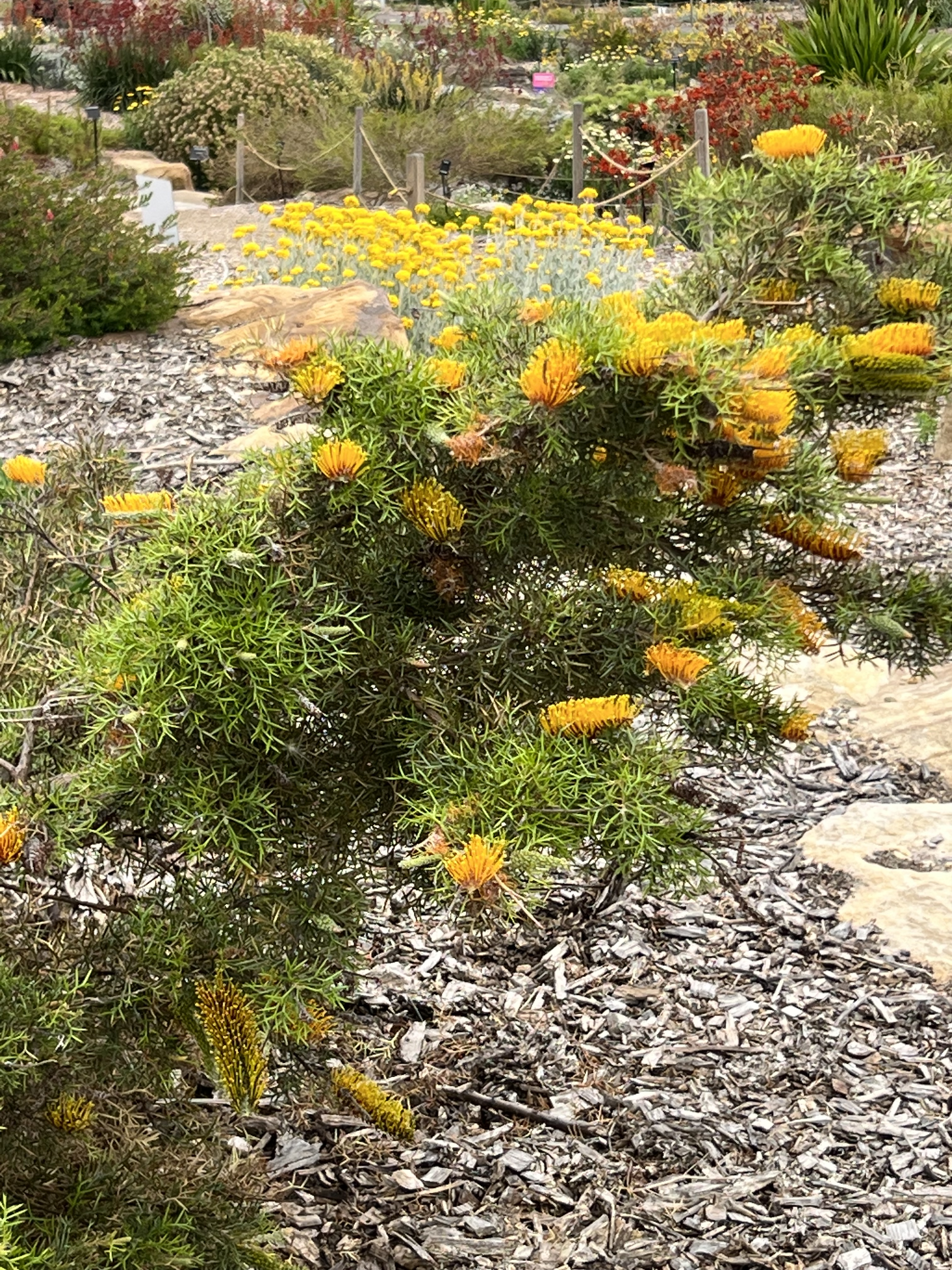
Habit

Grevillea spinosa, commonly known as tjiilka-tjiilka, is species of flowering plant in the family Proteaceae and is endemic to inland Western Australia. It is a dense, prickly shrub with mostly pinnatipartite leaves with rigid, sharply-pointed linear lobes, and erect clusters of reddish to blackish green flowers with a bright yellow to orange style.

== Description ==
Grevillea spinosa is a dense, prickly shrub that typically grows to 1–2.5 mm (0.039–0.098 in) high and 3 m (9.8 ft) wide. Its leaves are usually pinnatipartite, 30–65 mm (1.2–2.6 in) long with 5 to 11 rigid, sharply-pointed, linear lobes, the longest lobes 10–30 mm (0.39–1.18 in) long and 1.0–1.5 mm (0.039–0.059 in) wide. The edges of the leaves are rolled under, enclosing the lower surface apart from the midvein. The flower are arranged in clusters on one side of a rachis 40–90 mm (1.6–3.5 in) long and are green to fawn, later reddish to blackish green with a bright yellow to orange style, the pistil 17–22 mm (0.67–0.87 in) long. Flowering mainly occurs from May to September, and the fruit is a woolly-hairy follicle 8.5–14 mm (0.33–0.55 in) long.

== Taxonomy ==
Grevillea spinosa was first formally described by the botanist Donald McGillivray in 1986 as a part of the work New Names in Grevillea (Proteaceae) from specimens collected on the Canning Stock Route in 1942. The specific epithet (spinosa) is means "spiny", referring to the leaves.

== Distribution ==
Tjiilka-tjiilka is found around Wiluna from the Canning Stock Route to the Little Sandy Desert and as far south as Yeelirrie Station. It grows on stony ridges and in gravelly, sandy or loamy soils often over sandstone.

== Conservation status ==
This grevillea is listed as "not threatened" by the Government of Western Australia Department of Biodiversity, Conservation and Attractions.

== See also ==
- List of Grevillea species
