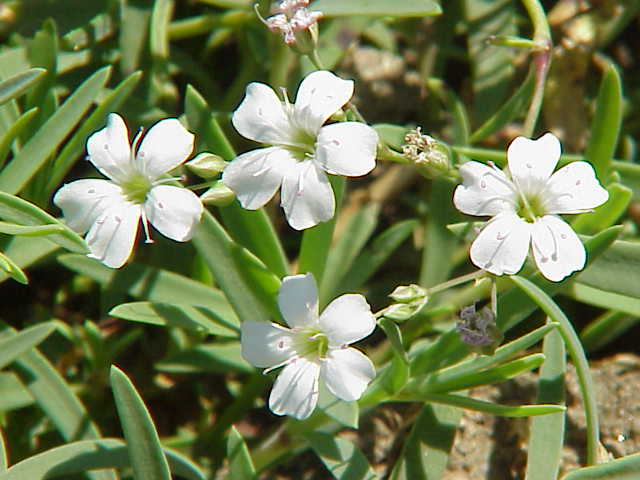

Scientific classification
- Kingdom: Plantae
- Clade: Tracheophytes
- Clade: Angiosperms
- Clade: Eudicots
- Order: Caryophyllales
- Family: Caryophyllaceae
- Genus: Gypsophila
- Species: G. repens

Binomial name
- Gypsophila repens L.

Synonyms
- Gypsophila adscendens Jacq.; Gypsophila alpestris Jord. & Fourr.; Gypsophila dubia Willd.; Gypsophila erectiuscula Jord. & Fourr.; Gypsophila sabauda Jord. & Fourr.

= Gypsophila repens =

Species of flowering plant

Gypsophila repens, the alpine gypsophila or creeping baby's breath, is a species of flowering plant in the family Caryophyllaceae, native to the mountains of central and southern Europe, where it grows on dry, chalky slopes. The Latin name literally means "creeping chalk-lover". It is a prostrate, mat-forming herbaceous perennial, growing around 20 cm (8 in) tall by 30–50 cm (12–20 in) wide. For much of the summer it bears masses of star-shaped flowers which may be white, lilac or light purple, in loose panicles.

In cultivation this plant is often grown in rock gardens or against dry stone walls. Like its relative G. paniculata, it is also used as a cut flower. It has gained the Royal Horticultural Society's Award of Garden Merit.

== Gallery ==
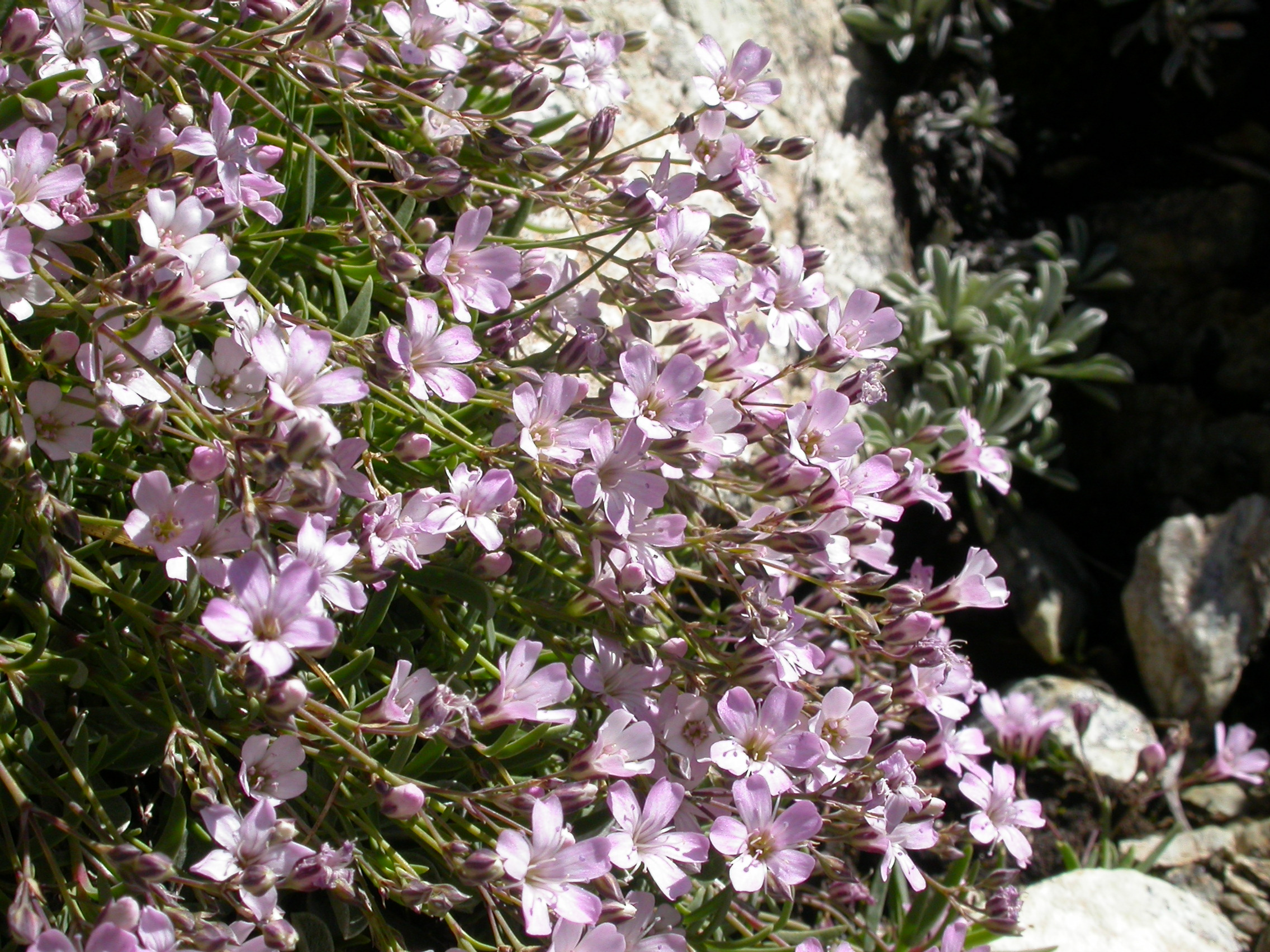
a pink-flowered single-petalled form

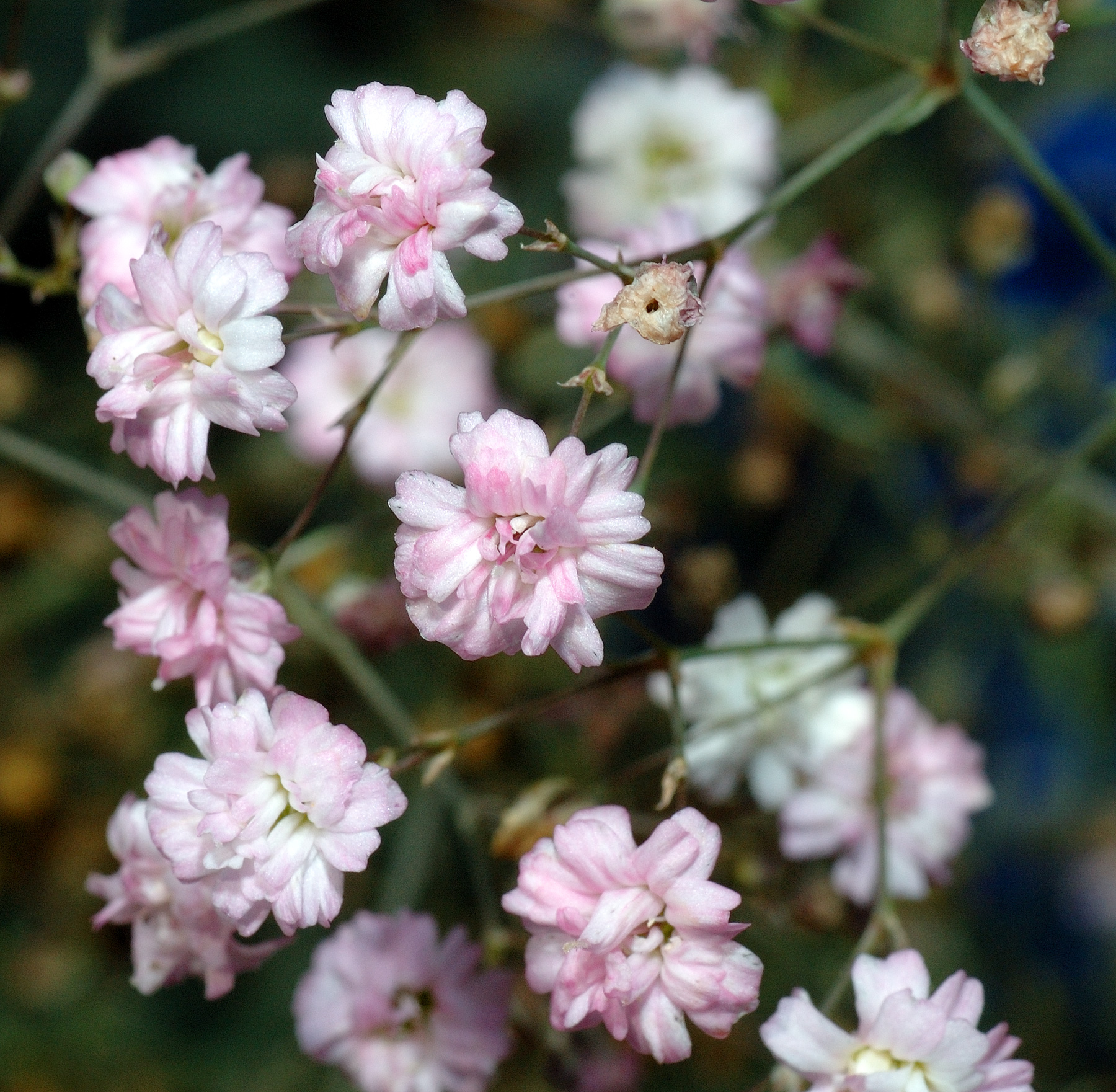
a pink-flowered double-petalled cultivated form

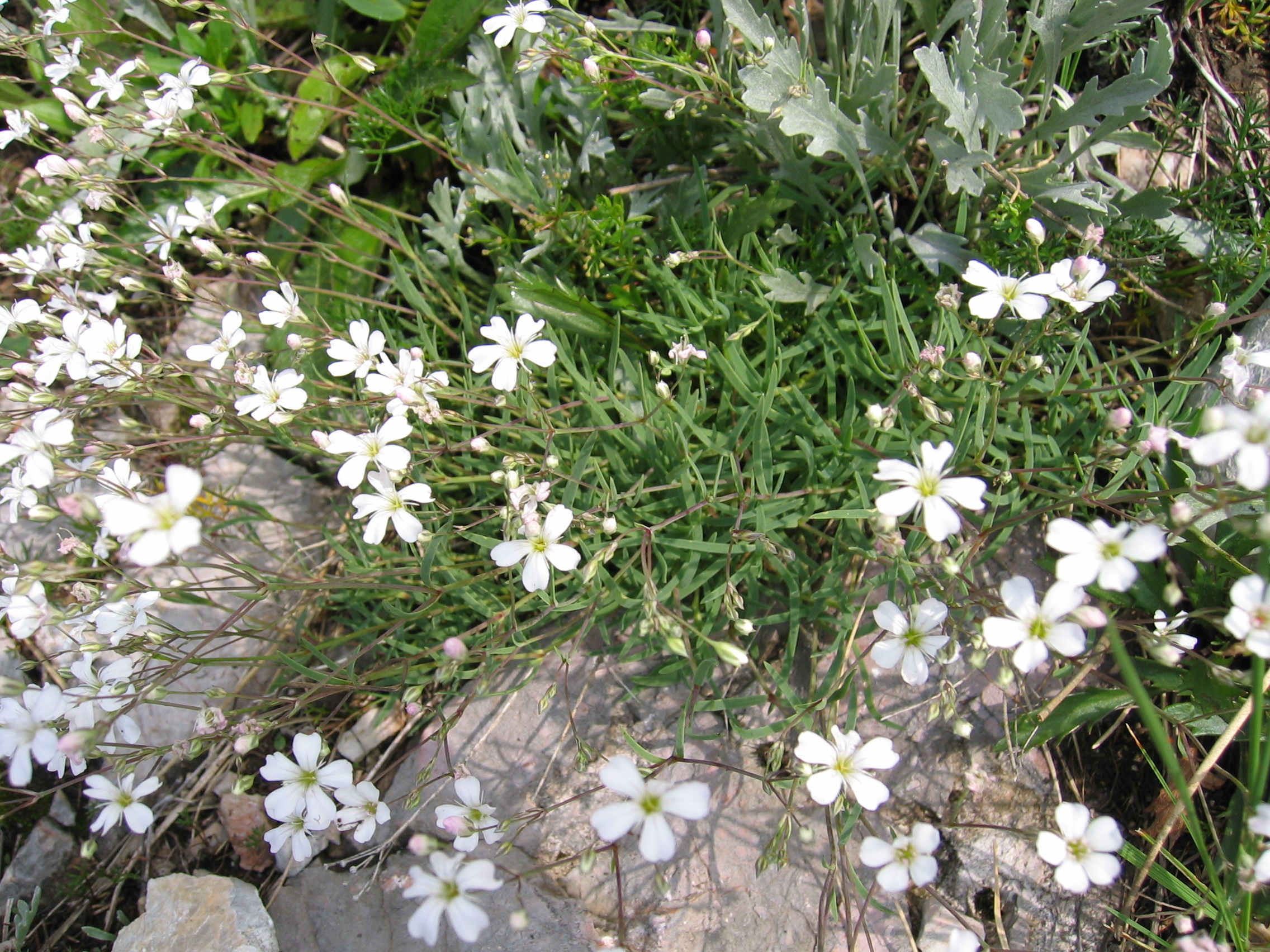
a white-flowered form

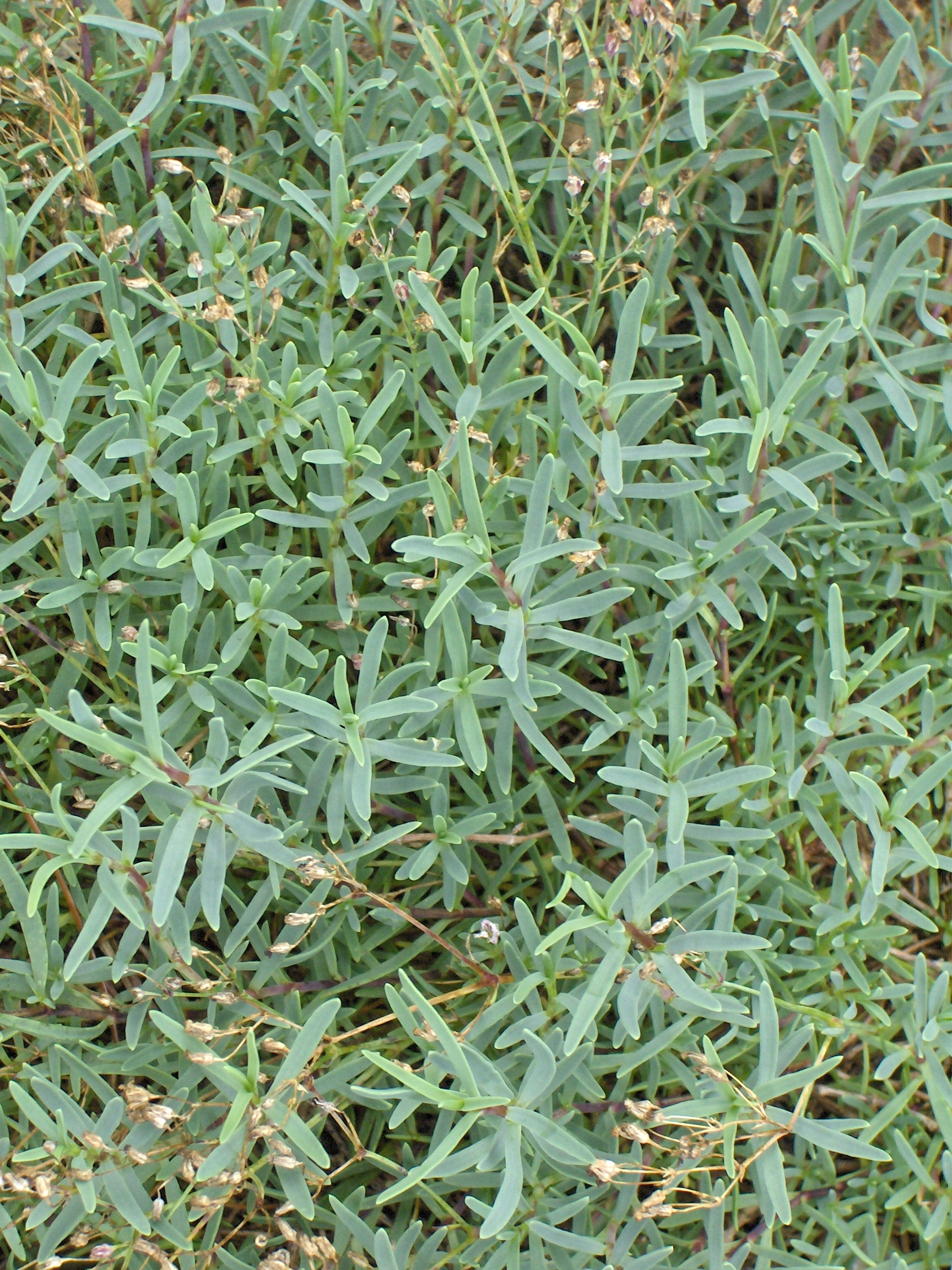
foliage
