= Gypsophila spinosa =

Scientific classification
- Kingdom: Plantae
- Clade: Tracheophytes
- Clade: Angiosperms
- Clade: Eudicots
- Order: Caryophyllales
- Family: Caryophyllaceae
- Genus: Gypsophila
- Species: G. spinosa

Binomial name
- Gypsophila spinosa D.Q.Lu

Species of flowering plant

Gypsophila spinosa is a plant species in the genus Gypsophila.
