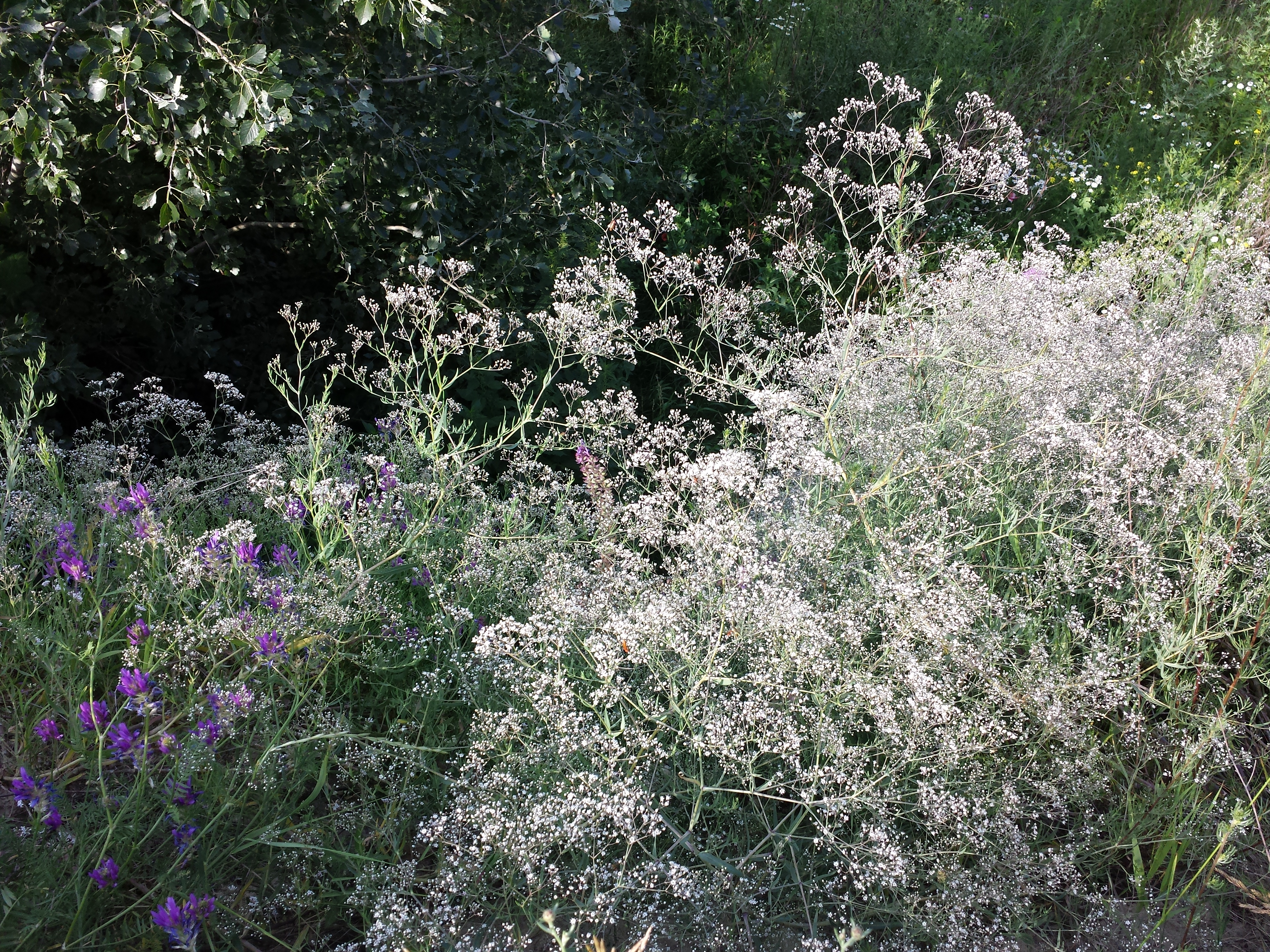

Scientific classification
- Kingdom: Plantae
- Clade: Tracheophytes
- Clade: Angiosperms
- Clade: Eudicots
- Order: Caryophyllales
- Family: Caryophyllaceae
- Genus: Gypsophila
- Species: G. paniculata

Binomial name
- Gypsophila paniculata L.

= Gypsophila paniculata =

Species of flowering plant

Gypsophila paniculata, the baby's breath, common gypsophila or panicled baby's-breath, is a species of flowering plant in the family Caryophyllaceae, native to central and eastern Europe. It is an herbaceous perennial growing to 1.2 m (4 ft) tall and wide, with mounds of branching stems covered in clouds of tiny white flowers in summer (hence the common name "baby's breath"). Another possible source of this name is its scent, which has been described as sour milk, like a baby's "spit-up". Its natural habitat is on the Steppes in dry, sandy and stony places, often on calcareous soils (gypsophila = "chalk-loving"). Specimens of this plant were first sent to Linnaeus from St. Petersburg by the Swiss-Russian botanist Johann Amman.

== Cultivation ==
It is a popular ornamental garden subject, and thrives in well-drained alkaline to neutral soils in full sun. Numerous cultivars have been selected, of which 'Rosenschleier' (with pale pink double flowers) has gained the Royal Horticultural Society's Award of Garden Merit.

== Toxicity ==
Gypsophila paniculata is toxic to humans, and can cause contact dermatitis.

== Floristry ==
Gypsophila paniculata is much used in the floristry trade (where it is often simply called "gyp") providing an effective backdrop for larger or more structured blooms. It is commercially cultivated in Peru, forming a major portion of that country's flower exports. It is commonly grown and sold for corsages in the United States.

== Invasive ==
Gypsophila paniculata is now widely distributed in North America. It is classed as an invasive species in places around the Great Lakes, such as the Sleeping Bear Dunes National Lakeshore and the Chicago region, in the Pacific Northwest, and California where it is a declared noxious weed.

== Pests and diseases ==
Root development is completely inhibited by Pantoea agglomerans pv. glysophilae. Both Pag and Pantoea agglomerans pv. betae cause gall formation. Pag is a problem for the floral industry, for example in the Israeli industry.

== Gallery ==
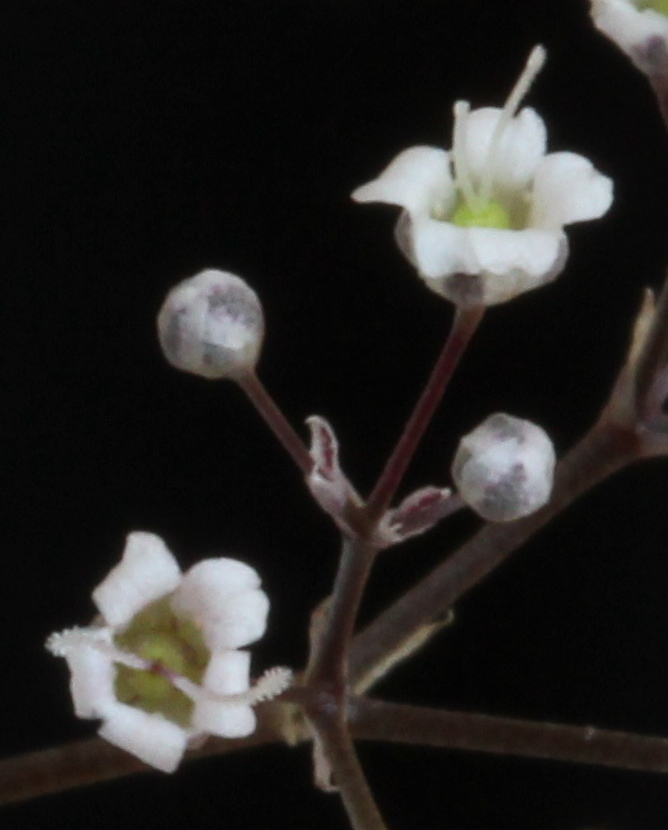
Close-up view of two flowers

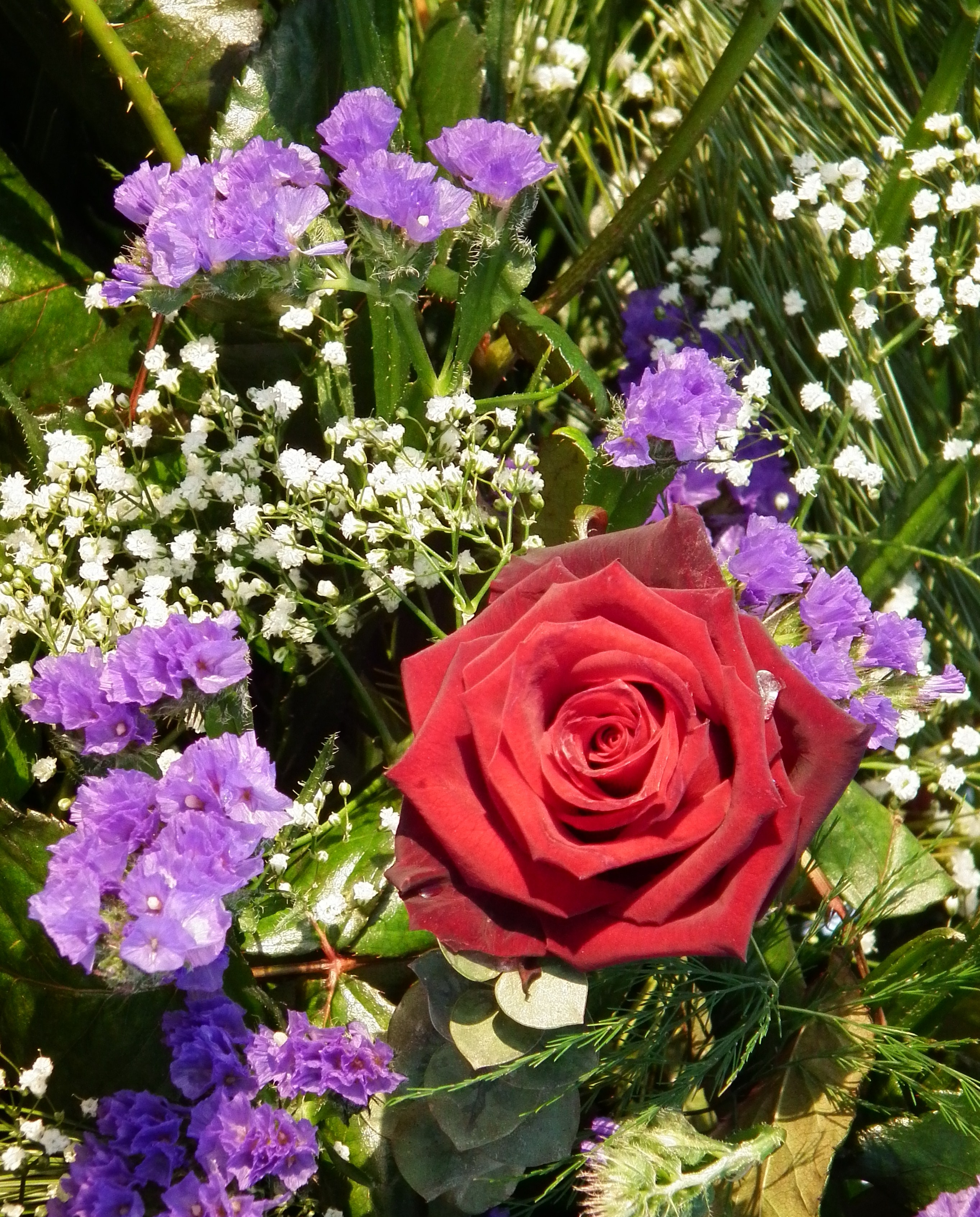
Use in flower arrangement (white)

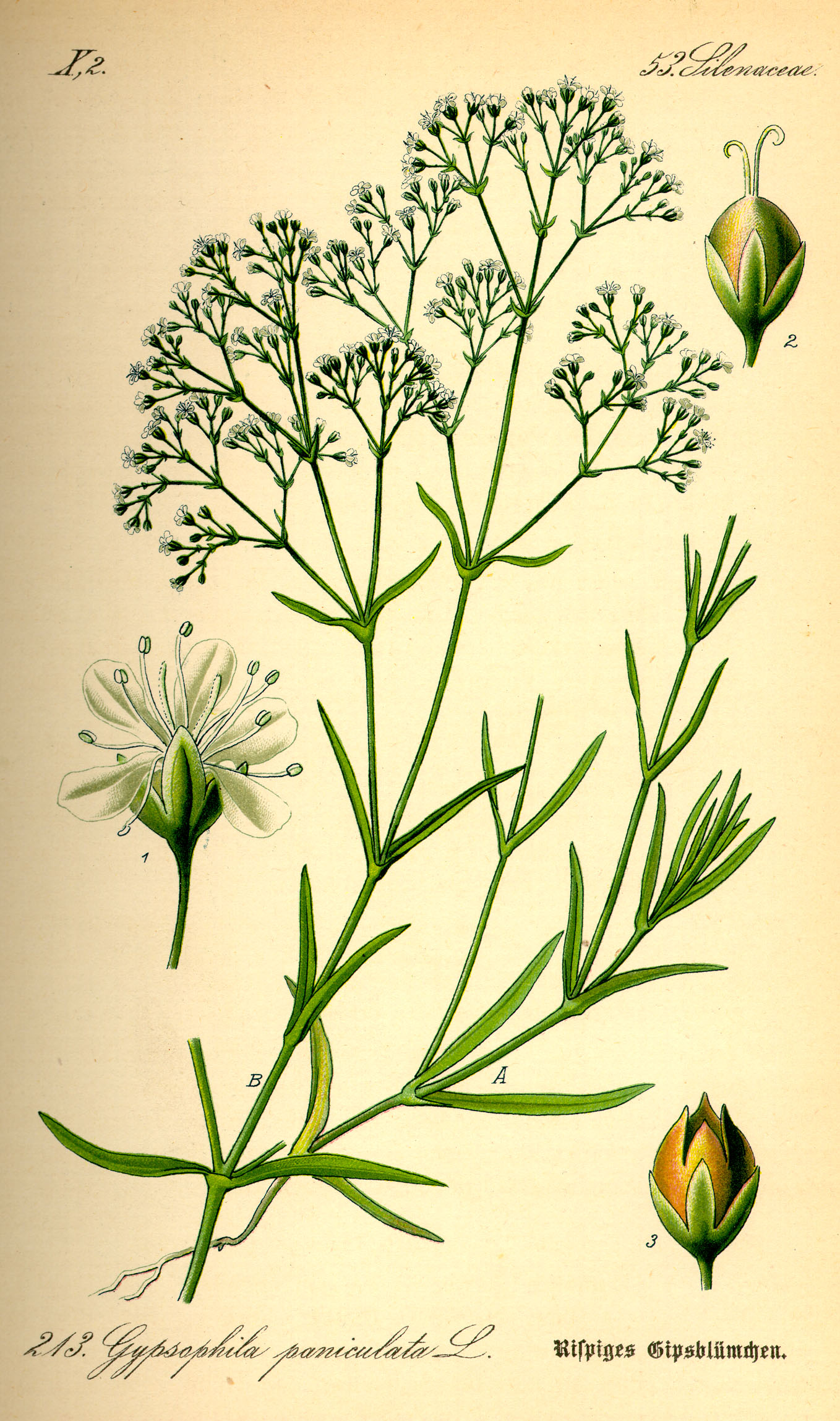
Illustration by Otto Wilhelm Thomé
