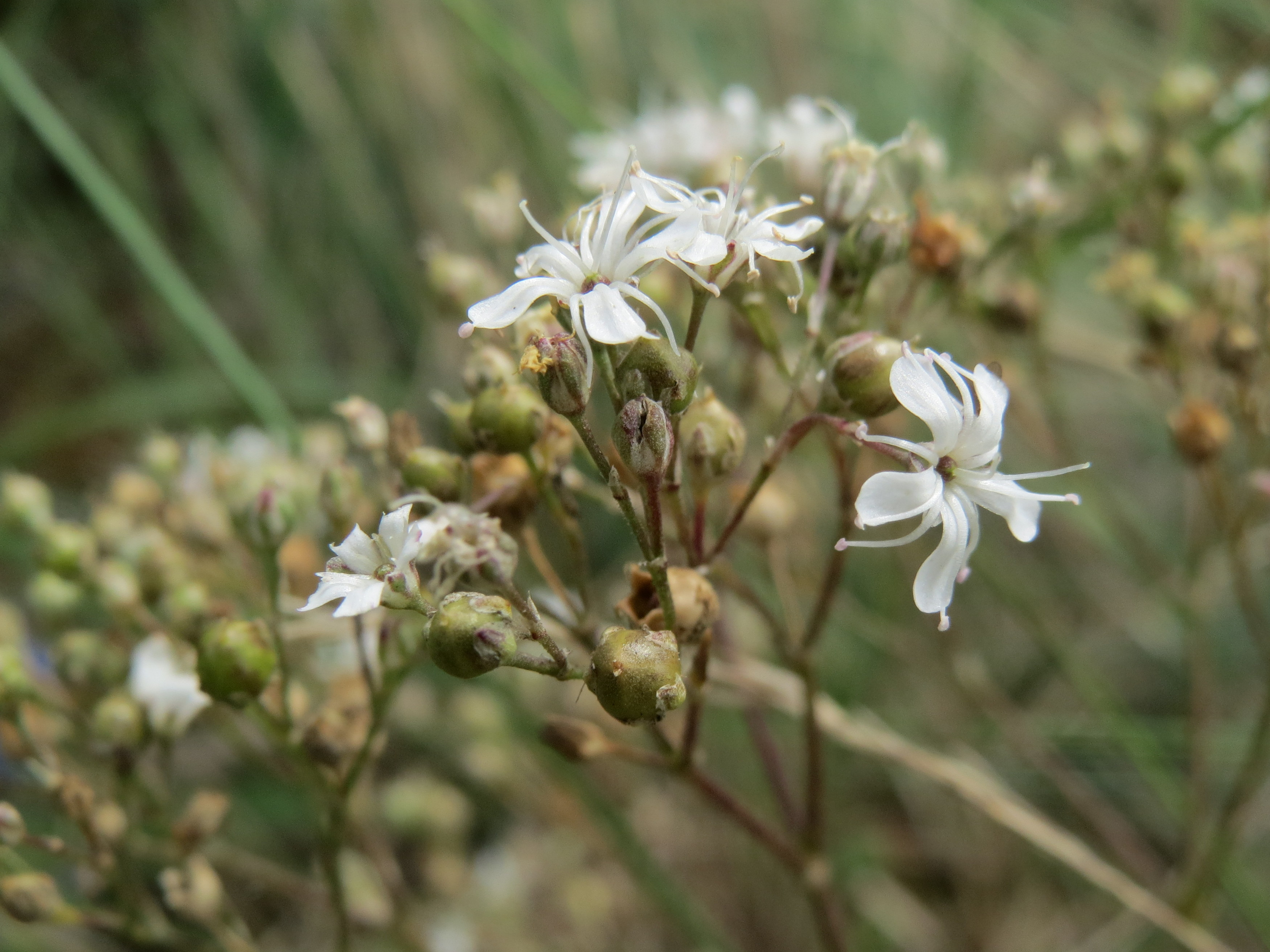

Scientific classification
- Kingdom: Plantae
- Clade: Tracheophytes
- Clade: Angiosperms
- Clade: Eudicots
- Order: Caryophyllales
- Family: Caryophyllaceae
- Genus: Gypsophila
- Species: G. fastigiata

Binomial name
- Gypsophila fastigiata L., 1753

= Gypsophila fastigiata =

Species of flowering plant

Gypsophila fastigiata, the fastigiate gypsophila, is a species of flowering plant of the family Caryophyllaceae.
