= Cornifrons phasma =

Scientific classification
- Kingdom: Animalia
- Phylum: Arthropoda
- Class: Insecta
- Order: Lepidoptera
- Family: Crambidae
- Genus: Cornifrons
- Species: C. phasma

Binomial name
- Cornifrons phasma Dyar, 1917

Synonyms
- Cornifrons phasma var. chlorophasma Dyar, 1917

Species of moth

Cornifrons phasma is a moth in the family Crambidae. It was described by Harrison Gray Dyar Jr. in 1917. It is found in North America, where it has been recorded from California and Nevada.

Adults are on wing from April to June and in September.
