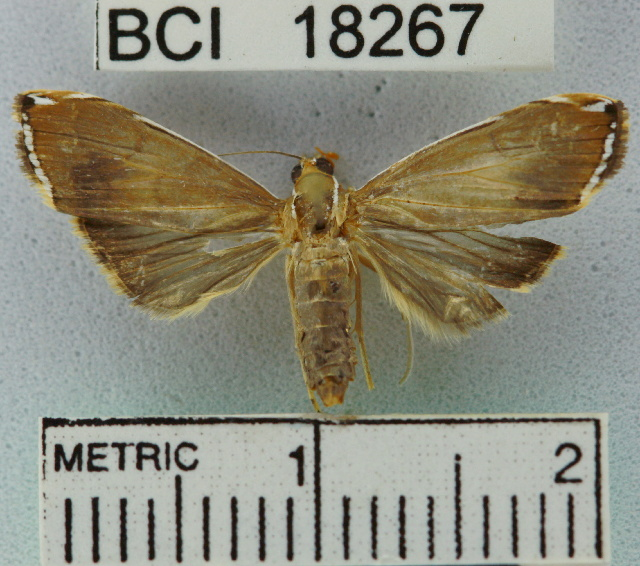

Scientific classification
- Kingdom: Animalia
- Phylum: Arthropoda
- Class: Insecta
- Order: Lepidoptera
- Family: Crambidae
- Genus: Trischistognatha
- Species: T. palindialis

Binomial name
- Trischistognatha palindialis (Guenée, 1854)

Synonyms
- Spilodes palindialis Guenée, 1854

= Trischistognatha palindialis =

Species of moth

Trischistognatha palindialis is a moth in the family Crambidae. It was described by Achille Guenée in 1854. It is found in Brazil and Panama.
