= Prorasea pulveralis =

Scientific classification
- Kingdom: Animalia
- Phylum: Arthropoda
- Class: Insecta
- Order: Lepidoptera
- Family: Crambidae
- Genus: Prorasea
- Species: P. pulveralis

Binomial name
- Prorasea pulveralis (Warren, 1892)

Synonyms
- Cornifrons pulveralis Warren, 1892

Species of moth

Prorasea pulveralis is a moth in the family Crambidae. It was described by Warren in 1892. It is found in North America, where it has been recorded from California, Colorado and Nevada.
