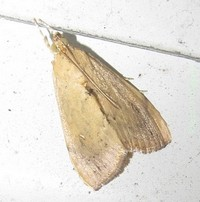

Scientific classification
- Kingdom: Animalia
- Phylum: Arthropoda
- Clade: Pancrustacea
- Class: Insecta
- Order: Lepidoptera
- Family: Crambidae
- Subfamily: Evergestinae
- Genus: Crocidolomia; Zeller, 1852

Synonyms
- Godara Walker, 1859; Pseudopisara Shiraki, 1913; Tchahbaharia Amsel, 1951

= Crocidolomia =

Genus of moths

Crocidolomia is a genus of moths of the family Crambidae.

== Species ==
- Crocidolomia luteolalis Hampson, 1893
- Crocidolomia pavonana (Fabricius, 1794)
- Crocidolomia subhirsutalis Schaus, 1927
- Crocidolomia suffusalis Hampson, 1891
