= Prorasea praeia =

Scientific classification
- Kingdom: Animalia
- Phylum: Arthropoda
- Class: Insecta
- Order: Lepidoptera
- Family: Crambidae
- Genus: Prorasea
- Species: P. praeia

Binomial name
- Prorasea praeia (Dyar, 1917)

Synonyms
- Cornifrons simalis var. praeia Dyar, 1917

Species of moth

Prorasea praeia is a moth in the family Crambidae. It was described by Harrison Gray Dyar Jr. in 1917. It is found in North America, where it has been recorded from Arizona, British Columbia, California and Montana.
