= Prorasea fernaldi =

Scientific classification
- Domain: Eukaryota
- Kingdom: Animalia
- Phylum: Arthropoda
- Class: Insecta
- Order: Lepidoptera
- Family: Crambidae
- Genus: Prorasea
- Species: P. fernaldi

Binomial name
- Prorasea fernaldi Munroe, 1974

Species of moth

Prorasea fernaldi is a moth in the family of Crambidae. It was described by Eugene G. Munroe in 1974. It is found in North America, where it has been recorded from Colorado, New Mexico and Wyoming.
