= Cornifrons actualis =

Scientific classification
- Domain: Eukaryota
- Kingdom: Animalia
- Phylum: Arthropoda
- Class: Insecta
- Order: Lepidoptera
- Family: Crambidae
- Genus: Cornifrons
- Species: C. actualis

Binomial name
- Cornifrons actualis Barnes & McDunnough, 1918

Species of moth

Cornifrons actualis is a moth in the family Crambidae. It was described by William Barnes and James Halliday McDunnough in 1918. It is found in North America, where it has been recorded from Arizona, California, Montana, Nevada, Texas and Utah. The habitat consists of deserts.

The wingspan is about 28 mm. The forewings are white, suffused with gray in the lower half and subterminally. The hindwings are whitish, shaded with smoky at the outer margin. Adults have been recorded on wing from February to April and in August.
