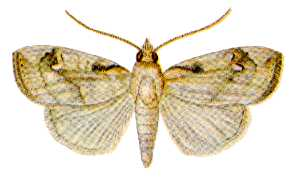

Scientific classification
- Kingdom: Animalia
- Phylum: Arthropoda
- Clade: Pancrustacea
- Class: Insecta
- Order: Lepidoptera
- Family: Crambidae
- Genus: Crocidolomia
- Species: C. pavonana

Binomial name
- Crocidolomia pavonana (Fabricius, 1794)

Synonyms
- Crocidolomia binotalis Zeller, 1852; Pionea comalis Guenée, 1854; Pionea incomalis Guenée, 1854; Pseudopisara quadripunctata Shiraki, 1913; Tchahbaharia dentalis Amsel, 1951

= Crocidolomia pavonana =

Species of moth

Crocidolomia pavonana is a moth of the family Crambidae. Its caterpillar is a crop pest and is known as the croci or the cabbage cluster caterpillar. This moth is found in Africa and Asia, its range extending from South Africa through India to the Pacific Ocean, including Australia. The wingspan is about 25 mm (1 in). The larvae feed on Brassicaceae species and are considered an agricultural pest on cabbages. The species was first described by Johan Christian Fabricius in 1794.

== Description ==
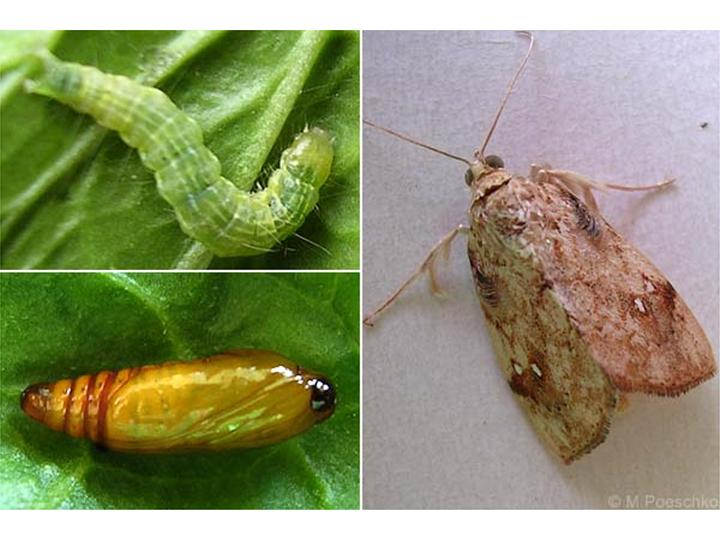
Life cycle

The adult male is between 11 and 14 mm (0.43 and 0.55 in) long with a wingspan of 20 to 25 mm (0.8 to 1.0 in), and the female is slightly smaller. Both are rather variable in colouring but have brownish markings on a cream background. The male can be distinguished by the tufts of dark-coloured hairs at the front of the forewings.

The eggs are pale green and up to three hundred are laid in an overlapping pile that may be 5 mm (0.2 in) in diameter. The larvae are grey with dark heads when they hatch and later become green with dark heads and five fine pale yellow longitudinal stripes. The pupa is cylindrical, olive green to light brown, becoming darker shortly before emergence. It is surrounded by a silken cocoon.

== Distribution and host plants ==
Crocidolomia pavonana is found in the tropical and subtropical areas of Africa, Asia and Australia. Its range extends from South Africa and Madagascar through India, Thailand, Taiwan, Indonesia and the Philippines to northern Australia.

Host plants eaten by the larvae include the brassicaceous plants Brassica oleracea and Brassica rapa and their varieties, but also cotton (Gossypium), pigeon pea (Cajanus cajan), Gynandropsis, nasturtium (Tropaeolum) and radish (Raphanus).

== Damage ==
The eggs take about four days to hatch. The young larvae feed on the underside of the leaf on which they hatch before moving on to other parts of the plant. They pass through five instars over a period of about twelve days, burrowing into the centre of the plant after about four days. If the apical meristem is damaged, multiple heads may be produced or the plant may die. The larvae from a single egg cluster can destroy a whole cabbage or cauliflower plant.

== Ecology ==
In tests in Uganda it was determined that when offered six brassicaceous crops, white cabbage, broccoli, cauliflower, kale, Chinese cabbage and Indian mustard, the insect preferred to lay its eggs on Chinese cabbage and broccoli. Offered the choice of Chinese cabbage and white cabbage, the reduction of egg laying on the white cabbage ranged from 69 to 100%.

Several parasitoids are known to attack the larvae of this moth in different parts of its range. These include braconid wasps and tachinid flies, and in India the larvae are preyed on by a predatory bug in the family Pentatomidae.
