= Trischistognatha ochritacta =

Scientific classification
- Kingdom: Animalia
- Phylum: Arthropoda
- Class: Insecta
- Order: Lepidoptera
- Family: Crambidae
- Genus: Trischistognatha
- Species: T. ochritacta

Binomial name
- Trischistognatha ochritacta (Dyar, 1913)

Synonyms
- Crocidolomia ochritacta Dyar, 1913; Trischistognatha ochrilecta

Species of moth

Trischistognatha ochritacta is a moth in the family Crambidae. It is found in Mexico.

The wingspan is about 27 mm. The forewings are shining olive brown. The hindwings are brownish semitranslucent with a black outer band.
