= Trischistognatha limatalis =

Scientific classification
- Domain: Eukaryota
- Kingdom: Animalia
- Phylum: Arthropoda
- Class: Insecta
- Order: Lepidoptera
- Family: Crambidae
- Genus: Trischistognatha
- Species: T. limatalis

Binomial name
- Trischistognatha limatalis (Schaus, 1912)

Synonyms
- Crocidolomia limatalis Schaus, 1912; Trischistognatha limitalia

Species of moth

Trischistognatha limatalis is a moth in the family Crambidae. It is found in Costa Rica.

The wingspan is about 31 mm. The forewings are silky brown, tinged with dull red. The hindwings are silky brown, with darker veins.
