= Prorasea simalis =

Scientific classification
- Kingdom: Animalia
- Phylum: Arthropoda
- Class: Insecta
- Order: Lepidoptera
- Family: Crambidae
- Genus: Prorasea
- Species: P. simalis

Binomial name
- Prorasea simalis Grote, 1878

Species of moth

Prorasea simalis is a moth in the family Crambidae. It was described by Augustus Radcliffe Grote in 1878. It is found in North America, where it has been recorded from Alberta, California, Colorado, Nevada and Oregon.

The wingspan is 22 mm for males and 26–29 mm for females. Adults are variable in color, ranging from ocherous to fuscous or blackish. There are indistinct oblique lines on the forewings, flecked with white. The median lines are dark, the subterminal area is fuscous or ocherous and the subterminal shade is white. The hindwings are smoky fuscous, but paler at the base. Adults have been recorded on wing from March to August.
