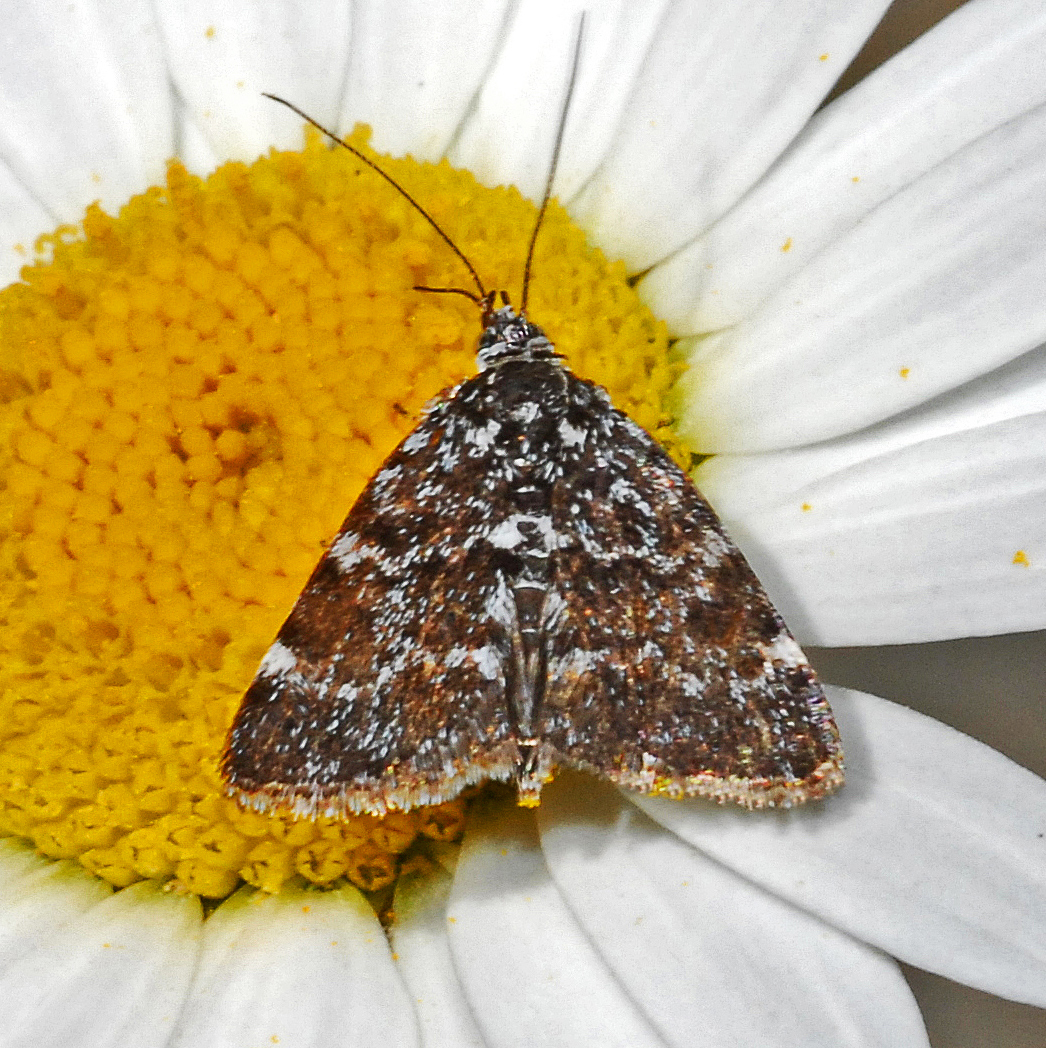
- Orenaia alpestralis. Adult

Scientific classification
- Domain: Eukaryota
- Kingdom: Animalia
- Phylum: Arthropoda
- Class: Insecta
- Order: Lepidoptera
- Family: Crambidae
- Genus: Orenaia
- Species: O. alpestralis

Binomial name
- Orenaia alpestralis (Fabricius, 1787)

Synonyms
- List: Phalaena alpestralis Fabricius, 1787; Orenaia alpestralis canigouensis P. Leraut, 2003; Crambus alpestris Fabricius, 1798; Orenaia alpestralis preisseckeri Rebel, 1903; Orenaia alpestralis var. kautzi Hauder, 1910; Pyralis tristana Fabricius, 1794; Pyralis rupestralis Geyer in Hübner, 1833

= Orenaia alpestralis =

Species of moth

Orenaia alpestralis is a species of moth in the family Crambidae.

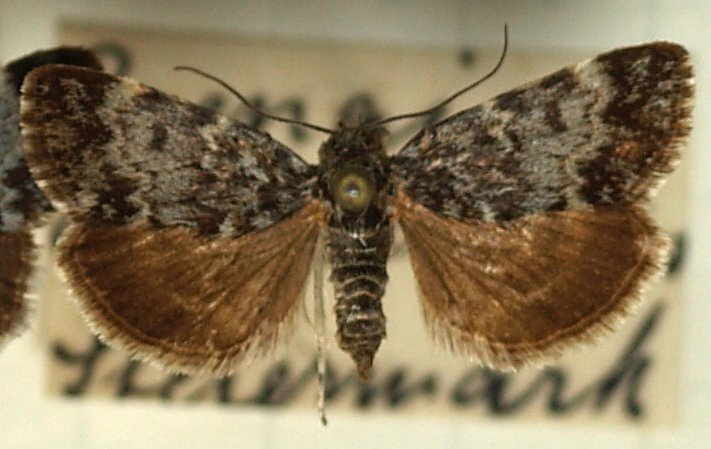
Mounted specimen

== Distribution ==
This species can be found in the Pyrenees, the Alps, the Balkan Peninsula and in the Carpathians. It occurs in Spain, France, Italy, Switzerland, Austria, Germany, Poland, Slovakia, Slovenia, Romania, Bulgaria, the Republic of Macedonia, Albania and Russia.

== Description ==
Orenaia alpestralis has a wingspan of 16–20 mm. The labial palps are black, white banded and ventrally predominantly white. Head and body are black and mixed with white hairy scales. The abdomen shows white intersegment rings. The forewings are pale bluish gray, mixed with black or dark brown spots. The mixing is particularly strong in the basal third and in the subterminal area. The intensity of the dark mottling on the front wing top is rather variable. The narrow, white toothed subbasal, anti-median, and post-median lines are either fairly distinct, or more or less obliterated by black spots, so that only at the costal edge the beginning of the transverse lines is recognizable. The discal stain is small and clear, kidney or "8" -shaped. The fringed scales are white and brownish. The undersides of the forewings are dull gray and shiny. The upperside of the hind wings are brown, with an indistinct pale and curved transverse line. The undersides of the hind wings are similarly colored, but speckled with dark scales and darker close to the edges.

== Biology ==
Adult moths can be found in July–August. The full grown caterpillars can reach a length of 20–22 mm. They are reddish gray, with thin longitudinal lines and long pale bristles. The head is brown and black on the sides. The prothorax is brown and speckled with some black spots. The pupa is brown, slim and finely sculpted, with a size of 9.5 × 2.3 millimeters.

The caterpillars develop on Brassicaceae. The feed only during the night eating both fresh and dried leaves. The caterpillars hibernate in a hibernaculum from October to March and complete the development in the coming year until June. They mate in a cocoon.
