= Evergestella =

Scientific classification
- Domain: Eukaryota
- Kingdom: Animalia
- Phylum: Arthropoda
- Class: Insecta
- Order: Lepidoptera
- Family: Crambidae
- Subfamily: Evergestinae
- Genus: Evergestella; Munroe, 1974
- Species: E. evincalis

Binomial name
- Evergestella evincalis (Möschler, 1890)

Synonyms
- Botys evincalis Möschler, 1890

Genus of moths

Evergestella is a genus of moths of the family Crambidae. It contains only one species, Evergestella evincalis, which is found in Florida, as well as on the Cayman Islands, Cuba, Puerto Rico and Jamaica.
