= Orenaia alticolalis =

Scientific classification
- Domain: Eukaryota
- Kingdom: Animalia
- Phylum: Arthropoda
- Class: Insecta
- Order: Lepidoptera
- Family: Crambidae
- Genus: Orenaia
- Species: O. alticolalis

Binomial name
- Orenaia alticolalis (Barnes & McDunnough, 1914)

Synonyms
- Titanio alticolalis Barnes & McDunnough, 1914

Species of moth

Orenaia alticolalis is a moth in the family Crambidae. It was described by William Barnes and James Halliday McDunnough in 1914. It is found in North America, where it has been recorded from Alberta and Colorado.
