= Orenaia macneilli =

Scientific classification
- Domain: Eukaryota
- Kingdom: Animalia
- Phylum: Arthropoda
- Class: Insecta
- Order: Lepidoptera
- Family: Crambidae
- Genus: Orenaia
- Species: O. macneilli

Binomial name
- Orenaia macneilli Munroe, 1974

Species of moth

Orenaia macneilli is a moth in the family Crambidae. It was described by Eugene G. Munroe in 1974. It is found in North America, where it has been recorded from California.

The wingspan is about 23 mm. Adults have been recorded on wing in August.
