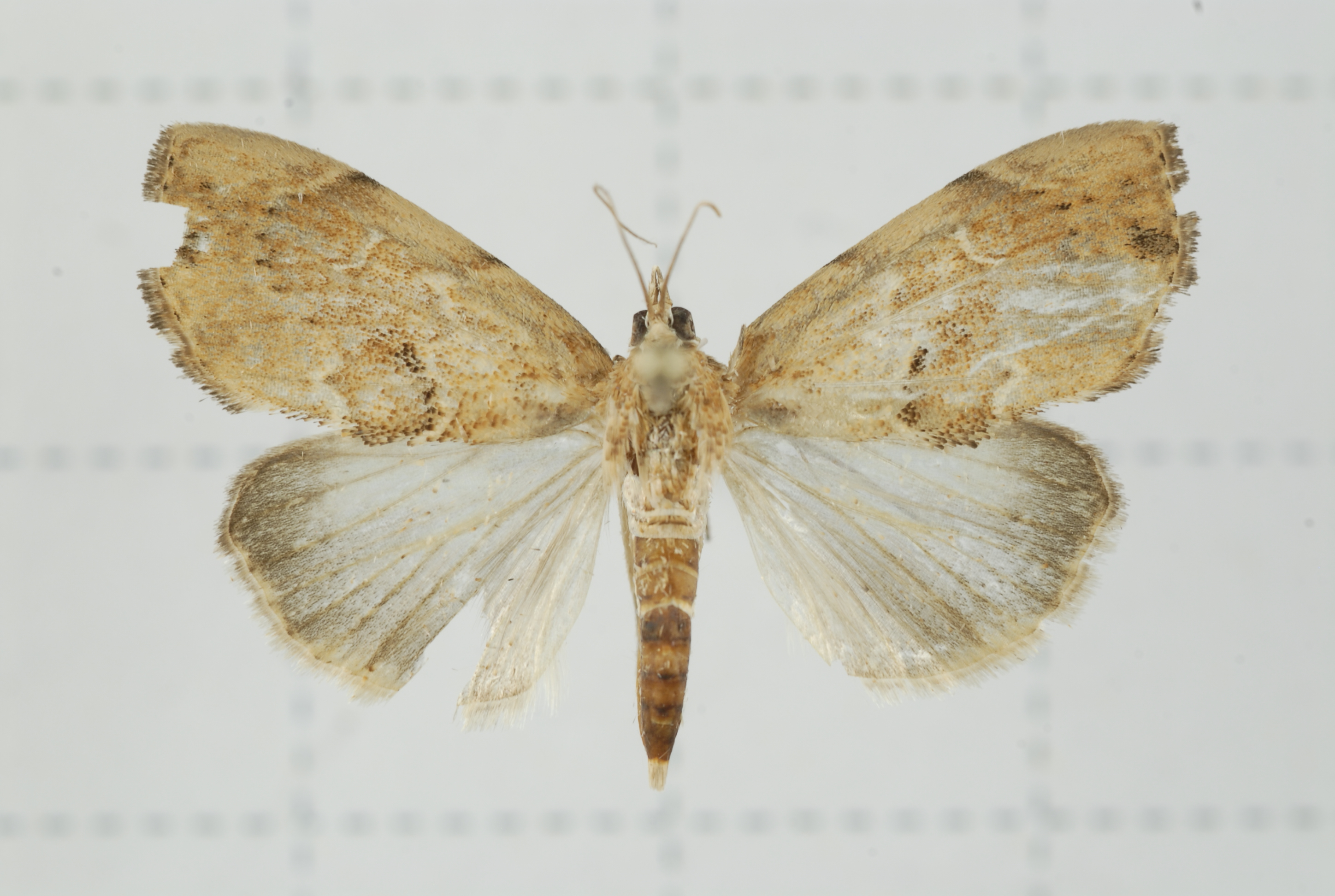

Scientific classification
- Kingdom: Animalia
- Phylum: Arthropoda
- Clade: Pancrustacea
- Class: Insecta
- Order: Lepidoptera
- Family: Crambidae
- Genus: Crocidolomia
- Species: C. subhirsutalis

Binomial name
- Crocidolomia subhirsutalis Schaus, 1927

= Crocidolomia subhirsutalis =

Species of moth

Crocidolomia subhirsutalis is a moth species belonging to the family Crambidae. It was described by William Schaus in 1927 and is native to (Luzon) in the Philippines.
