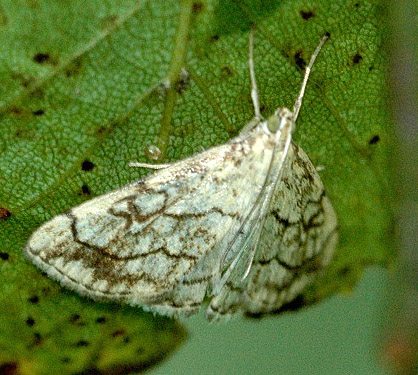
- Evergestis pallidata

Scientific classification
- Domain: Eukaryota
- Kingdom: Animalia
- Phylum: Arthropoda
- Class: Insecta
- Order: Lepidoptera
- Family: Crambidae
- Subfamily: Evergestinae; Marion, 1952

Genera
- 10, see text

= Evergestinae =

Subfamily of moths

Evergestinae is a fairly small subfamily of the lepidopteran family Crambidae, the crambid snout moths. The subfamily was described by H. Marion in 1952. It contains roughly 140 species on all continents and continental islands. Evergestine moths resemble Pyraustinae; however, the male genitalia have a long uncus and long, slender gnathos. The larvae feed mostly on Brassicaceae.

Taxonomists' opinions differ as to the correct placement of the Crambidae, some authorities treating them as a subfamily (Crambinae) of the family Pyralidae. If this is done, Evergestinae is usually treated as a separate subfamily within Pyralidae.

== Genera ==
- Cornifrons Lederer, 1858 (= Ventosalis Marion, 1957)
- Crocidolomia Zeller, 1852 (= Godara Walker, 1859, Pseudopisara Shiraki, 1913, Tchahbaharia Amsel, 1951)
- Cylindrifrons Munroe, 1951
- Evergestella Munroe, 1974
- Evergestis Hübner, 1825 (= Aedis Grote, 1878, Paraedis Grote, 1882, Paroedis Hampson, 1899, Euergestis Warren, 1892, Euergestis Rebel, 1906–07, Homochroa Hübner, 1825, Maelinoptera Staudinger, 1893, Mesographe Hübner, 1825, Orobena Guenée, 1854, Pachyzancloides Matsumura, 1925, Pionea Duponchel, 1845, Reskovitsia Szent-Ivány, 1942, Scopolia Hübner, 1825)
- Orenaia Duponchel, 1845
- Prorasea Grote, 1878
- Symphysa Hampson, (1898) 1899
- Trischistognatha Warren, 1892

== See also ==
- List of crambid genera
