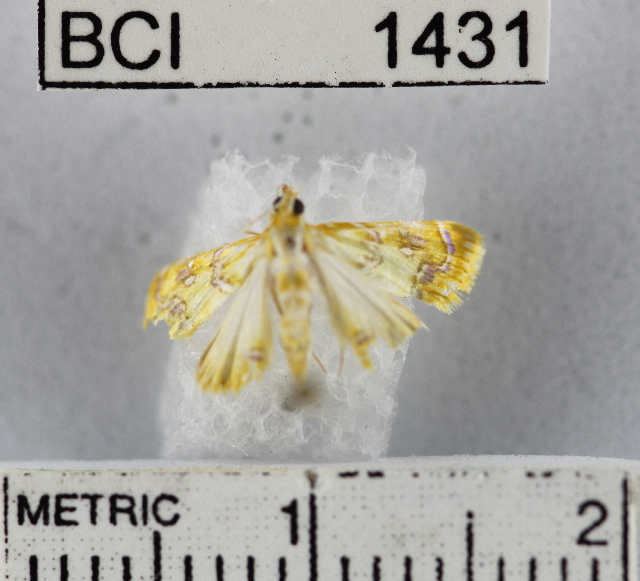

Scientific classification
- Kingdom: Animalia
- Phylum: Arthropoda
- Class: Insecta
- Order: Lepidoptera
- Family: Crambidae
- Genus: Symphysa
- Species: S. amoenalis

Binomial name
- Symphysa amoenalis (Walker, 1862)

Synonyms
- Oligostigma amoenalis Walker, 1862

= Symphysa amoenalis =

Species of moth

Symphysa amoenalis is a moth in the family Crambidae. It is found in Brazil and Panama.
