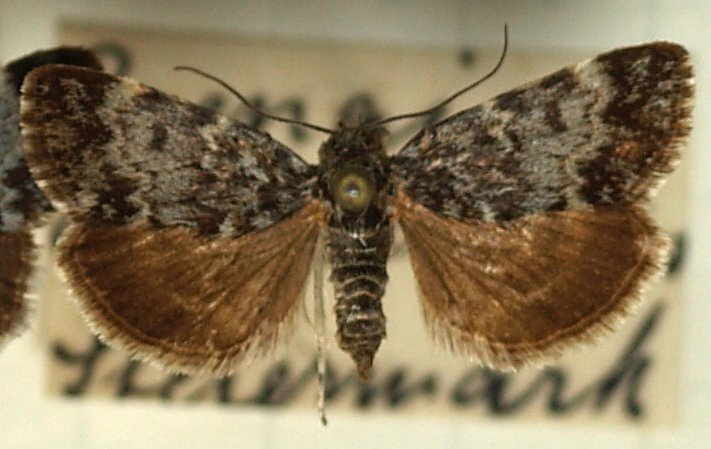
- Orenaia alpestralis.

Scientific classification
- Domain: Eukaryota
- Kingdom: Animalia
- Phylum: Arthropoda
- Class: Insecta
- Order: Lepidoptera
- Family: Crambidae
- Subfamily: Evergestinae
- Genus: Orenaia; Duponchel, 1845

= Orenaia =

Genus of moths

Orenaia is a genus of moths of the family Crambidae.

== Species ==
- Orenaia alpestralis (Fabricius, 1787)
- Orenaia alticolalis (Barnes & McDunnough, 1914)
- Orenaia andereggialis (Herrich-Schäffer, 1851)
- Orenaia arcticalis Munroe, 1974
- Orenaia coloradalis Barnes & McDunnough, 1914
- Orenaia helveticalis (Herrich-Schäffer, 1851)
- Orenaia lugubralis (Lederer, 1857)
- Orenaia macneilli Munroe, 1974
- Orenaia pallidivittalis Munroe, 1956
- Orenaia sierralis Munroe, 1974
- Orenaia trivialis Barnes & McDunnough, 1914
