= Trischistognatha pyrenealis =

Scientific classification
- Kingdom: Animalia
- Phylum: Arthropoda
- Class: Insecta
- Order: Lepidoptera
- Family: Crambidae
- Genus: Trischistognatha
- Species: T. pyrenealis

Binomial name
- Trischistognatha pyrenealis (Walker, 1859)

Synonyms
- Botys pyrenealis Walker, 1859; Botys medonalis Walker, 1859; Evergestis dyaralis Fernald, 1901; Orobena implicitalis Moeschler 1890

Species of moth

Trischistognatha pyrenealis is a moth in the family Crambidae. It was described by Francis Walker in 1859. It is found in Mexico, Central America (including Belize, Costa Rica and Honduras), the West Indies (including the Dominican Republic, Jamaica, Puerto Rico and Cuba) and the southeastern United States, where it has been recorded from Georgia to Florida and from Alabama to Texas.

The wingspan is 20–21 mm. Adults are on wing from January to August in the southern United States.

The larvae feed on Drypetes lateriflora in Florida.
