= Orenaia helveticalis =

Scientific classification
- Domain: Eukaryota
- Kingdom: Animalia
- Phylum: Arthropoda
- Class: Insecta
- Order: Lepidoptera
- Family: Crambidae
- Genus: Orenaia
- Species: O. helveticalis

Binomial name
- Orenaia helveticalis (Herrich-Schaffer, 1851)

Synonyms
- Hercyna helveticalis Herrich-Schaffer, 1851; Hercyna albescens Galvagni, 1926; Orenaia albescens (Galvagni, 1926); Orenaia conspurcalis de la Harpe; Orenaia lugubralis Lederer, 1857

Species of moth

Orenaia helveticalis is a species of moth in the family Crambidae. It is found in Europe, with records from Spain, France, Italy, Switzerland, Austria, Slovenia and Germany.

== Subspecies ==
There are four subspecies:

- Orenaia helveticalis helveticalis
- Orenaia helveticalis ventosalis Chrétien, 1911 (France)
- Orenaia helveticalis gedralis P. Leraut, 1996
- Orenaia helveticalis murinalis G. Leraut in G. Leraut & P. Leraut, 2011
