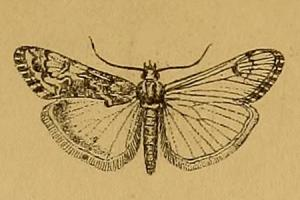

Scientific classification
- Domain: Eukaryota
- Kingdom: Animalia
- Phylum: Arthropoda
- Class: Insecta
- Order: Lepidoptera
- Family: Crambidae
- Subfamily: Evergestinae
- Genus: Cornifrons; Lederer, 1858

Synonyms
- Ventosalis Marion, 1957

= Cornifrons =

Genus of moths

Cornifrons is a genus of moths of the family Crambidae.

== Species ==
- Cornifrons actualis Barnes & McDunnough, 1918
- Cornifrons albidiscalis Hampson in Poulton, 1916
- Cornifrons phasma Dyar, 1917
- Cornifrons ulceratalis Lederer, 1858
