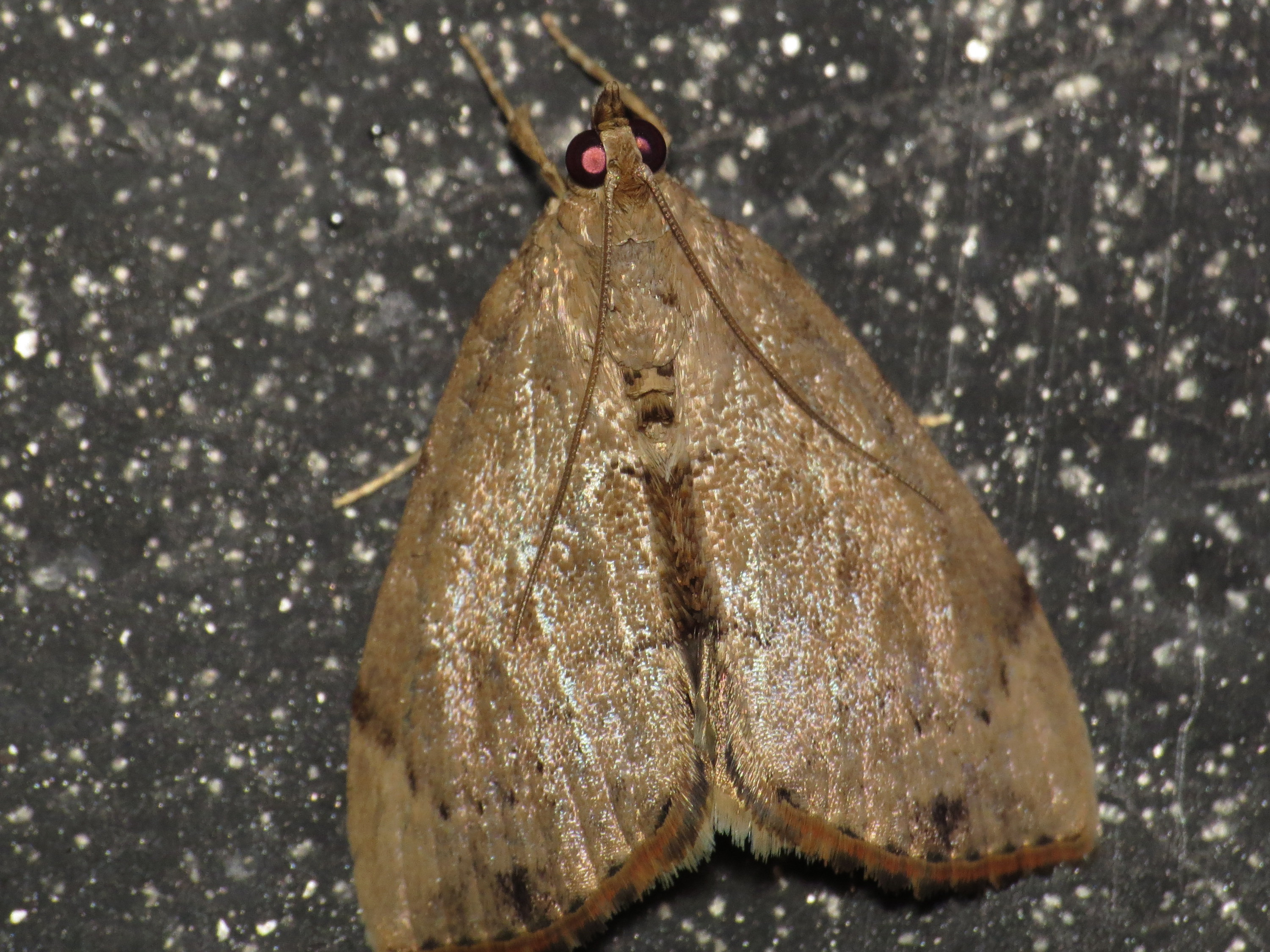

Scientific classification
- Kingdom: Animalia
- Phylum: Arthropoda
- Class: Insecta
- Order: Lepidoptera
- Family: Crambidae
- Genus: Crocidolomia
- Species: C. suffusalis

Binomial name
- Crocidolomia suffusalis (Hampson, 1891)

Synonyms
- Godara suffusalis Hampson, 1891; Godara illustris Lucas, 1893; Crocidolomia sinensis Caradja, 1925

= Crocidolomia suffusalis =

Species of moth

Crocidolomia suffusalis, the croci, is a moth in the family Crambidae. It was described by George Hampson in 1891. It is found in south-east Asia, where it has been recorded from India, Sri Lanka, China, Thailand, Malaysia, Java, Bali, Borneo, the Philippines and Taiwan. It is also present in New Guinea and Australia, where it has been recorded from Queensland and New South Wales.

The wingspan is about 30 mm. The forewings are brown with a variable pattern of dark brown, white and grey.
