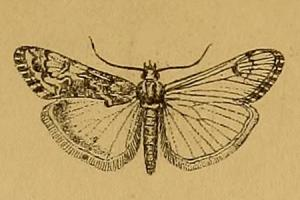

Scientific classification
- Domain: Eukaryota
- Kingdom: Animalia
- Phylum: Arthropoda
- Class: Insecta
- Order: Lepidoptera
- Family: Crambidae
- Genus: Cornifrons
- Species: C. ulceratalis

Binomial name
- Cornifrons ulceratalis Lederer, 1858

Synonyms
- Scoparia seriziatalis Oberthür, 1876

= Cornifrons ulceratalis =

Species of moth

Cornifrons ulceratalis is a species of moth in the family Crambidae. It is found in Portugal, Spain, Italy, Croatia, Bosnia and Herzegovina, Albania, Greece, Morocco, Algeria and the Canary Islands.

The wingspan is about 22 mm.

The larvae feed on Henophyton deserti and Sesamum indicum.
