= Orenaia lugubralis =

Scientific classification
- Domain: Eukaryota
- Kingdom: Animalia
- Phylum: Arthropoda
- Class: Insecta
- Order: Lepidoptera
- Family: Crambidae
- Genus: Orenaia
- Species: O. lugubralis

Binomial name
- Orenaia lugubralis (Lederer, 1857)

Synonyms
- Hercyna lugubralis Lederer, 1857; Orenaia lugubralis albescens Rebel, 1911; Hercyna helveticalis f. conspurcalis La Harpe, 1864

Species of moth

Orenaia lugubralis is a species of moth in the family Crambidae. It is found in France, Italy, Switzerland, Austria, Slovenia and Germany.
