= Trischistognatha yepezi =

Scientific classification
- Domain: Eukaryota
- Kingdom: Animalia
- Phylum: Arthropoda
- Class: Insecta
- Order: Lepidoptera
- Family: Crambidae
- Genus: Trischistognatha
- Species: T. yepezi

Binomial name
- Trischistognatha yepezi Munroe, 1973

Species of moth

Trischistognatha yepezi is a moth in the family Crambidae. It is found in Venezuela and Costa Rica.
