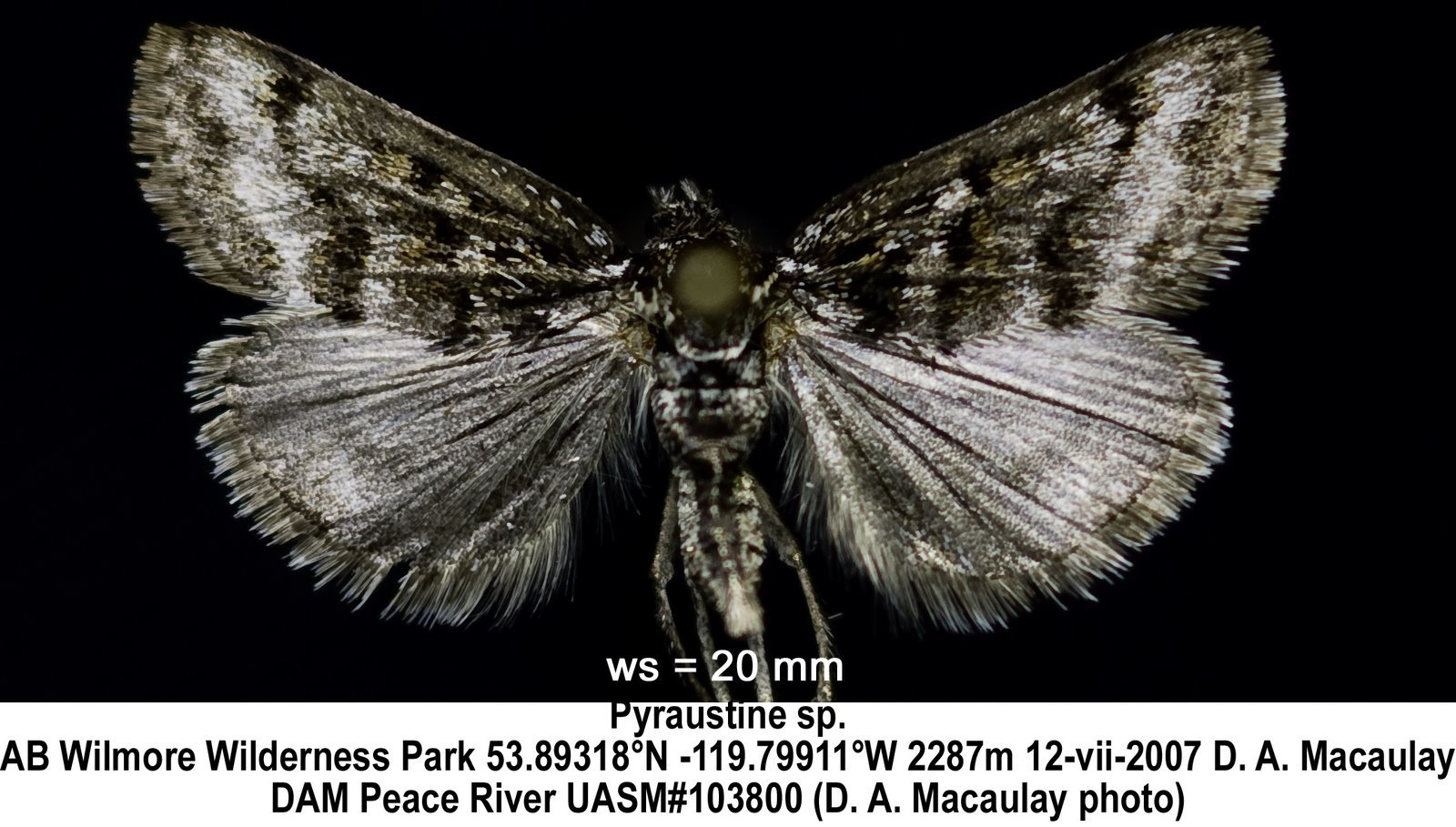

Scientific classification
- Domain: Eukaryota
- Kingdom: Animalia
- Phylum: Arthropoda
- Class: Insecta
- Order: Lepidoptera
- Family: Crambidae
- Genus: Orenaia
- Species: O. trivialis

Binomial name
- Orenaia trivialis Barnes & McDunnough, 1914

Synonyms
- Titanio subargentalis Barnes & McDunnough, 1918

= Orenaia trivialis =

Species of moth

Orenaia trivialis is a species of moth in the family Crambidae. It was first described by William Barnes and James Halliday McDunnough in 1914. It is found in North America, where it has been recorded from Colorado and the Yukon Territory.
