= Prorasea sideralis =

Scientific classification
- Kingdom: Animalia
- Phylum: Arthropoda
- Class: Insecta
- Order: Lepidoptera
- Family: Crambidae
- Genus: Prorasea
- Species: P. sideralis

Binomial name
- Prorasea sideralis (Dyar, 1917)

Synonyms
- Cornifrons simalis var. sideralis Dyar, 1917

Species of moth

Prorasea sideralis is a moth in the family Crambidae. It was described by Harrison Gray Dyar Jr. in 1917. It has been recorded in the US states of California, Montana and Nevada.

The wingspan is about 28 mm. Adults have been recorded on wing from March to July and from September to October.
