= Symphysa discalis =

Scientific classification
- Kingdom: Animalia
- Phylum: Arthropoda
- Class: Insecta
- Order: Lepidoptera
- Family: Crambidae
- Genus: Symphysa
- Species: S. discalis

Binomial name
- Symphysa discalis Hampson, 1912

Species of moth

Symphysa discalis is a moth in the family Crambidae. It was described by George Hampson in 1912. It is found in Jamaica.
