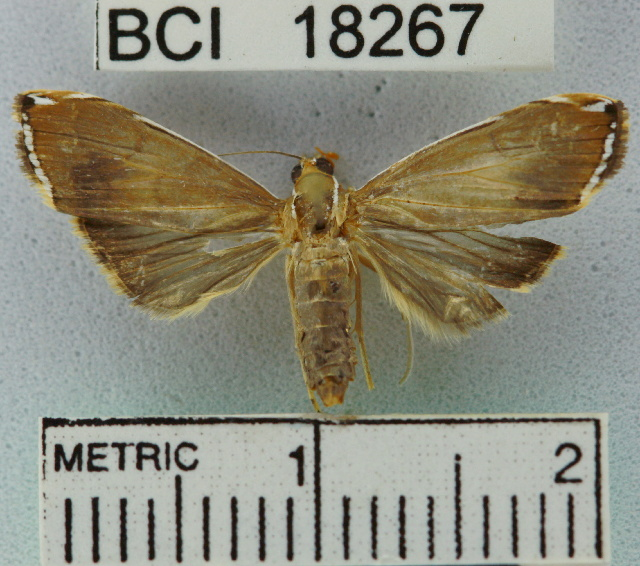

Scientific classification
- Kingdom: Animalia
- Phylum: Arthropoda
- Class: Insecta
- Order: Lepidoptera
- Family: Crambidae
- Subfamily: Evergestinae
- Genus: Trischistognatha; Warren, 1892

= Trischistognatha =

Genus of moths

Trischistognatha is a genus of moths of the family Crambidae.

== Species ==
- Trischistognatha limatalis
- Trischistognatha ochritacta
- Trischistognatha palindialis (Guenée, 1854)
- Trischistognatha pyrenealis (Walker, 1859)
- Trischistognatha yepezi
