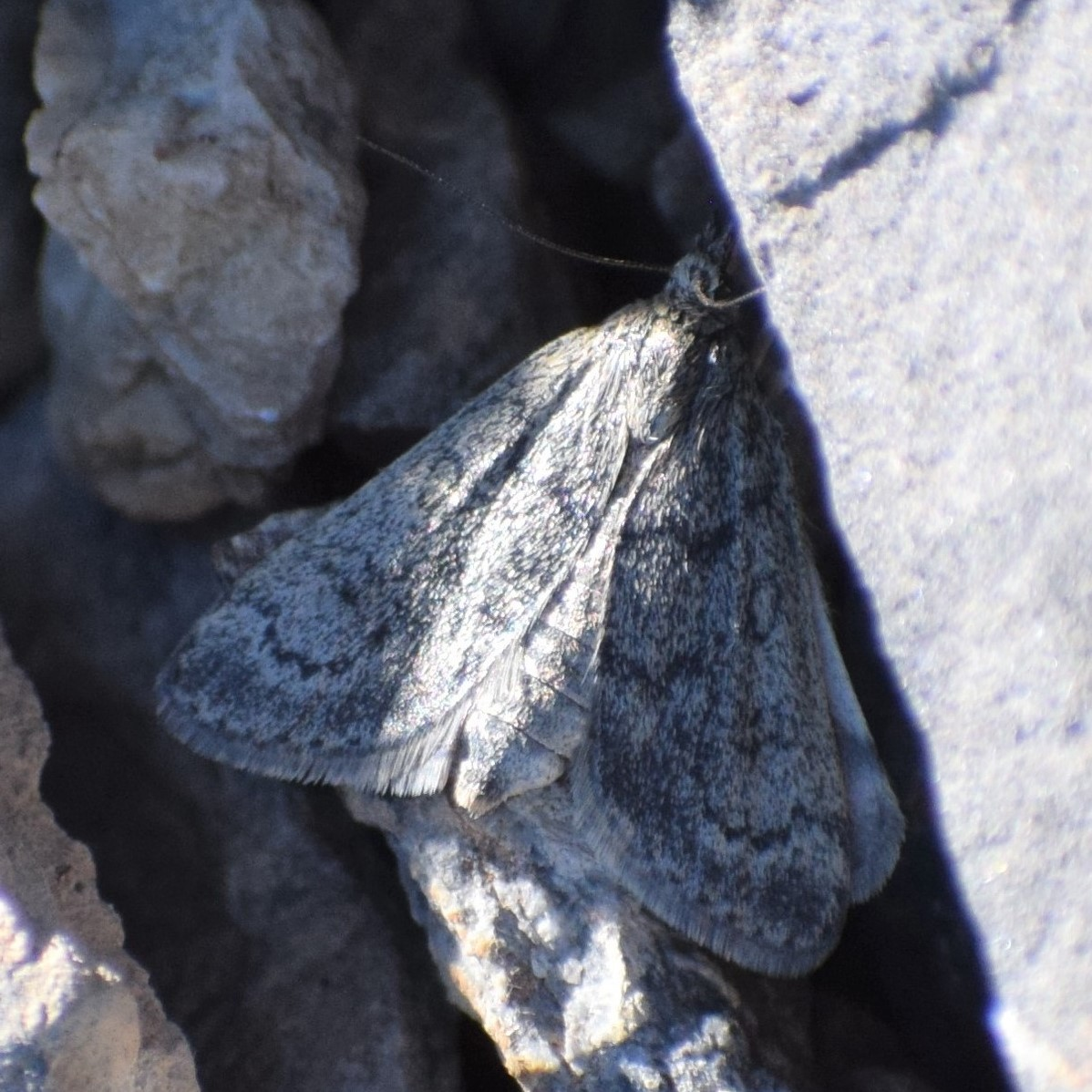

Scientific classification
- Kingdom: Animalia
- Phylum: Arthropoda
- Class: Insecta
- Order: Lepidoptera
- Family: Crambidae
- Genus: Orenaia
- Species: O. arcticalis

Binomial name
- Orenaia arcticalis Munroe, 1974

= Orenaia arcticalis =

Species of moth

Orenaia arcticalis is a species of moth in the family Crambidae. It was first described by Eugene G. Munroe in 1974. It is found in Canada, where it has been recorded from the Northwest Territories and Yukon Territory.
