= Orenaia sierralis =

Scientific classification
- Domain: Eukaryota
- Kingdom: Animalia
- Phylum: Arthropoda
- Class: Insecta
- Order: Lepidoptera
- Family: Crambidae
- Genus: Orenaia
- Species: O. sierralis

Binomial name
- Orenaia sierralis Munroe, 1974

Species of moth

Orenaia sierralis is a moth in the family Crambidae. It was described by Eugene G. Munroe in 1974. It is found in North America, where it has been recorded from California.
