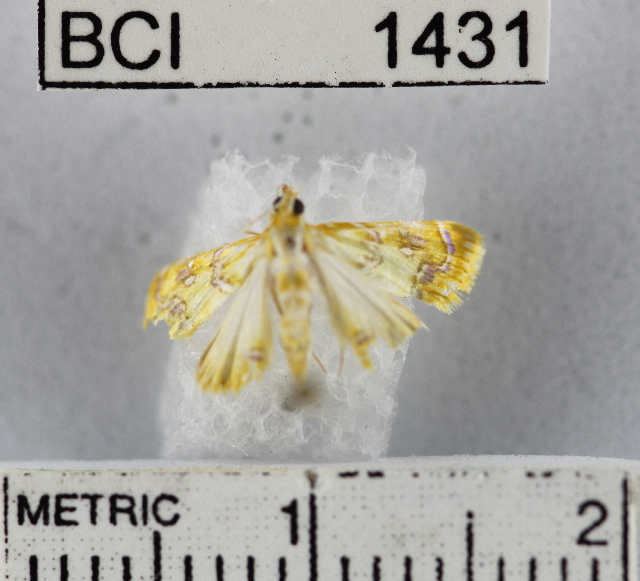
- Symphysa amoenalis

Scientific classification
- Kingdom: Animalia
- Phylum: Arthropoda
- Clade: Pancrustacea
- Class: Insecta
- Order: Lepidoptera
- Family: Crambidae
- Subfamily: Evergestinae
- Genus: Symphysa; Hampson, (1898) 1899

= Symphysa =

Genus of moths

Symphysa is a genus of moths of the family Crambidae.

== Species ==
- Symphysa amoenalis
- Symphysa discalis Hampson, 1912
- Symphysa lepidaria (Stoll in Cramer & Stoll, 1781)
