= Orenaia pallidivittalis =

Scientific classification
- Domain: Eukaryota
- Kingdom: Animalia
- Phylum: Arthropoda
- Class: Insecta
- Order: Lepidoptera
- Family: Crambidae
- Genus: Orenaia
- Species: O. pallidivittalis

Binomial name
- Orenaia pallidivittalis Munroe, 1956

Species of moth

Orenaia pallidivittalis is a moth in the family Crambidae. It was described by Eugene G. Munroe in 1956. It is found in North America, where it has been recorded from British Columbia.
