= Orenaia coloradalis =

Scientific classification
- Domain: Eukaryota
- Kingdom: Animalia
- Phylum: Arthropoda
- Class: Insecta
- Order: Lepidoptera
- Family: Crambidae
- Genus: Orenaia
- Species: O. coloradalis

Binomial name
- Orenaia coloradalis Barnes & McDunnough, 1914

Species of moth

Orenaia coloradalis is a moth in the family Crambidae. It was described by William Barnes and James Halliday McDunnough in 1914. It is found in North America, where it has been recorded from Arizona and Colorado.
