= Orenaia andereggialis =

Scientific classification
- Domain: Eukaryota
- Kingdom: Animalia
- Phylum: Arthropoda
- Class: Insecta
- Order: Lepidoptera
- Family: Crambidae
- Genus: Orenaia
- Species: O. andereggialis

Binomial name
- Orenaia andereggialis (Herrich-Schaffer, 1851)

Synonyms
- Hercyna andereggialis Herrich-Schaffer, 1851

Species of moth

Orenaia andereggialis is a species of moth in the family Crambidae. It is found in France, Italy, Switzerland and Austria.
