= Symphysa lepidaria =

Scientific classification
- Domain: Eukaryota
- Kingdom: Animalia
- Phylum: Arthropoda
- Class: Insecta
- Order: Lepidoptera
- Family: Crambidae
- Genus: Symphysa
- Species: S. lepidaria

Binomial name
- Symphysa lepidaria (Stoll in Cramer & Stoll, 1781)

Synonyms
- Phalaena (Pyralis) lepidaria Stoll in Cramer & Stoll, 1781; Symphysa lepidalis Hampson, 1899; Phalaena (Pyralis) sulphuralis Stoll in Cramer & Stoll, 1781; Homophysa sulphuratalis Guenée, 1854

Species of moth

Symphysa lepidaria is a moth in the family Crambidae. It was described by Stoll in 1781. It is found in Suriname, Costa Rica and Mexico.
