= Cylindrifrons =

Scientific classification
- Domain: Eukaryota
- Kingdom: Animalia
- Phylum: Arthropoda
- Class: Insecta
- Order: Lepidoptera
- Family: Crambidae
- Subfamily: Evergestinae
- Genus: Cylindrifrons; Munroe, 1951
- Species: C. succandidalis

Binomial name
- Cylindrifrons succandidalis (Hulst, 1886)

Synonyms
- Botis succandidalis Hulst, 1886; Botys succandidalis; Cavifrons simplex Warren, 1895

Genus of moths

Cylindrifrons is a genus of moths of the family Crambidae. It contains only one species, Cylindrifrons succandidalis, which is found in North America, where it has been recorded from Alberta, Arizona, California, Nevada, New Mexico and Utah.
