= Prorasea =

Scientific classification
- Domain: Eukaryota
- Kingdom: Animalia
- Phylum: Arthropoda
- Class: Insecta
- Order: Lepidoptera
- Family: Crambidae
- Subfamily: Evergestinae
- Genus: Prorasea; Grote, 1878

Genus of moths

Prorasea is a genus of moths of the family Crambidae.

== Species ==
- Prorasea fernaldi Munroe, 1974
- Prorasea gracealis Munroe, 1974
- Prorasea praeia (Dyar, 1917)
- Prorasea pulveralis (Warren, 1892)
- Prorasea sideralis (Dyar, 1917)
- Prorasea simalis Grote, 1878
