= Mirificarma interrupta =

Scientific classification
- Domain: Eukaryota
- Kingdom: Animalia
- Phylum: Arthropoda
- Class: Insecta
- Order: Lepidoptera
- Family: Gelechiidae
- Genus: Mirificarma
- Species: M. interrupta

Binomial name
- Mirificarma interrupta (Curtis, 1827)

Synonyms
- Anacampsia interrupta Curtis, 1827; Phalaena interuptella Hubner, 1793; Mirificarma interuptella

Species of moth

Mirificarma interrupta is a moth of the family Gelechiidae. It is found in Portugal, Spain, France, the Benelux, central Europe, Romania and North Africa.

The wingspan is 7-8.5 mm for males and females. Adults are on wing from March to July in one generation per year.

The larvae feed on Cytisus scoparius, Cytisus purgans, Genista species (records include Genista tinctoria, Genista pilosa, Genista germanica and Genista sagittalis).
