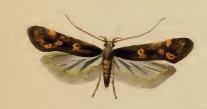

Scientific classification
- Kingdom: Animalia
- Phylum: Arthropoda
- Clade: Pancrustacea
- Class: Insecta
- Order: Lepidoptera
- Family: Gelechiidae
- Genus: Mirificarma
- Species: M. lentiginosella

Binomial name
- Mirificarma lentiginosella (Zeller, 1839)

Synonyms
- Gelechia lentiginosella Zeller, 1839

= Mirificarma lentiginosella =

Species of moth

Mirificarma lentiginosella is a moth of the family Gelechiidae. It is found from most of Europe (except Ireland, Sweden, Finland, most of the Baltic region and part of the Balkan Peninsula) to the Ural Mountains and Turkey.

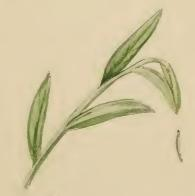
A sprig of Genista tinctoria eaten by larva

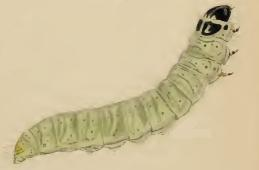
Larva

The wingspan is 6.5-8.5 mm for males and 6–8 mm for females. Adults are on wing from June to August.

The larvae feed on Genista tinctoria, Genista anglica, Genista germanica, Genista sagittalis and Laburnum anagyroides.
