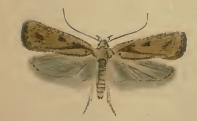

Scientific classification
- Kingdom: Animalia
- Phylum: Arthropoda
- Clade: Pancrustacea
- Class: Insecta
- Order: Lepidoptera
- Family: Depressariidae
- Genus: Agonopterix
- Species: A. atomella

Binomial name
- Agonopterix atomella (Denis & Schiffermuller, 1775)

Synonyms
- Tinea atomella Denis & Schiffermuller, 1775; Tichonia pulverella Hubner, 1825; Haemylis respersella Treitschke, 1833

= Agonopterix atomella =

Species of moth

Agonopterix atomella is a moth of the family Depressariidae. It is found in most of Europe.

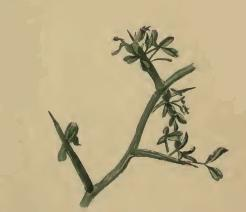
A sprig of Calycotome spinosa attacked by larva

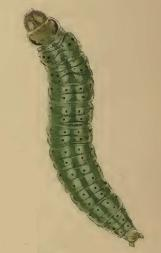
Larva

The wingspan is 16–22 mm. Adults are on wing from October to May.

The larvae feed on Genista tinctoria, Genista anglica, Genista pilosa and possibly Cytisus scoparius. They feed from within a spun or rolled leaf of their host plant.
