= Phyllonorycter fraxinella =

Scientific classification
- Kingdom: Animalia
- Phylum: Arthropoda
- Clade: Pancrustacea
- Class: Insecta
- Order: Lepidoptera
- Family: Gracillariidae
- Genus: Phyllonorycter
- Species: P. fraxinella

Binomial name
- Phyllonorycter fraxinella (Zeller, 1846)

Synonyms
- Lithocolletis fraxinella Zeller, 1846

Species of moth

Phyllonorycter fraxinella is a moth of the family Gracillariidae. It is found from Germany and Poland to Sicily and Greece and from France to southern Russia.

The larvae feed on Genista germanica and Genista tinctoria. They mine the leaves of their host plant.
