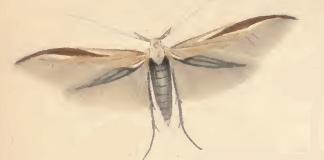

Scientific classification
- Kingdom: Animalia
- Phylum: Arthropoda
- Class: Insecta
- Order: Lepidoptera
- Family: Coleophoridae
- Genus: Coleophora
- Species: C. vibicella

Binomial name
- Coleophora vibicella (Hubner, 1813)

Synonyms
- Tinea vibicella Hubner, 1813

= Coleophora vibicella =

Species of moth

Coleophora vibicella is a moth of the family Coleophoridae found in Europe.

== Description ==
The wingspan is 16–24 mm. Adults are yellowish with white markings. They are on wing in August in western Europe.

The larvae feed on Chamaespartium sagittale, dyer's greenweed (Genista tinctoria) and vetches (Vicia species). Full-grown larvae can be found at the end of June.

== Distribution ==
Coleophora vibicella is found in Europe south of the line running from Great Britain to Ukraine. It has not been recorded from Ireland and the Balkan Peninsula.
