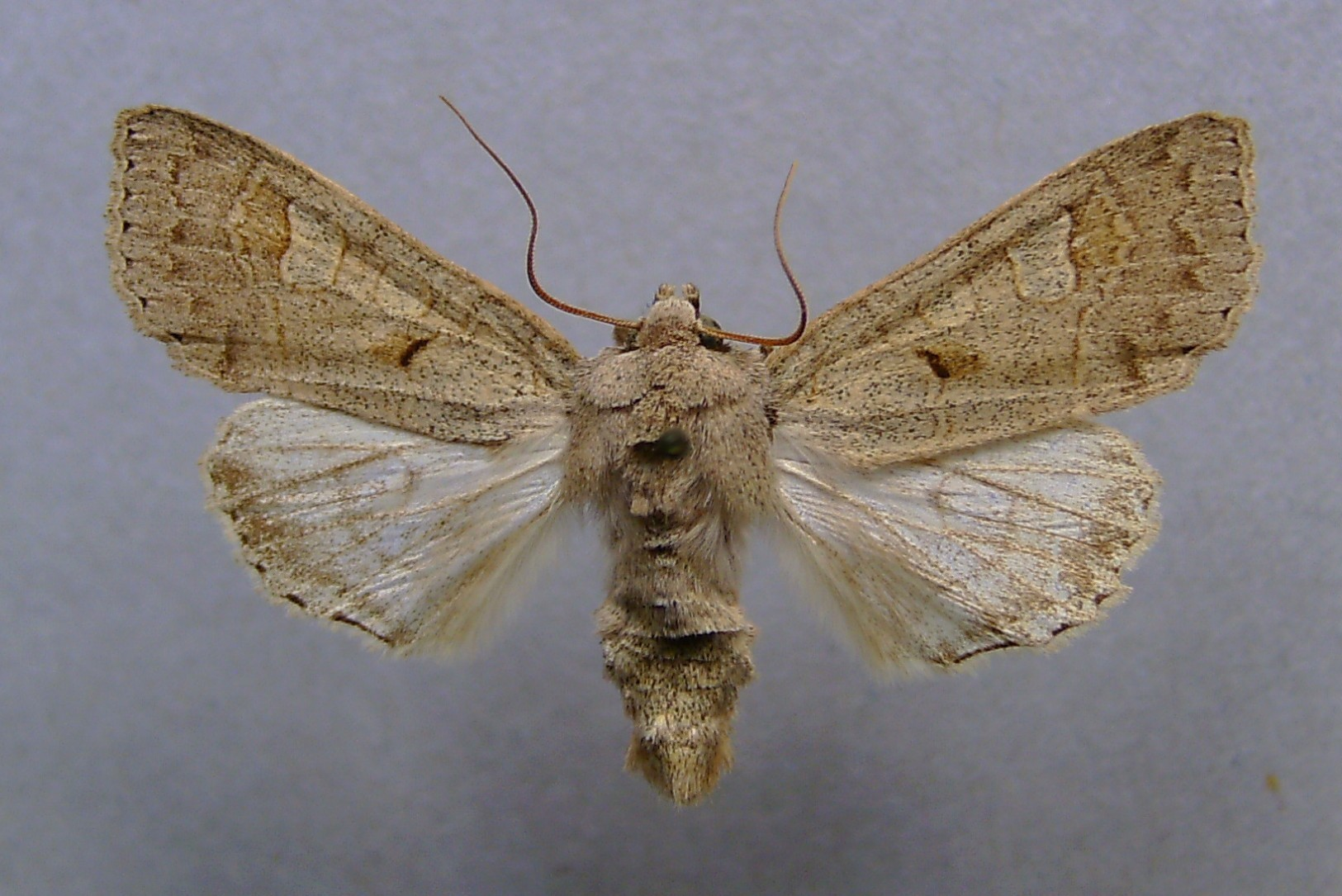
- Male
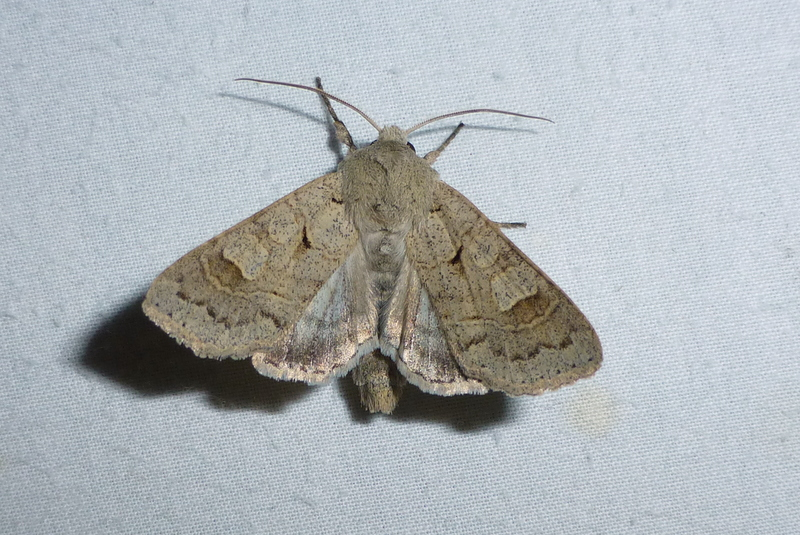

Scientific classification
- Domain: Eukaryota
- Kingdom: Animalia
- Phylum: Arthropoda
- Class: Insecta
- Order: Lepidoptera
- Superfamily: Noctuoidea
- Family: Noctuidae
- Genus: Ammoconia
- Species: A. caecimacula

Binomial name
- Ammoconia caecimacula (Denis & Schiffermüller, 1775)

Synonyms
- Noctua caecimacula Denis & Schiffermüller, 1775; Phalaena (Noctua) millegrana Esper, 1790; Phalaena (Noctua) respersa Brahm, 1791; Ammoconia caecimacula r. rhaeticaria Dannehl, 1926; Ammoconia caecimacula f. marsicaria Dannehl, 1929

= Ammoconia caecimacula =

Species of moth

Ammoconia caecimacula is a moth belonging to the family Noctuidae. It is found in most of Europe, excluding regions such as southern Spain, Great Britain, Ireland and northern Fennoscandia. Additionally, it can be found in Anatolia, western Turkestan and across the Palaearctic to Siberia. In the east the species is represented by subspecies transcaucasica and sibirica.

With a wingspan ranging from 35–48 mm, the adult moths are active from August to October or November.

The larvae of Ammoconia caecimacula have a diverse diet, consuming various plants including Cephalanthera damasonium, Rumex, Galium, Scrophularia, Genista, Taraxacum and Silene. Their preference lies with flowers and fruits.

== Subspecies ==
- Ammoconia caecimacula caecimacula
- Ammoconia caecimacula transcaucasica Ronkay & Varga, 1984
- Ammoconia caecimacula sibirica Staudinger, 1882
