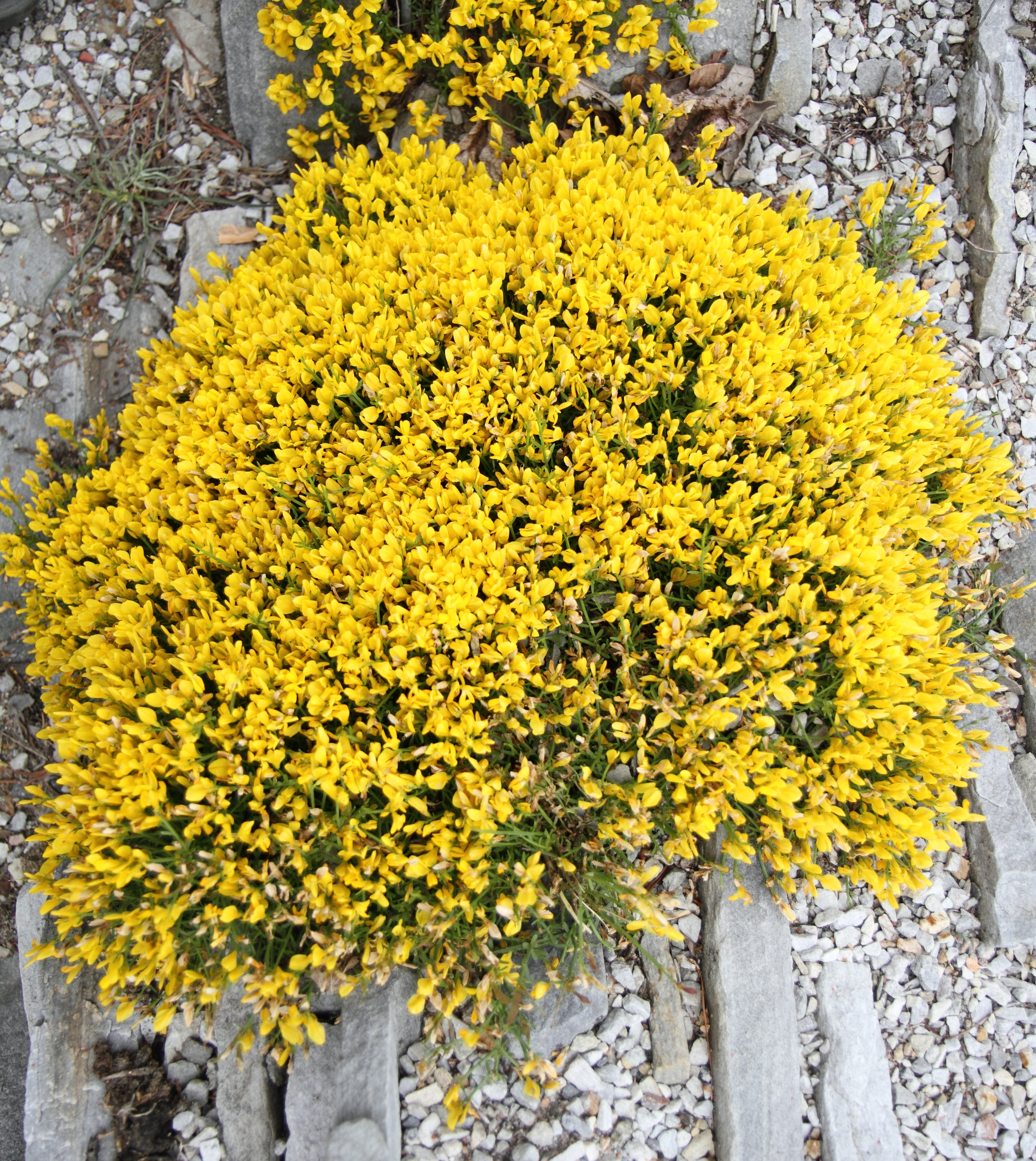

Scientific classification
- Kingdom: Plantae
- Clade: Tracheophytes
- Clade: Angiosperms
- Clade: Eudicots
- Clade: Rosids
- Order: Fabales
- Family: Fabaceae
- Subfamily: Faboideae
- Genus: Genista
- Species: G. lydia

Binomial name
- Genista lydia Boiss.

Synonyms
- List: Corniola pontica (Spach) K.Koch; Genista antiochia Boiss.; Genista caespitosa K.Koch; Genista januensis subsp. lydia (Boiss.) Kit Tan & Ziel.; Genista lamprophylla Spach; Genista leptophylla Spach; Genista lydia subsp. antalayaensis Ponert; Genista lydia subsp. antiochia (Boiss.) Ponert; Genista lydia subsp. rumelica (Velen.) Ponert; Genista pontica Spach; Genista rumelica Velen.; Genista transsilvanica Schur; Genista triangularis Baumg.

= Genista lydia =

Species of flowering plant

Genista lydia, Lydian broom, dwarf broom, or common woadwaxen (a name it shares with Genista tinctoria), is a species in the genus Genista, native to the Balkans, Turkey and Syria. It has gained the Royal Horticultural Society's Award of Garden Merit.
