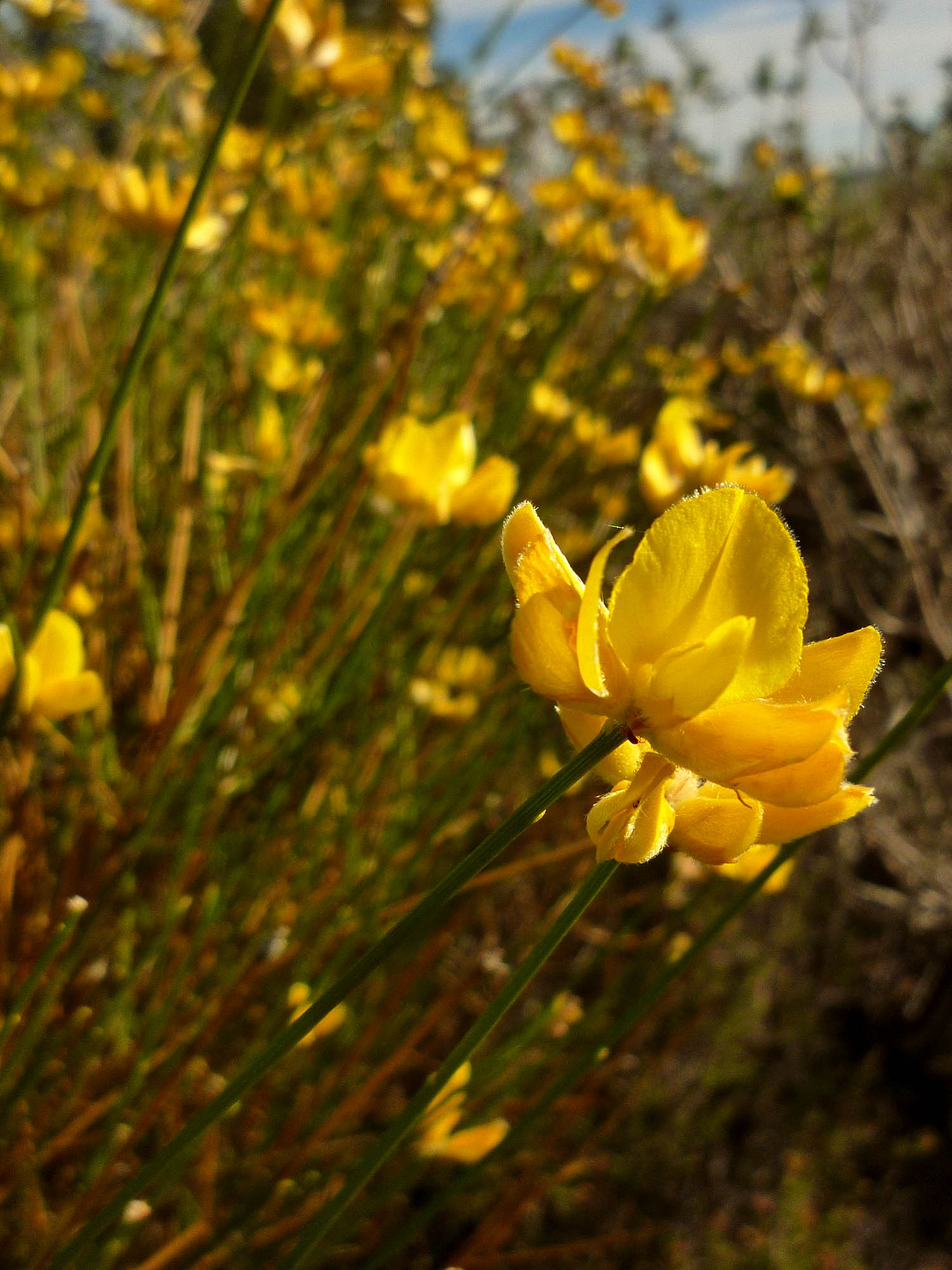
- Genista umbellata in Sierra de la Muela, Cabo Tiñoso y Roldán

Scientific classification
- Kingdom: Plantae
- Clade: Tracheophytes
- Clade: Angiosperms
- Clade: Eudicots
- Clade: Rosids
- Order: Fabales
- Family: Fabaceae
- Subfamily: Faboideae
- Genus: Genista
- Species: G. umbellata

Binomial name
- Genista umbellata (L'Her.) Poir.

= Genista umbellata =

Species of a plant

Genista umbellata is a species of shrub belonging to the Fabaceae family.

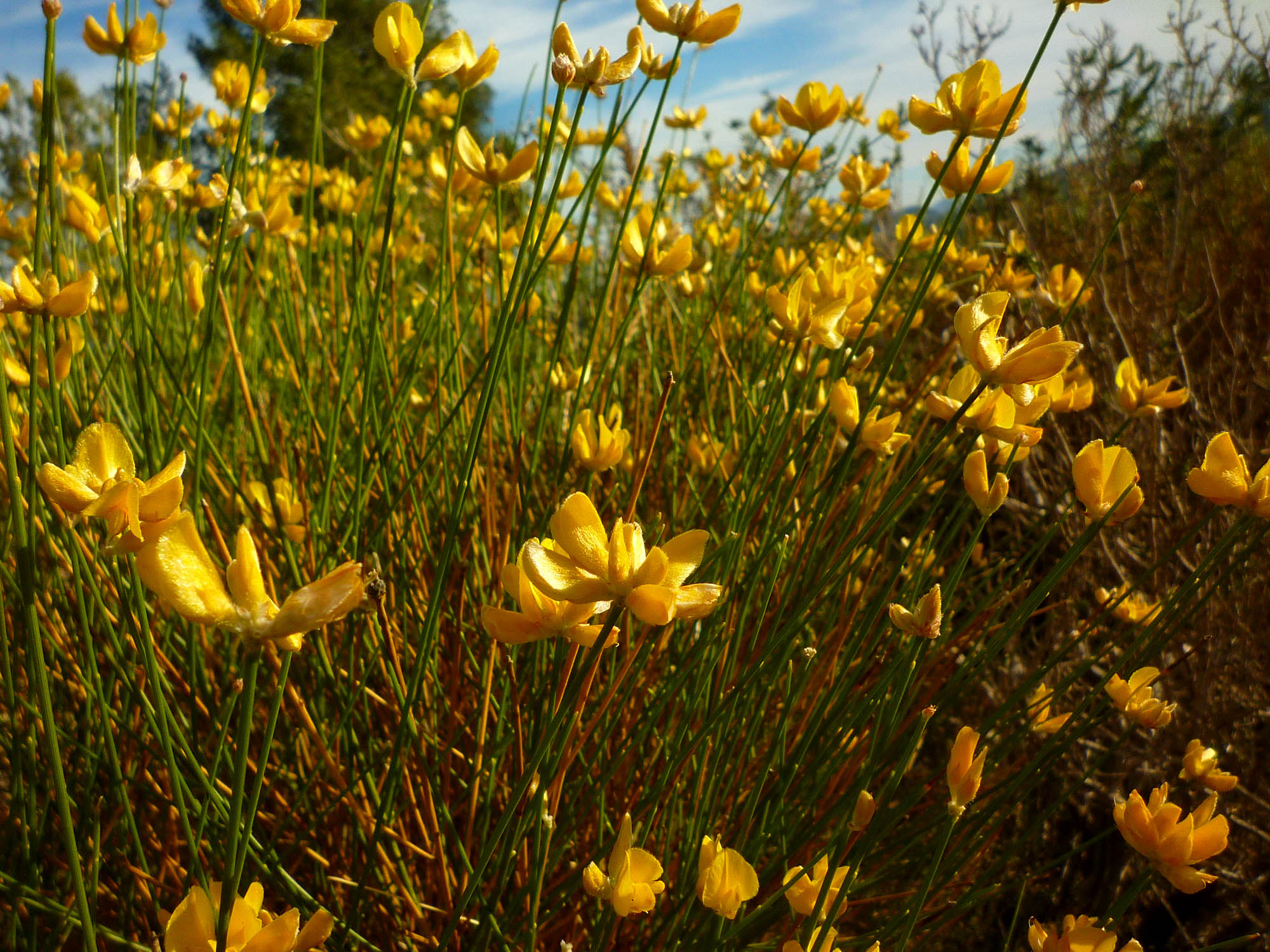
View of the plant

== Description ==
This is a leguminous plant that reaches a size of up to 1.5 m (4 ft 11 in) in height. Very branched from the base, with alternate, opposite or fasciculate, erect-patent branches. Stems with 10-14 T-shaped ribs. The lower leaves of young plants are trifoliolate, the others unifoliolate, stipitate, alternate and opposite; stipular organ traversed by 3 confluent ribs at the apex. Inflorescences are terminal, with 5-30 flowers 9–14 mm (0.35–0.55 in), yellow, pedicellate or subsentate, with 1 bract and 2 bractlets on the pedicel. Calyx 4.5-7(7.5) mm, campanulate, bilabiate, villous or sericeous, with the tube shorter than the lips. Corolla with the staminate nearly keel-sized, both sericeous or villous. Stamens 10, monadelphous. Ovary sericeous or villous, with 3-6 seminal rudiments; style glabrous, arched at apex; stigma capitate, extrorse or subterminal. Fruit 8-24 × 3.7-4.5(6) mm, oblongoid, somewhat flattened and torulose, sericeous or villous, silvery, with 2-4 seeds.

Chromosome number: 2n = 46, 48.

== Distribution and habitat ==
Found on marly or schistose slopes, thickets on calcareous and stony hills. Ibero-Maghrebi. It is distributed in Spain, Algeria and Morocco.

== Taxonomy ==
Genista umbellata was described by (L'Her.) Poir. and published in Encyclopédie Méthodique. Botanique ... Supplément 2(2): 715. 1812.

=== Etymology ===
- Genista: generic name from the Latin from which the Plantagenet kings and queens of England took their name, Genesta plant or plante genest, alluding to a story that, when William the Conqueror set sail for England, he plucked a plant that held fast, tenaciously, to a rock and stuck it in his helmet as a symbol that he too would be tenacious in his perilous task. The plant was called the planta genista in Latin. This is a good story, but unfortunately William the Conqueror came long before the Plantagenets and it was actually Geoffrey of Anjou who was nicknamed the Plantagenet, because he wore a sprig of yellow broom flowers on his helmet as a badge (genêt is the French name for the broom bush), and it was his son, Henry II, who became the first Plantagenet king. Other historical explanations are that Geoffrey planted this shrub as a hunting cover or that he used it to whip himself. It was not until Richard of York, the father of the two kings Edward IV and Richard III, that members of this family adopted the name Plantagenet, and then it was retroactively applied to the descendants of Geoffrey I of Anjou as the dynastic name.
- The epithet umbellata refers to flowers in umbels, which is when the inflorescence appears at the end of the rachis or widened main axis forming a receptacle.

=== Synonymy ===
- Genista equisetiformis Spach.

== Common name ==
It is known as bolina, bollina in Spain.
