= Phyllonorycter cerasinella =

Scientific classification
- Domain: Eukaryota
- Kingdom: Animalia
- Phylum: Arthropoda
- Class: Insecta
- Order: Lepidoptera
- Family: Gracillariidae
- Genus: Phyllonorycter
- Species: P. cerasinella

Binomial name
- Phyllonorycter cerasinella (Reutti, 1852)

Synonyms
- Lithocolletis cerasinella Reutti, 1852

Species of moth

Phyllonorycter cerasinella is a moth of the family Gracillariidae. It is found from all of Germany to the Iberian Peninsula, the Alps and Albania and from France to Ukraine and Bulgaria.

The larvae feed on Chamaespartium sagittale. They mine the leaves of their host plant.
