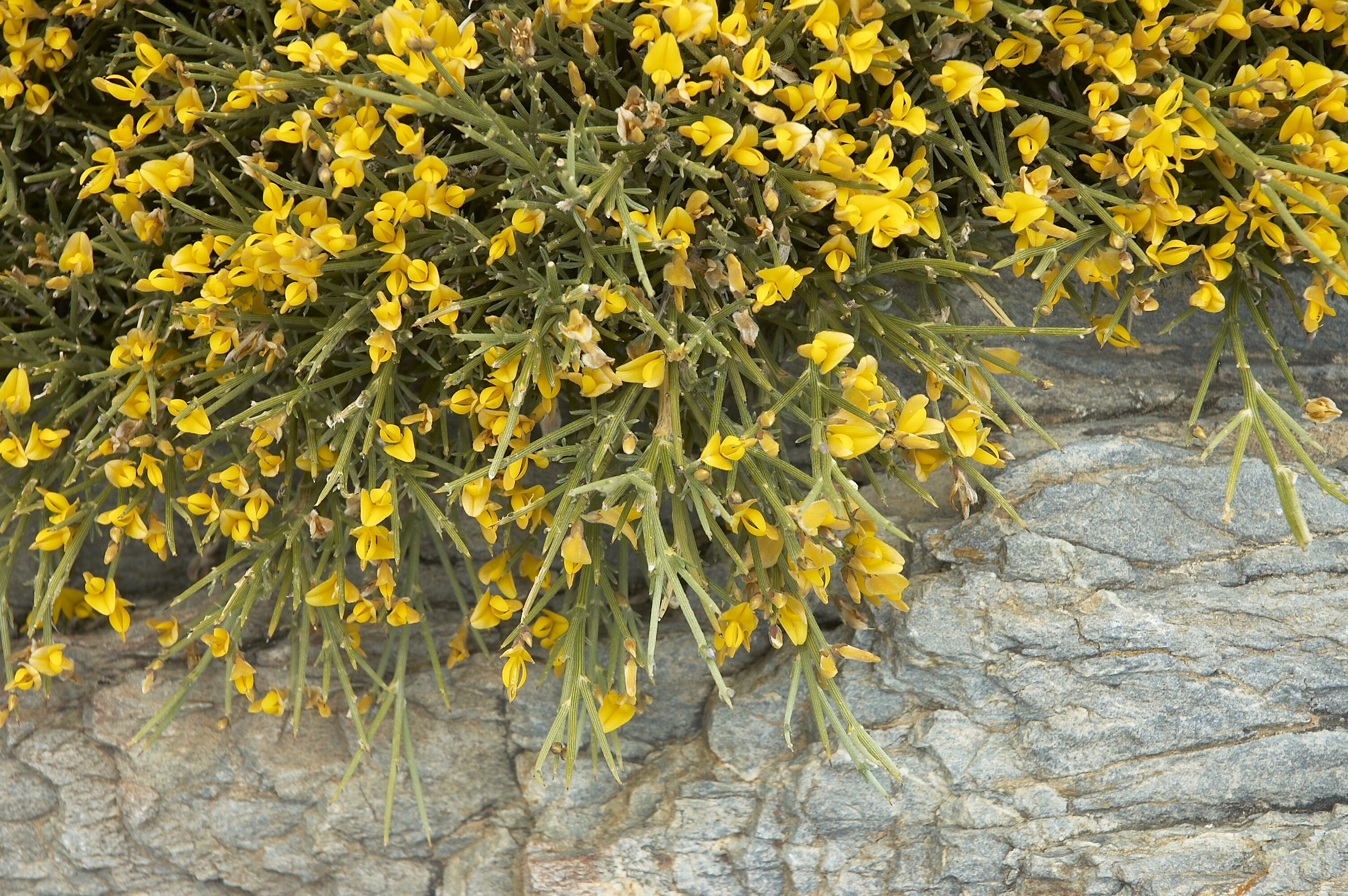

Scientific classification
- Kingdom: Plantae
- Clade: Tracheophytes
- Clade: Angiosperms
- Clade: Eudicots
- Clade: Rosids
- Order: Fabales
- Family: Fabaceae
- Subfamily: Faboideae
- Genus: Genista
- Species: G. acanthoclada

Binomial name
- Genista acanthoclada DC.

Synonyms
- Cytisanthus acanthocladus (DC.) Gams

= Genista acanthoclada =

Species of plant

Genista acanthoclada is a species of flowering plant in the genus Genista. The species is native to Eastern Mediterranean, in countries such as Türkiye, Greece (mainland, east Aegean Islands and Crete), Syria and Lebanon.

As of August 2025, Plants of the World Online accepted two subspecies:

- Genista acanthoclada subsp. acanthoclada
- Genista acanthoclada subsp. echinus (Spach) Vierh.
