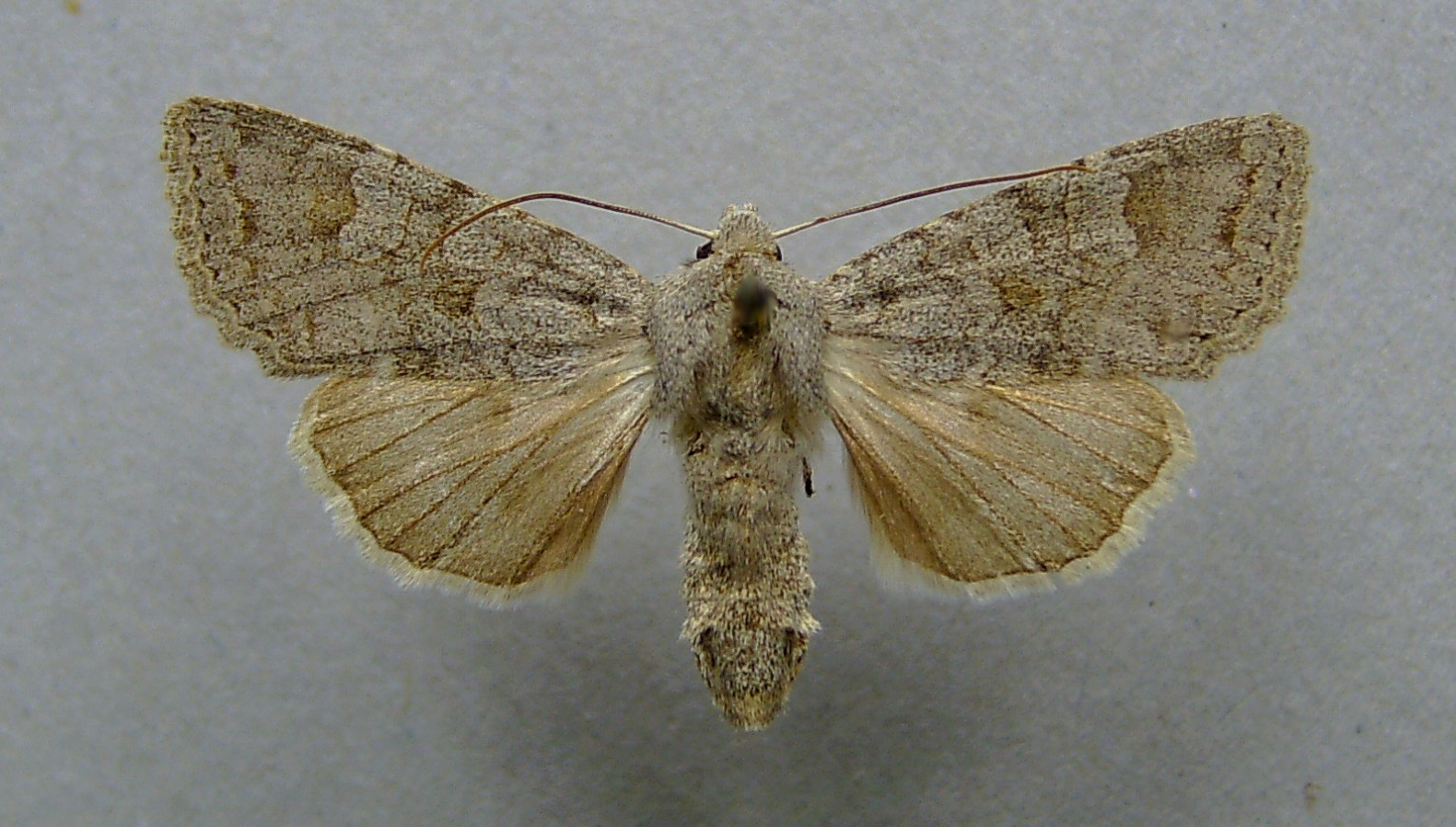
- Female

Scientific classification
- Domain: Eukaryota
- Kingdom: Animalia
- Phylum: Arthropoda
- Class: Insecta
- Order: Lepidoptera
- Superfamily: Noctuoidea
- Family: Noctuidae
- Genus: Ammoconia
- Species: A. senex

Binomial name
- Ammoconia senex (Geyer, 1828)

Synonyms
- Noctua senex Geyer, 1828; Mythimna senex

= Ammoconia senex =

Species of moth

Ammoconia senex is a moth of the family Noctuidae. It is found in the European part of the Mediterranean Region and an isolated population near the Middle Rhine. It is also found in Turkey, the Caucasus, Iraq and Iran.

The wingspan is 36–46 mm. Adults are on wing from September to October or November.

The larvae feed on various low-growing plants, including Plantago and Taraxacum.

== Subspecies ==
- Ammoconia senex senex (northern Mediterranean Region)
- Ammoconia senex mediorhenana Fuchs, 1879 (Middle Rhine)
- Ammoconia senex typhoea Turati, 1909 (Sicily)
- Ammoconia senex wagneri (Boursin, 1935) (Bulgaria)
- Ammoconia senex victoris Ronkay & Varga, 1994 (Turkey)
- Ammoconia senex rjabovi Ronkay & Varga, 1984 (Dagestan)
- Ammoconia senex transhamadanensis Gyulai & Ronkay, 2006 (Iran)
