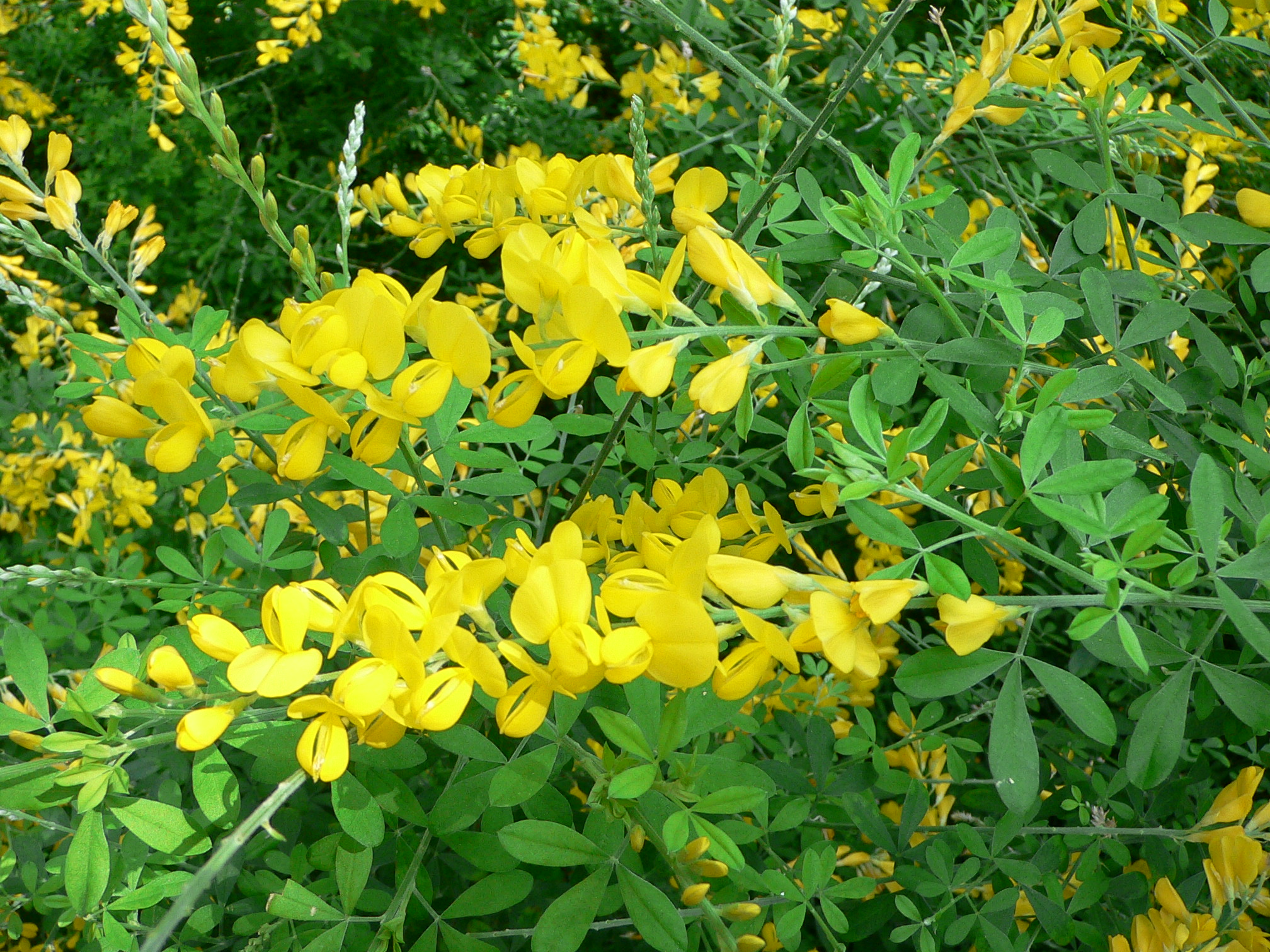

Scientific classification
- Kingdom: Plantae
- Clade: Tracheophytes
- Clade: Angiosperms
- Clade: Eudicots
- Clade: Rosids
- Order: Fabales
- Family: Fabaceae
- Subfamily: Faboideae
- Genus: Genista
- Species: G. stenopetala

Binomial name
- Genista stenopetala Webb & Berthel.

Synonyms
- Cytisus atleyanus (K.Koch) K.Koch; Cytisus bracteolatus (Link) Voss; Cytisus chrysobotrys Fisch.; Cytisus genistoides Regel; Cytisus spachianus (Webb) Kuntze; Genista bracteolata Link; Teline atleyana K.Koch; Teline bracteolata (Link) K.Koch

= Genista stenopetala =

Species of flowering plant

Genista stenopetala, the sweet broom, Easter broom or leafy broom (syn. Genista spachiana, Cytisus spachianus), is a species of flowering plant in the legume family Fabaceae, native to the Canary Islands, on La Palma and Tenerife.

== Etymology ==
The Latin specific epithet stenopetala means "with narrow petals".

== Description ==
It is an evergreen shrub growing to 3 metres (9.8 ft) tall. The leaves are trifoliate, the leaflets 1–3 centimetres (0.39–1.18 in) long, narrow elliptic, coated with fine silky, silvery hairs. The strongly scented flowers are yellow, 1–2 centimetres (0.39–0.79 in) long, produced in racemes 5–11 centimetres (2.0–4.3 in) long. The flowers appear in late winter or early spring. The fruit is a pod 2–3 centimetres (0.79–1.18 in) long.

Under the name Genista × spachiana, it has won the Royal Horticultural Society's Award of Garden Merit. It is not a hardy plant, and does not tolerate temperatures below 5 °C (41 °F), so in temperate climates it is usually grown under glass. However, it may be placed outside during the summer months, in a sheltered, sunny spot.
