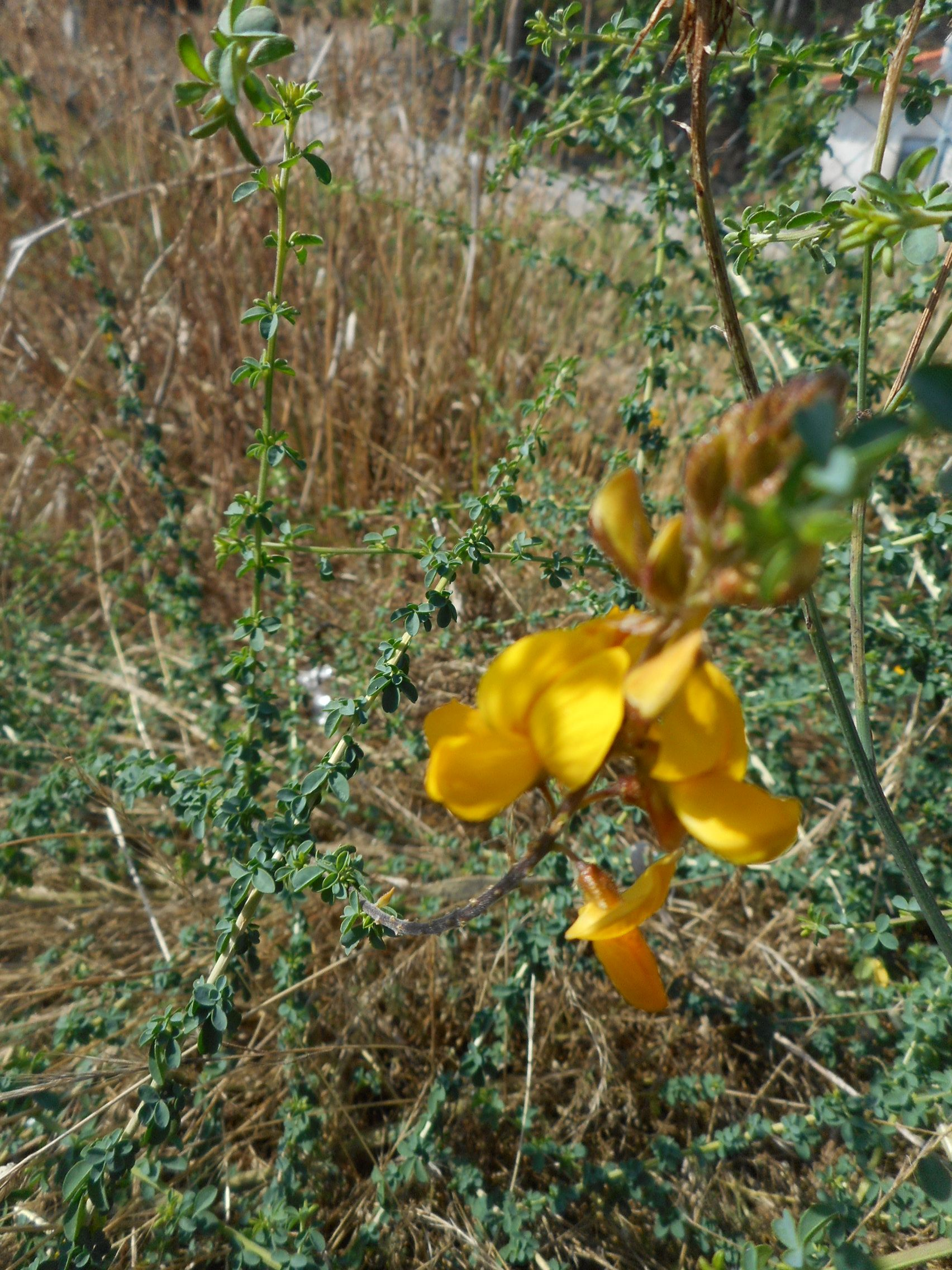

Conservation status
- Near Threatened (IUCN 3.1)

Scientific classification
- Kingdom: Plantae
- Clade: Tracheophytes
- Clade: Angiosperms
- Clade: Eudicots
- Clade: Rosids
- Order: Fabales
- Family: Fabaceae
- Subfamily: Faboideae
- Genus: Genista
- Species: G. berberidea

Binomial name
- Genista berberidea Lange

= Genista berberidea =

Species of flowering plant

Genista berberidea is a species of broom native to the northwest Iberian Peninsula in southwest Europe.

== Description ==
Genista berberidea is a perennial spiny bush (its name in Portuguese is arranha-lobos: "wolf scratcher") 0.5–1.5 m (1 ft 8 in – 4 ft 11 in) tall. Inflorescence has 3-5 flowers. Seeds are 1.5–1.7 mm (0.059–0.067 in) diameter, ovoid, dark and bright. 2n = 36.

== Distribution and habitat ==
Genista berberidea is endemic to the northwest of the Iberian Peninsula in Galicia (Spain) and northwest Portugal. It inhabits scrubs in humid places, peatlands and margins of water lines. Often in rainy places and hygro-peat substrates.
