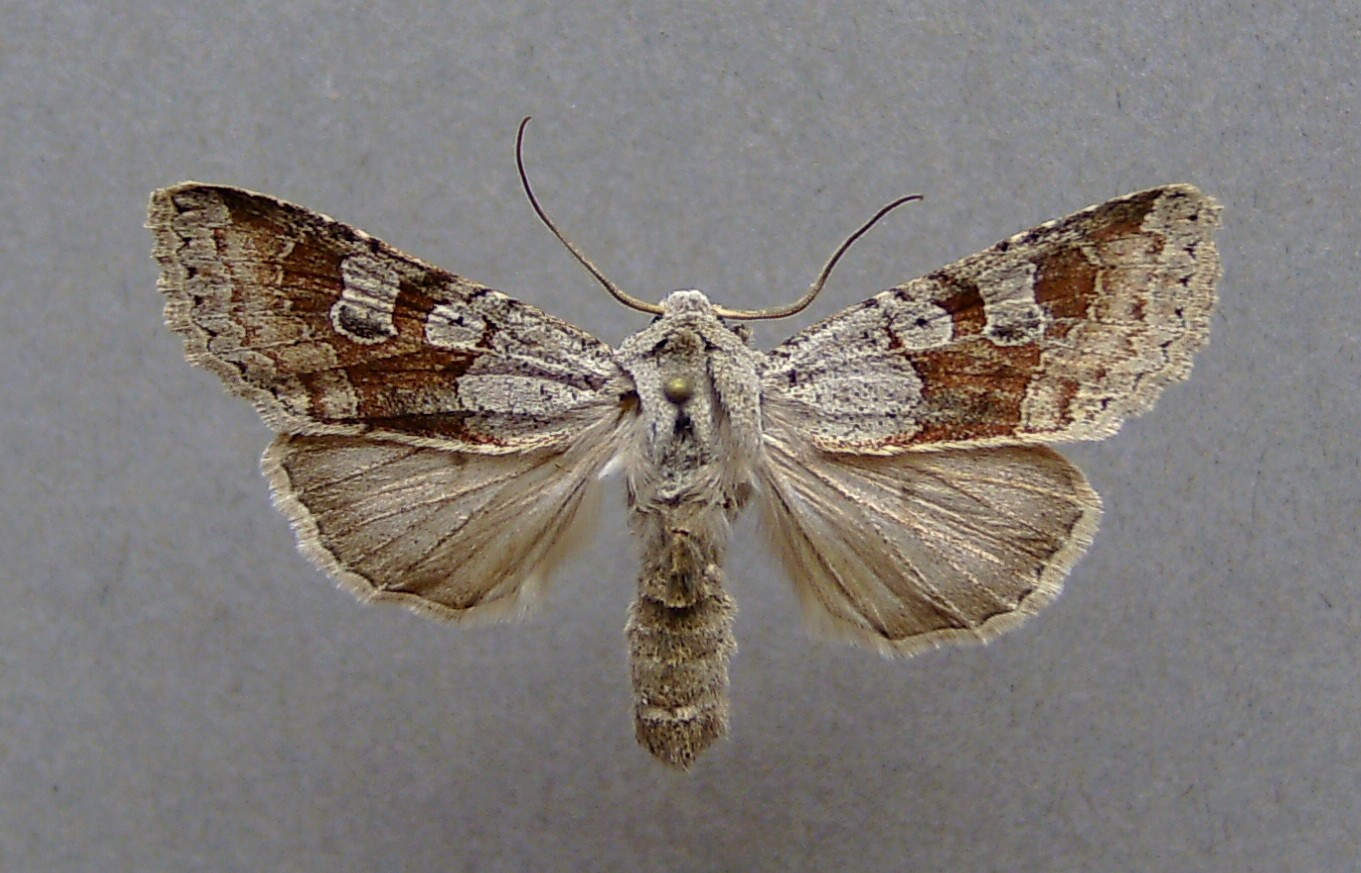

Scientific classification
- Domain: Eukaryota
- Kingdom: Animalia
- Phylum: Arthropoda
- Class: Insecta
- Order: Lepidoptera
- Superfamily: Noctuoidea
- Family: Noctuidae
- Genus: Ammoconia
- Species: A. aholai

Binomial name
- Ammoconia aholai Fibiger, 1996

= Ammoconia aholai =

Species of moth

Ammoconia aholai is a moth of the family Noctuidae. It is endemic to Cyprus.

The wingspan is 36–44 mm. There is one generation per year with adults on wing in fall.

The larval host plant is unknown. The species probably overwinters as an egg.
