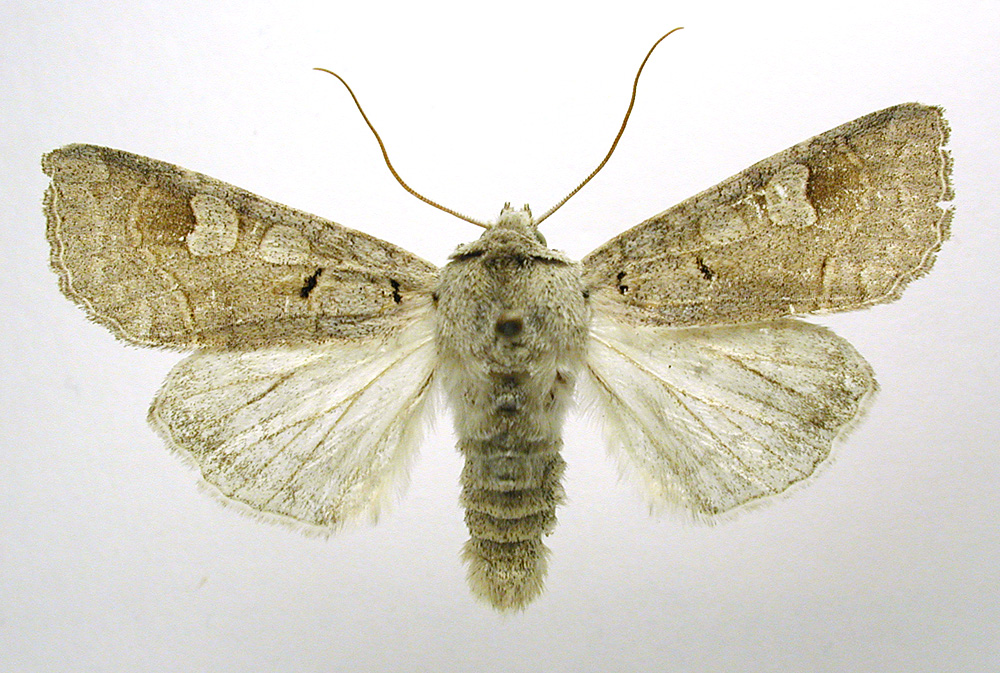
- Ammoconia caecimacula

Scientific classification
- Domain: Eukaryota
- Kingdom: Animalia
- Phylum: Arthropoda
- Class: Insecta
- Order: Lepidoptera
- Superfamily: Noctuoidea
- Family: Noctuidae
- Subfamily: Xyleninae
- Genus: Ammoconia; Lederer, 1857

= Ammoconia =

Genus of moths

Ammoconia is a genus of moths of the family Noctuidae.

== Species ==
- Ammoconia aholai Fibiger, 1996
- Ammoconia anonyma Ronkay & Varga, 1984
- Ammoconia caecimacula Denis & Schiffermüller, 1775
- Ammoconia reisseri Ronkay & Varga, 1984
- Ammoconia senex Geyer, 1828
  - Ammoconia senex senex
  - Ammoconia senex transhamadanensis Gyulai & Ronkay, 2006
