= Broom bush =

Broom bush may refer to:

- Broom (shrub), shrubs in the subfamily Faboideae
- Melaleuca uncinata, known as Broombush or broom bush
