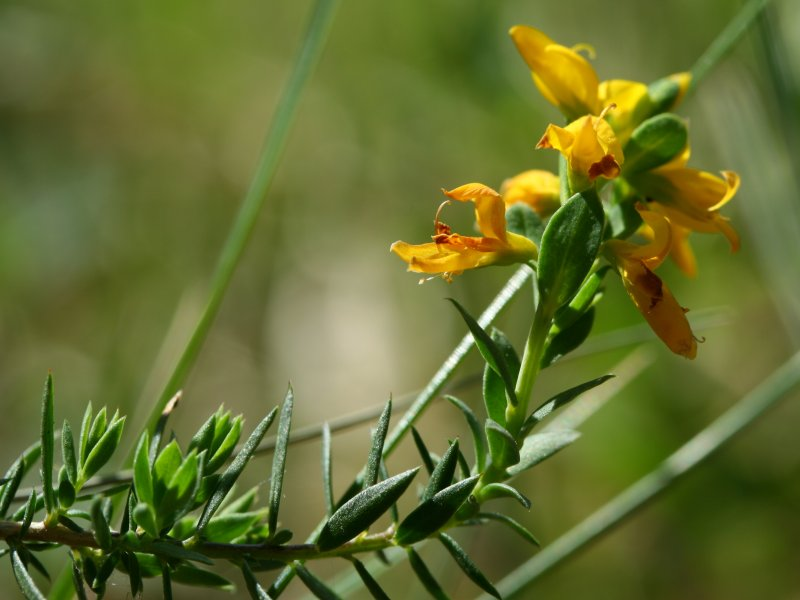

Scientific classification
- Kingdom: Plantae
- Clade: Embryophytes
- Clade: Tracheophytes
- Clade: Angiosperms
- Clade: Eudicots
- Clade: Rosids
- Order: Fabales
- Family: Fabaceae
- Subfamily: Faboideae
- Genus: Genista
- Species: G. anglica

Binomial name
- Genista anglica L.

= Genista anglica =

Species of flowering plant

Genista anglica, the petty whin, needle furze or needle whin, is a shrubby flowering plant of the family Fabaceae which can be found in Europe. In Great Britain, it is found in Cornwall, Wales and eastern Scotland. It is 1 metre (3 ft 3 in) high. The plant benefits from growing in low nutrients, high moisture soil . It has also been shown it is susceptible to atmospheric nitrogen poisoning.
