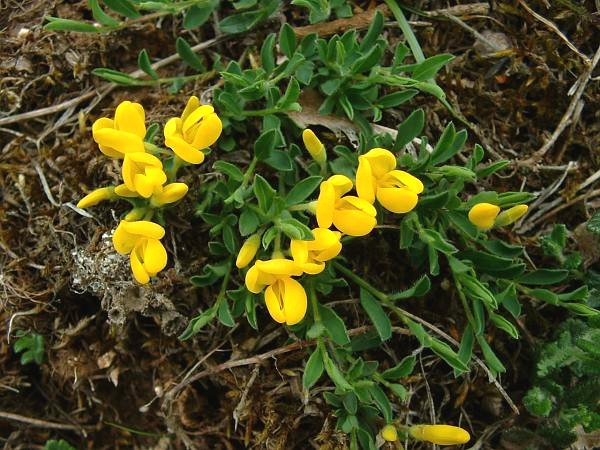

Scientific classification
- Kingdom: Plantae
- Clade: Tracheophytes
- Clade: Angiosperms
- Clade: Eudicots
- Clade: Rosids
- Order: Fabales
- Family: Fabaceae
- Subfamily: Faboideae
- Genus: Genista
- Species: G. pilosa

Binomial name
- Genista pilosa L.

= Genista pilosa =

Species of flowering plant

Genista pilosa, commonly known as hairy greenweed, silkyleaf broom, silkyleaf woadwaxen and creeping broom, is a plant species in the genus Genista. It is 30–45 centimetres (12–18 in) tall and has green coloured stems. It has yellowish coloured flowers which grow in 1–3 pairs. It grows in western and central Europe in poor, dry, sandy, and stony soils.
