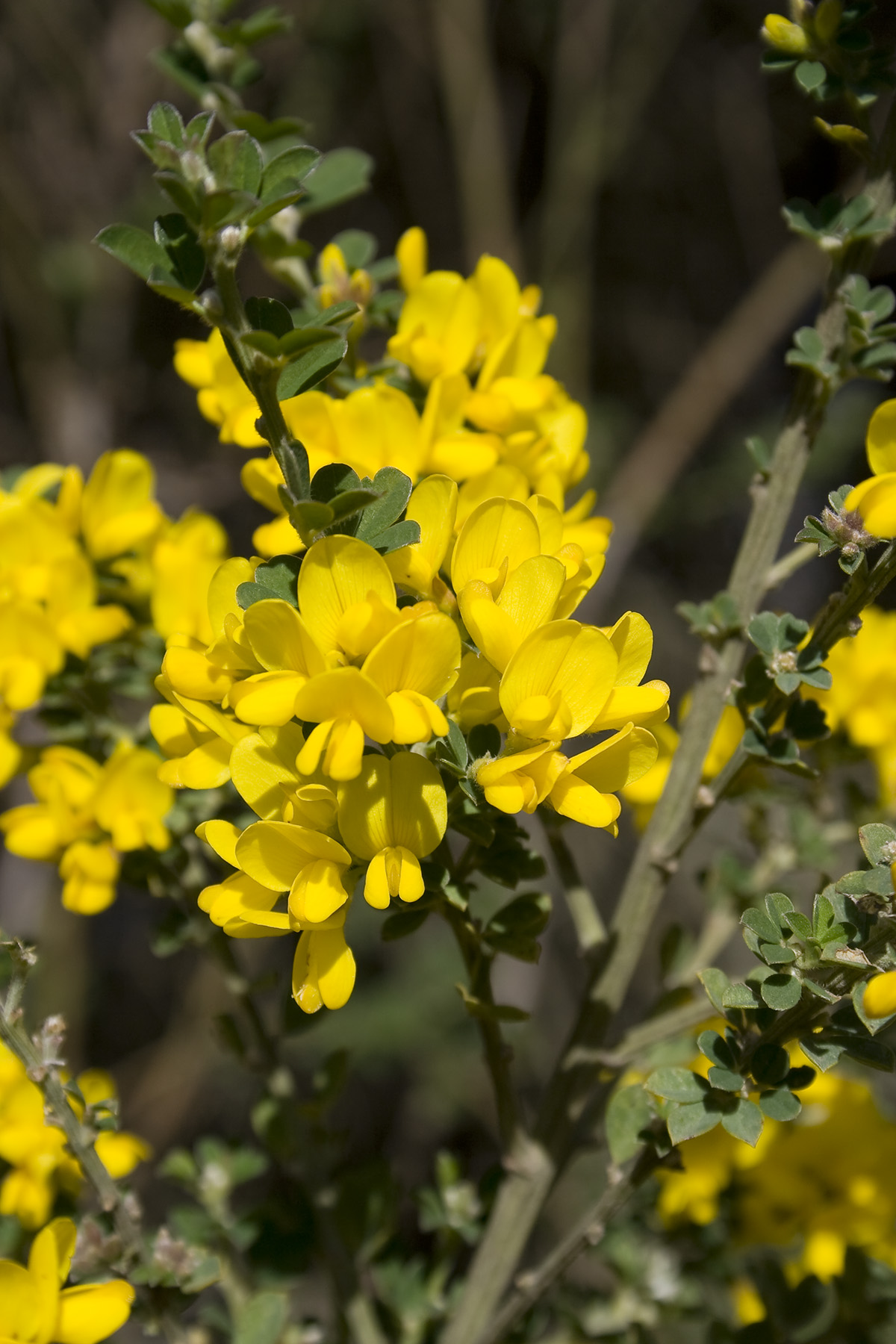
- French broom

Scientific classification
- Kingdom: Plantae
- Clade: Tracheophytes
- Clade: Angiosperms
- Clade: Eudicots
- Clade: Rosids
- Order: Fabales
- Family: Fabaceae
- Subfamily: Faboideae
- Tribe: Genisteae
- Genus: Genista; L. (1753)

Species
- 144; see text

Synonyms
- Argelasia Fourr. (1868); Asterocytisus Schur ex Fuss (1866); Avornela Raf. (1838); Chamaespartium Adans. (1763); Chamaesparton Fourr. (1868); Corniola Adans. (1763); Cytisanthus O.Lang (1843); Dendrospartum Spach (1845); Drymospartum C.Presl (1845); Enantiosparton K.Koch (1869); Euteline Raf. (1838); Genistella Ortega (1773); Genistoides Moench (1794); Lissera Adans. ex Fourr. (1868); Listera Adans. (1763); Lugaion Raf. (1838); Phyllobotrys Fourr. (1869); Pterospartum (Spach) K.Koch (1853); Saltzwedelia G.Gaertn., B.Mey. & Scherb. (1800); Scorpius Moench (1794), nom. illeg.; Syspone Griseb. (1843); Telinaria C.Presl (1845), nom. superfl.; Teline Medik. (1787); Voglera G.Gaertn., B.Mey. & Scherb. (1800)

= Genista =

Genus of flowering plants

Genista /dʒɛˈnɪstə/ is a genus of flowering plants in the legume family Fabaceae, native to open habitats such as moorland and pasture in Europe and western Asia. They include species commonly called broom, though the term may also refer to other genera, including Cytisus and Chamaecytisus. Brooms in other genera are sometimes considered synonymous with Genista: Echinospartum, Retama, Spartium, Stauracanthus, and Ulex.

== Description ==
They are mainly deciduous shrubs and trees, often with brush-like foliage, often spiny to deter browsing, and masses of small, pea-like yellow blooms which are sometimes fragrant. Many of the species have flowers that open explosively when alighted on by an insect, the style flying through the upper seam of the keel and striking the underside of the insect, followed by a shower of pollen that coats the insect.

The name of the Plantagenet royal line, which reigned in England from 1154 to 1485, is derived from this genus, being a dialectal variation of planta genista.

Several species are widely cultivated for their often sweet-smelling, abundant blooms early in the season, though many are not fully hardy. The cultivar 'Porlock' has received the Award of Garden Merit from the Royal Horticultural Society in the United Kingdom.

== Species ==
144 species are currently accepted. Genista includes the following species:

- Genista abchasica Sachokia
- Genista acanthoclada DC.
- Genista aetnensis (Biv.) DC.—Mount Etna broom
- Genista albida Willd.
- Genista anatolica Boiss.
- Genista anglica L.—petty whin, needle furze
- Genista angustifolia Schischkin
- Genista arbusensis Vals.
- Genista aristata C. Presl
- Genista armeniaca Spach
- Genista aspalathoides Lam.
- Genista aucheri Boiss.
- Genista ausetana (O. Bolòs & Vigo) Talavera
- Genista balearica Porta & Rigo
- Genista banatica (Simonk.) Holub
- Genista benehoavensis (Bolle ex Svent.) del Arco
- Genista berberidea Lange
- Genista burdurensis P.E. Gibbs
- Genista cadasonensis Vals.
- Genista canariensis L.
- Genista capitellata Coss.
- Genista carinalis Griseb.
- Genista carpetana Lange
- Genista cephalantha Spach
- Genista cinerascens Lange
- Genista cinerea (Vill.) DC.
- Genista clavata Poir.
- Genista compacta Schischkin
- Genista corsica (Loisel.) DC.
- Genista cupanii Guss.
- Genista depressa M. Bieb.
- Genista desoleana Vals.
- Genista dorycnifolia Font Quer
- Genista ephedroides DC.
- Genista falcata Brot.
- Genista fasselata Decne.
- Genista ferox Poir.
- Genista flagellaris Sommier & Levier
- Genista florida L.
- Genista fukarekiana Micevski & E. Mey.
- Genista gasparrinii (Guss.) C. Presl
- Genista germanica L.
- Genista haenseleri Boiss.
- Genista halacsyi Heldr.
- Genista hassertiana (Bald.) Buchegger
- Genista hillebrandtii H. Christ
- Genista hirsuta M. Vahl
- Genista hispanica L.
- Genista holopetala (Koch) Bald.
- Genista humifusa L.
- Genista hystrix Lange
- Genista ifniensis Caball.
- Genista involucrata Spach
- Genista januensis Viv.
  - subsp. januensis Viv.
  - subsp. lydia (Boiss.) Kit Tan & Ziel.
- Genista juzepczukii Tzvelev
- Genista kolakowskyi Sachokia
- Genista libanotica Boiss.
- Genista linifolia L.—flax broom
- Genista lobelii DC.
- Genista lucida Cambess.
- Genista maderensis (Webb & Berthel.) Lowe
- Genista majorica Canto & M.J. Sanchez
- Genista melia Boiss.
- Genista michelii Spach
- Genista micrantha Ortega
- Genista microcephala Coss. & Durieu
- Genista microphylla DC.
- Genista millii Boiss.
- Genista mingrelica Albov
- Genista monspessulana (L.) L.A.S. Johnson—French broom, cape broom, Montpellier broom
- Genista morisii Colla
- Genista mugronensis Vierh.
- Genista nevadensis (Esteve & Vara) Rivas Mart., Asensi, Molero Mesa & F. Valle
- Genista nissana Petrovic
- Genista numidica Spach
- Genista obtusiramea Spach
- Genista osmariensis Coss.
- Genista oxycedrina Pomel
- Genista paivae Lowe
- Genista parnassica Halacsy
- Genista pilosa L.
- Genista polyanthos Willk.
- Genista pseudopilosa Coss.
- Genista pulchella Vis.
- Genista quadriflora Munby
- Genista radiata (L.) Scop.
- Genista ramosissima (Desf.) Poir.
- Genista sagittalis L.
- Genista sakellariadis Boiss. & Orph.
- Genista salzmannii DC.
- Genista sanabrensis Valdes Brem. & al.
- Genista sandrasica Hartvig & Strid
- Genista sardoa Vals.
- Genista scorpius (L.) DC.—aulaga
- Genista scythica Pacz.
- Genista segonnei (Maire) P.E. Gibbs
- Genista sericea Wulfen
- Genista sessilifolia DC.
- Genista sibirica L.
- Genista spachiana Webb
- Genista spartioides Spach
- Genista spinulosa Pomel
- Genista splendens Webb & Berthel.
- Genista stenopetala Webb & Berthel.—sweet broom, Easter broom
- Genista suanica Schischkin
- Genista subcapitata Pancic
- Genista sulcitana Vals.
- Genista sylvestris Scop.
  - var. pungens (Vis.) Rehder
  - var. sylvestris Scop.
- Genista taurica Dubovik
- Genista tejedensis (Porto & Rigo) C. Vicioso
- Genista tenera (Murray) Kuntze
- Genista teretifolia Willk.
- Genista tetragona Besser
- Genista thyrrena Vals.
- Genista tinctoria L.—dyer's broom, woodwaxen
  - var. ovata (Waldst. & Kit.) F. W. Schultz
  - var. tinctoria L.
- Genista toluensis Vals.
- Genista tournefortii Spach
- Genista transcaucasica Schischkin
- Genista triacanthos Brot.
- Genista tricuspidata Desf.
- Genista tridens (Cav.) DC.
- Genista tridentata L.
- Genista ulicina Spach
- Genista umbellata (L'Hér.) Poir.
- Genista valentina (Spreng.) Steud.
- Genista verae Juz.
- Genista versicolor Boiss.

== Species names with uncertain taxonomic status ==
The status of the following species is unresolved:

- Genista abyssinica Briq.
- Genista acquinoctialis Briq.
- Genista acutiflora Pau
- Genista acutifolia Spach
- Genista aegyptiaca Spreng.
- Genista aequinoctialis Briq.
- Genista affghanica Briq.
- Genista africana Briq.
- Genista albanica F.K.Mey.
- Genista alpicola Schur
- Genista alpina (Mill.) Spach
- Genista amana Rech.f.
- Genista amarella Lepech.
- Genista americana Spach
- Genista anabaptizata Briq.
- Genista andreana Puiss.
- Genista apetala Spach
- Genista aphylla DC.
- Genista aprutia C.Presl
- Genista arabica (Decne.) Briq.
- Genista arborea Spreng.
- Genista arborea Rouy
- Genista arborescens Mill. ex Spach
- Genista arcuata W.D.J.Koch
- Genista argentea (L.) Noulet
- Genista armata Poir.
- Genista artwinensis Schischk.
- Genista ascendens Briq.
- Genista austriaca (L.) Scheele
- Genista bakeri Briq.
- Genista bakeria Briq.
- Genista balansae (Boiss.) Rouy
- Genista ballii Briq.
- Genista barbara Munby
- Genista benehoavensis (Bolle) del Arco
- Genista bisflorens (Host) Rouy
- Genista bivonae C.Presl
- Genista bocchierii Bacch., Brullo & Feoli Chiapella
- Genista bourgaei Spach ex Nyman
- Genista bracteolata Link
- Genista britannica Rchb.
- Genista brugnieri Spach
- Genista brutia Brullo, Scelsi & Spamp.
- Genista caballeroi Pau ex Caball.
- Genista caespitosa K.Koch
- Genista calcicola Schur
- Genista calycina Briq.
- Genista capensis Spach
- Genista cappadocica Spach
- Genista cassia Boiss.
- Genista catalaunica (Webb) Rouy
- Genista cazorlana Debeaux & E.Rev.
- Genista charegia Coss. ex Batt.
- Genista cilentina Vals.
- Genista cineria DC.
- Genista cirtensis Pomel
- Genista collina Briq.
- Genista commixta Spach
- Genista compressa Sol. ex A.Cunn.
- Genista congesta (Willd.) Poir.
- Genista connata Briq.
- Genista contaminata Poir.
- Genista cordifolia Porta
- Genista coriacea Kit.
- Genista cosoniaca Bernardin ex Gand.
- Genista cossoniana Batt.
- Genista cotinifolia Burm.f.
- Genista crassifolia Briq.
- Genista crebrispina Pomel
- Genista cretica (L.) Spach
- Genista crotalarioides Briq.
- Genista csikii Kümmerle & Jáv.
- Genista cupani Guss.
- Genista cuspidata (Cav.) Spach
- Genista cuspidosa DC.
- Genista cytisoides Spach
- Genista dasycarpa Ball
- Genista daurica G.Nicholson
- Genista defoliata Lam.
- Genista delarbrei Lecoq & Lamotte
- Genista demarcoi Brullo, Scelsi & Siracusa
- Genista densa Poir.
- Genista discolor Webb ex Lowe
- Genista disperma Spach
- Genista divaricata Link
- Genista dorycnioides Briq.
- Genista dumetorum G.Nicholson
- Genista duriaei Spach
- Genista echinata Sennen
- Genista eckloniana Briq.
- Genista elias-sennenii Uribe-Ech. & Urrutia
- Genista elliptica (Willd. ex Spreng.) Steud.
- Genista elliptica Kit.
- Genista elongata Scheele
- Genista elongata (Waldst. & Kit.) E.H.L.Krause
- Genista emirnensis Briq.
- Genista ephedrifolia Pourr. ex Willk. & Lange
- Genista ericetorum Hoffmanns. ex Spreng.
- Genista erinacea Gilib.
- Genista erinaceoides (Loisel.) Vierh.
- Genista eriocarpa Kunze
- Genista europaea E.H.L.Krause
- Genista exaltata Link ex DC.
- Genista filifolia Licht. ex Walp.
- Genista filiformis Briq.
- Genista flaccida Briq.
- Genista foliolosa Link
- Genista formosa Carrière
- Genista fragrans Spach
- Genista friedrichsthaliana C.Presl
- Genista fritschii Rech.
- Genista frutescens Schloss. & Vuk.
- Genista gaditana Rouy
- Genista galioides Spach
- Genista gasparini C. Presl
- Genista genuensis Pers.
- Genista glabra Spach
- Genista gracilis Poir.
- Genista gracilis Spach
- Genista grandiflora (DC.) Spach
- Genista grossii Font Quer
- Genista gymnoptera Duby ex Nyman
- Genista halleri Reyn. ex DC.
- Genista harveyi Briq.
- Genista herbacea Lam.
- Genista hillebrandii Christ
- Genista hirta Rouy
- Genista hybrida E.H.L. Krause
- Genista hypericifolia Herb. ex Colla
- Genista incana Briq.
- Genista incerta Friv. ex Griseb.
- Genista incubacea Schur
- Genista inermis Gilib.
- Genista inermis Pančić
- Genista infesta G.Don
- Genista inops Boiss. & Balansa
- Genista insularis Bacch., Brullo & Feoli Chiapella
- Genista interrupta (Cav.) Steud.
- Genista italica Lodd. ex G.Don
- Genista jacquiniana Scheele
- Genista jaubertii Spach
- Genista jimenezii Pau ex Munuera
- Genista jordani Shuttlew. ex Rouy & Fouc.
- Genista jordanii Shuttlew.
- Genista juasi Buch.-Ham. ex D.Don
- Genista juncea Scop.
- Genista kabylica Coss. ex Batt.
- Genista kochii Rouy
- Genista kotschyi Briq.
- Genista laburnum (L.) E.H.L.Krause
- Genista lampropphylla Spach
- Genista lanigera Spach
- Genista laricifolia Burm.f.
- Genista leptophylla Spach
- Genista lipskii (Novopokr. & Schischk.) Novopokr. & Schischk.
- Genista longirostrata Sennen
- Genista lunaris Briq.
- Genista macrobotrys (Maire & Sennen) Sennen
- Genista madoniensis Raimondo
- Genista maroccana Briq.
- Genista martinii Verguin & Soulie
- Genista mauritiana Pau & Sennen
- Genista microsoma Briq.
- Genista millani Caball.
- Genista milli Heldr. ex Boiss.
- Genista minima Bubani
- Genista minor Lam.
- Genista minor Guillon ex Verl.
- Genista moesiaca Velen.
- Genista mogadorensis Pau
- Genista moleroi Talavera & P.E.Gibbs
- Genista mollis (Cav.) DC.
- Genista montbretii Spach
- Genista multibracteata Tausch
- Genista multicaulis Lam.
- Genista myrtifolia Burm.f.
- Genista nervata Hoppe ex Griseb.
- Genista nigricans (L.) Scheele ex Briq.
- Genista nigricans (L.) E.H.L.Krause
- Genista nitens (Willd.) Steud.
- Genista nitida Formánek
- Genista nodosa Tausch
- Genista notarisii Rouy
- Genista nubigena Link
- Genista nuda (Willd.) Steud.
- Genista obsoleta (Eckl. & Zeyh.) Briq.
- Genista odorata Moench
- Genista odoratissima Spach
- Genista odoratissima Pourr.
- Genista oliverii Spach
- Genista orientalis Spach
- Genista ornithopodioides (Jaub. & Spach) Briq.
- Genista ottomanica Formánek
- Genista ovina Bacch., Brullo & Feoli Chiapella
- Genista palmatiformis Maire & Sennen, in Sennen
- Genista palmiformis (Sennen & Mauricio ex Maire) Maire & Sennen
- Genista parviflora Brot.
- Genista parvifolia G.Don
- Genista pauciflorum Briq.
- Genista pedunculata L'Hér.
- Genista peloponnesiaca Spach
- Genista pendulina Lam.
- Genista persica Poir.
- Genista pestalozzae Boiss.
- Genista petitiana (A.Rich.) Briq.
- Genista philippi Lindl.
- Genista phrygia Bornm.
- Genista pichisermolliana Vals.
- Genista pilocarpa Link
- Genista pinastrifolia Spach
- Genista polygalaefolia DC.
- Genista polygalaephylla Brot.
- Genista polyphylla (Eckl. & Zeyh.) Briq.
- Genista polysperma Briq.
- Genista polytricha Spach
- Genista pomeli Mares & Vigineix
- Genista pomeliana Maire
- Genista pomelii Marès & Vigin.
- Genista postranensis Formánek
- Genista pratensis Pollini
- Genista pseudoumbellata Caball.
- Genista pteroclada (Boiss.) Spach
- Genista pulverulenta Fisch. & C.A.Mey.
- Genista pungens Poir.
- Genista purpurea (Scop.) E.H.L.Krause
- Genista ramentacea (Sieber) Briq.
- Genista ratisbonensis (Schaeff.) E.H.L.Krause
- Genista raymundi Maire & Sennen, in Sennen & Mauricio
- Genista retama G.Nicholson
- Genista rhodophon Webb ex Delile
- Genista rhodorhizoides Webb & Berthel.
- Genista richteri Rouy
- Genista rigens C.Presl
- Genista rosea (Jaub. & Spach) Briq.
- Genista rostrata Poir.
- Genista salditana Pomel
- Genista salesii Sennen
- Genista salicifolia Dippel
- Genista sauzeana (Burnham & Briq.) Rouy
- Genista schimperiana (Hochst.) Briq.
- Genista scolopendria Spach
- Genista scolopendrina Willk.
- Genista scoparia (L.) Lam.
- Genista scoparia Chaix
- Genista scopolii Rouy
- Genista scorpia St.-Lag.
- Genista scorpionia St.-Lag.
- Genista sennenii Font Quer ex Sennen
- Genista sepiaria Lam.
- Genista sessiliflora Briq.
- Genista sigeriana Fuss
- Genista silana Brullo, Gangale & Spamp.
- Genista sophoroides Spach
- Genista spathulata Spach
- Genista sphaerocarpa (L.) Lam.
- Genista spicata Eckl. & Zeyh. ex Meisn.
- Genista spiniflora Lam.
- Genista stenocarpa Janka
- Genista stenophylla Schur
- Genista stipulacea (Eckl. & Zeyh.) Briq.
- Genista stylosa (Spreng.) G.Don
- Genista subsecunda Schur
- Genista subsericans (Bornm.) Rech.f.
- Genista supranubia (L.f.) Spach
- Genista syriaca (Boiss. & Blanche) Boiss. & Blanche
- Genista tamarrutii Caball.
- Genista tchihatchewi Boiss.
- Genista tenella Willk.
- Genista tenorei G.Don
- Genista tenorii Steud.
- Genista tenorii G. Don
- Genista tenuispina Samp.
- Genista thebaica Spach
- Genista thyrsiflora G.Nicholson
- Genista tomentella Boiss. & Noë
- Genista tomentosa Poir.
- Genista transsilvanica Schur
- Genista trigonelloides (Jaub. & Spach) Briq.
- Genista tripolitana Bornm.
- Genista triquetra (Lam.) L'Hér.
- Genista triquetra Willd.
- Genista triquetra Waldst. & Kit.
- Genista tyrrhena Vals.
- Genista undulata Link
- Genista uniflora (Decne.) Briq.
- Genista valdes-bermejoi Talavera & L.Sáez
- Genista valsecchiae Brullo & De Marco
- Genista velutina (Eckl. & Zeyh.) Briq.
- Genista versiflora Tausch
- Genista villosa Lam.
- Genista villosa Spach
- Genista vulgaris Garsault
- Genista vulgaris Gray
- Genista vuralii A.Duran & Dural
- Genista walpersiana Briq.
- Genista weldeniana Scheele
- Genista zeyheri Briq.

== Hybrids ==
The following hybrids have been described:

- Genista ×altoportillensis Egido & Puente García
- Genista ×arizagae Elorza et al.
- Genista ×fritschii Rech.
- Genista ×martinii Verg. & Soulié
- Genista ×norpalentina J.M.Aparicio et al.
- Genista ×oweniana auct.
- Genista ×rivasgodayana J.Andrés & Llamas
- Genista ×segurae Uribe-Ech. & Urrutia
- Genista ×uribe-echebarriae Urrutia
