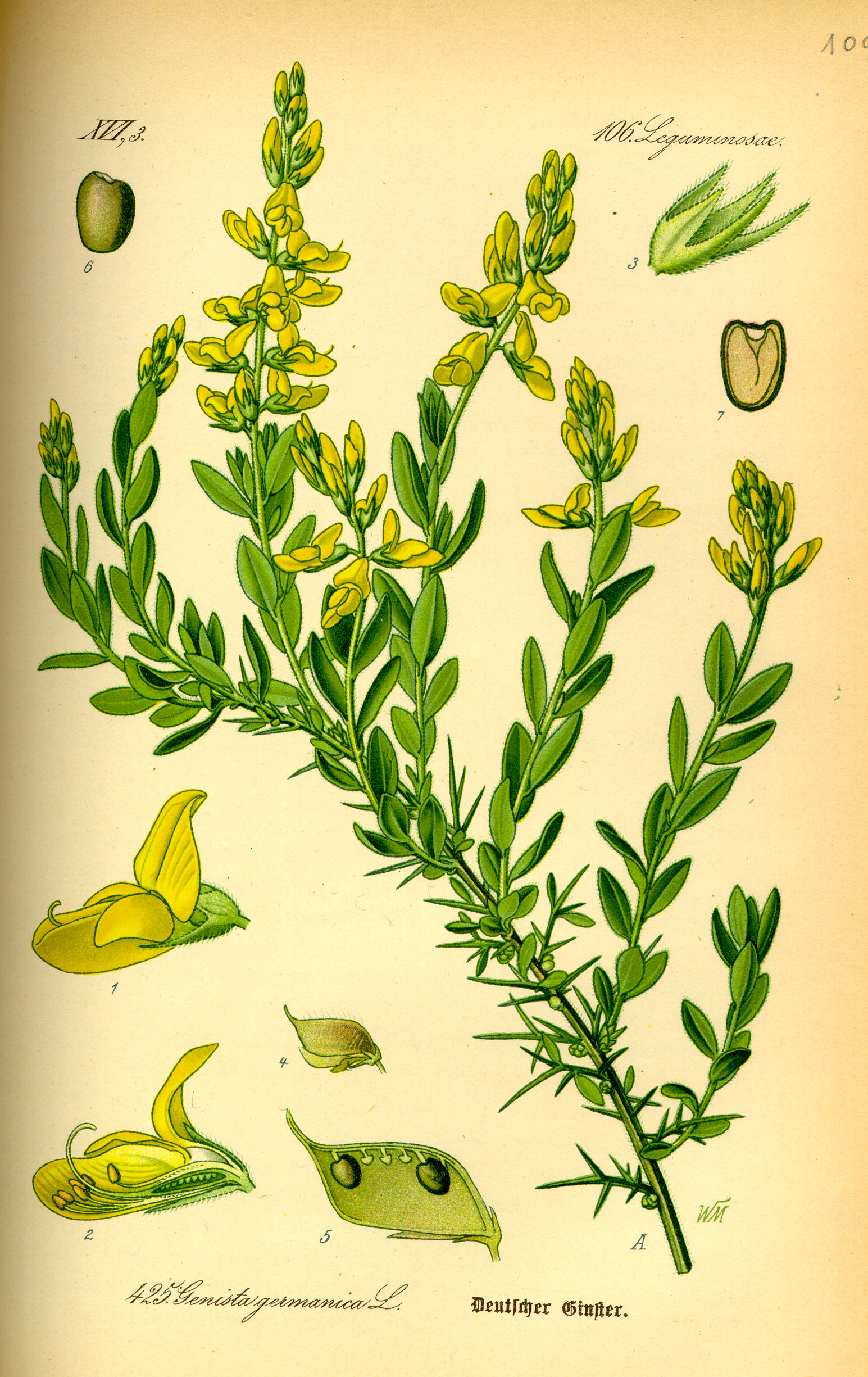
- Illustration from Flora von Deutschland, Österreich und der Schweiz (1885)

Scientific classification
- Kingdom: Plantae
- Clade: Tracheophytes
- Clade: Angiosperms
- Clade: Eudicots
- Clade: Rosids
- Order: Fabales
- Family: Fabaceae
- Subfamily: Faboideae
- Genus: Genista
- Species: G. germanica

Binomial name
- Genista germanica L.

= Genista germanica =

Species of plant

Genista germanica, the German greenweed, is a plant species in the genus Genista belonging to the family Fabaceae.

== Distribution and habitat ==
This species grows in Central Europe, Western Europe and Southern Europe (Belarus, Estonia, Lithuania, Russian Federation, Ukraine, Austria, Belgium, Czechoslovakia; Germany, Hungary, Netherlands, Poland, Switzerland, Denmark, Sweden, Bulgaria, Former Yugoslavia, Italy, Romania, France). These shrubs can be found in thickets, poor pastures, heaths and dry meadows, preferably on acidic soils, usually between 0–800 metres (0–2,625 ft), rarely up to 1,400 metres (4,600 ft) above sea level.

== Description ==
Genista germanica can grow to 0.6 metres (2 ft 0 in). These small perennial shrubs may have erect or prostrate stems, woody at the base, with robust simple or branched thorns. Only the young branches are green, slightly hairy. The deciduous leaves are oval-lanceolate, bright green and pubescent. The flowers, hermaphrodite, are gathered in short racemes, the calyx is pubescent with lanceolate teeth, the corolla is yellow. They bloom in May and June. The fruits are ovoid legumes of about 10 mm, with 2 to 4 ovoid, brownish seeds.

== Gallery ==
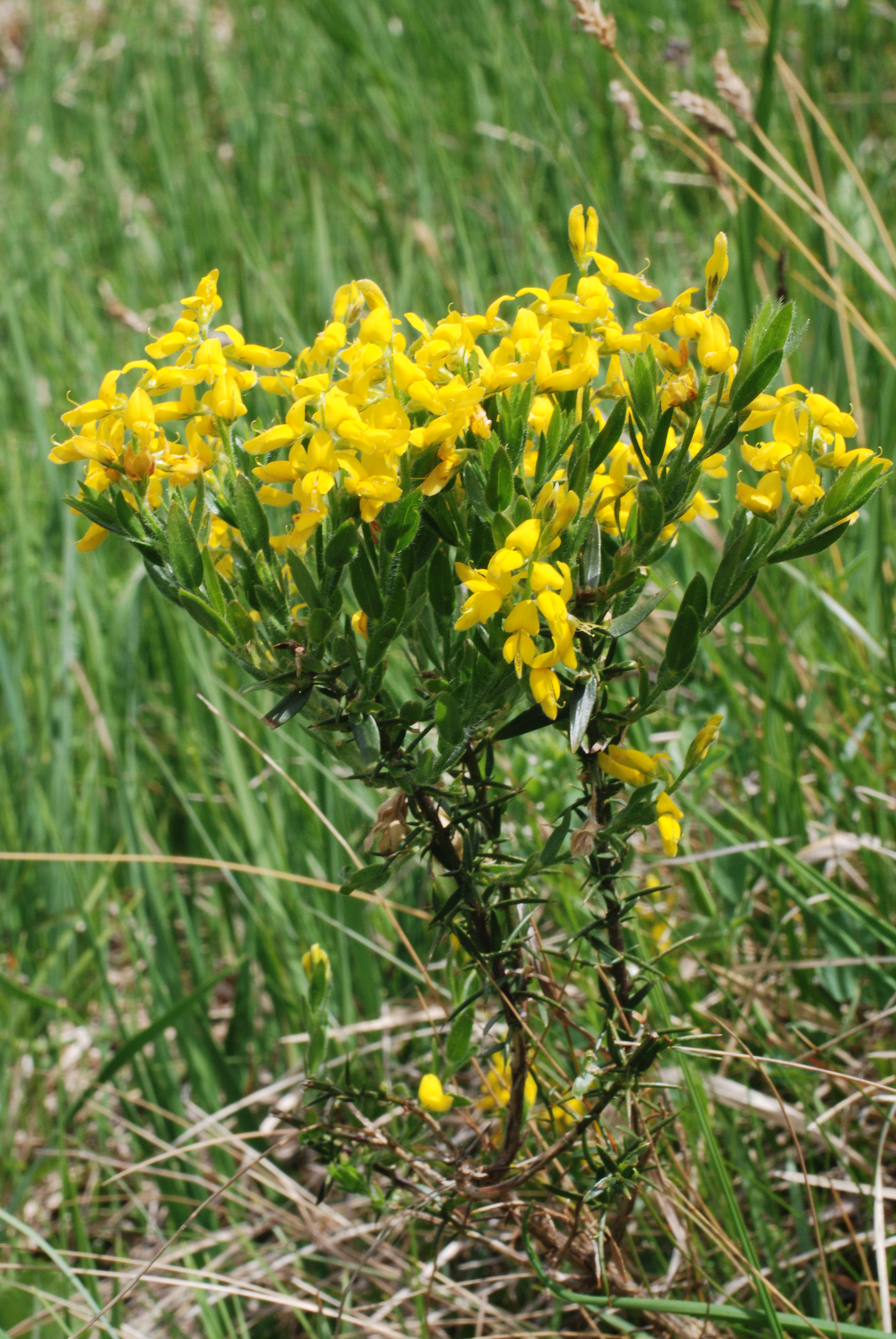
Plant of Genista germanica

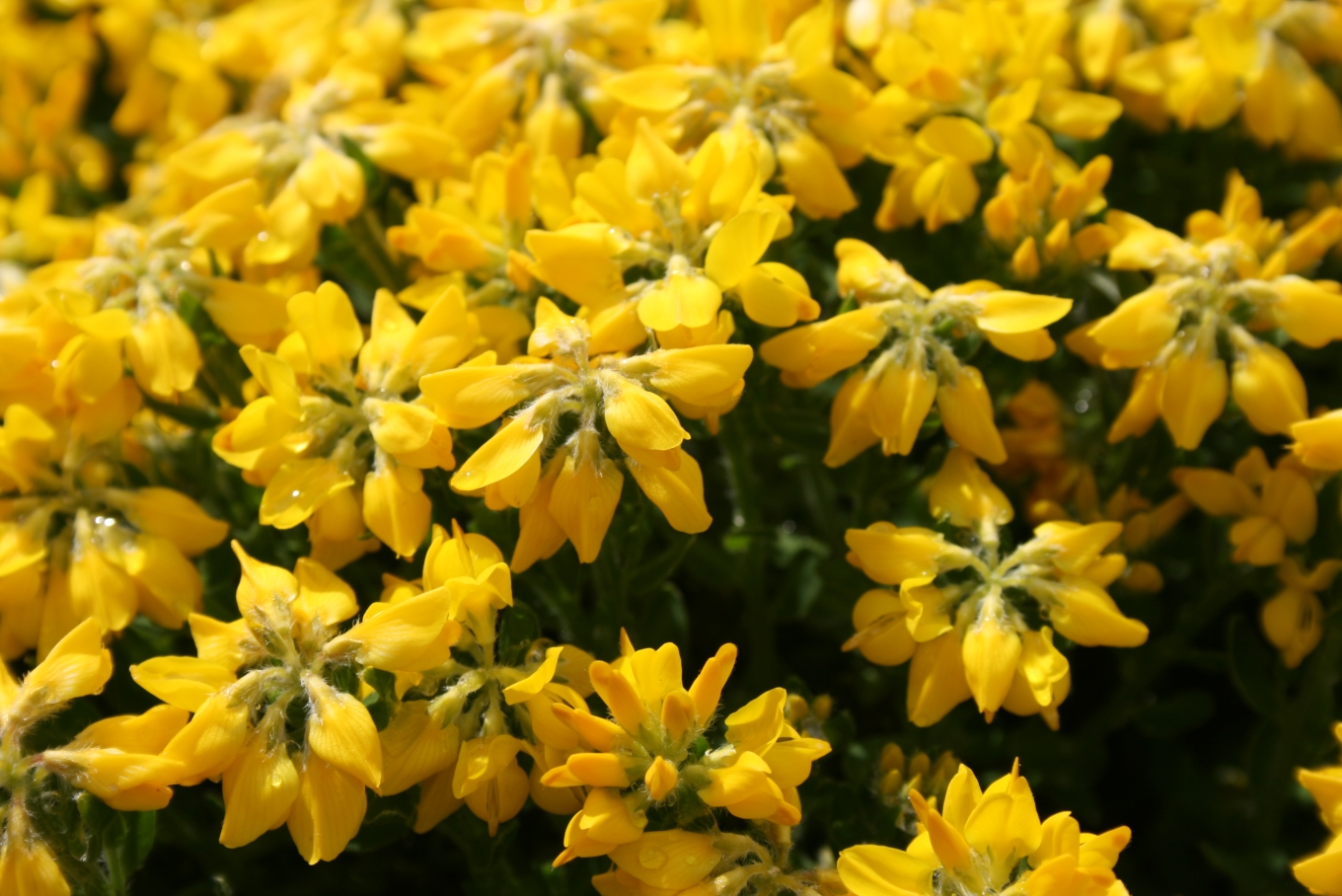
Close-up on flowers

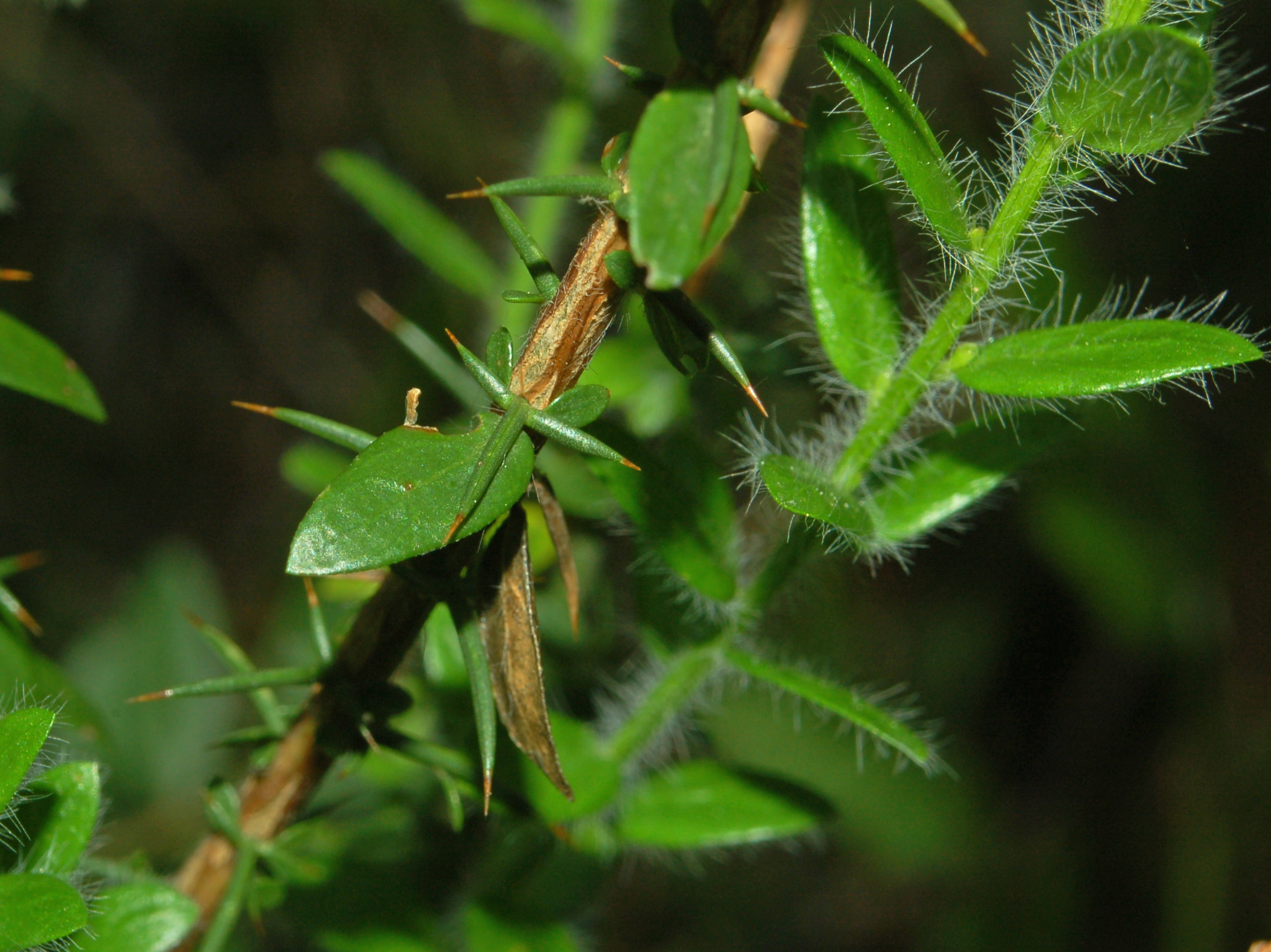
Leaves and thorns

== Bibliography ==
- Gibbs, P. E. 1966. A revision of the genus Genista L. Notes Roy. Bot. Gard. Edinburgh 27:70.
- Liberty Hyde Bailey Hortorium Hortus third. 1976 (Hortus 3)
- Pignatti, S. Flora d'Italia. 1982
- Turland, N. J. & C. E. Jarvis 1997. Typification of Linnaean specific and varietal names in the Leguminosae (Fabaceae) (Taxon) 46:470.
- Tutin, T. G. et al., eds. Flora europaea. 1964-1980
- Yakovlev, G. P. et al. Legumes of Northern Eurasia. 1996
