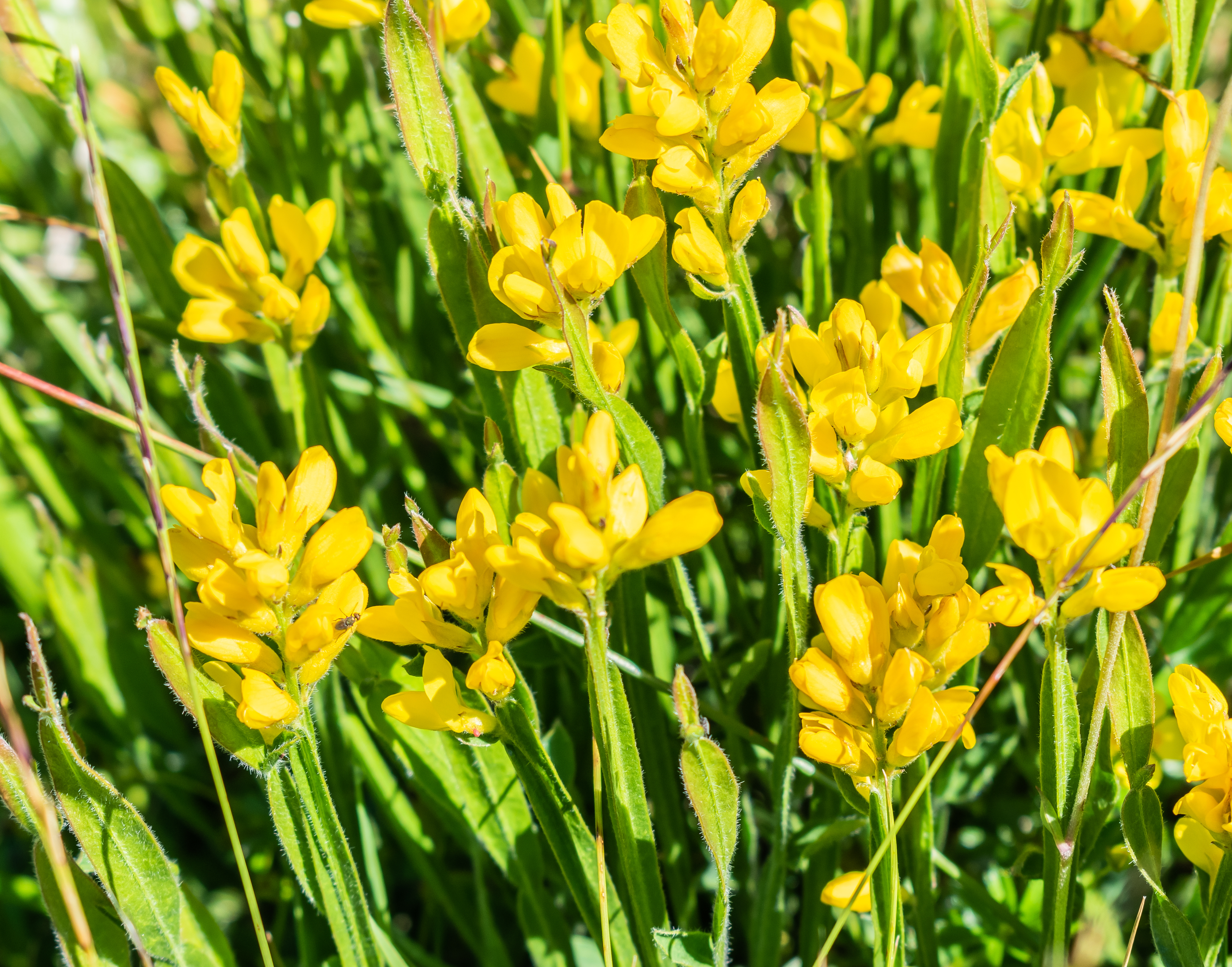
- Flowers
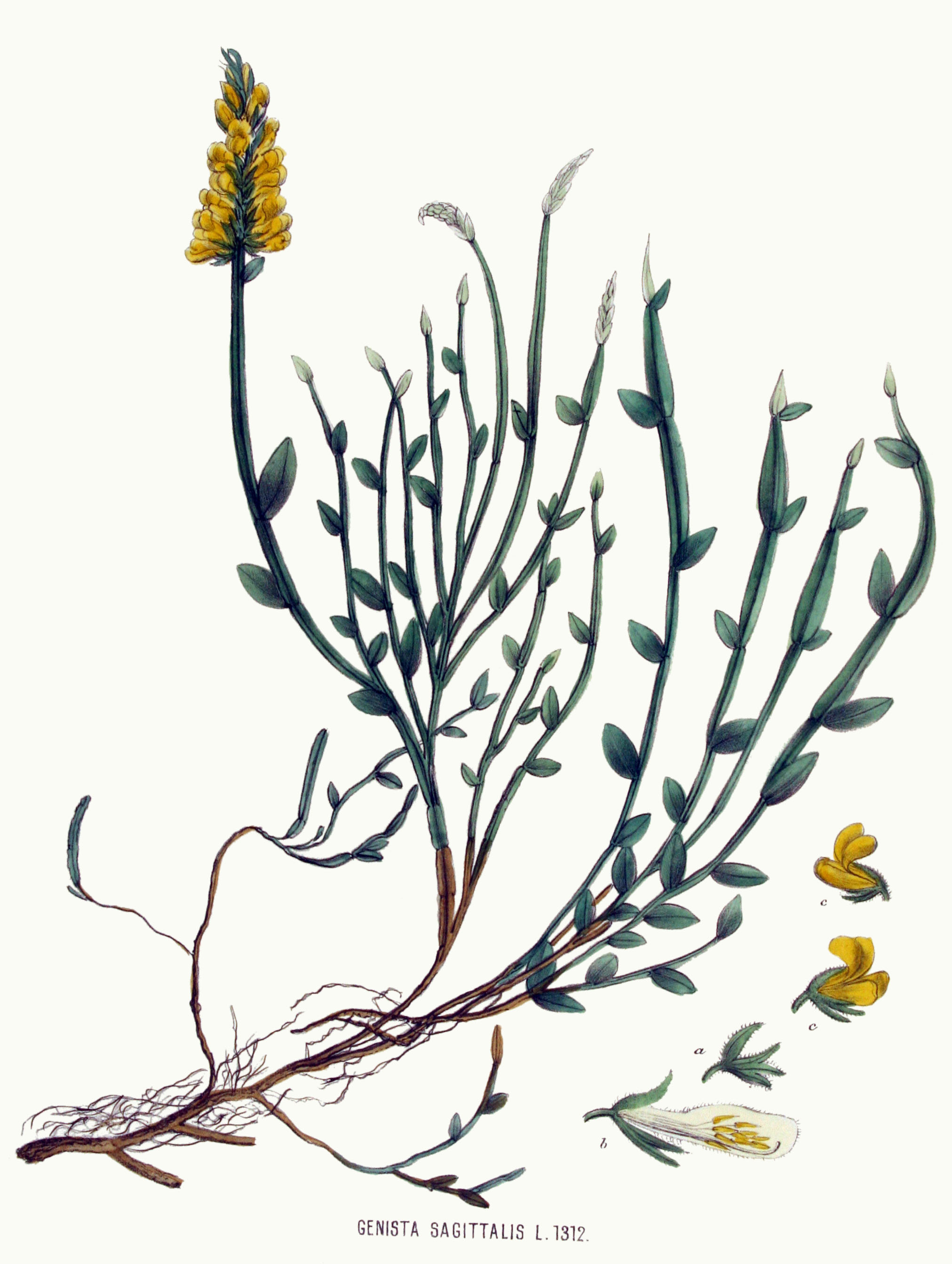
- Botanical illustration

Scientific classification
- Kingdom: Plantae
- Clade: Tracheophytes
- Clade: Angiosperms
- Clade: Eudicots
- Clade: Rosids
- Order: Fabales
- Family: Fabaceae
- Subfamily: Faboideae
- Genus: Genista
- Species: G. sagittalis

Binomial name
- Genista sagittalis L.

Synonyms
- List: Chamaespartium sagittale (L.) P.E.Gibbs; Chamaespartium sagittale var. vilosa Kuzmanov; Cytisus sagittalis (L.) W.D.J.Koch; Euteline sagittalis (L.) Raf.; Genista herbacea Lam.; Genista minima Bubani; Genista minor Guillon ex Verl.; Genista tetragona Vill. ex Verl.; Genistella racemosa Moench; Genistella sagittalis (L.) Gams; Pterospartum sagittale (L.) Willk.; Saltzwedelia sagittalis (L.) G.Gaertn., B.Mey. & Scherb.; Saltzwedelia tetragona Fourr.; Spartium sagittale (L.) Roth; Syspone sagittalis (L.) Griseb.; Telinaria sagittalis (L.) C.Presl

= Genista sagittalis =

Species of flowering plant

Genista sagittalis, called the arrow-jointed broom and winged broom, is a species of flowering plant in the genus Genista, native to central and southern Europe, Ukraine, and Anatolia. Its subspecies Genista sagittalis subsp. delphinensis, called rock broom, has gained the Royal Horticultural Society's Award of Garden Merit.

== Subtaxa ==
The following subspecies are currently accepted:

- Genista sagittalis subsp. delphinensis (Verl.) Greuter
- Genista sagittalis subsp. sagittalis
- Genista sagittalis subsp. undulata (Ern) Greuter
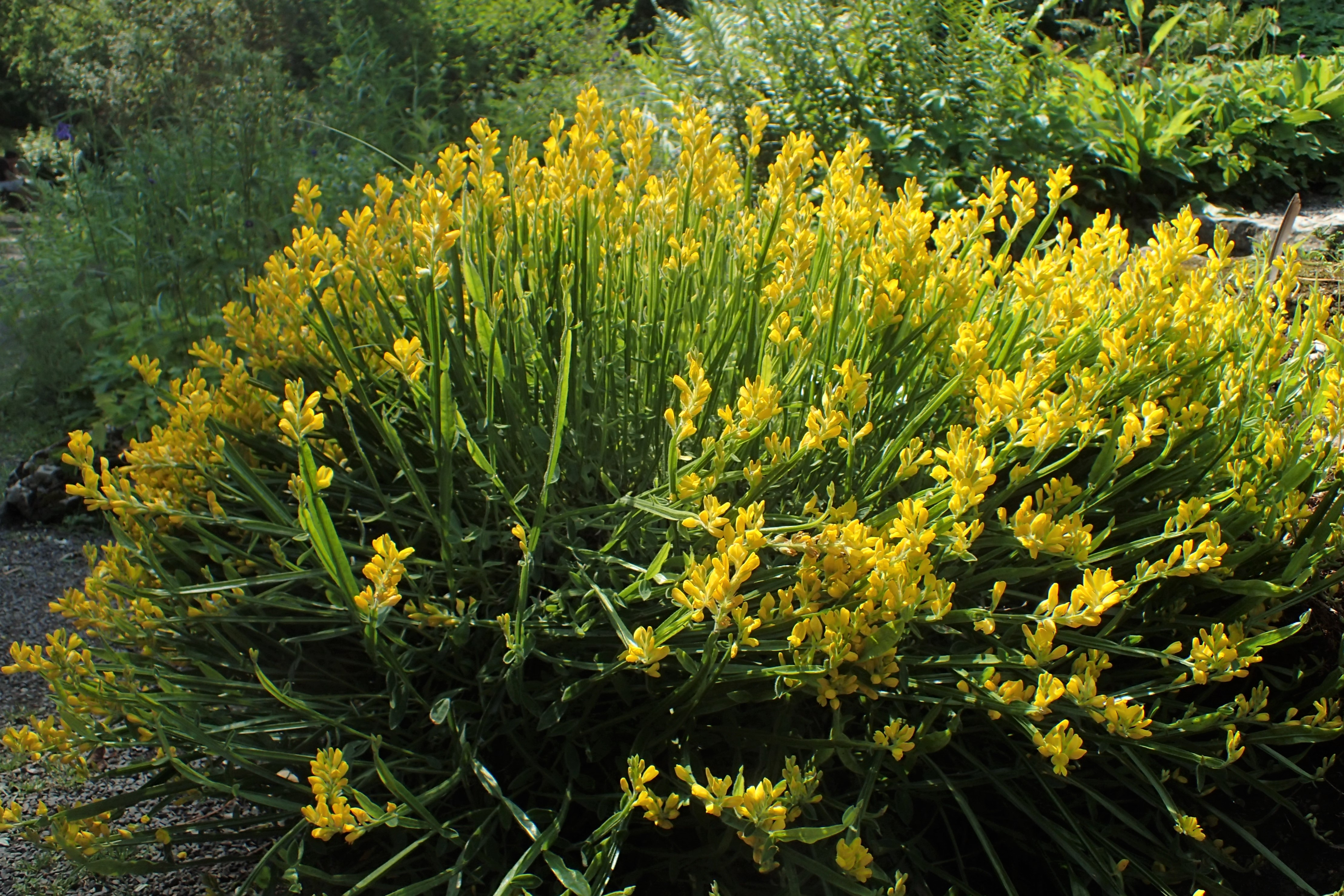
Broom-like habit

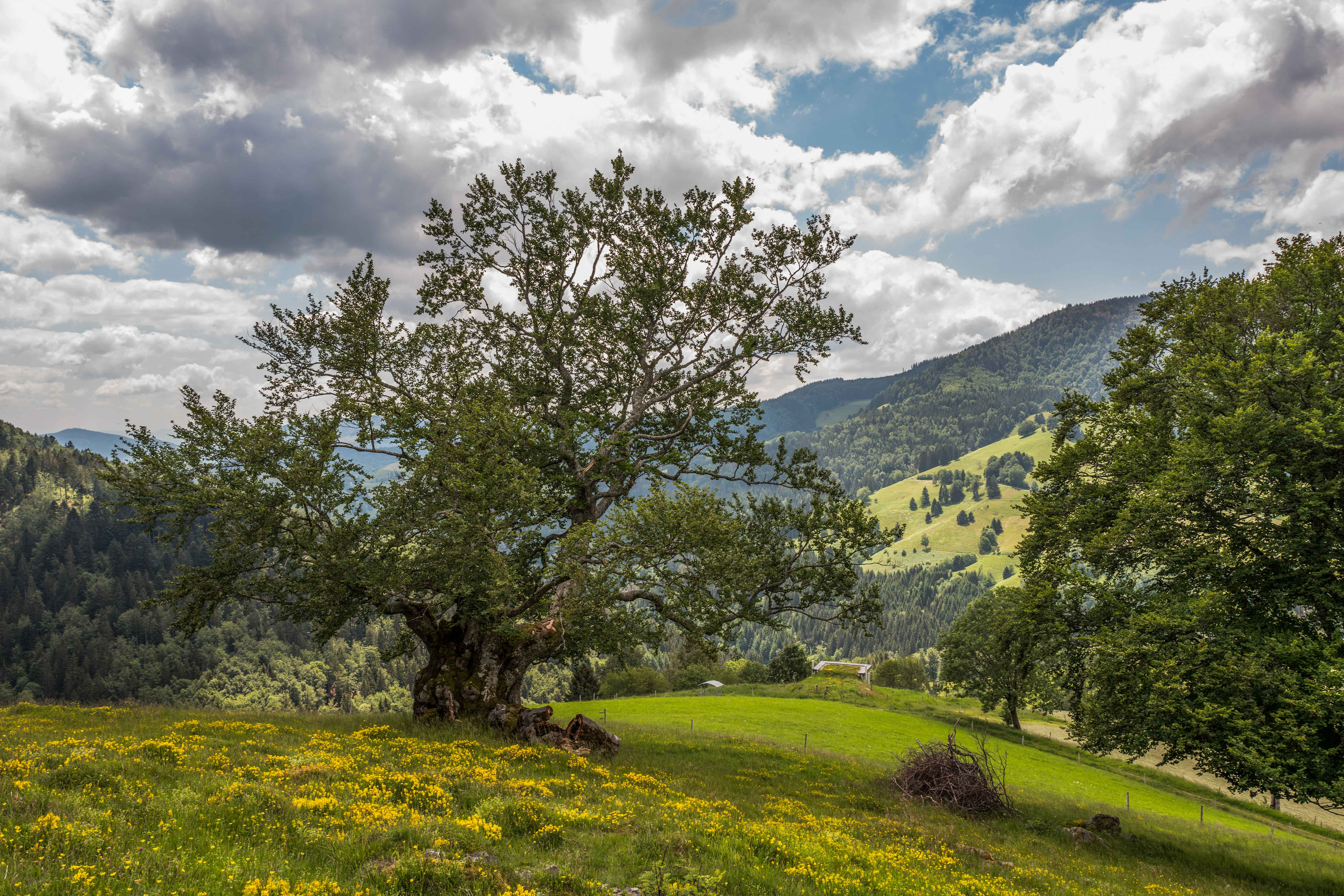
In a high pasture in the southern Black Forest region

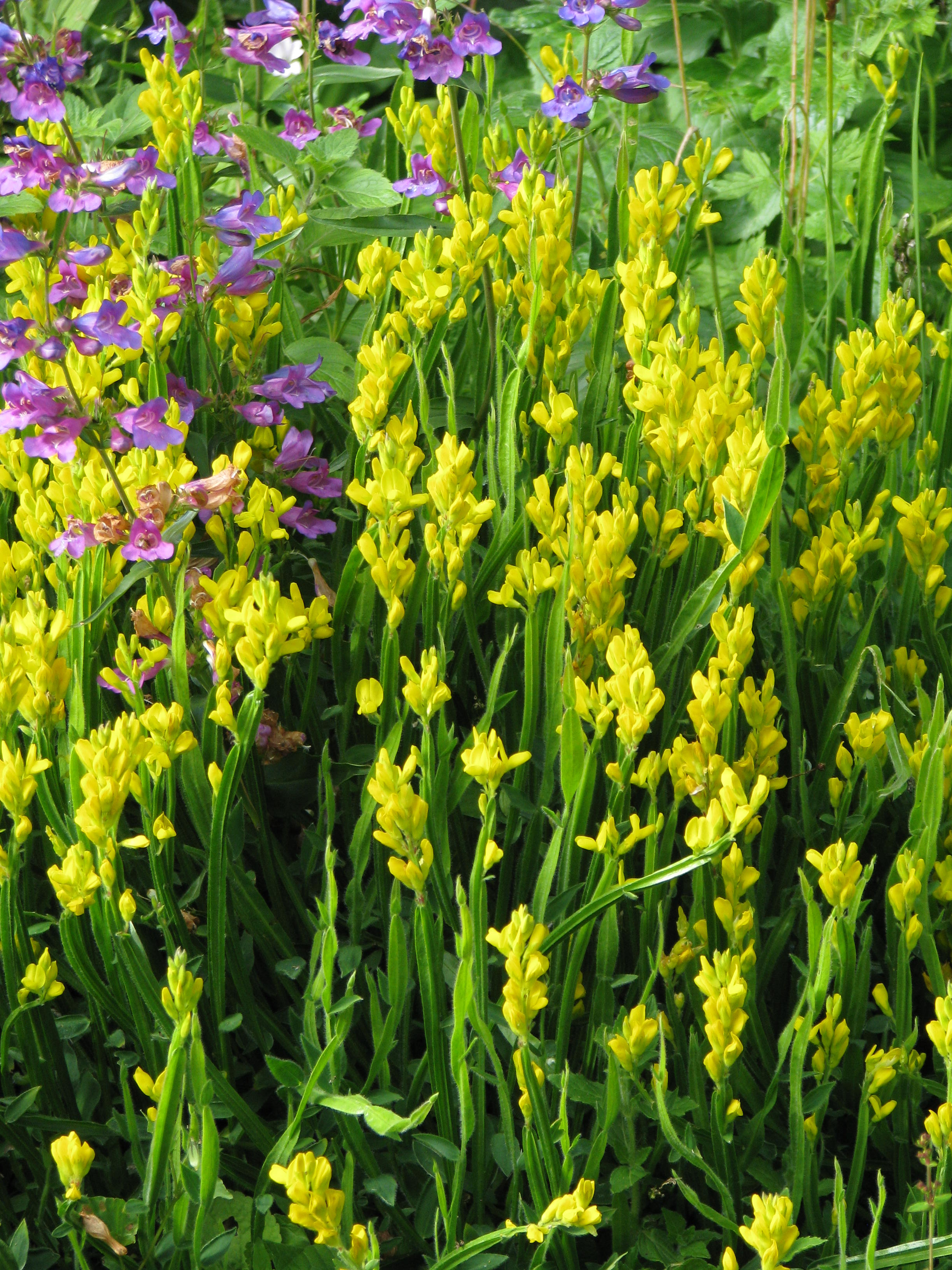
In a garden setting

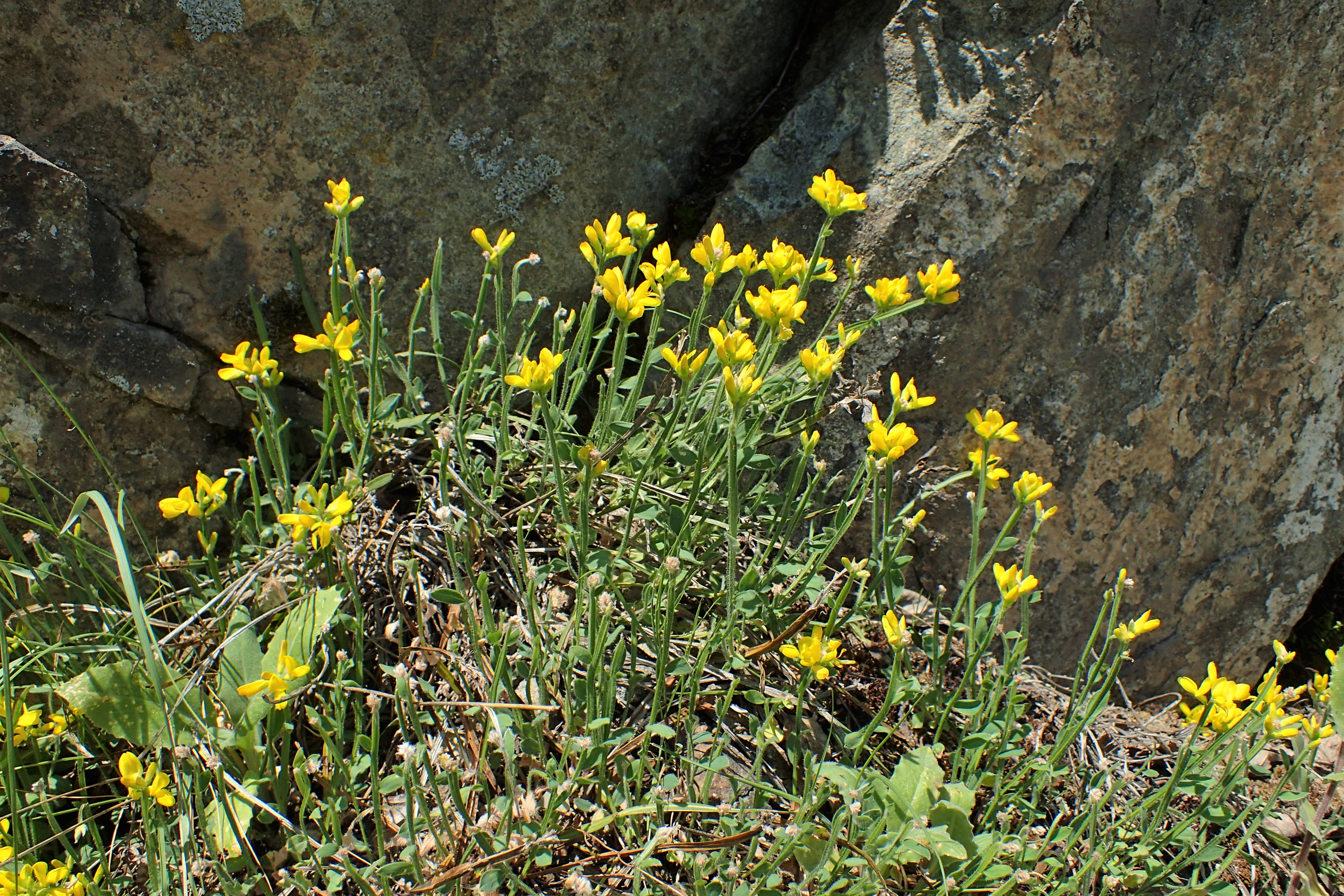
In the wild on Mt. Vitosha in Bulgaria

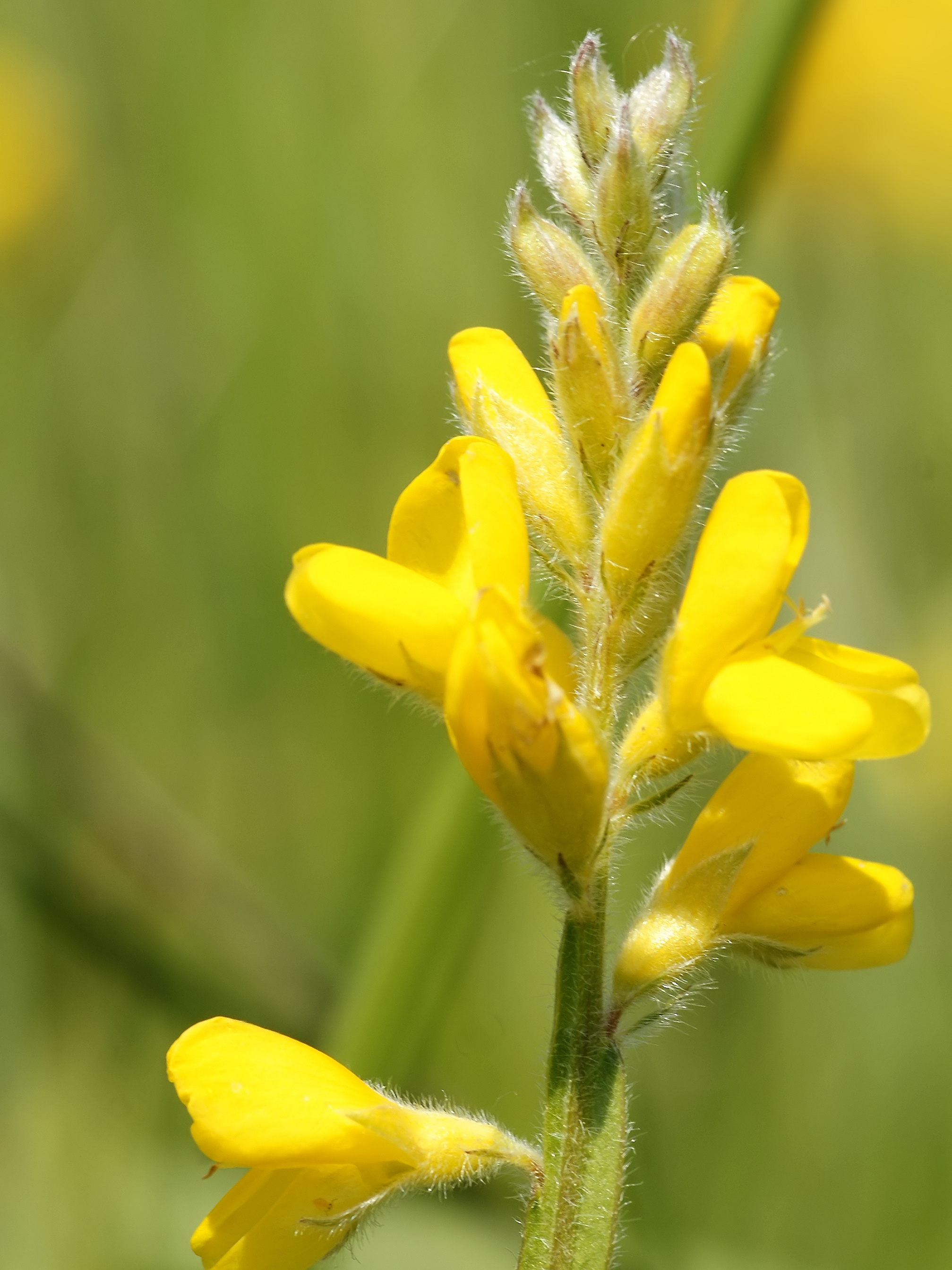
Close up of flowers

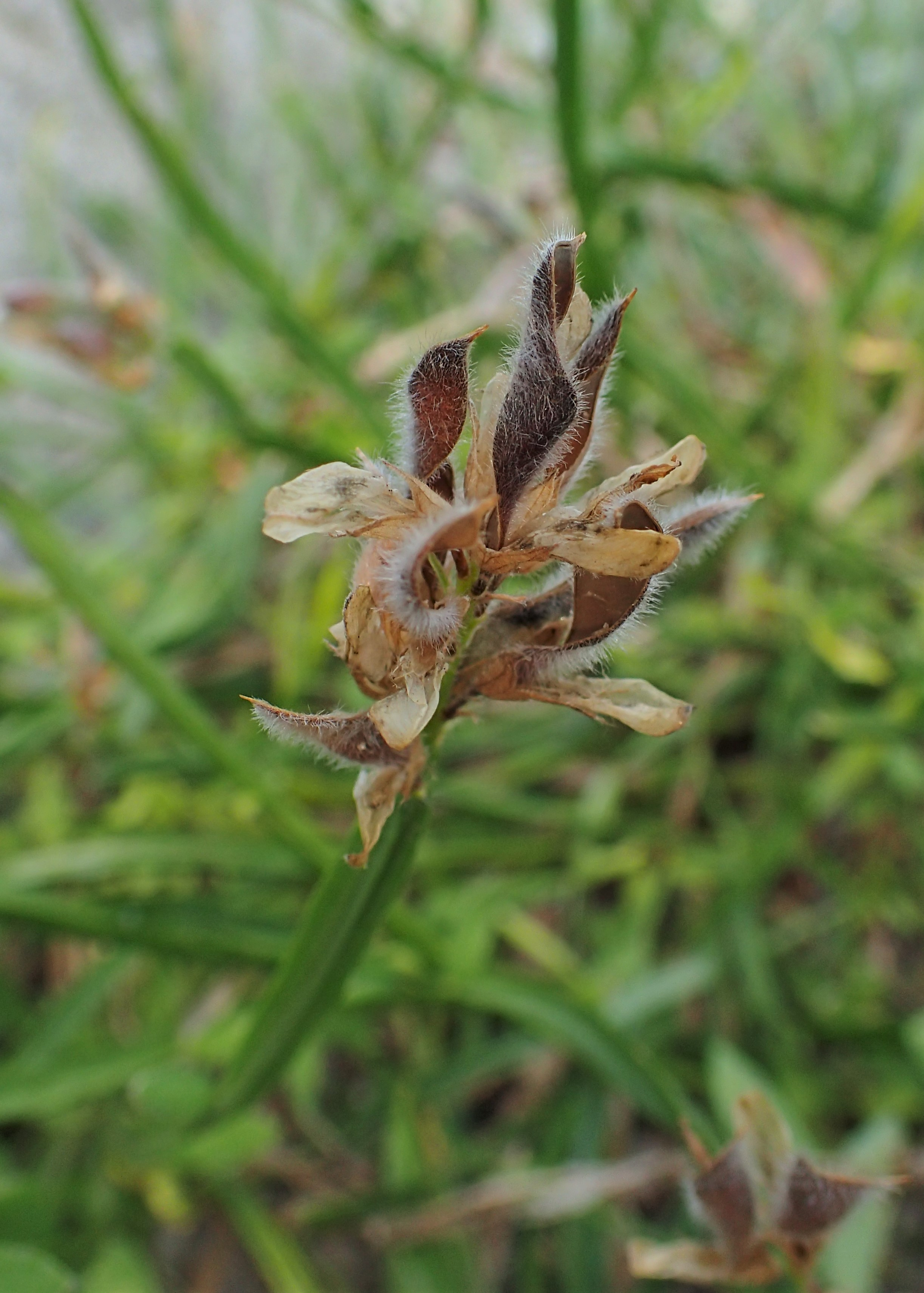
After releasing seeds
