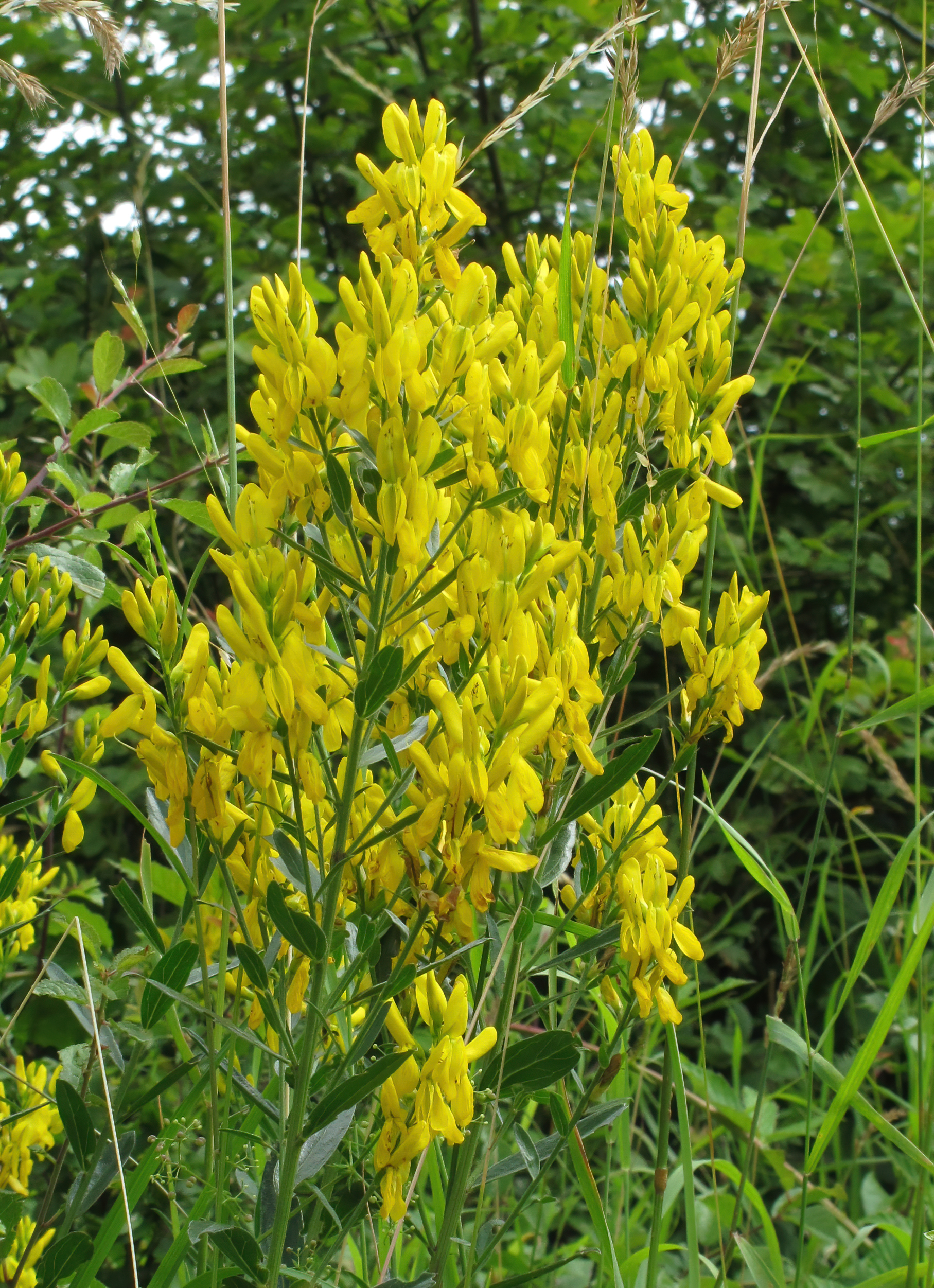
- Found in Germany
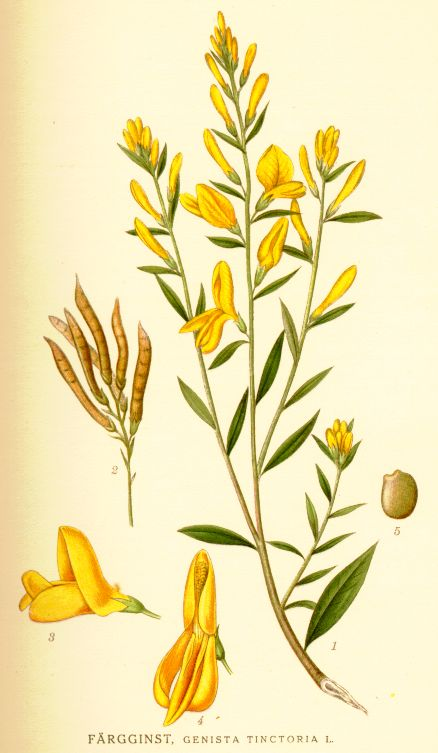
- Illustration from Bilder ur Nordens Flora

Conservation status
- Unranked (NatureServe)

Scientific classification
- Kingdom: Plantae
- Clade: Tracheophytes
- Clade: Angiosperms
- Clade: Eudicots
- Clade: Rosids
- Order: Fabales
- Family: Fabaceae
- Subfamily: Faboideae
- Genus: Genista
- Species: G. tinctoria

Binomial name
- Genista tinctoria L.

Synonyms
- List: Cytisus tinctoria (L.) Vis.; Genista alpestris Bertol.; Genista anxantica Ten.; Genista borysthenica Kotov; Genista campestris Janka; Genista donetzica Kotov; Genista elata (Moench) Wender.; Genista elatior Koch; Genista humilis Ten.; Genista hungarica A. Kern.; Genista lasiocarpa Spach; Genista mantica Pollini; Genista marginata Besser; Genista mayeri Janka; Genista oligosperma (Andrae) Simonk.; Genista ovata Waldst. & Kit.; Genista patula M. Bieb.; Genista perreymondii Loisel.; Genista ptilophylla Spach; Genista pubescens O. Lang; Genista rupestris Schur; Genista sibirica L.; Genista tanaitica P.A. Smirn.; Genista tenuifolia Loisel.; Genista tinctoria var. campestris (Janka)Morariu; Genista tinctoria var. oligosperma Andrae; Genista tinctoria subsp. oligosperma Andrae; Genista virgata Willd.; Genistoides elata Moench; Genistoides tinctoria (L.) Moench

= Genista tinctoria =

Species of flowering plant

Genista tinctoria, the dyer's greenweed or dyer's broom, is a species of flowering plant in the family Fabaceae. Its other common names include dyer's whin, waxen woad and waxen wood. The Latin specific epithet tinctoria means "used as a dye".

== Description ==
It is a variable deciduous shrub growing to 60–90 centimetres (24–35 in) tall by 100 cm (39 in) wide, the stems woody, slightly hairy, and branched. The alternate, nearly sessile leaves are glabrous and lanceolate. Golden yellow pea-like flowers are borne in erect narrow racemes from spring to early summer. The fruit is a long, shiny pod shaped like a green bean pod.

== Distribution and habitat ==
This species is native to meadows and pastures in Europe and Turkey.

== Properties and uses ==
Numerous cultivars have been selected for garden use, of which 'Royal Gold' has gained the Royal Horticultural Society's Award of Garden Merit.

The plant, as its Latin and common names suggest, has been used from ancient times for producing a yellow dye, which combined with woad also provides a green colour.

It was from this plant that the isoflavone genistein was first isolated in 1899; hence the name of the chemical compound. The medicinal parts are the flowering twigs.

The plant has been used in popular medicine and herbalism for various complaints, including skin diseases, even in modern times.

== Gallery ==
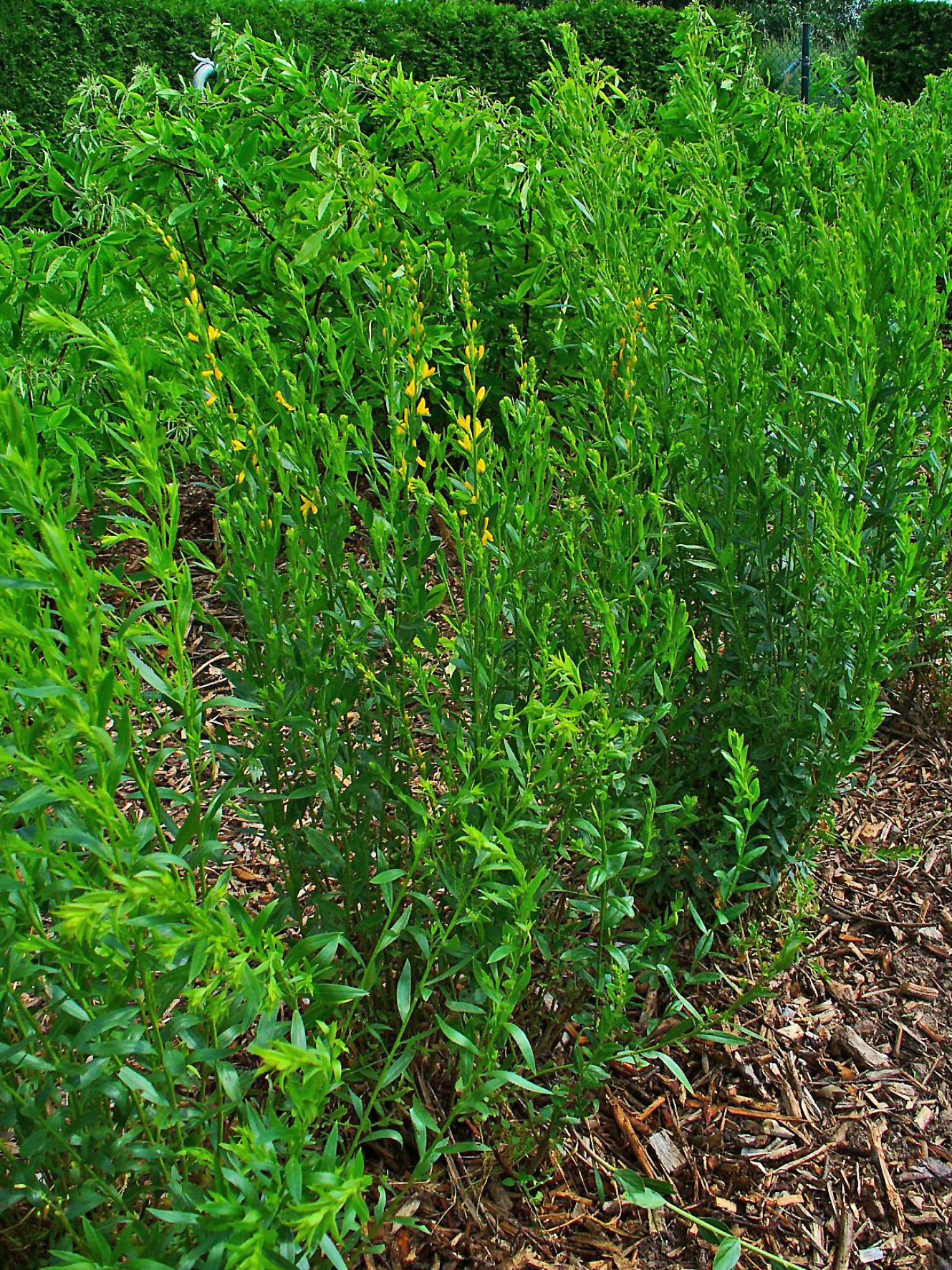

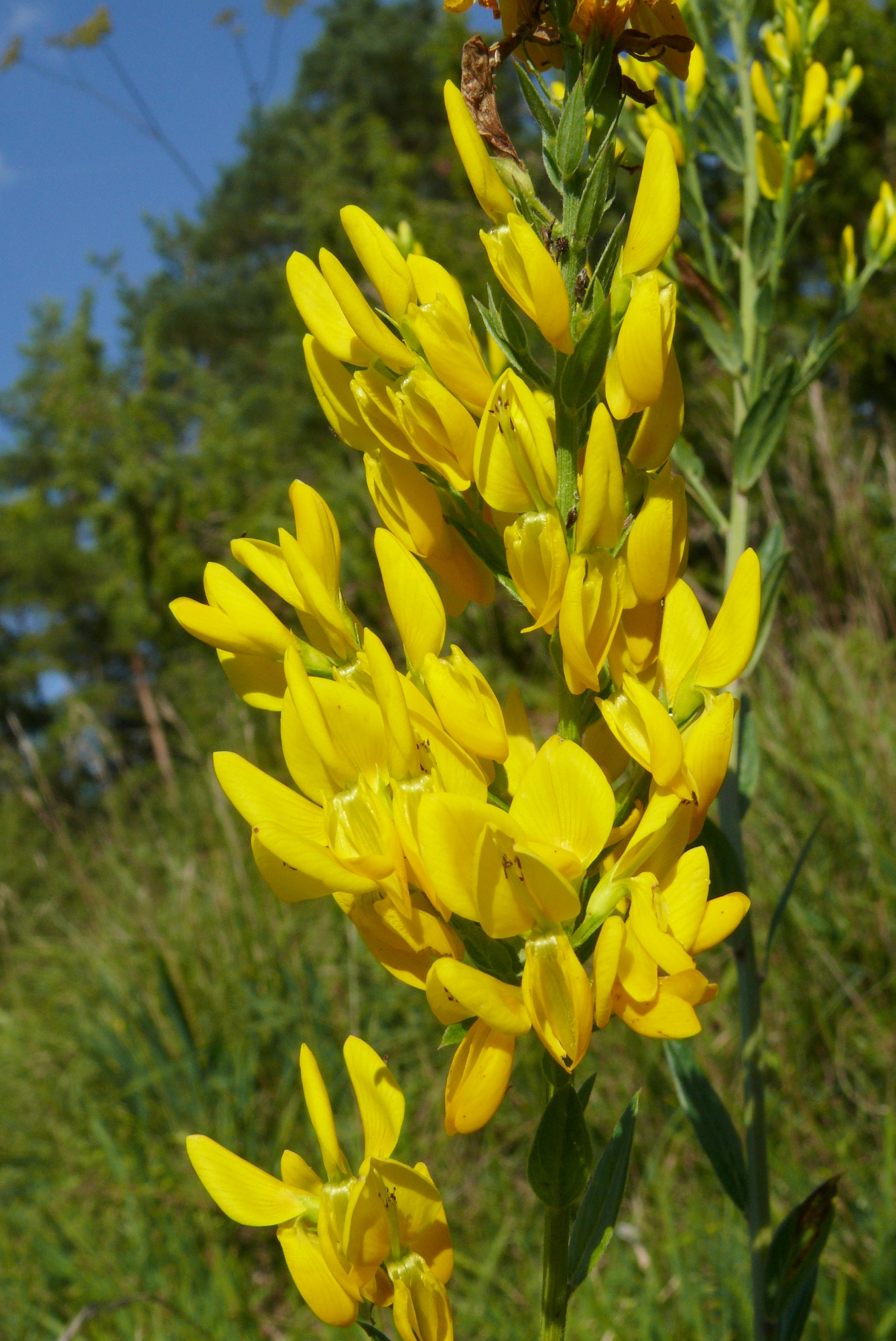

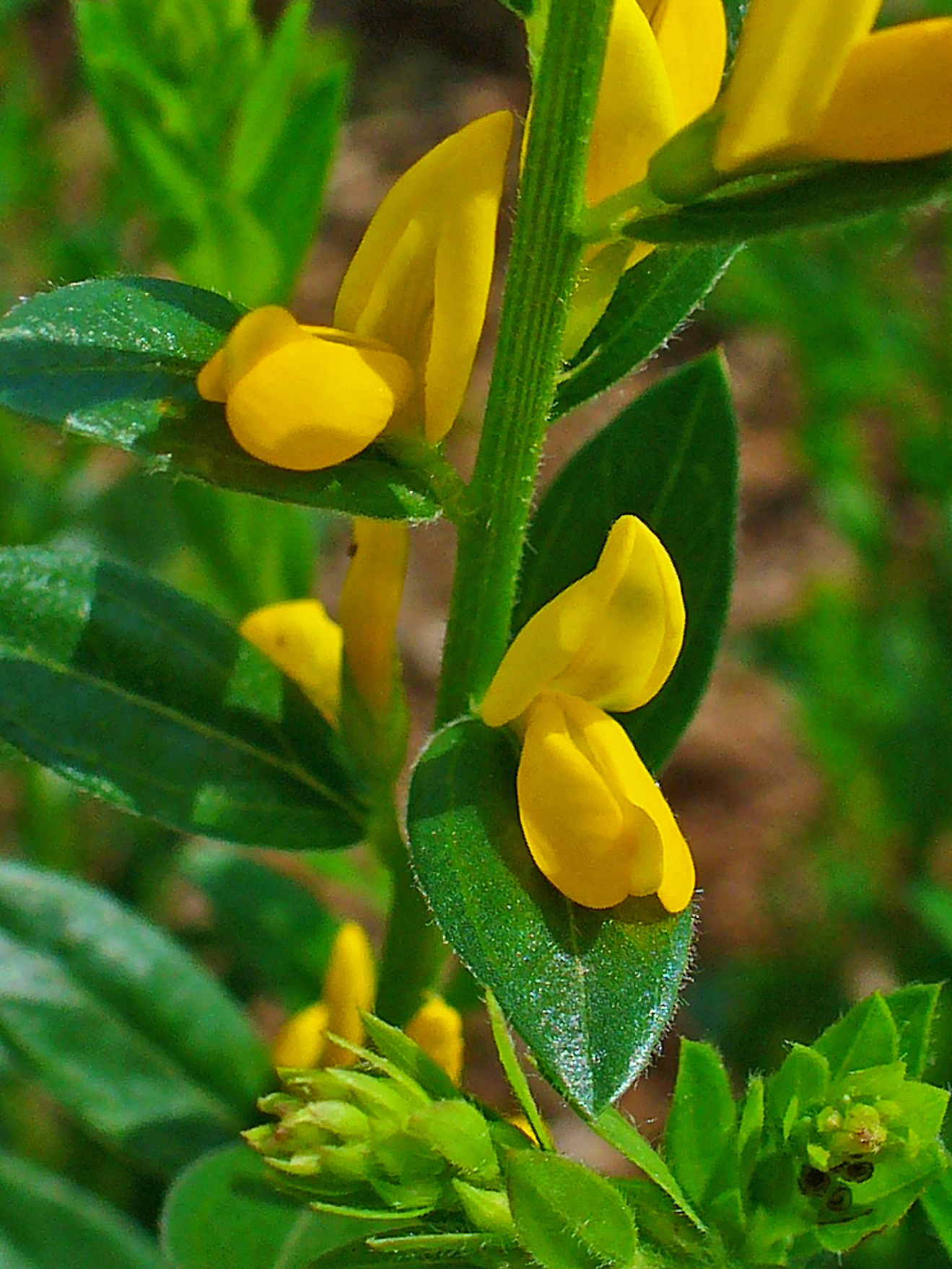
