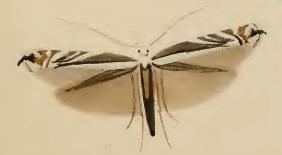

Scientific classification
- Kingdom: Animalia
- Phylum: Arthropoda
- Clade: Pancrustacea
- Class: Insecta
- Order: Lepidoptera
- Family: Gracillariidae
- Genus: Micrurapteryx
- Species: M. kollariella

Binomial name
- Micrurapteryx kollariella (Zeller, 1839)

Synonyms
- Gracilaria kollariella Zeller, 1839

= Micrurapteryx kollariella =

Species of moth

Micrurapteryx kollariella is a moth of the family Gracillariidae. It is known from all of Europe, except the British Islands and Fennoscandia.

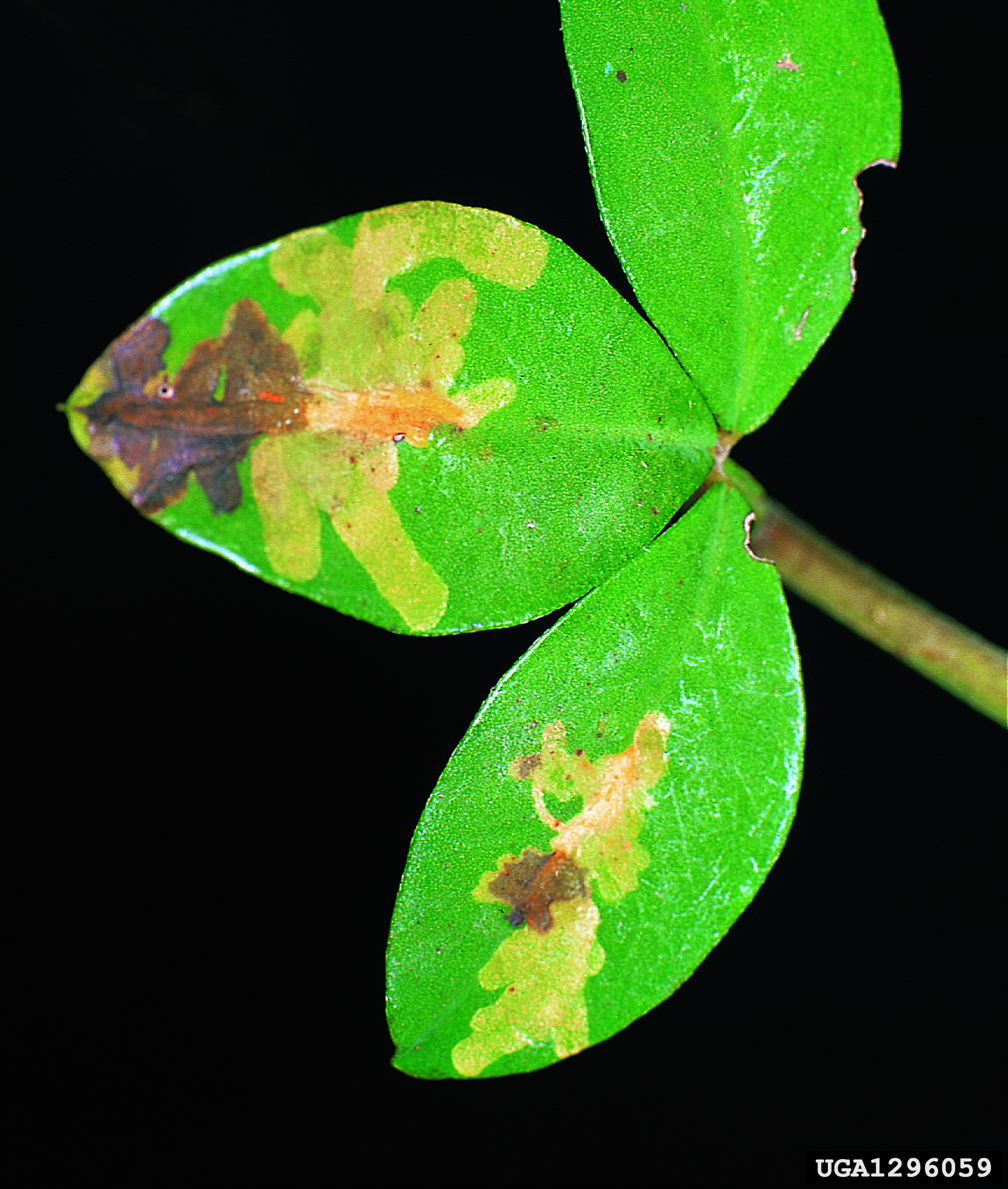
Damage

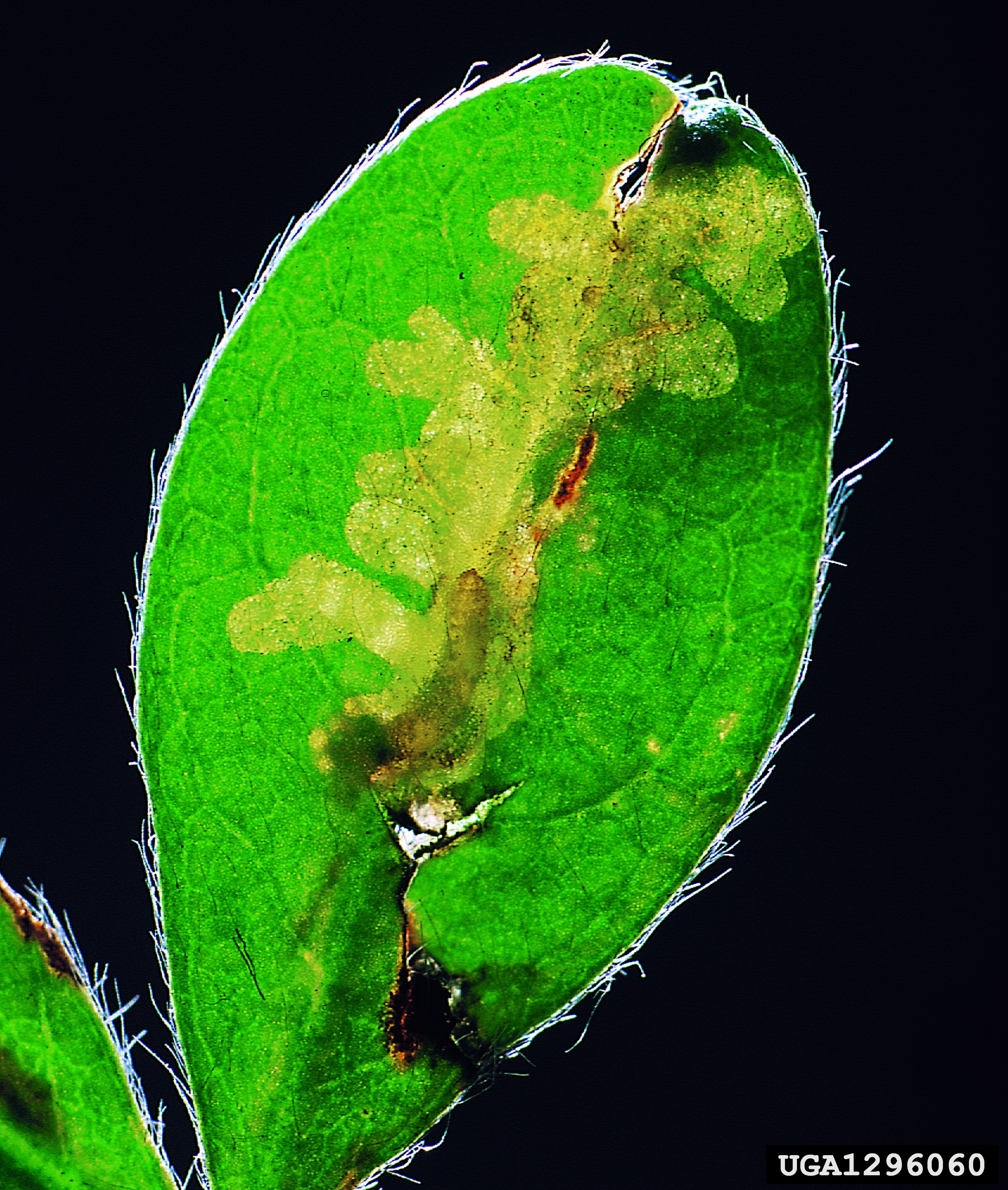
Damage

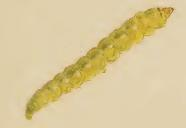
Larva

The larvae feed on Chamaecytisus hirsutus, Cytisus scoparius, Cytisus sessilifolius, Genista germanica, Genista sericea, Genista tinctoria, Laburnum anagyroides, Lembotropis nigricans, Lupinus and Petteria ramentacea. They mine the leaves of their host plant.
