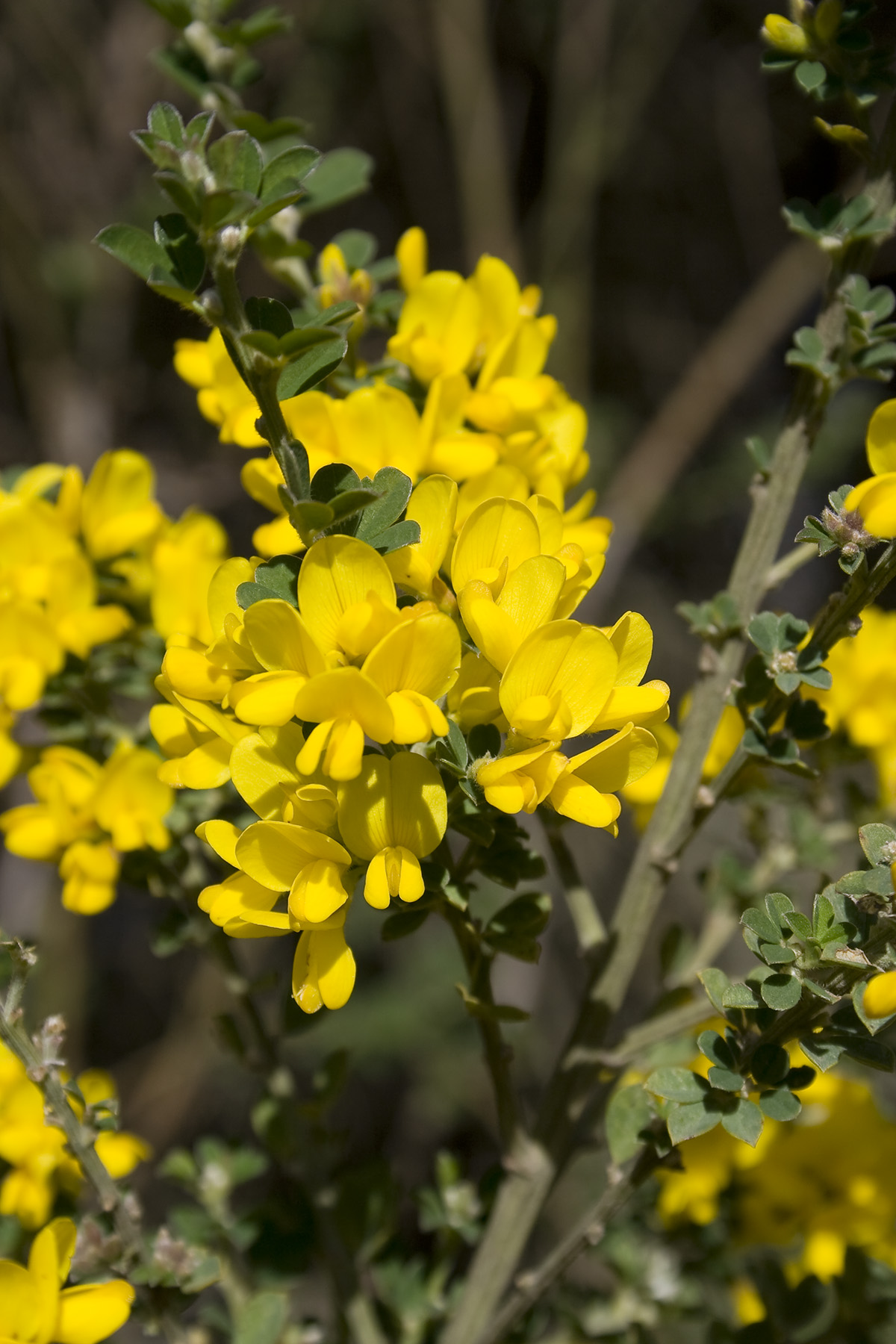
- French broom, Genista monspessulana

Scientific classification
- Kingdom: Plantae
- Clade: Tracheophytes
- Clade: Angiosperms
- Clade: Eudicots
- Clade: Rosids
- Order: Fabales
- Family: Fabaceae
- Subfamily: Faboideae
- Clade: Meso-Papilionoideae
- Clade: Genistoids
- Clade: Core Genistoids
- Tribe: Genisteae (Bronn) Dumort 1827

Genera
- Adenocarpus DC.; Anarthrophyllum Benth.; Argyrocytisus (Maire) Frodin & Heywood ex Raynaud; Argyrolobium Eckl. & Zeyh.; Calicotome Link (Note: Often treated as a section of Cytisus, rather than a segregate genus.); Chamaecytisus Link; Cytisophyllum O.Lang; Cytisus Desf.; Dichilus DC.; Echinospartum (Spach) Fourr. (Note: Often treated as a section of Genista, rather than a segregate genus.); Erinacea Adans.; Genista L.; Gonocytisus Spach; Hesperolaburnum Maire; +Laburnocytisus C.K.Schneid (Note: Not a true genus. It is a graft-chimera between Laburnum and Cytisus.); Laburnum Fabr.; Lembotropis Griseb.; Lupinus L.; Melolobium Eckl. & Zeyh.; Petteria C. Presl; Podocytisus Boiss. & Heldr.; Polhillia C.H.Stirt.; Retama Raf.; Sellocharis Taub.; Spartium L.; Stauracanthus Link; Ulex L.

Synonyms
- Cytiseae Horan. 1847; Laburneae (Rouy) Hutch. 1964; Lupineae (Rouy) Hutch. 1964; Genisteae subtribe Genistinae Bronn 1822; Uliceae Webb 1852

= Genisteae =

Tribe of legumes

Genisteae is a tribe of trees, shrubs and herbaceous plants in the subfamily Faboideae of the family Fabaceae. It includes a number of well-known plants including broom, lupine (lupin), gorse and laburnum.

The tribe's greatest diversity is in the Mediterranean, and most genera are native to Europe, Africa, the Canary Islands, India and southwest Asia. However, the largest genus, Lupinus, is most diverse in North and South America. Anarthrophytum and Sellocharis are also South American and Argyrolobium ranges into India.

== Description ==
The Genisteae arose 32.3 ± 2.9 million years ago (in the Oligocene). The members of this tribe consistently form a monophyletic clade in molecular phylogenetic analyses. The tribe does not currently have a node-based definition, but several morphological synapomorphies have been identified:

… bilabiate calyces with a bifid upper lip and a trifid lower lip, … the lack of an aril, or the presence of an aril but on the short side of the seed, and stamen filaments fused in a closed tube with markedly dimorphic anthers … and presence of α-pyridone alkaloids.

Most (and possibly all) genera in the tribe produce 5-O-methylgenistein. Many genera also accumulate quinolizidine alkaloids, ammodendrine-type dipiperidine alkaloids, and macrocyclic pyrrolizidine alkaloids.

== Name ==
Old English bróm is from a common West Germanic *bráma- (Old High German brâmo, "bramble"), from a Germanic stem bræ̂m- from Proto-Indo-European *bh(e)rem- "to project; a point", with an original sense of "thorny shrub" or similar. Use of the branches of these plants for sweeping gave rise to the term broom for sweeping tools in the 15th century, gradually replacing Old English besema (which survives as dialectal or archaic besom).

Linnaean genista from Latin "broom", from Greek genistē from genistos "to produce", presumably in reference to the prolific reproduction of broom plants.

== Cultivation ==
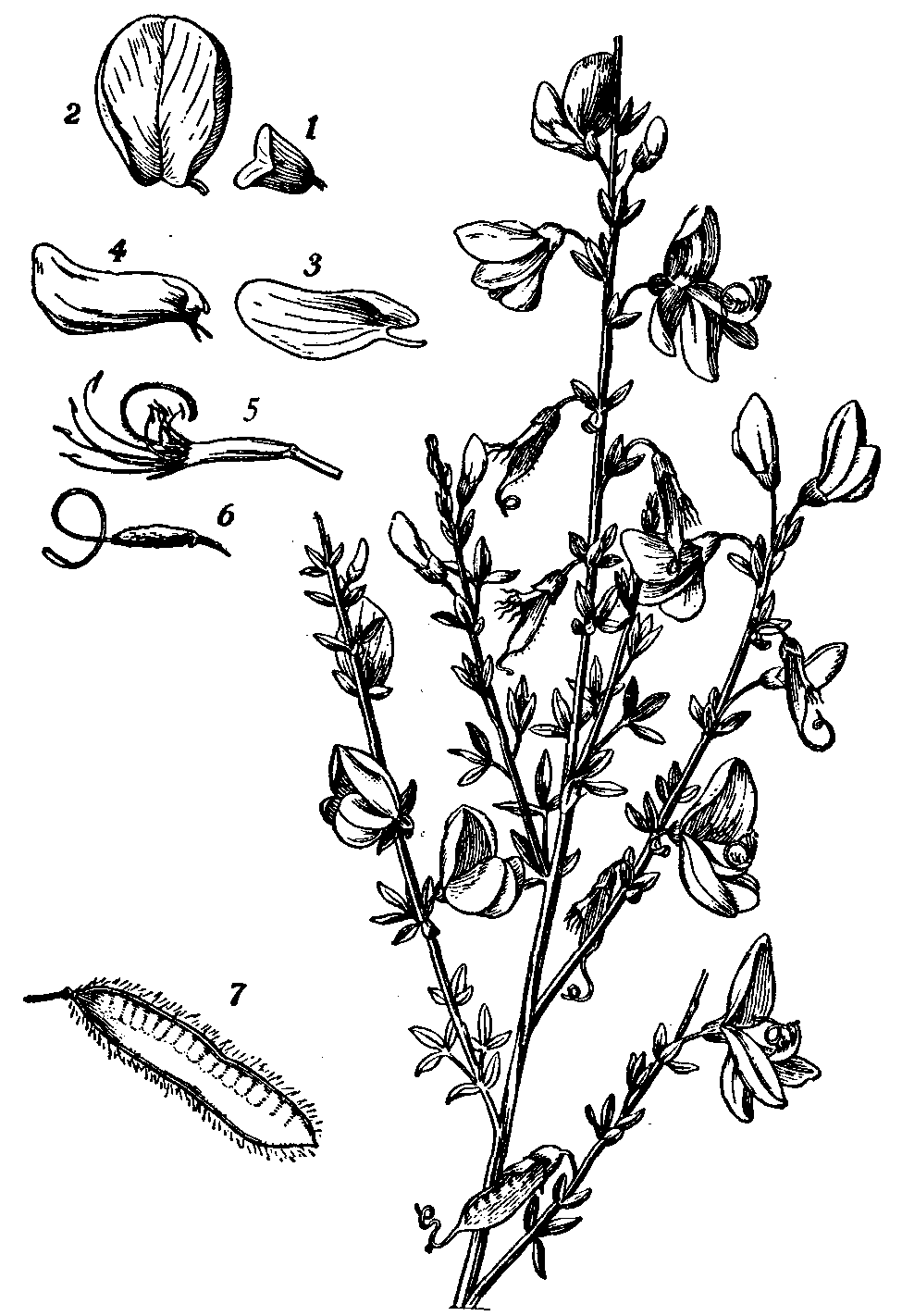
Cytisus scoparius, Common Broom. 1. Two-lipped calyx. 2. Broadly ovate vexillum or standard. 3. One of the alae or wings of the corolla. 4. Carina or keel. 5. Monadelphous stamens. 6. Hairy ovary with the long style, thickened upwards, and spirally curved. 7. Legume or pod.

Brooms tolerate (and often thrive best in) poor soils and growing conditions. In cultivation they need little care, though they need good drainage and perform poorly on wet soils.

They are widely used as ornamental landscape plants and also for wasteland reclamation (e.g. mine tailings) and sand dune stabilising.

Tagasaste (Chamaecytisus proliferus), a Canary Islands native, is widely grown as sheep fodder.

Species of broom popular in horticulture are purple broom (Chamaecytisus purpureus; purple flowers), Atlas broom (or Moroccan broom) (Argyrocytisus battandieri, with silvery foliage), dwarf broom (Cytisus procumbens), Provence broom (Cytisus purgans) and Spanish broom (Spartium junceum).

Many of the most popular brooms in gardens are hybrids, notably Kew broom (Cytisus × kewensis, hybrid between C. ardoinii and C. multiflorus) and Warminster broom (Cytisus × praecox, hybrid between C. oromediterraneus and C. multiflorus).

=== Invasive species ===
On the east and west coasts of North America, common broom (Cytisus scoparius) was introduced as an ornamental plant (e.g.:California since the 1860s). It is known in much of the Pacific Northwest as Scotch broom. It has become a naturalised invasive weed, and due to its aggressive seed dispersal broom removal has proved very difficult. Similarly, it is a major problem species in the cooler and wetter areas of southern Australia and New Zealand. Biological control for broom in New Zealand has been investigated since the mid-1980s. On the west coast of the United States, French broom (Genista monspessulana), Mediterranean broom (Genista linifolia) and Spanish broom (Spartium junceum) are also considered noxious invasives, as broom quickly crowds out native vegetation, and grow most prolifically in the least accessible areas.

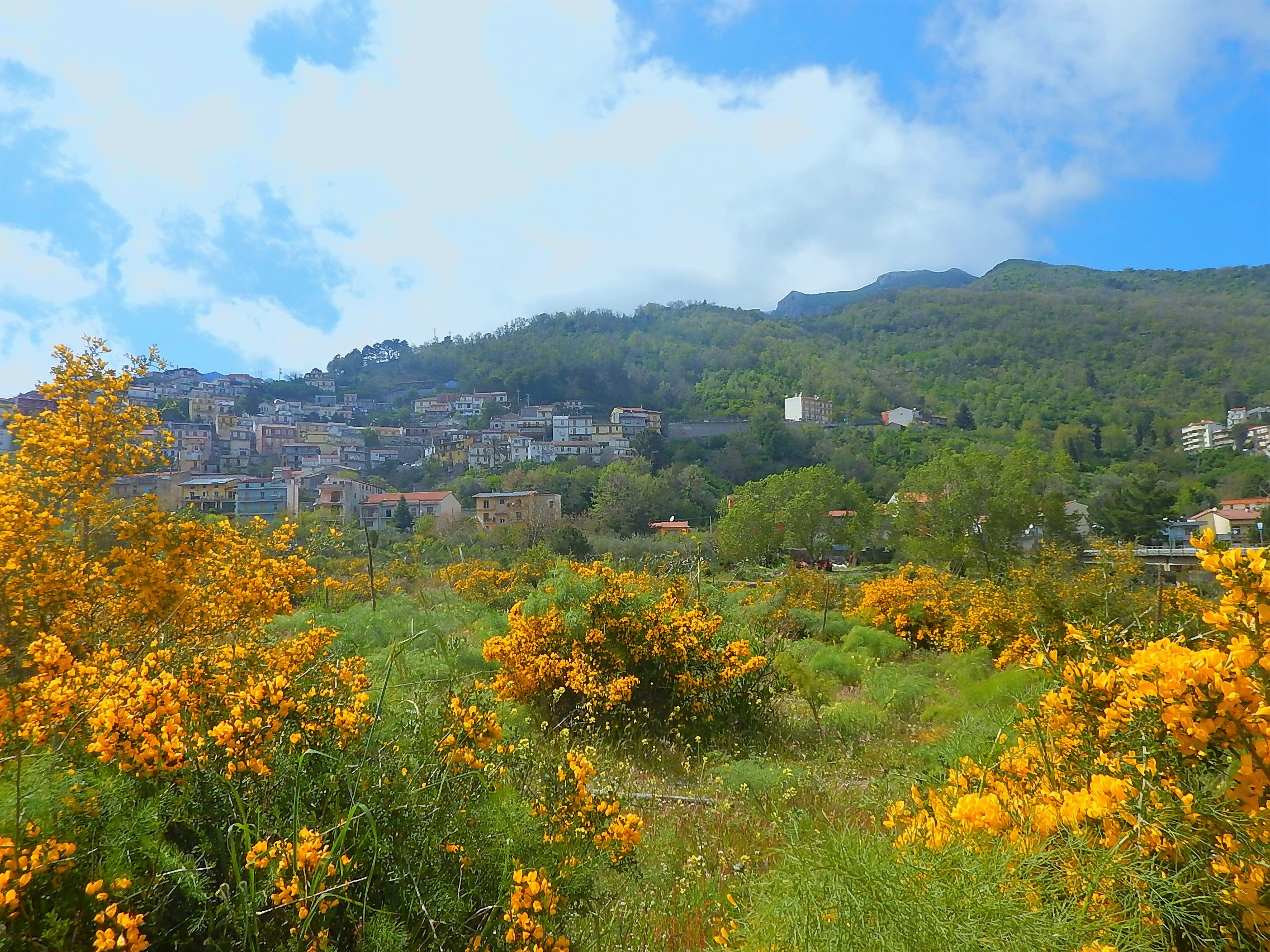
brooms in spring at Fondachelli-Fantina, Sicily

== Historical uses ==
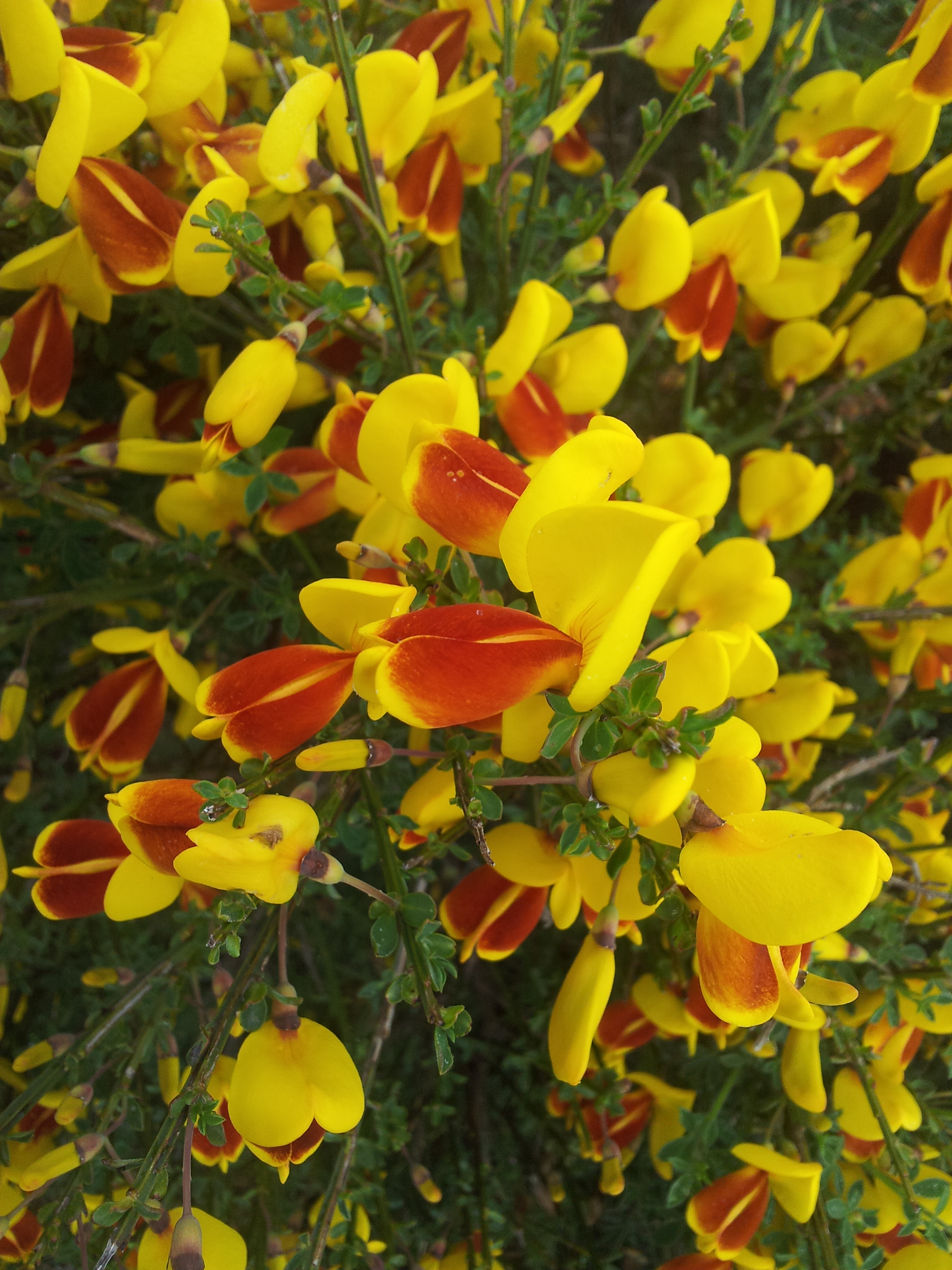
Broom (plant)

The Plantagenet kings used common broom (known as planta genista in Latin) as an emblem and took their name from it. It was originally the emblem of Geoffrey of Anjou, father of Henry II of England. Wild broom is still common in dry habitats around Anjou, France.

Charles V and his son Charles VI of France used the pod of the broom plant (broom-cod, or cosse de geneste) as an emblem for livery collars and badges.

Genista tinctoria (dyer's broom, also known as dyer's greenweed or dyer's greenwood), provides a useful yellow dye and was grown commercially for this purpose in parts of Britain into the early 19th century. Woollen cloth, mordanted with alum, was dyed yellow with dyer's greenweed, then dipped into a vat of blue dye (woad or, later, indigo) to produce the once-famous "Kendal Green" (largely superseded by the brighter "Saxon Green" in the 1770s). Kendal green is a local common name for the plant.

The flower buds and flowers of Cytisus scoparius have been used as a salad ingredient, raw or pickled, and were a popular ingredient for salmagundi or "grand sallet" during the 17th and 18th century. There are now concerns about the toxicity of broom, with potential effects on the heart and problems during pregnancy.

Scotch Broom is the Plant Badge of Clan Forbes.

== See also ==
- Order of the Broom-cod
- Cytisus scoparius "Scotch Broom"
