= Coleophora tanyleuca =

Scientific classification
- Kingdom: Animalia
- Phylum: Arthropoda
- Class: Insecta
- Order: Lepidoptera
- Family: Coleophoridae
- Genus: Coleophora
- Species: C. tanyleuca

Binomial name
- Coleophora tanyleuca (Meyrick, 1936)

Synonyms
- Enscepastra tanyleuca Meyrick, 1936; Coleophora mauretanica Toll, 1952

Species of moth

Coleophora tanyleuca is a moth of the family Coleophoridae. It is found in Mauritania and Tunisia. The larvae feed on the leaves of Cytisus sessilifolius.
