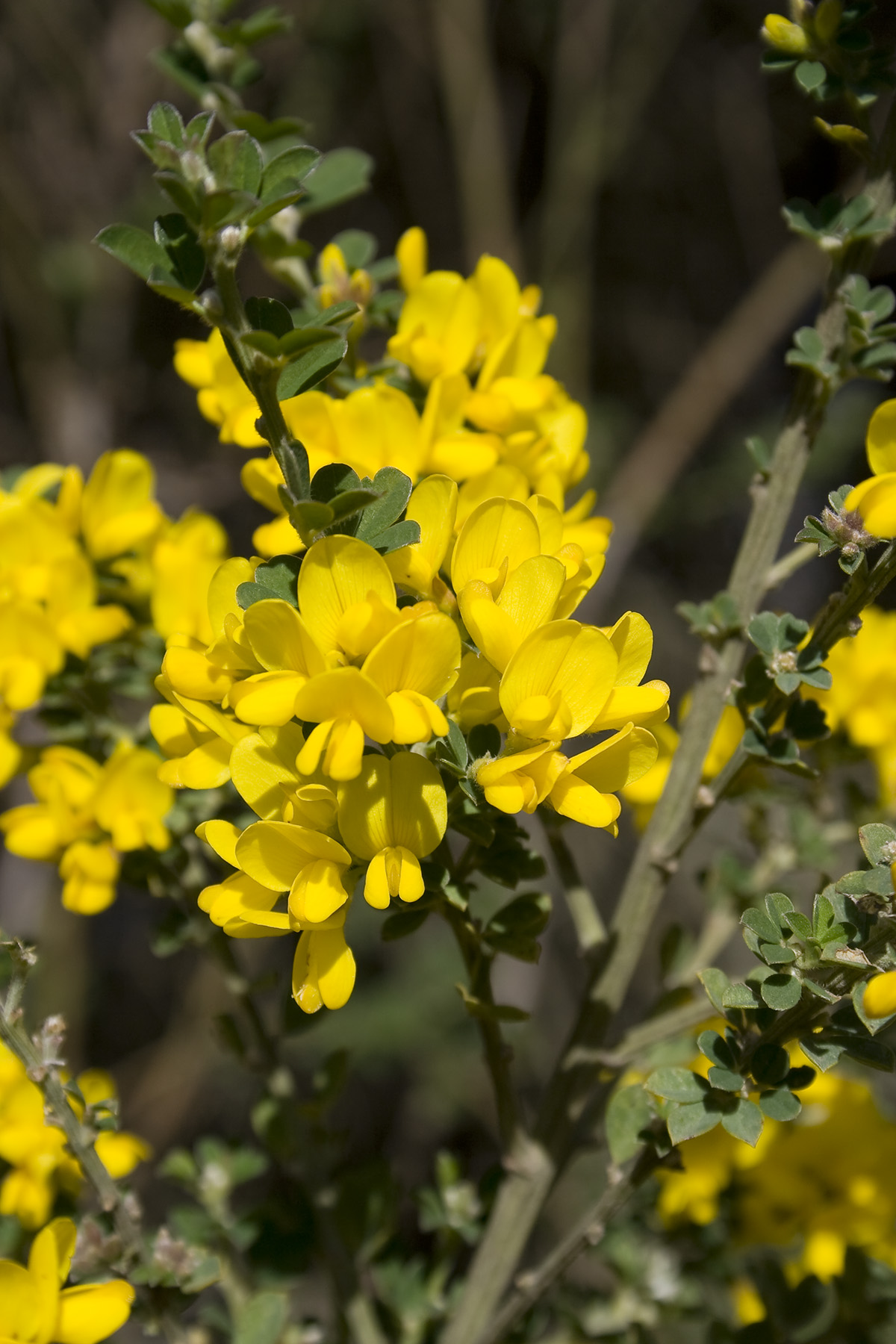
- French broom

Scientific classification
- Kingdom: Plantae
- Clade: Tracheophytes
- Clade: Angiosperms
- Clade: Eudicots
- Clade: Rosids
- Order: Fabales
- Family: Fabaceae
- Subfamily: Faboideae
- Genus: Genista
- Species: G. monspessulana

Binomial name
- Genista monspessulana (L.) L.A.S.Johnson 1962

Synonyms
- Avornela candicans (L.) Raf. 1838; Cytisus candicans (L.) DC. 1805; Cytisus candicans (L.) Lam.1786; Cytisus candicans var. colmeiroi Willk. 1847; Cytisus candicans var. colmeiroi (Kunze) Ceballos & C.Vicioso 1933; Cytisus candicans var. kunzeanus (Willk.) Pérez Lara 1892; Cytisus canescens Janka 1884; Cytisus kunzeanus Willk. 1877; Cytisus monspessulanus L. 1753; Cytisus monspessulanus var. kunzeanus (Willk.) Briq. 1894; Cytisus monspessulanus var. syriacus (Boiss. & Blanche) Briq. 1894; Cytisus pubescens Moench 1802; Cytisus syriacus Boiss. & C.I.Blanche 1872; Cytisus syriacus (Boiss. & C.I.Blanche) Boiss. 1872; Genista candicans L. 1755; Genista candicans var. colmeiroi colmeiroi (Wilk.) Rouy 1897; Genista candicans var. eriocarpa (Kunze) Pau 1922; Genista ephedroides sensu H.J.Coste 1901; Genista eriocarpa Kunze 1846; Genista monspessulana (L.) O.Bolós & Vigo 1974, nom. illeg.; Genista monspessulana var. colmeiroi (Willk.) Briq. 1894; Genista monspessulana var. colmeiroi (Willk.) O.Bolòs & Vigo 1974, nom. illeg.; Genista syriaca Boiss. & C.I.Blanche 1856; Telinaria candicans (L.) C.Presl 1845; Teline candicans (L.) Medik. 1789; Teline eriocarpa (Kunze) K.Koch 1853; Teline medicaginoides Medik. 1786; Teline monspessulana (L.) K.Koch 1869; Teline monospessulana [sic] (L.) K.Koch 1869

= Genista monspessulana =

Species of flowering plant

Genista monspessulana, commonly known as French broom, Montpellier broom, or Cape broom (Australia), is a woody leguminous perennial shrub. The yellow-flowering bush is native to the Mediterranean region, and while it may still be commonly sold in some garden stores, it is considered an invasive plant in most places where it has been introduced. It is a noxious weed on the western coast of the US and in parts of Australia.

== Description ==
G. monspessulana grows to 1–2.5 metres (3 1/2–8 feet) tall, with slender green branches. Stems generally ridged or angled and green when young. The leaves are evergreen, trifoliate with three narrow obovate leaflets, 1–2 centimetres (1/2–3/4 inch) long. The flowers are yellow, grouped 3–9 together in short racemes. Like other legumes, it develops its seeds within a pod. The pods are 2–3 cm (3/4–1 1/4 in) long, tough and hard, covered all over with hairs, and are transported easily by flowing water and animals. They burst open with force, dispersing the seeds several metres. The plant begins seed production once it reaches a height of approximately 40 cm (16 in), and each plant can live for 10–20 years. One mature plant can produce 10,000 seeds per season. The generous seed production and the plant's ability to re-sprout after cutting or burning help it to invade new habitat vigorously when introduced.

It is related to the common broom and Spanish broom.

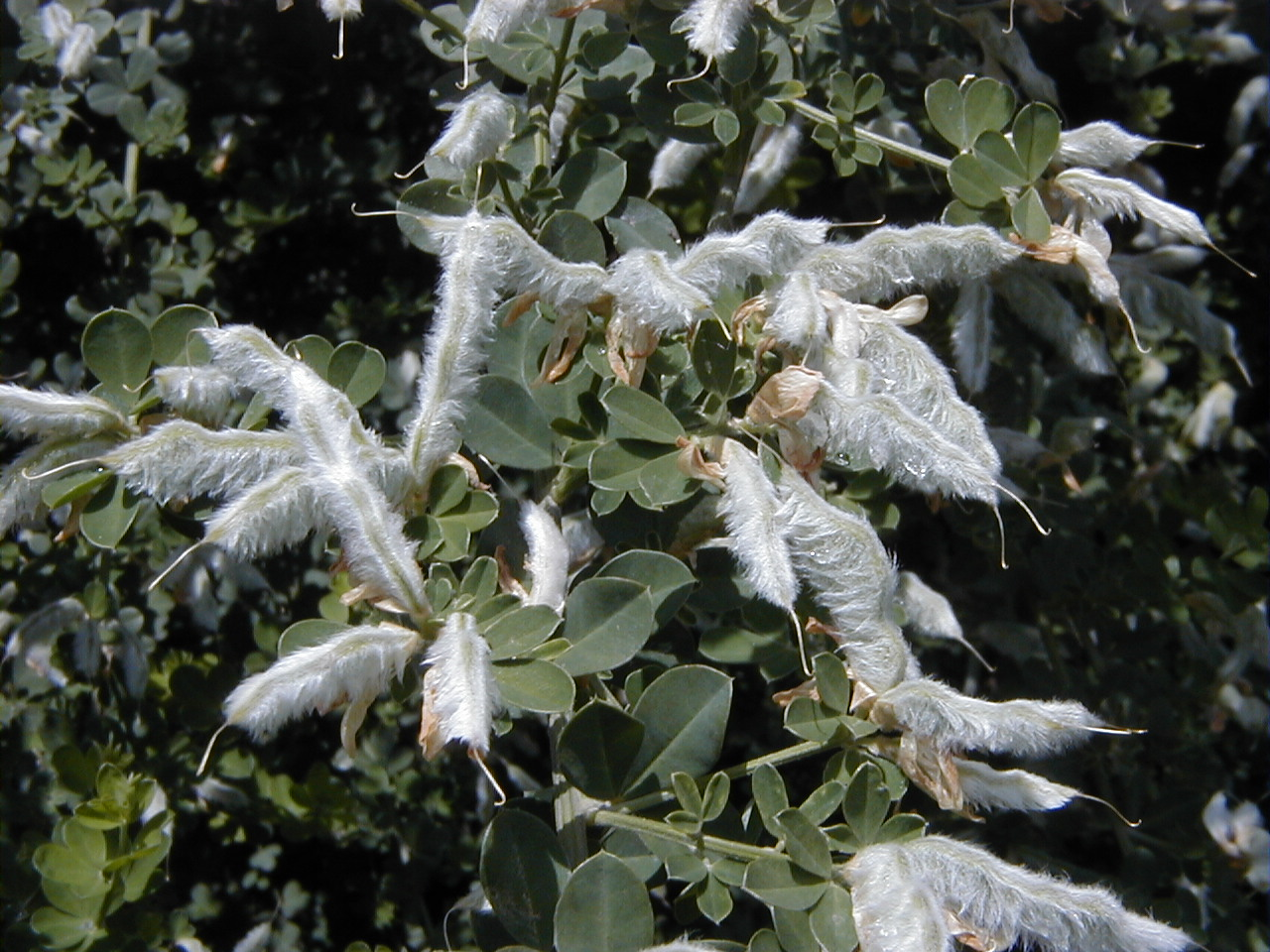
Seedpods

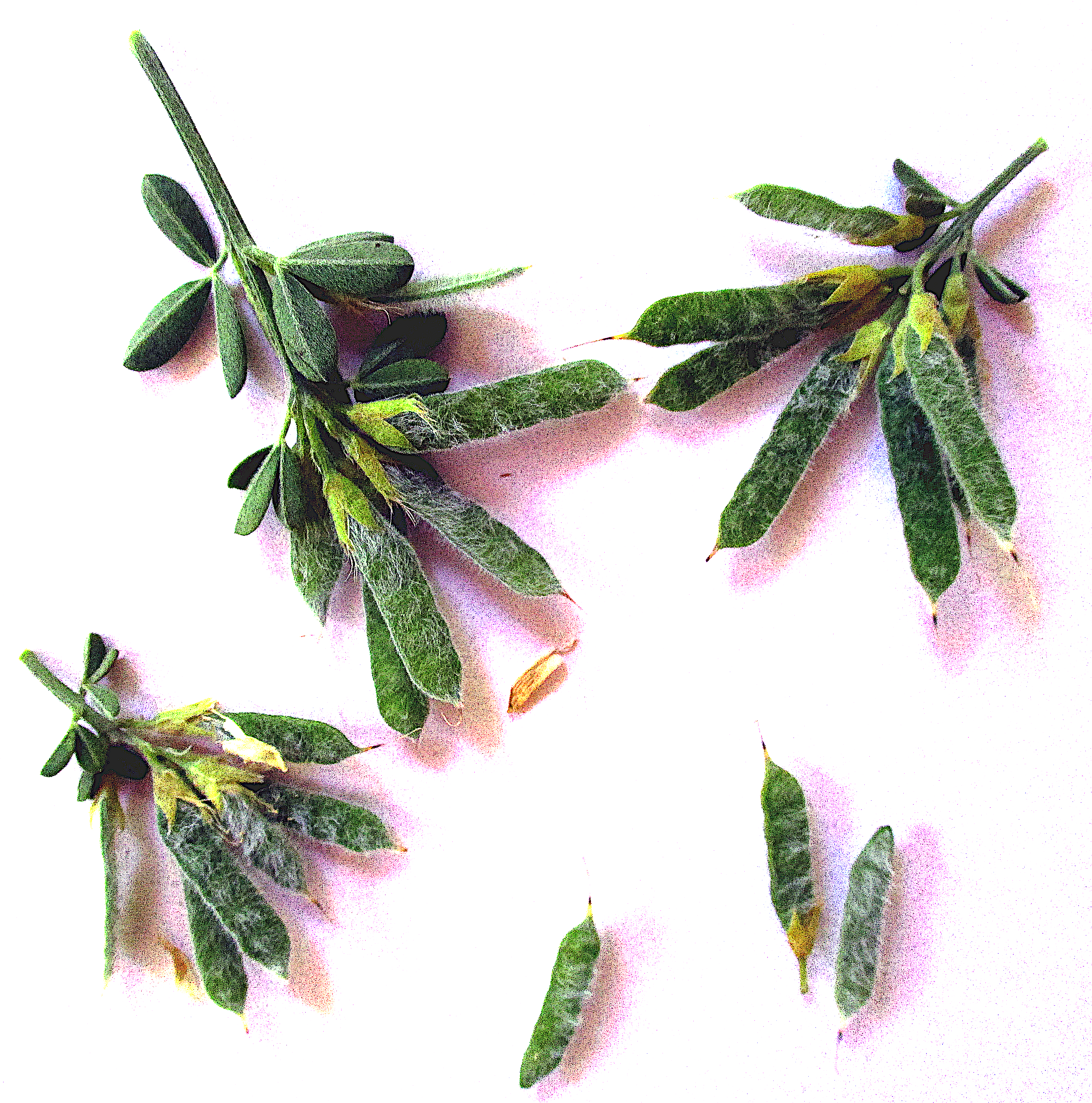
Immature seedpods at the start of April

== Distribution and habitat ==
G. monspessulana and related plants are common in European shrublands. French broom was originally distributed throughout Mediterranean Europe and northwest Africa, the Azores, and the Canary Islands. Due to its lower tolerance for frost than other broom species, it is common in warmer, lower elevation areas. It is found on coastal strips and in sunny inland areas, and does best with plentiful rainfall and sandy soils.

== Ecology ==
When introduced to a new area, French broom can become an invasive plant. Its reproductive vigour and preference for Mediterranean climates make it a very successful species in California and the Pacific Northwest, where it is considered a severe noxious weed, covering over 40 kilohectares. It is even more widespread in Australia, where it covers 600 kilohectares and is also considered a noxious weed.

The plant often outcompetes native vegetation, forming dense fields where other species are almost completely crowded out. Stands of French broom can be so thick that they make meadows and pastures useless for wild and domestic animals. It can also shade out tree seedlings in reforested areas and tends to catch fire.

== Toxicity ==
The leaves and seeds contain alkaloids which are poisonous to many large domestic animals.

== See also ==
- Broom (shrub)
