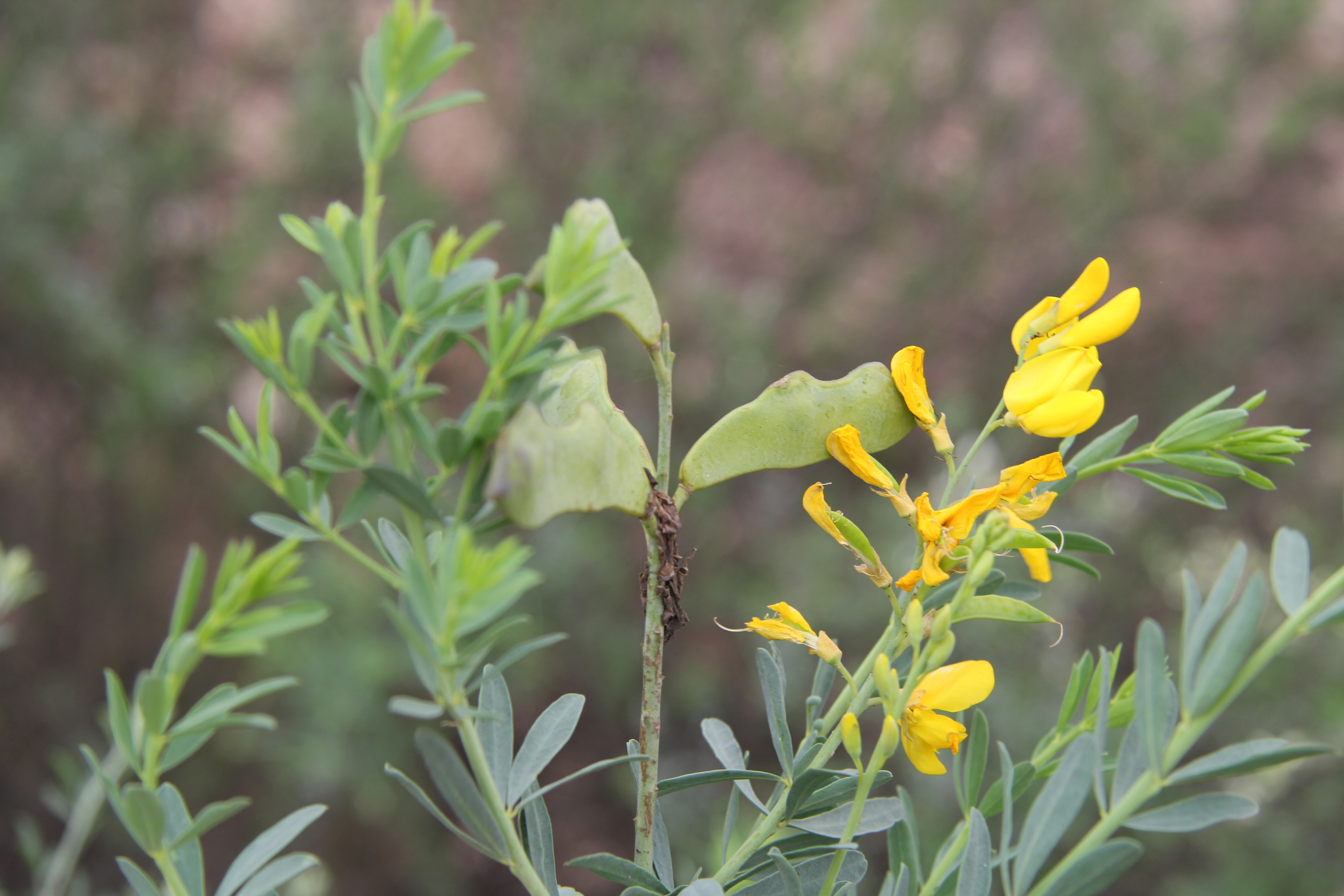

Scientific classification
- Kingdom: Plantae
- Clade: Tracheophytes
- Clade: Angiosperms
- Clade: Eudicots
- Clade: Rosids
- Order: Fabales
- Family: Fabaceae
- Subfamily: Faboideae
- Tribe: Genisteae
- Genus: Hesperolaburnum; Maire (1949)
- Species: H. platycarpum

Binomial name
- Hesperolaburnum platycarpum (Maire) Maire (1949)

Synonyms
- Cytisus platycarpus (Maire) Rothm. (1944); Laburnum platycarpum Maire (1921)

= Hesperolaburnum =

Genus of legumes

Hesperolaburnum platycarpum is a species of flowering plants in the family Fabaceae. It belongs to the subfamily Faboideae. It is the only member of the genus Hesperolaburnum. It is a tree or shrub endemic to Morocco.
