= Sellocharis =

Scientific classification
- Kingdom: Plantae
- Clade: Tracheophytes
- Clade: Angiosperms
- Clade: Eudicots
- Clade: Rosids
- Order: Fabales
- Family: Fabaceae
- Subfamily: Faboideae
- Tribe: Genisteae
- Genus: Sellocharis; Taub. (1889)
- Species: S. paradoxa

Binomial name
- Sellocharis paradoxa Taub. (1893)

Genus of legumes

Sellocharis paradoxa is a species of flowering plants in the family Fabaceae. It belongs to the subfamily Faboideae. It is native to southern Brazil and is the only member of the genus Sellocharis.
