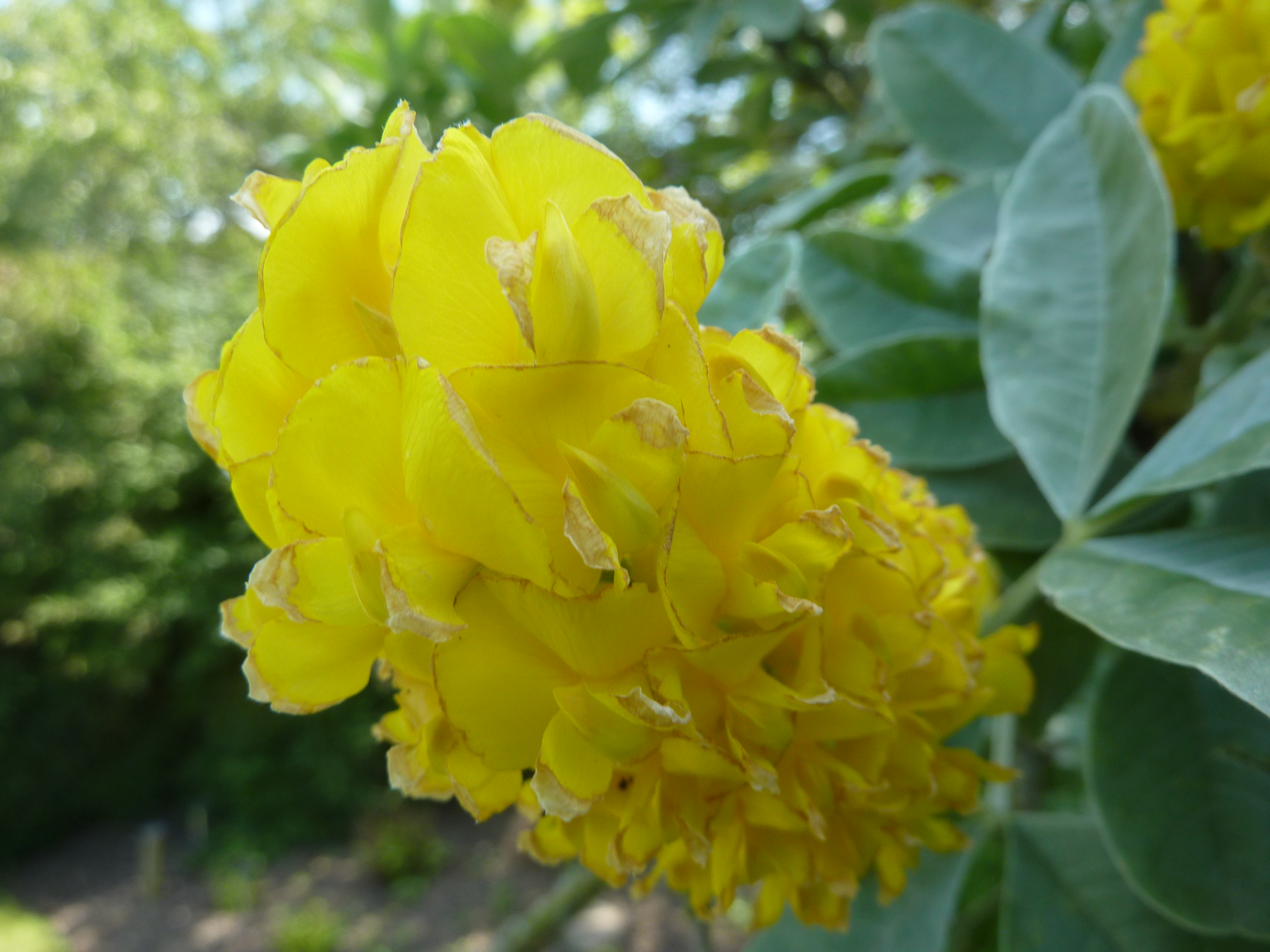
- Cambridge University Botanic Garden

Scientific classification
- Kingdom: Plantae
- Clade: Tracheophytes
- Clade: Angiosperms
- Clade: Eudicots
- Clade: Rosids
- Order: Fabales
- Family: Fabaceae
- Subfamily: Faboideae
- Tribe: Genisteae
- Genus: Argyrocytisus (Maire) Raynaud (1974 publ. 1975)
- Species: A. battandieri

Binomial name
- Argyrocytisus battandieri (Maire) J.Raynal (1974 publ. 1975)

Synonyms
- Adenocarpus battandieri (Maire) Talavera (1999); Cytisus battandieri Maire (1915)

= Argyrocytisus =

Genus of legumes

Argyrocytisus battandieri, the pineapple broom or Moroccan broom is a species of flowering plant in the legume family, Fabaceae, subfamily Faboideae. It is the only member of the genus Argyrocytisus (formerly Cytisus battandieri).

It is native to the Rif and Middle Atlas mountains of Morocco. It is a substantial deciduous shrub growing to 4 metres (13 ft) tall and wide, with trifoliate grey-green leaves, and erect racemes of yellow flowers with a distinctive pineapple scent. Grown in a sheltered location, it is hardy down to −15 °C (5 °F).

The cultivar 'Yellow Tail' has gained the Royal Horticultural Society's Award of Garden Merit. It was introduced to the UK as recently as 1922, and for a long time was thought less hardy than plants have proved.
