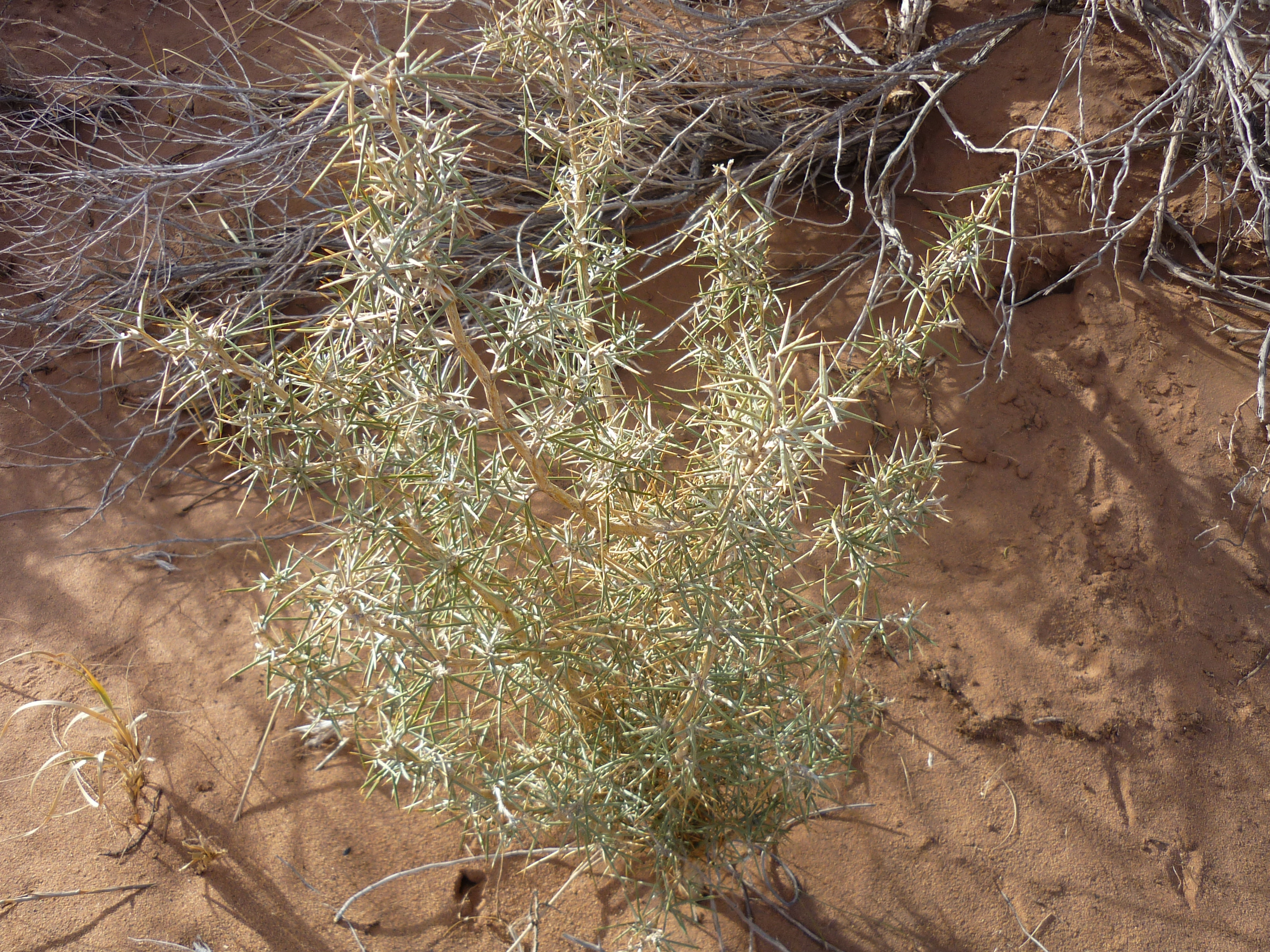
- Anarthrophyllum macrophyllum

Scientific classification
- Kingdom: Plantae
- Clade: Tracheophytes
- Clade: Angiosperms
- Clade: Eudicots
- Clade: Rosids
- Order: Fabales
- Family: Fabaceae
- Subfamily: Faboideae
- Tribe: Genisteae
- Genus: Anarthrophyllum; Benth.

Species
- 15–24; see text.

= Anarthrophyllum =

Genus of legumes

Anarthrophyllum is a genus of flowering plants in the family Fabaceae. It belongs to the subfamily Faboideae.

== Species ==
Anarthrophyllum comprises the following species:

- Anarthrophyllum andicolum (Hook. & Arn.) F. Phil.
- Anarthrophyllum burkartii Soraru
- Anarthrophyllum capitatum Soraru
- Anarthrophyllum catamarcense Soraru
- Anarthrophyllum cumingii (Hook. & Arn.) F. Phil.
- Anarthrophyllum desideratum (DC.) Benth.
- Anarthrophyllum elegans (Hook. & Arn.) F. Phil.
- Anarthrophyllum gayanum (A. Gray) B.D. Jacks.
- Anarthrophyllum macrophyllum Soraru
- Anarthrophyllum ornithopodum Sandwith
- Anarthrophyllum patagonicum Speg.
- Anarthrophyllum pedicellatum Soraru
- Anarthrophyllum rigidum (Hook. & Arn.) Hieron.
- Anarthrophyllum strigulipetalum Soraru
- Anarthrophyllum subandinum Speg.

== Species names with uncertain taxonomic status ==
The status of the following species is unresolved:

- Anarthrophyllum burkartii Sorarú
- Anarthrophyllum capitatum Sorarú
- Anarthrophyllum catamarcense Sorarú
- Anarthrophyllum cumingii (Hook. & Arn.) Phil.
- Anarthrophyllum desideratum (DC.) Reiche
- Anarthrophyllum elegans (Gillies ex Hook. & Arn.) Phil.
- Anarthrophyllum macrophyllum Sorarú
- Anarthrophyllum pedicellatum Sorarú
- Anarthrophyllum strigulipetalum Sorarú
