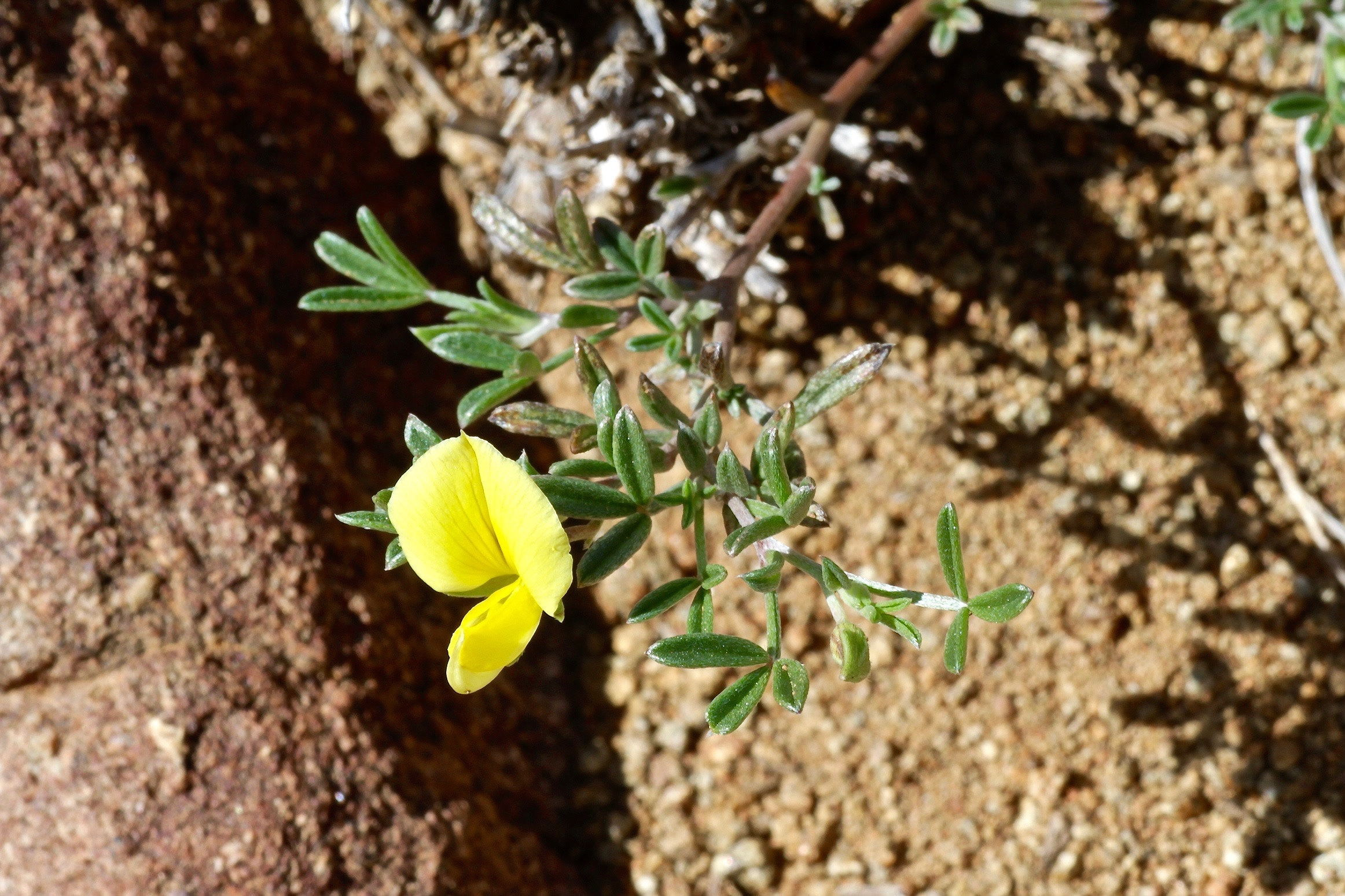
- Dichilus gracilis

Scientific classification
- Kingdom: Plantae
- Clade: Tracheophytes
- Clade: Angiosperms
- Clade: Eudicots
- Clade: Rosids
- Order: Fabales
- Family: Fabaceae
- Subfamily: Faboideae
- Tribe: Genisteae
- Genus: Dichilus; DC. (1826)

Species
- 5; see text

Synonyms
- Melinospermum Walp. (1840)

= Dichilus =

Genus of legumes

Dichilus is a genus of flowering plants in the family Fabaceae. It belongs to the subfamily Faboideae. It includes five species native to southern Africa, from Mozambique, Zimbabwe, and Namibia to South Africa.

== Species ==
Five species are accepted:

- Dichilus gracilis Eckl. & Zeyh.
- Dichilus lebeckioides DC.
- Dichilus pilosus Conrath ex Schinz
- Dichilus reflexus (N.E.Br.) A.L.Schutte
- Dichilus strictus E.Mey.
