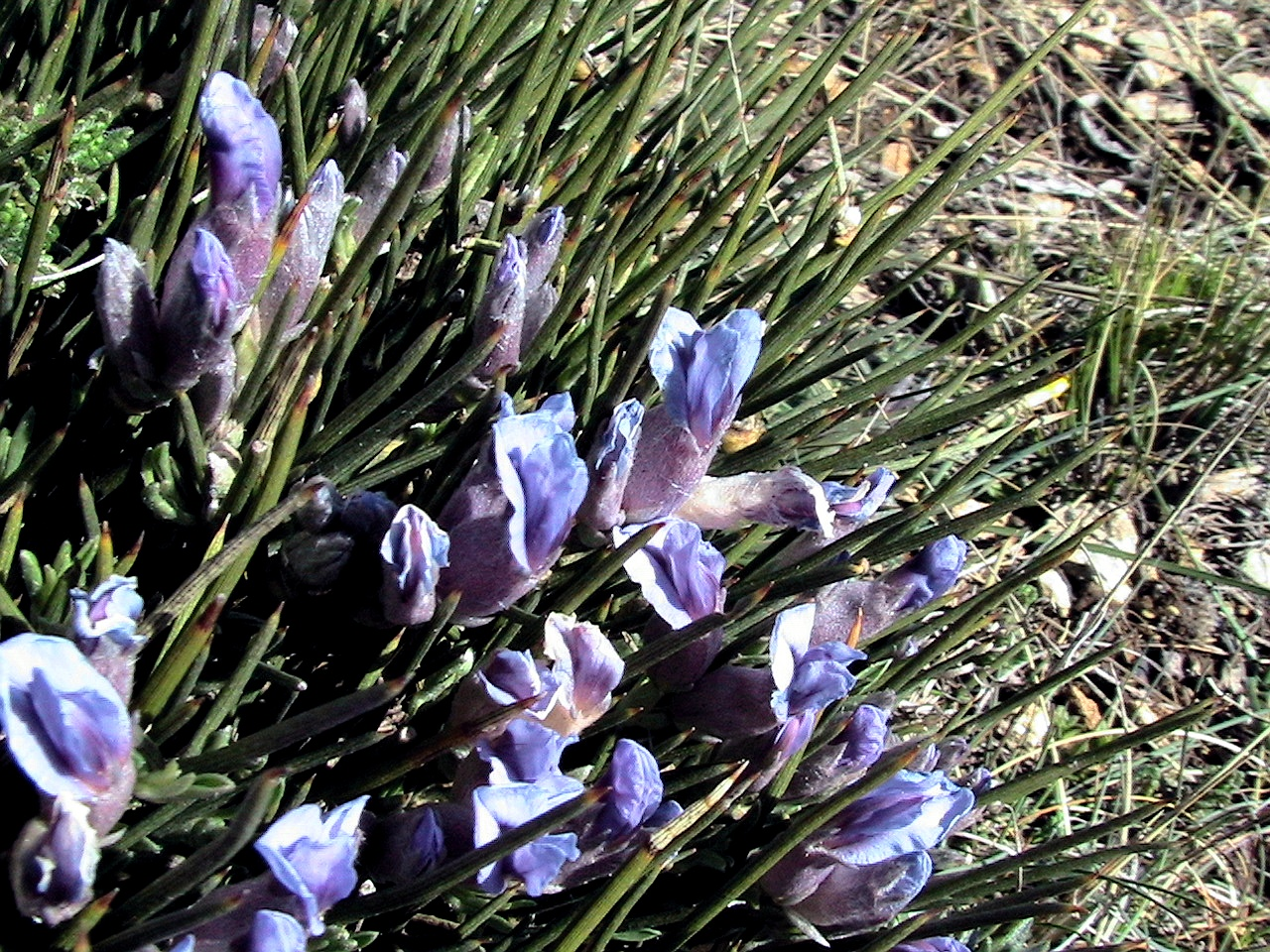

Scientific classification
- Kingdom: Plantae
- Clade: Tracheophytes
- Clade: Angiosperms
- Clade: Eudicots
- Clade: Rosids
- Order: Fabales
- Family: Fabaceae
- Subfamily: Faboideae
- Tribe: Genisteae
- Genus: Erinacea; Tourn. ex Adans. (1793)
- Species: E. anthyllis

Binomial name
- Erinacea anthyllis Link (1831)

Subspecies
- Erinacea anthyllis subsp. anthyllis; Erinacea anthyllis subsp. schoenenbergeri Raynaud

Synonyms
- Anthyllis erinacea L. (1753); Erinacea erinacea (L.) Asch. & Graebn. (1907), not validly publ.; Erinacea pungens Boiss. (1840), nom. superfl.

= Erinacea =

Species of flowering plant

Erinacea anthyllis, the blue broom, hedgehog plant, or rushy kidney vetch, is a species of flowering plant in the family Fabaceae. The sole species in genus Erinacea, it is native to stony mountainous places in the western Mediterranean, including the Pyrenees of France and Spain and Morocco, Algeria, and Tunisia. It is a dwarf, spiny, evergreen shrub growing to a dome shape 30 cm (12 in) tall and wide. It has dense foliage, and lilac coloured pea-like flowers in late spring and early summer.

The Latin specific epithet anthyllis highlights the plant's similarity to the related kidney vetch, Anthyllis vulneraria.

== Cultivation ==
Erinacea anthyllis is cultivated as an ornamental plant. It is best grown in sun, in sharply-drained alkaline soil which reproduces the limestone of its native habitat. Once established, it is extremely long-lived.

== Gallery ==
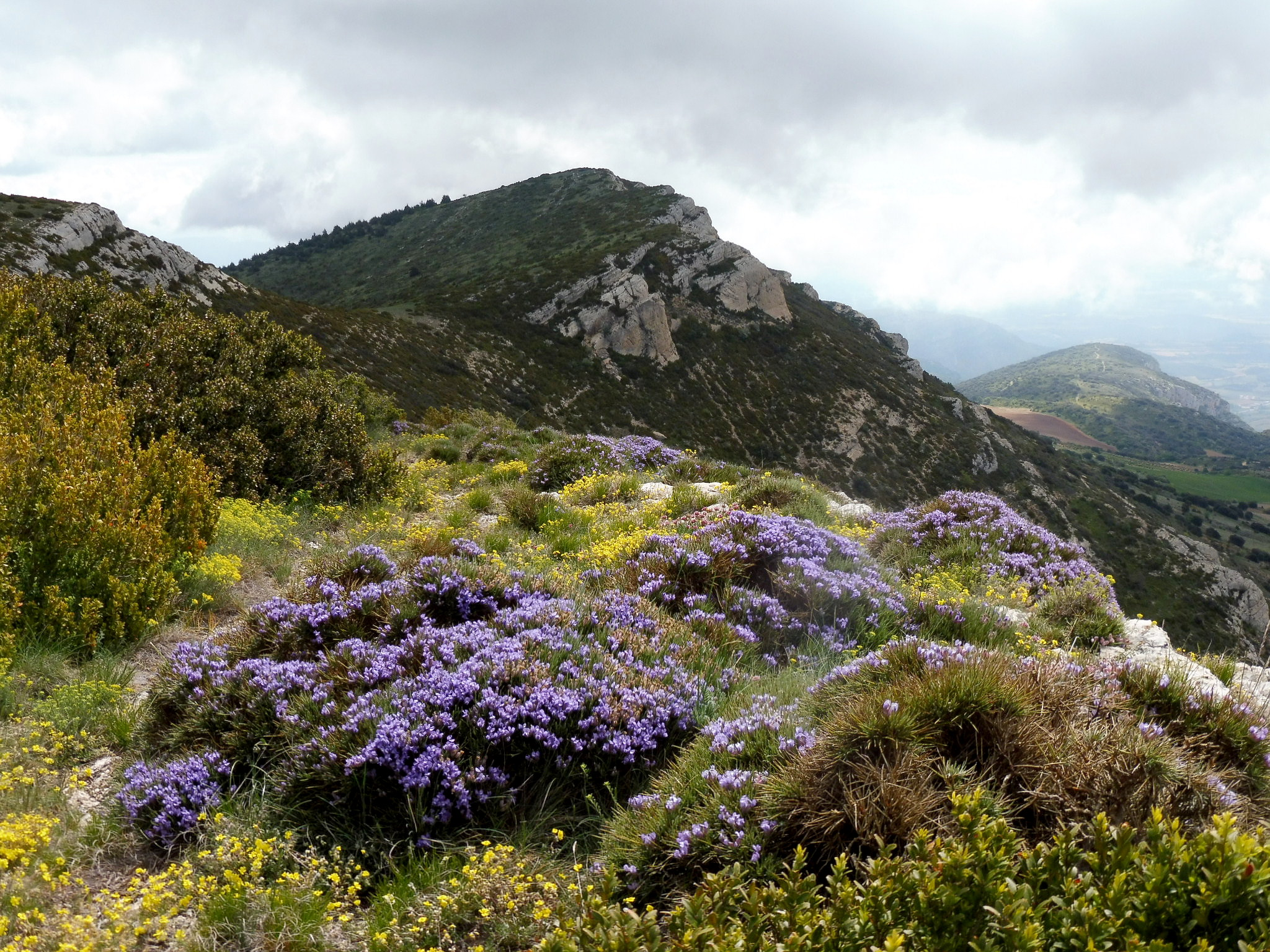
Montsec de Rúbies, foothills of the Pyrenees

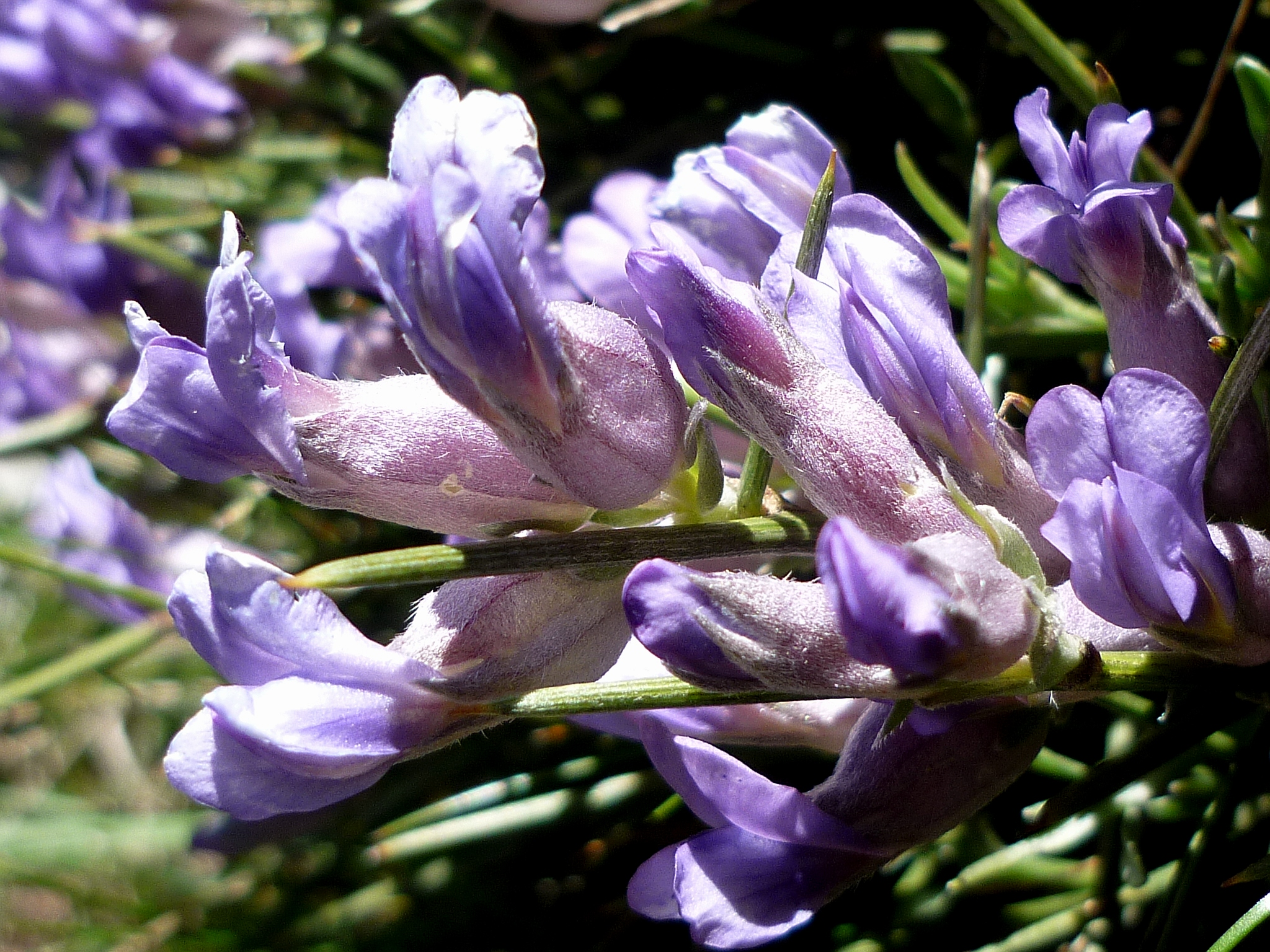
Close-up of flowers

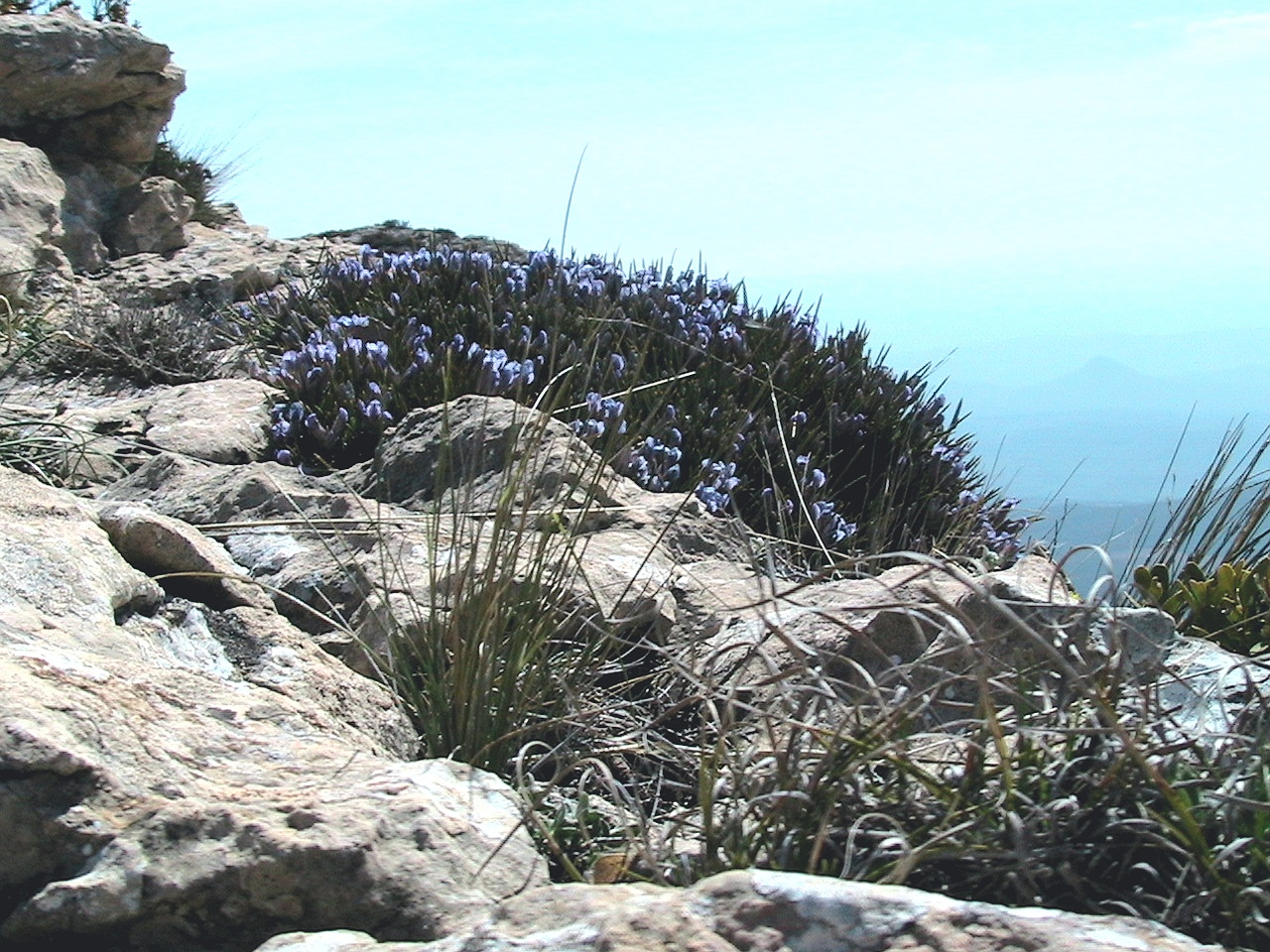
Graell de Roca Alta, Montsec
