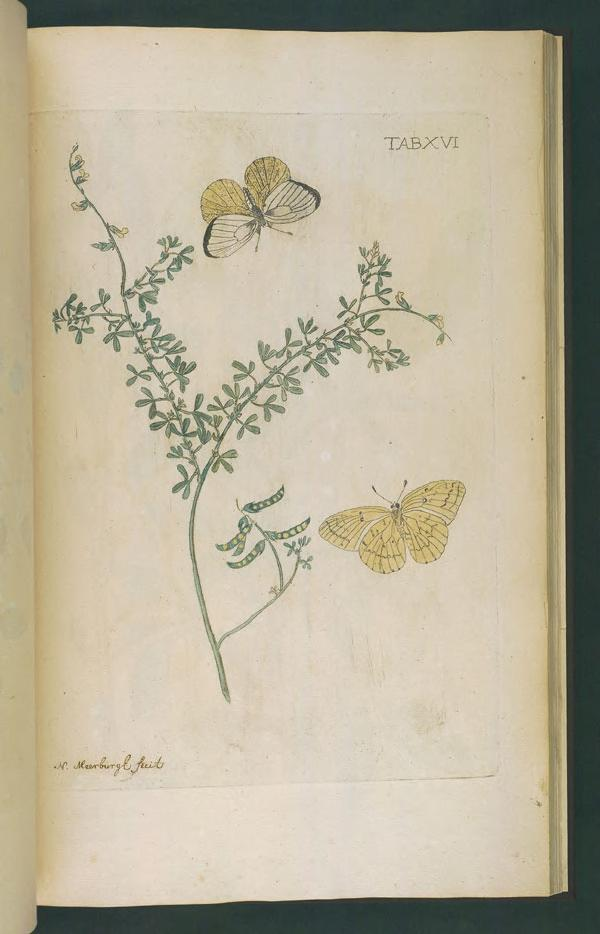
- Melolobium aethiopicum

Scientific classification
- Kingdom: Plantae
- Clade: Tracheophytes
- Clade: Angiosperms
- Clade: Eudicots
- Clade: Rosids
- Order: Fabales
- Family: Fabaceae
- Subfamily: Faboideae
- Tribe: Genisteae
- Genus: Melolobium; Eckl. & Zeyh.

Species
- 14; see text

Synonyms
- Sphingium E.Mey. (1835)

= Melolobium =

Genus of legumes

Melolobium is a genus of flowering plants belonging to the legume family, Fabaceae. It includes 14 species of small shrubs or perennial herbs native to southern Africa, which are found in southern and eastern Namibia, southwestern Botswana, and most of South Africa.

These plants are perennial herbs and small shrubs. Leaves are often sticky with exudate from small surface glands. Some have spine-tipped branches. The leaves have three leaflets. The inflorescence is a terminal raceme of flowers. The flowers are yellow, sometimes fading orange or purple.

== Species ==
Melolobium comprises the following species:

- Melolobium adenodes Eckl. & Zeyh.
- Melolobium aethiopicum (L.) Druce
- Melolobium alpinum Eckl. & Zeyh.
- Melolobium calycinum Benth.
- Melolobium candicans (E. Mey.) Eckl. & Zeyh.
- Melolobium exudans Harv.
- Melolobium humile Eckl. & Zeyh.
- Melolobium lampolobum (E.Mey.) Moteetee & B.-E.van Wyk
- Melolobium macrocalyx Dümmer
- Melolobium microphyllum (L.f.) Eckl. & Zeyh.
- Melolobium obcordatum Harv.
- Melolobium stipulatum Harv.
- Melolobium subspicatum Conrath
- Melolobium wilmsii Harms
