= Podocytisus =

Scientific classification
- Kingdom: Plantae
- Clade: Tracheophytes
- Clade: Angiosperms
- Clade: Eudicots
- Clade: Rosids
- Order: Fabales
- Family: Fabaceae
- Subfamily: Faboideae
- Tribe: Genisteae
- Genus: Podocytisus; Boiss. & Heldr. (1849)
- Species: P. caramanicus

Binomial name
- Podocytisus caramanicus Boiss. & Heldr. (1849)

Synonyms
- Cytisus caramanicus (Boiss. & Heldr.) Nyman; Laburnum caramanicum (Boiss. & Heldr.) Benth. & Hook. f.; Podocytisus americanus G.Nicholson (1894), not validly publ.

Genus of plant in the legume family

Podocytisus caramanicus is a species of flowering plant in the family Fabaceae. It is a shrub native to the western Balkan Peninsula and southern Turkey. It is the only member of the genus Podocytisus. It belongs to the subfamily Faboideae.
