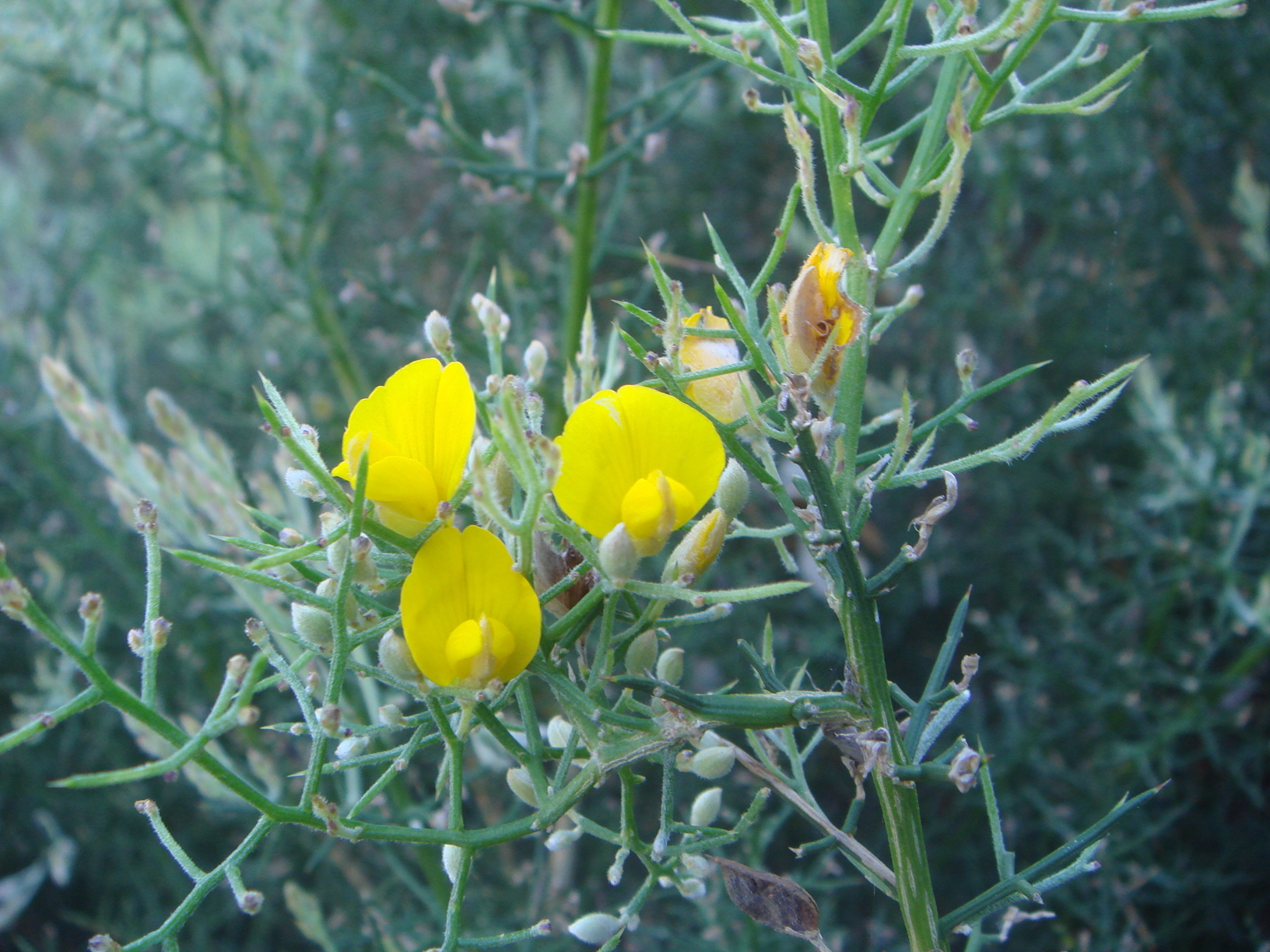
- Stauracanthus boivinii

Scientific classification
- Kingdom: Plantae
- Clade: Tracheophytes
- Clade: Angiosperms
- Clade: Eudicots
- Clade: Rosids
- Order: Fabales
- Family: Fabaceae
- Subfamily: Faboideae
- Tribe: Genisteae
- Genus: Stauracanthus; Link (1807)

Species
- 3; see text

Synonyms
- Leonhardia Opiz (1857), nom. superfl.; Nepa Webb (1852)

= Stauracanthus =

Genus of legumes

Stauracanthus is a genus of flowering plants in the family Fabaceae. It includes three species of shrubs and suffrutices native to the Iberian Peninsula (Spain and Portugal) and northwestern Africa (Algeria and Morocco). They grow in Mediterranean-climate maquis (shrubland), woodland, heaths, and coastal scrub, on sandy or stony alluvium and coastal dunes. It belongs to subfamily Faboideae. It is sometimes treated as part of the genera Genista or Ulex.

== Species ==
Stauracanthus comprises the following species:

- Stauracanthus boivinii (Webb) Samp.
- Stauracanthus genistoides (Brot.) Samp.
  - subsp. aphyllus (Link)Rothm.
  - subsp. genistoides (Brot.)Samp.
  - subsp. vicentinus (Cout.)Rothm.
- Stauracanthus spectabilis Webb
