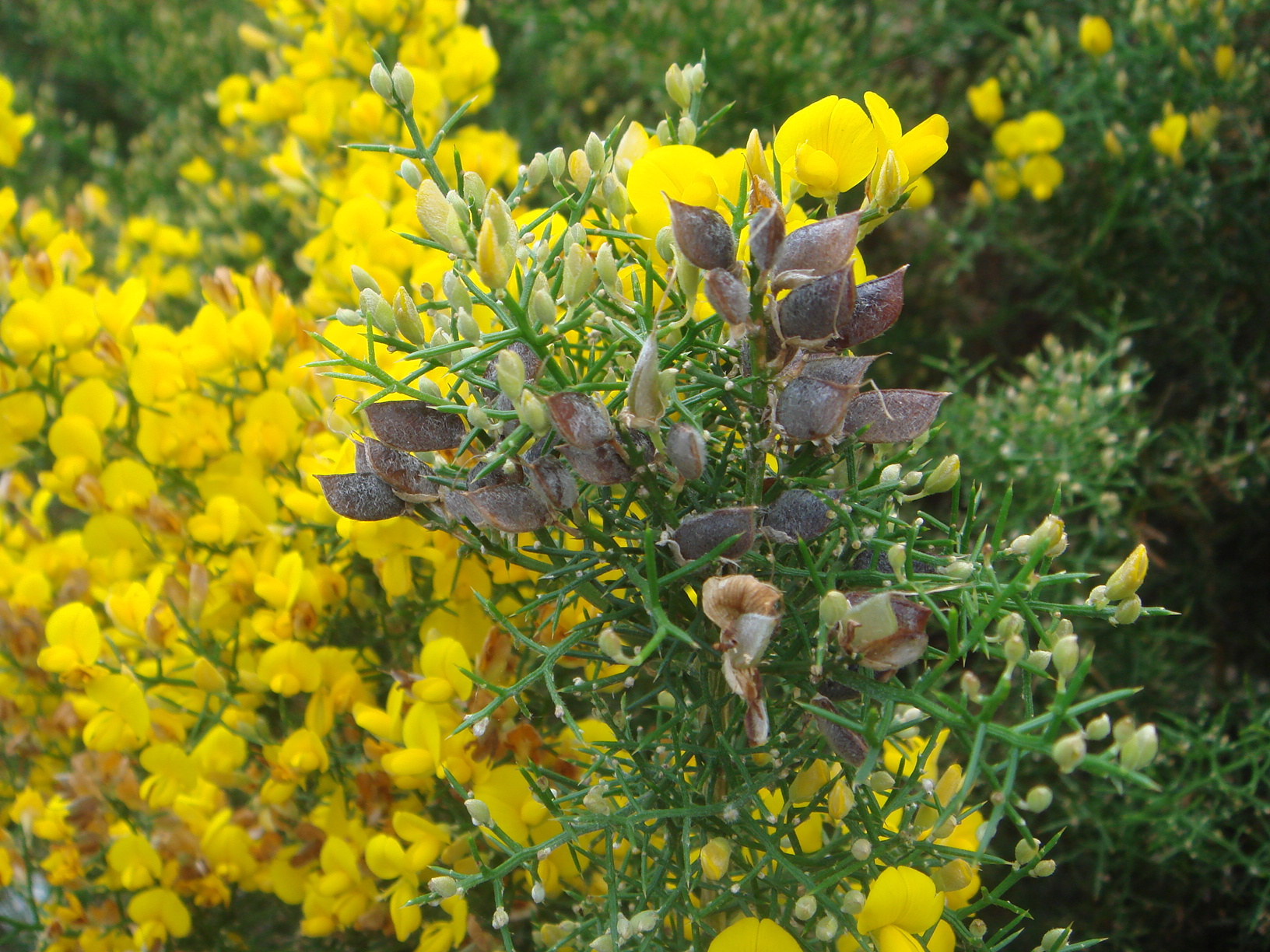

Scientific classification
- Kingdom: Plantae
- Clade: Tracheophytes
- Clade: Angiosperms
- Clade: Eudicots
- Clade: Rosids
- Order: Fabales
- Family: Fabaceae
- Subfamily: Faboideae
- Genus: Stauracanthus
- Species: S. boivinii

Binomial name
- Stauracanthus boivinii (Webb) Samp.

Synonyms
- Lygos dasycarpa (Coss.) Jäger; Leonhardia boivinii (Webb) Opiz; Nepa boivinii (Webb) Webb; Ulex boivinii Webb; Leonhardia cossonii (Webb) Opiz; Leonhardia escayracii (Webb) Opiz; Leonhardia lurida (Webb) Opiz; Leonhardia megalorites (Webb) Opiz; Leonhardia salzmannii (Webb) Opiz; Leonhardia vaillantii (Webb) Opiz; Leonhardia webbiana (Coss.) Opiz; Nepa boivinii var. tazensis (Braun-Blanq. & Maire) Valdés; Nepa cossonii Webb; Nepa escayracii Webb; Nepa lurida Webb; Nepa megalorites Webb; Nepa salzmannii Webb; Nepa vaillantii Webb; Nepa webbiana (Coss.) Webb; Stauracanthus boivinii f. escayracii (Webb) Samp.; Stauracanthus boivinii f. luridus (Webb) Samp.; Stauracanthus boivinii f. vaillantii (Webb) Samp.; Stauracanthus boivinii f. webbianus (Coss.) Samp.; Stauracanthus nepa Samp.; Stauracanthus nepa f. escayracii (Webb) Samp.; Stauracanthus nepa f. lurida (Webb) Samp.; Stauracanthus nepa f. vaillantii (Webb) Samp.; Stauracanthus nepa f. webbiana (Coss.) Samp.; Ulex boivinii Coss. ex Nyman; Ulex boivinii var. cossonii (Webb) Maire; Ulex boivinii var. megalorites (Webb) Ball; Ulex boivinii var. narcissi Sennen; Ulex boivinii var. pilosulus Sennen ex Maire; Ulex boivinii var. salzmannii (Webb) Ball; Ulex boivinii var. tazensis (Braun-Blanq. & Maire) Maire; Ulex boivinii var. webbianus (Coss.) Maire; Ulex ceballosii Pau; Ulex cossonii (Webb) Nyman; Ulex escayracii (Webb) Nyman; Ulex luridus Nyman; Ulex megalorites (Webb) Willk.; Ulex narcisii f. pilosula Sennen; Ulex narcissi Sennen; Ulex salzmannii (Webb) Willk.; Ulex tazensis (Braun-Blanq. & Maire) Pau & Font Quer; Ulex vaillantii (Webb) Nyman; Ulex vaillantii var. escayracii (Webb) Cout.; Ulex vidalii Pau; Ulex webbianus Coss.; Ulex webbianus var. megalorites (Webb) Maire; Ulex webbianus var. tazensis Braun-Blanq. & Maire

= Stauracanthus boivinii =

Species of flowering plant in the legume family

Stauracanthus boivinii is a flowering bush species in the family Fabaceae, native to the Iberian Peninsula (Portugal and Spain) and North Africa (Morocco and Algeria).
