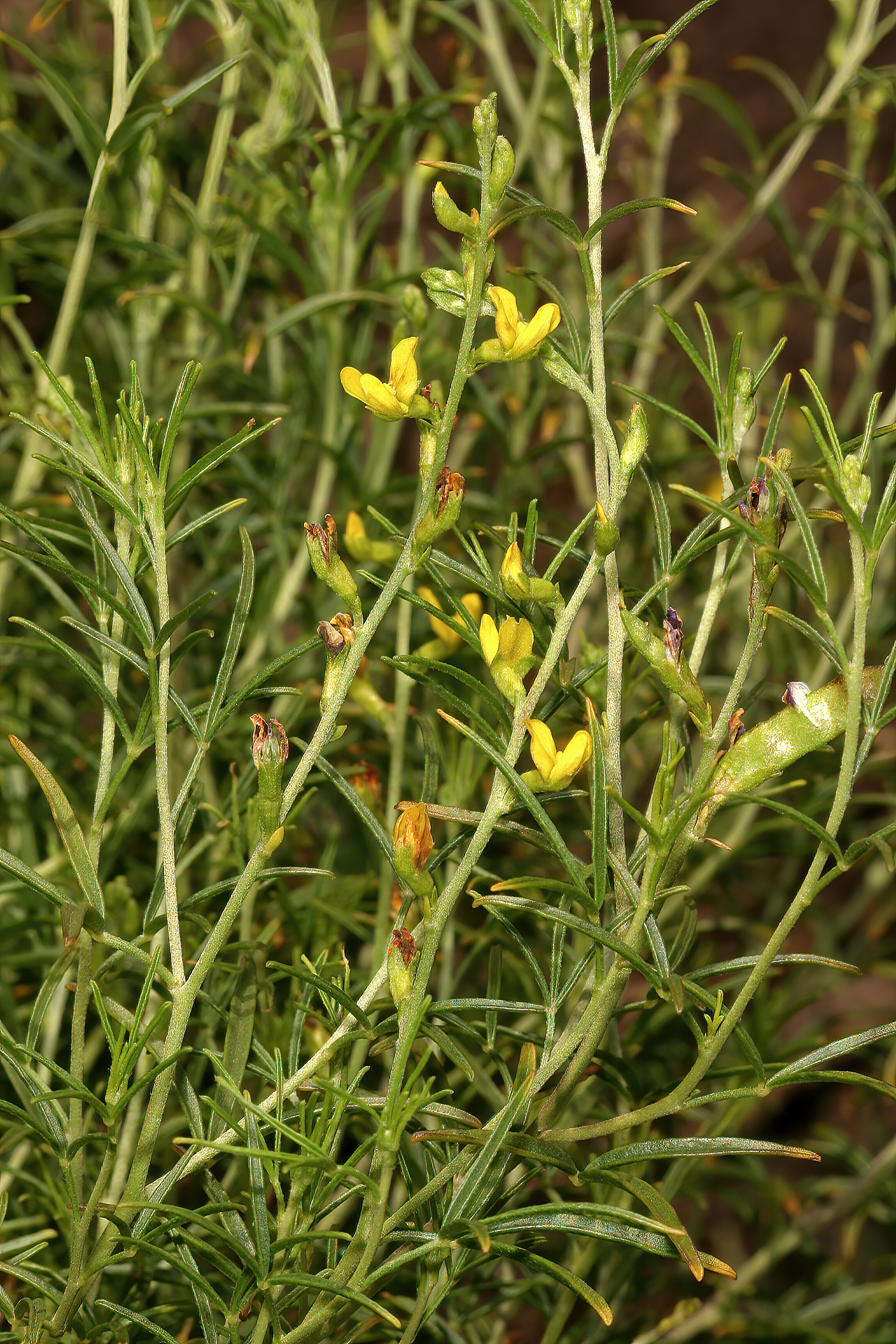

Conservation status
- Endangered (IUCN 3.1)

Scientific classification
- Kingdom: Plantae
- Clade: Tracheophytes
- Clade: Angiosperms
- Clade: Eudicots
- Clade: Rosids
- Order: Fabales
- Family: Fabaceae
- Subfamily: Faboideae
- Genus: Melolobium
- Species: M. subspicatum

Binomial name
- Melolobium subspicatum Conrath

= Melolobium subspicatum =

Species of legume

Melolobium subspicatum is a species of flowering plant in the family Fabaceae. It is endemic to the Northern Provinces of South Africa. Its natural habitat is subtropical or tropical dry lowland grassland, and it is threatened by habitat loss.
