= Gonocytisus =

Scientific classification
- Kingdom: Plantae
- Clade: Tracheophytes
- Clade: Angiosperms
- Clade: Eudicots
- Clade: Rosids
- Order: Fabales
- Family: Fabaceae
- Subfamily: Faboideae
- Tribe: Genisteae
- Genus: Gonocytisus; Spach (1845)

Species
- Gonocytisus angulatus (L.) Spach; Gonocytisus dirmilensis Hub.-Mor.; Gonocytisus pterocladus (Boiss.) Spach

Genus of legumes

Gonocytisus is a genus of flowering plants in the family Fabaceae. It belongs to the subfamily Faboideae. It includes three species of shrubs native to the eastern Mediterranean, ranging from Greece through Turkey and the levant. They grow in lowland and submontane Mediterranean woodland and shrubland (maquis), where they are often found on cliffs and dry hillsides.
