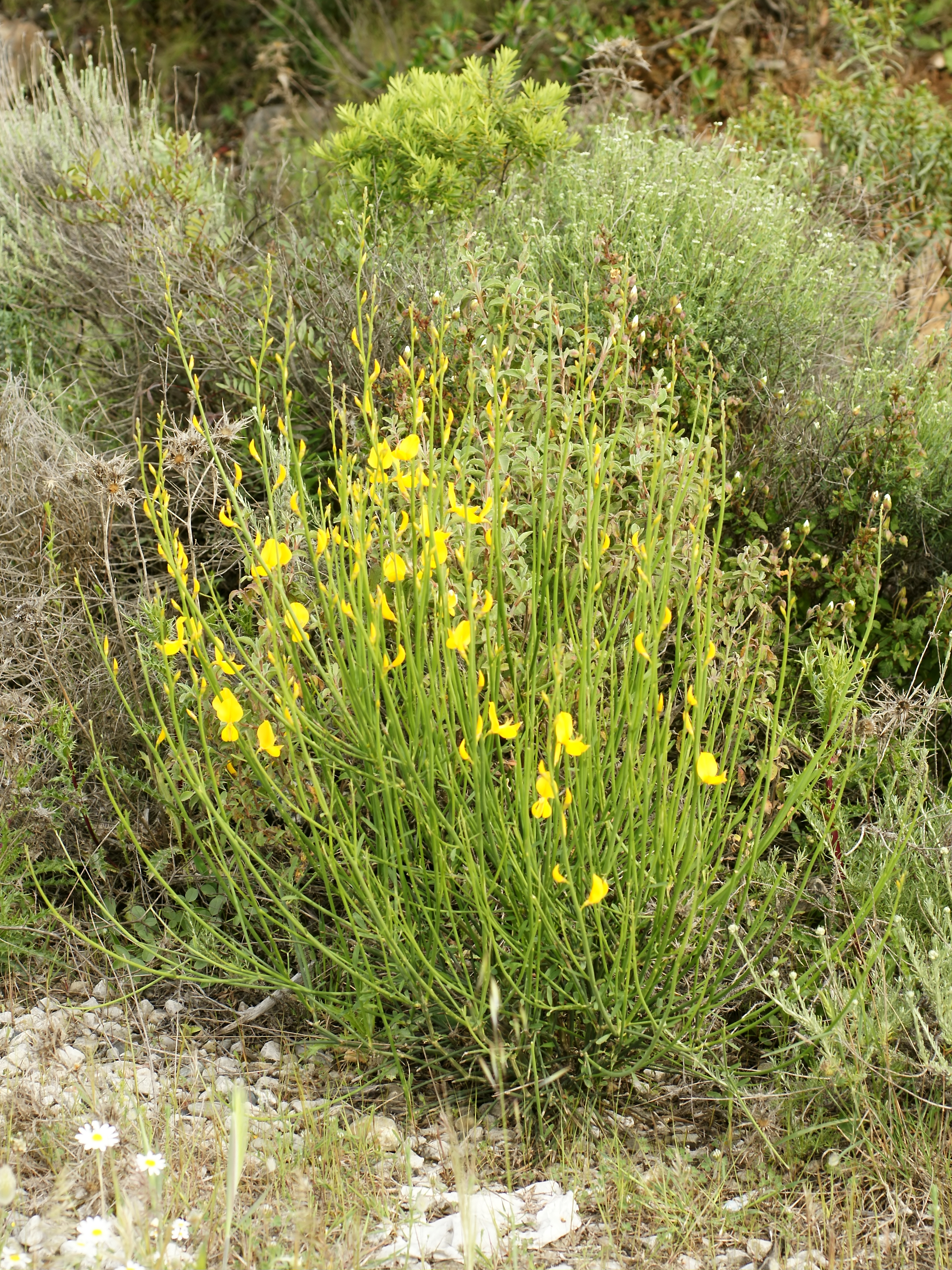

Scientific classification
- Kingdom: Plantae
- Clade: Tracheophytes
- Clade: Angiosperms
- Clade: Eudicots
- Clade: Rosids
- Order: Fabales
- Family: Fabaceae
- Subfamily: Faboideae
- Tribe: Genisteae
- Genus: Spartium; L.
- Species: S. junceum

Binomial name
- Spartium junceum L.

Synonyms
- Genus: Spartianthus Link; Species: Cytisus junceus (L.) Vuk.; Genista acutifolia Spach; Genista Americana Spach; Genista hispanica Garsault; Genista juncea (L.) Scop.; Genista odorata Moench; Genista odoratissima Spach; Spartanthus americanus Steud.; Spartanthus junceus Link; Spartium acutifolium Lindl.; Spartium americanum Meyen; Spartium japonicum Miq.; Spartium odoratissimum D.Don ex Steud.; Spartium odoratum Dulac

= Spartium =

Species of plant native to the Mediterranean

Spartium junceum, known as Spanish broom, rush broom, or weaver's broom, it is a species of flowering plant in the family Fabaceae and the sole species in the genus Spartium. It is closely related to the other brooms (in the genera Cytisus and Genista).

== Description ==
Spartium junceum is a vigorous, deciduous shrub growing to 2–4 metres (7–13 feet) tall, rarely 5 m (16 ft), with main stems up to 5 centimetres (2 inches) thick, rarely 10 cm (4 in). It has thick, somewhat succulent grey-green rush-like shoots with very sparse small deciduous leaves 1 to 3 cm (1/2 to 1 1/4 in) long and up to 4 millimetres (1/8 in) broad. The leaves are of little importance to the plant, with much of the photosynthesis occurring in the green shoots (a water-conserving strategy in its dry climate). The leaves fall away early. In late spring and summer shoots are covered in profuse fragrant yellow pea-like flowers 1 to 2 cm across. In late summer, the legumes (seed pods) mature black and reach 8–10 cm (3–4 in) long. They burst open, often with an audible crack, spreading seed from the parent plant.

== Taxonomy ==
The Greek name Spartium given to the genus denotes the use of the plant for 'cordage'. The Latin specific epithet junceum means "rush-like", referring to the shoots, which show a passing resemblance to those of the rush genus Juncus.

== Distribution and habitat ==
This species is native to the Mediterranean in southern Europe, southwest Asia and northwest Africa, where it is found in sunny sites, usually on dry, sandy soils.

=== As an invasive species ===
Spartium junceum has been widely introduced into other areas, and is regarded as a noxious invasive species in places with a Mediterranean climate such as California and Oregon, Hawaii, central Chile, southeastern Australia, the Western Cape in South Africa and the Canary Islands and Azores. It was first introduced to California as an ornamental plant.

== Toxicity ==
Few cases have been described of intoxication by the S. junceum, including accidental ingestion of different parts of the plant by children. The alkaloids found in all parts of the plant have toxic effects. They initially provoke a transitory stimulation of nicotinic cholinergic receptors followed by a persistent inhibition caused by desensitization. The sparteine has an effect on the heart, reducing its sensitivity and conductivity.

Symptoms present depending on dose, method of exposure, and time elapsed since exposure; these include irritation of the oral and pharyngeal mucosa, hypersalivation, vomiting, stomach pain and diarrhea. In severe cases, neurological symptoms (such as midriasis, headaches, delirium and convulsions) may be present, as well as hypotension, bradycardia, and coma.

== Uses ==
The plant is used as an ornamental plant in gardens and in landscape plantings. It has gained the Royal Horticultural Society's Award of Garden Merit.

In Bolivia and Peru, where it is known as retama, (not to be confused with the genus Retama) and has become invasive in some areas. It is one of the most common ornamental plants, often seen growing along sidewalks in La Paz.

It has traditionally been used for the production of fiber, especially for tying vines. It is also used as a hedge because of its nitrogen-fixing quality. The plant is also used as a flavoring, and for its essential oil, known as genet absolute. Its fibers have been used for cloth and it produces a yellow dye. The branches are used to make brooms.

=== Pharmacology ===
In work carried out on normoglycemic mice at the Faculty of Chemistry of the University of the Republic of Uruguay, the infusion of the flowers were proven to have hypoglycemiant effects. In Turkey, the flowers have been used in traditional medicine to treat ulcers; Turkish studies from 1999 and 2000 have identified a saponin in the plant which has antiulcer properties.

== Culture ==
Spartium junceum has made its way into the ethnobotany of the indigenous Aymara and Quechua cultures, in which it is believed to protect against evil, probably influenced by similar traditions of Hispanic origin. In Peru, it is known as retama, qarwash, inca pancara, talhui.

The Peruvian huayno, Flor de Retama, written by Ricardo Dolorier in 1969, references the yellow flower and the Huanta massacre which occurred that year. Subsequently, all retama flowers were removed from the main plaza out of fear of government repression; today, the entrances to Huanta are planted with the flower.

Known in Catalan as ginesta, it has been regarded as the national flower of Catalonia, sometimes in combination with red poppies.

== Gallery ==
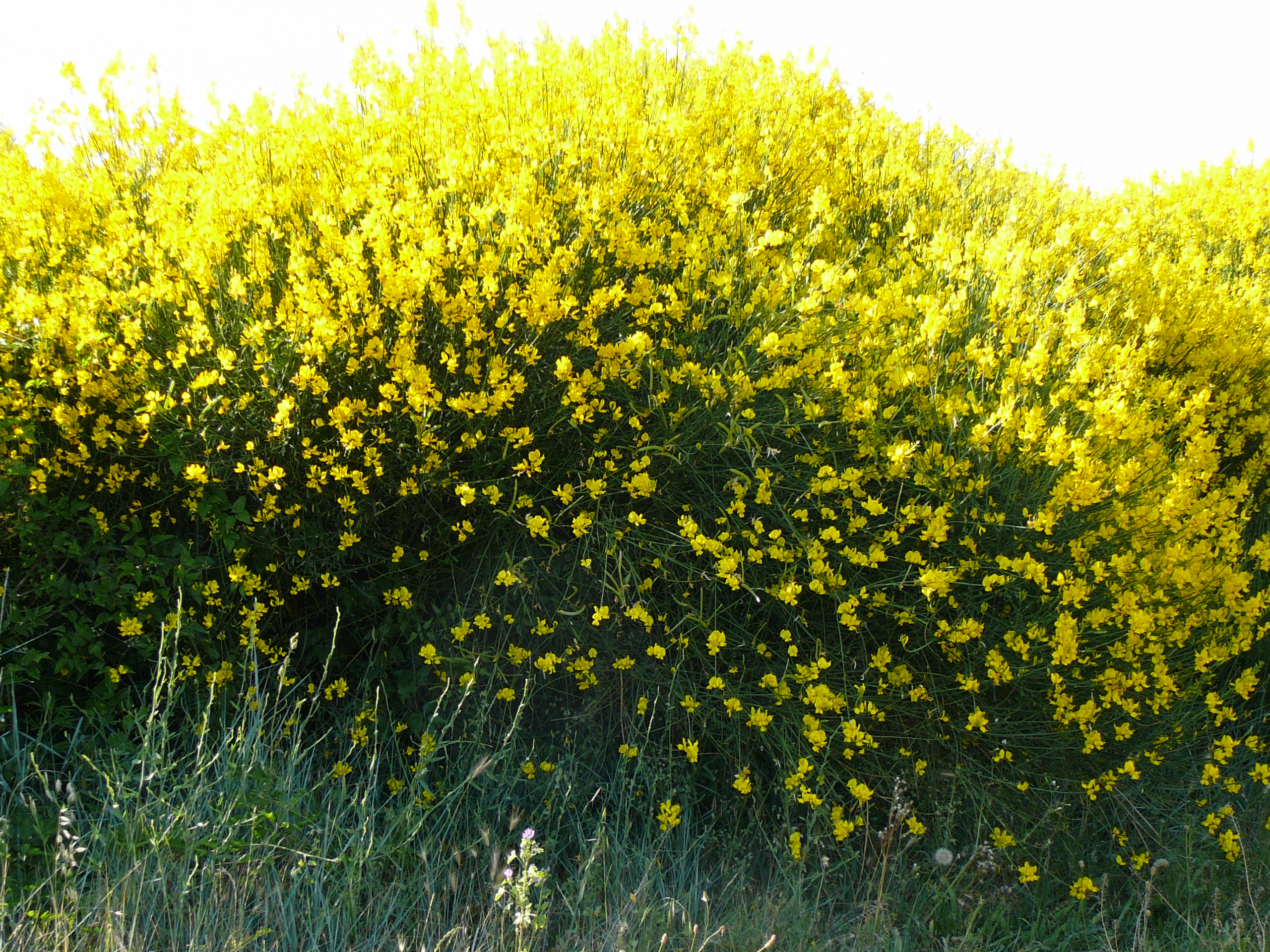
A stand of plants with many blooms, France

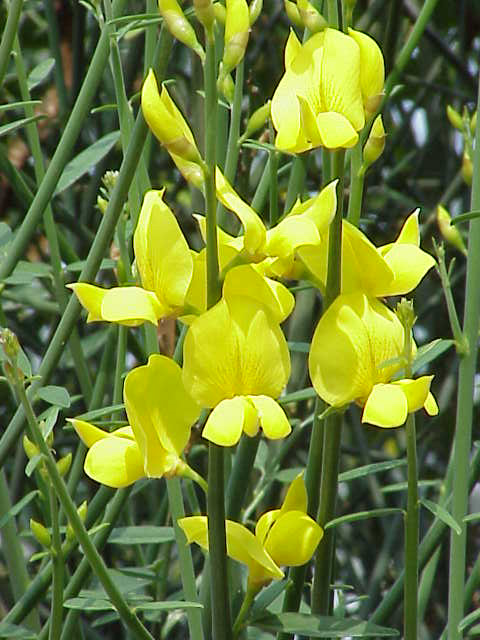
Flowers

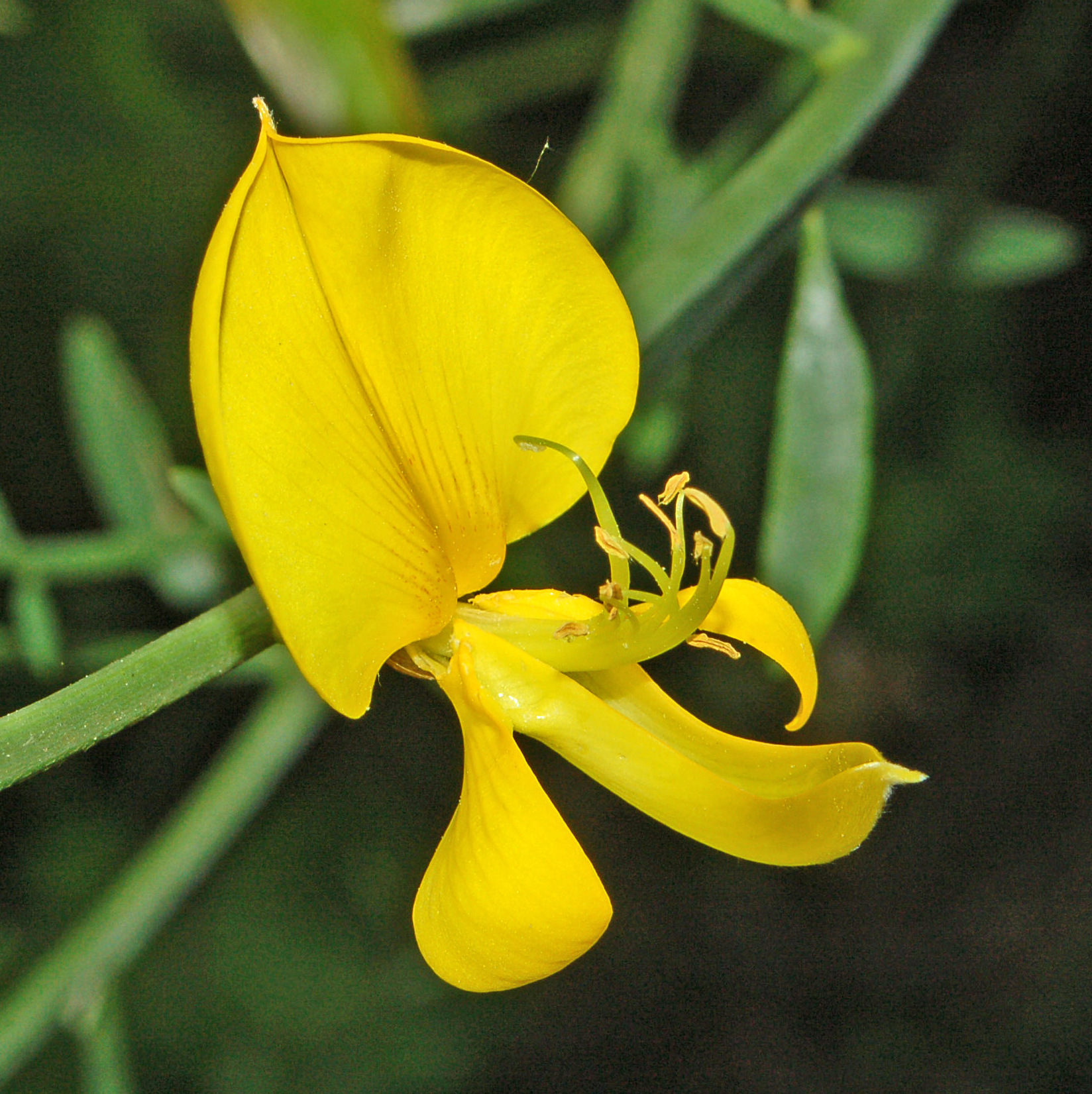
Close-up of a flower

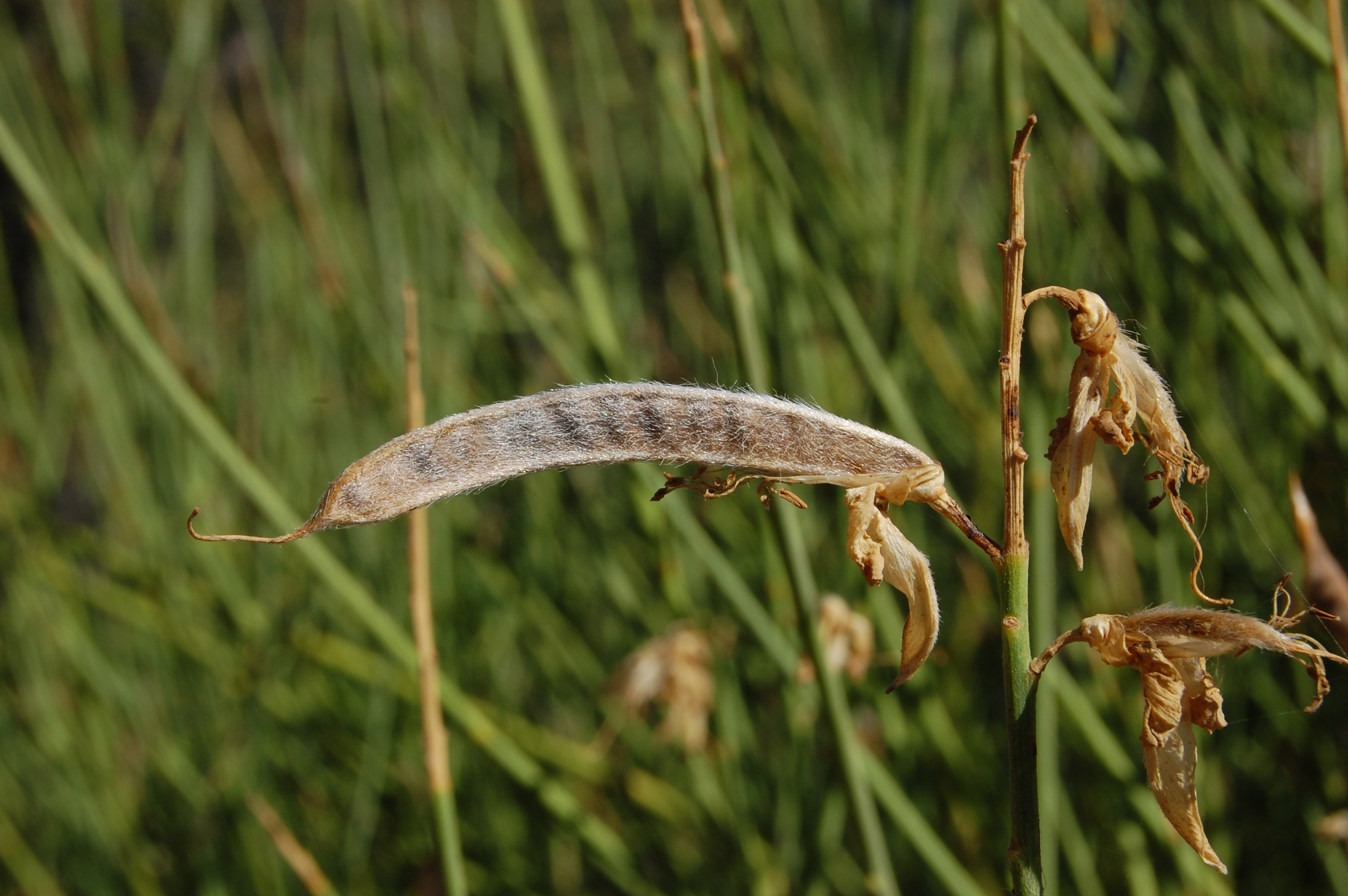
Mature fruit
