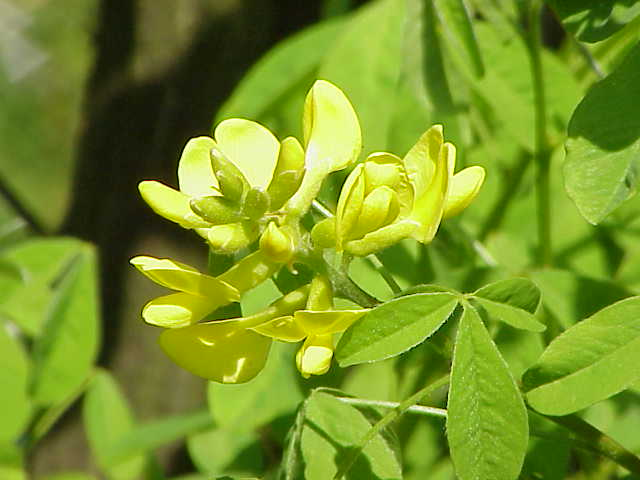

Conservation status
- Least Concern (IUCN 3.1)

Scientific classification
- Kingdom: Plantae
- Clade: Tracheophytes
- Clade: Angiosperms
- Clade: Eudicots
- Clade: Rosids
- Order: Fabales
- Family: Fabaceae
- Subfamily: Faboideae
- Tribe: Genisteae
- Genus: Petteria; C.Presl (1845)
- Species: P. ramentacea

Binomial name
- Petteria ramentacea (Sieber) C.Presl (1845)

Synonyms
- Cytisus fragrans Welden (1832), nom. illeg.; Cytisus ramentaceus Sieber (1822); Cytisus weldenii Vis. (1830); Genista ramentacea (Sieber) Briq. (1894); Genista weldeniana Scheele (1843); Laburnum fragrans Griseb. (1843); Laburnum nubigenum J.Presl (1830); Laburnum ramentaceum (Sieber) K.Koch (1869); Laburnum weldenii Griseb. ex Lavallée (1877)

= Petteria =

Genus of legumes

Petteria ramentacea, commonly known as Dalmatian laburnum, is a species of flowering plant in the family Fabaceae. It is a deciduous shrub native to the western Balkan Peninsula, including Greece, Albania, Bosnia and Herzegovina, and Montenegro. It grows up to 3 meters tall, and flowers in May. It grow in shrubland and scrub from 10 to 700 meters elevation, in both sub-Mediterranean and Mediterranean habitats. It belongs to the subfamily Faboideae. It is the only member of the genus Petteria.
