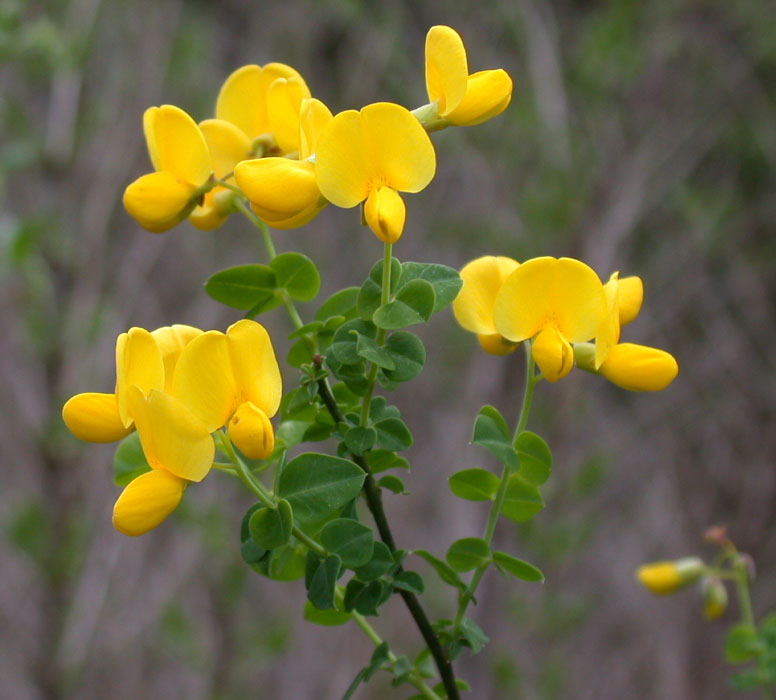

Scientific classification
- Kingdom: Plantae
- Clade: Tracheophytes
- Clade: Angiosperms
- Clade: Eudicots
- Clade: Rosids
- Order: Fabales
- Family: Fabaceae
- Subfamily: Faboideae
- Tribe: Genisteae
- Genus: Cytisophyllum; O.Lang (1843)
- Species: C. sessilifolium

Binomial name
- Cytisophyllum sessilifolium (L.) O.Lang (1843)

Synonyms
- Cytisus L. (1753), nom. rej.; Phyllocytisus E.Fourn. (1868); Cytisus lobelii Tausch in Flora 21: 739 (1838); Cytisus sessilifolius L. in Sp. Pl.: 739 (1753); Cytisus sessilifolius f. leucanthus (Jacob-Makoy) Zabel (1903); Cytisus sessilifolius var. leucanthus Jacob-Makoy (1868); Cytisus sessilis Mill. (1768); Genista sessilifolia (L.) E.H.L.Krause (1901), nom. illeg.; Genista tabernaemontani Scheele (1843); Laburnum sessilifolium (L.) J.Presl (1830); Lembotropis sessilifolia (L.) K.Koch (1869); Phyllocytisus sessilifolius (L.) Fourr. (1868); Spartium sessilifolium (L.) Cav. (1803); Spartocytisus sessilifolius (L.) Webb & Berthel. (1842); Spartotamnus sessilifolius (L.) C.Presl (1844)

= Cytisophyllum =

Genus of legumes

Cytisophyllum sessilifolium is a species of flowering plants in the family, Fabaceae. It belongs to the subfamily Faboideae. It is a shrub native to eastern Spain, southern France, and Italy. It is the only member of the genus Cytisophyllum.
