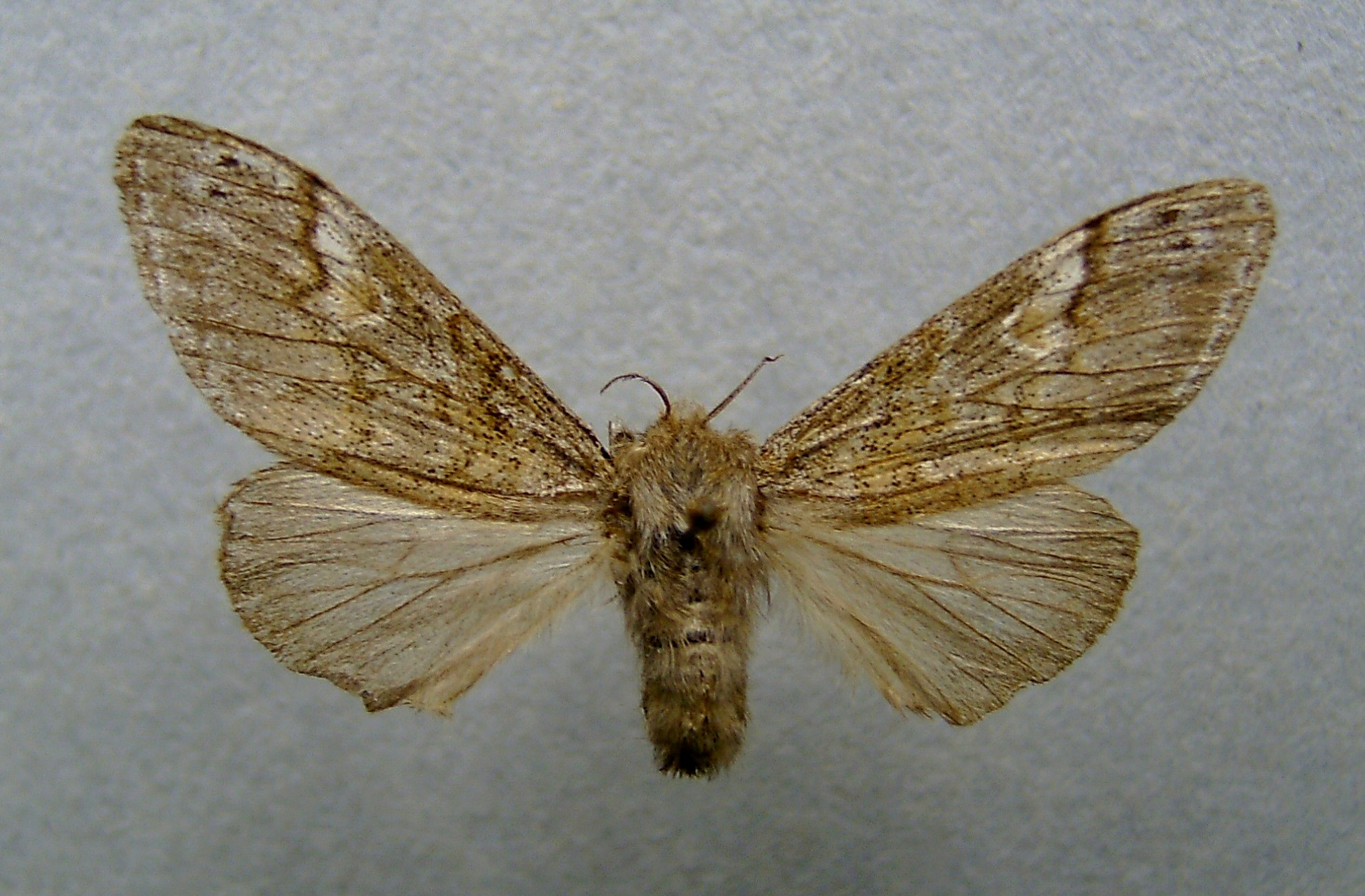
- Female

Scientific classification
- Domain: Eukaryota
- Kingdom: Animalia
- Phylum: Arthropoda
- Class: Insecta
- Order: Lepidoptera
- Superfamily: Noctuoidea
- Family: Erebidae
- Genus: Calliteara
- Species: C. fortunata

Binomial name
- Calliteara fortunata (Rogenhofer, 1891)

Synonyms
- Dasychira fortunata Rogenhofer, 1891; Dicallomera fortunata

= Calliteara fortunata =

Species of moth

Calliteara fortunata is a moth of the family Erebidae first described by Alois Friedrich Rogenhofer in 1891. It is found on the Canary Islands.

The wingspan is 35–45 for males and 43–60 mm for females.

The larvae feed on Pinus canariensis, Adenocarpus foliolosus and Myrica faya.
