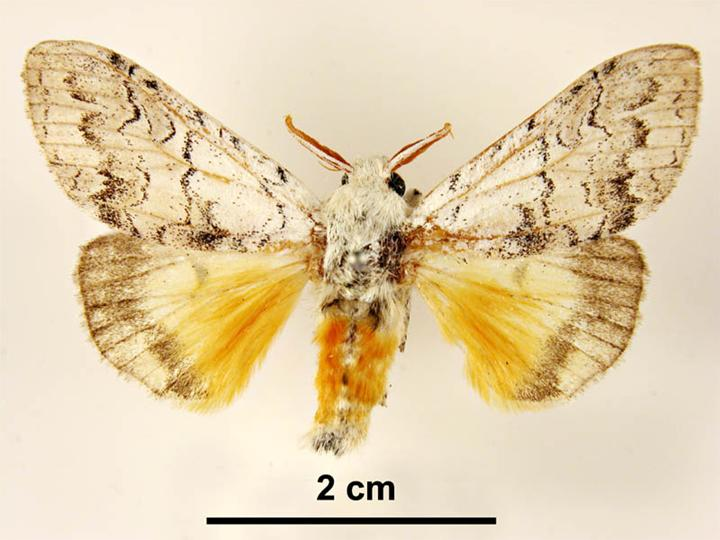

Scientific classification
- Domain: Eukaryota
- Kingdom: Animalia
- Phylum: Arthropoda
- Class: Insecta
- Order: Lepidoptera
- Superfamily: Noctuoidea
- Family: Erebidae
- Genus: Calliteara
- Species: C. farenoides

Binomial name
- Calliteara farenoides (T.P Lucas, 1892)

Synonyms
- Teara farenoides Lucas, 1892; Dasychira queenslandica Strand, 1915

= Calliteara farenoides =

Species of moth

Calliteara farenoides is a species of moth of the family Erebidae. It is found in Queensland.

The wingspan is about 40 mm for males and 60 mm for females.

== Taxonomy ==
Calliteara farenoides is sometimes treated a subspecies of Calliteara horsfieldii.
