= Adenocarpus ombriosus =

Conservation status
- Endangered (IUCN 3.1)

Scientific classification
- Kingdom: Plantae
- Clade: Tracheophytes
- Clade: Angiosperms
- Clade: Eudicots
- Clade: Rosids
- Order: Fabales
- Family: Fabaceae
- Subfamily: Faboideae
- Genus: Adenocarpus
- Species: A. ombriosus

Binomial name
- Adenocarpus ombriosus Ceballos & Ortuno

Species of legume

Adenocarpus ombriosus is a species of flowering plant in the Faboideae subfamily that is endemic to El Hierro of the Canary Islands, where it can be found on the elevation of 500 metres (1,600 ft) and 1.400 metres (4 ft 7.1 in).

== Population ==
In 2004 there were only 339 individuals that existed. Eight of those were found in El Salvador, one in Hoya de Arinés, 290 in Hoya de Fileba and another 40 in Jinámar province. As of 2007 the population decreased by 2 in El Salvador but increased by 2 in Jinámar. Meanwhile, the population of Adenocarpus ombriosus in Hoya de Arinés gone to zero, and in Hoya de Fileba it was decreased by almost a half (141 individuals).
