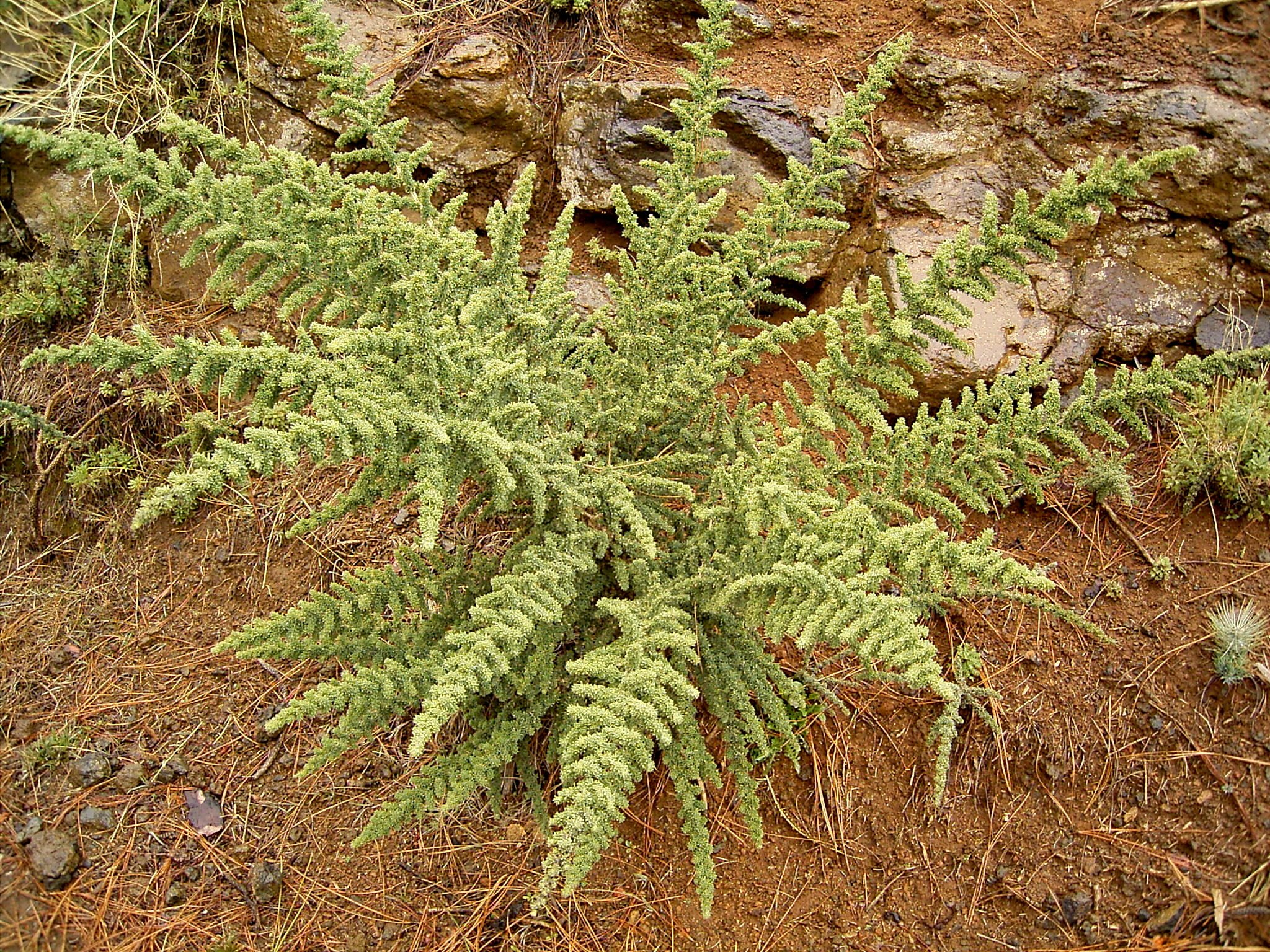

Conservation status
- Least Concern (IUCN 3.1)

Scientific classification
- Kingdom: Plantae
- Clade: Tracheophytes
- Clade: Angiosperms
- Clade: Eudicots
- Clade: Rosids
- Order: Fabales
- Family: Fabaceae
- Subfamily: Faboideae
- Genus: Adenocarpus
- Species: A. viscosus

Binomial name
- Adenocarpus viscosus (Willd.) Webb & Berthel.

Synonyms
- Adenocarpus anagyrus Spreng.; Adenocarpus frankenioides DC.; Genista viscosa Willd.

= Adenocarpus viscosus =

Species of legume

Adenocarpus viscosus is a shrubby species of flowering plant in the legume family Fabaceae, subfamily Faboideae. It is endemic to the Canary Islands where it is known locally as Codeso del Pico. It can be found above 1,800 metres (5,900 ft) on two of the islands, La Palma in Caldera de Tabouriente and Tenerife where it is a dominant shrub in Teide National Park and occurs in parts of Corona Forestal Nature Park and Reserva Especial de las Palomas.

== Habitat ==
The plant grows in subalpine climate and prefers xeric habitats. It is often found in high-altitude pine forest, among Pinus canariensis and at higher altitude, above the tree line.

== Threat status ==
Even though it is not threatened, the species still are vulnerable to habitat destruction and various invasive species.
