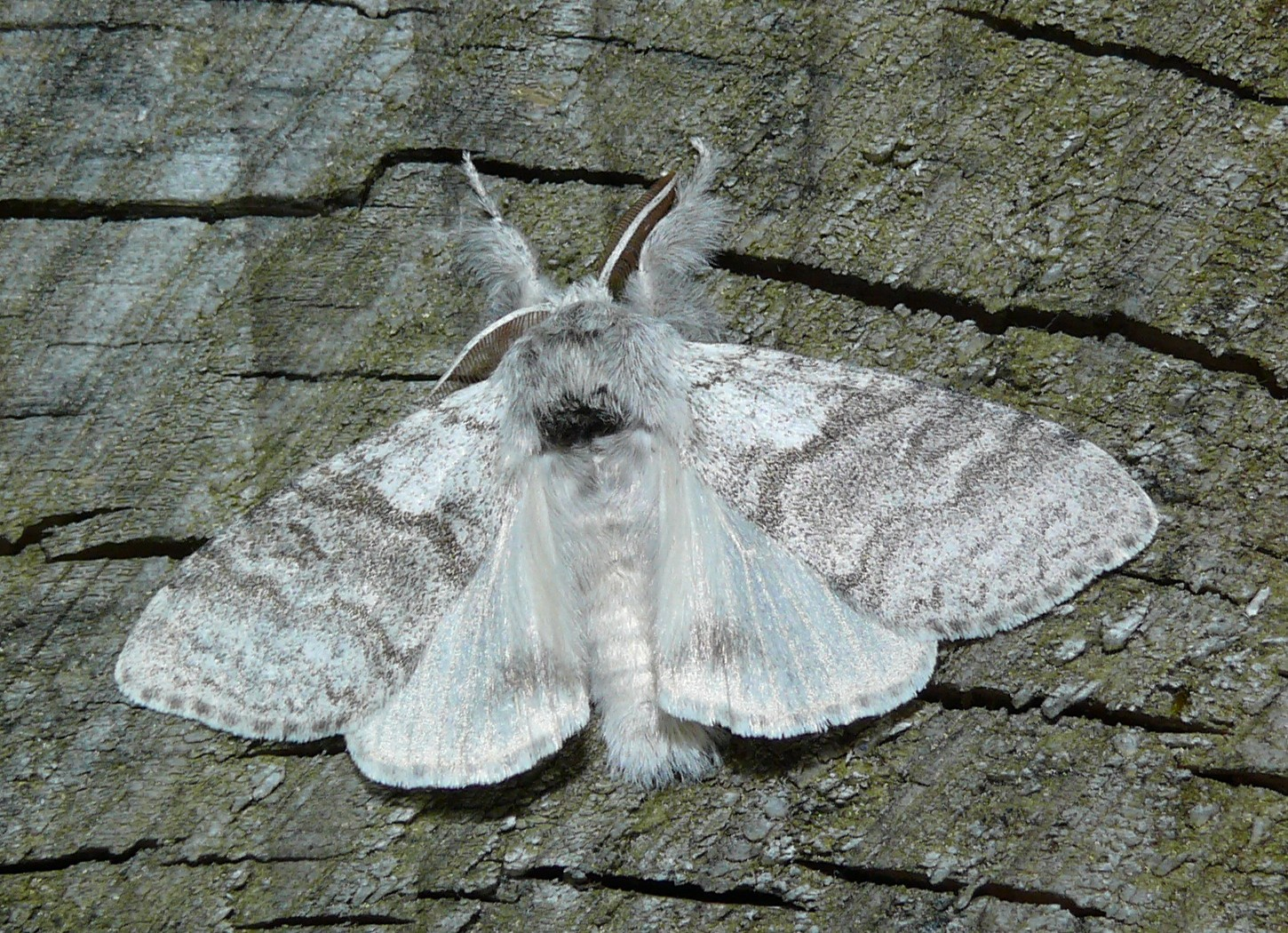
- Calliteara pudibunda

Scientific classification
- Kingdom: Animalia
- Phylum: Arthropoda
- Clade: Pancrustacea
- Class: Insecta
- Order: Lepidoptera
- Superfamily: Noctuoidea
- Family: Erebidae
- Tribe: Orgyiini
- Genus: Calliteara; Butler, 1881

Synonyms
- Dasychira Hübner, [1806]; Axiologa Turner, 1904; Elkneria Börner, 1932; Macaronesia Bacallado & Gómez Bustillo & Vives, 1981

= Calliteara =

Genus of moths

Calliteara is a genus of tussock moths in the family Erebidae. The genus was erected by Arthur Gardiner Butler in 1881.

== Species ==
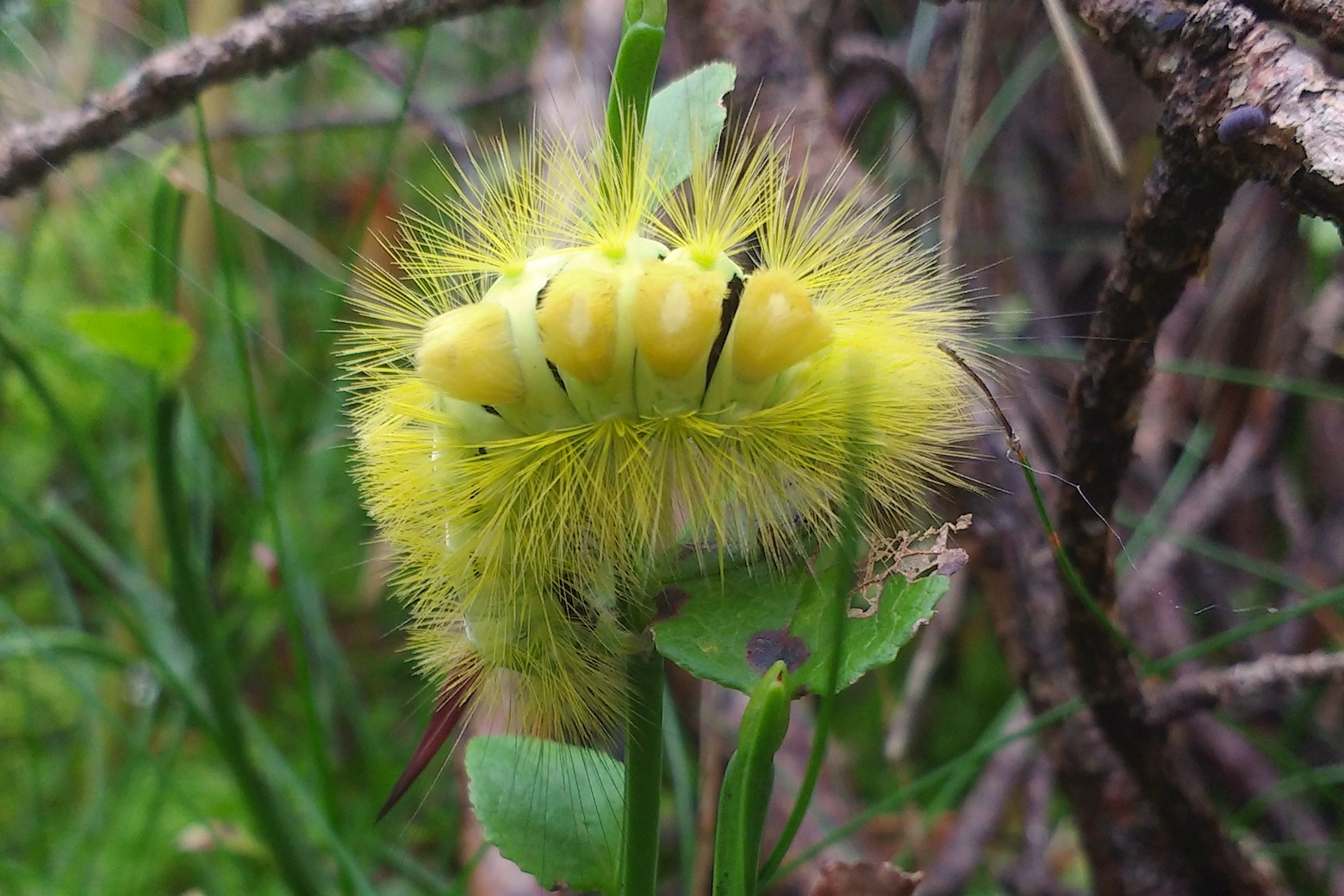
Calliteara pudibunda - caterpillar

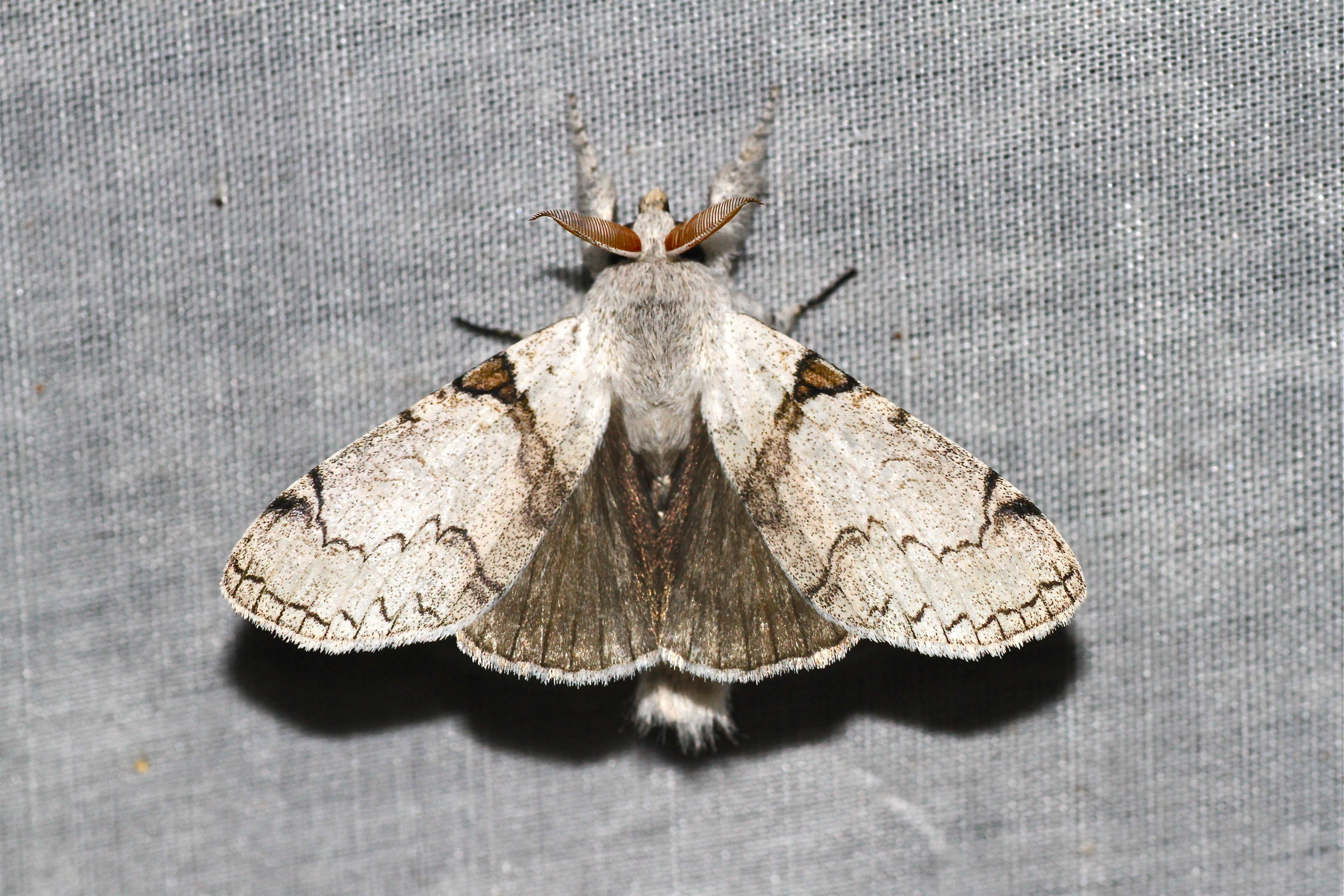
Calliteara diplozona

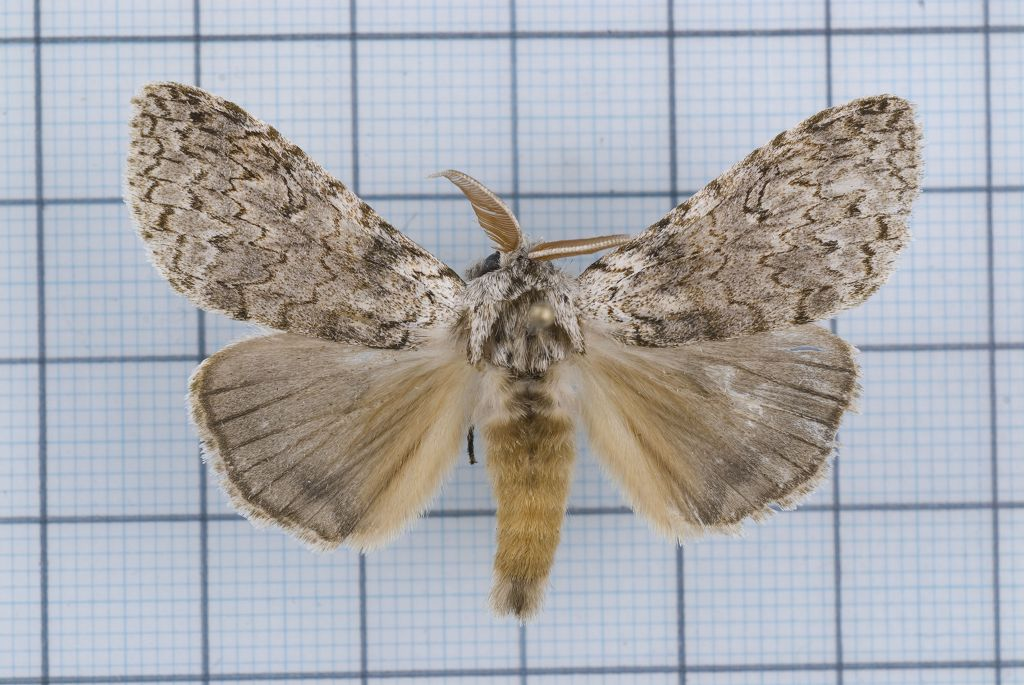
Calliteara taiwana

- The pudibunda species group
  - Calliteara argentata (Butler, 1881)
  - Calliteara cerigoides (Walker, 1862)
  - Calliteara grotei (Moore, 1859)
  - Calliteara horsfieldii (Saunders, 1851)
  - Calliteara pudibunda (Linnaeus, 1758)
  - Calliteara zelotica (Collenette, 1932)
- The strigata species group
  - Calliteara strigata (Moore, 1879)
- The varia species group
  - Calliteara diplozona (Collenette, 1932)
  - Calliteara lairdae (Holloway, 1976)
  - Calliteara pseudolairdae Holloway, 1999
  - Calliteara varia (Walker, 1855)
- The angulata species group
  - Calliteara angulata (Hampson, 1895)
  - Calliteara aphrasta (Collenette, 1938)
  - Calliteara argyroides (Collenette, 1932)
- The minor species group
  - Calliteara box Holloway, 1991
  - Calliteara cox Schintlmeister, 1994
  - Calliteara minor (Bethune-Baker, 1904)
- The fidjiensis species group
  - Calliteara fidjiensis (Mabille & Vuillot, 1890)
  - Calliteara nandarivatu (Robinson, 1968)
- Unknown species group
  - Calliteara abietis (Denis & Schiffermüller, 1775)
  - Calliteara angiana (Joicey & Talbot, 1916)
  - Calliteara apoblepta (Collenette, 1955)
  - Calliteara arizana (Wileman, 1911)
  - Calliteara axutha (Collenette, 1934)
  - Calliteara baibarana (Matsumura, 1927)
  - Calliteara brunnea (Bethune-Baker, 1904)
  - Calliteara cerebosa (Swinhoe, 1903)
  - Calliteara cinctata (Moore, 1879)
  - Calliteara complicata (Walker, 1865)
  - Calliteara conjuncta (Wileman, 1911)
  - Calliteara contexta Kishida, 1998
  - Calliteara enneaphora (Collenette, 1955)
  - Calliteara farenoides (Lucas, 1892)
  - Calliteara flavobrunnea Robinson, 1969)
  - Calliteara fortunata (Rogenhofer, 1891)
  - Calliteara hesychima Collenette, 1955)
  - Calliteara himalayana Kishida, 1994
  - Calliteara kaszabi (Daniel, 1969)
  - Calliteara katanga (Collenette, 1938)
  - Calliteara kenricki (Bethune-Baker, 1904)
  - Calliteara kikuchii (Matsumura, 1927)
  - Calliteara lunulata (Butler, 1887)
  - Calliteara melli (Collenette, 1934)
  - Calliteara multilineata (Swinhoe, 1917)
  - Calliteara polioleuca (Collenette, 1955)
  - Calliteara postfusca (Swinhoe, 1895)
  - Calliteara pseudabietis Butler, 1885
  - Calliteara pura (Lucas, 1892)
  - Calliteara saitonis (Matsumura, 1927)
  - Calliteara solitaria (Staudinger, 1887)
  - Calliteara subnigra (Bethune-Baker, 1904)
  - Calliteara subnigropunctata (Bethune-Baker, 1904)
  - Calliteara taiwana (Wileman, 1910)
  - Calliteara virginea (Oberthür, 1879)
  - Calliteara wandammena (Bethune-Baker, 1916)
  - Calliteara wolongensis (Chao, 1986)
