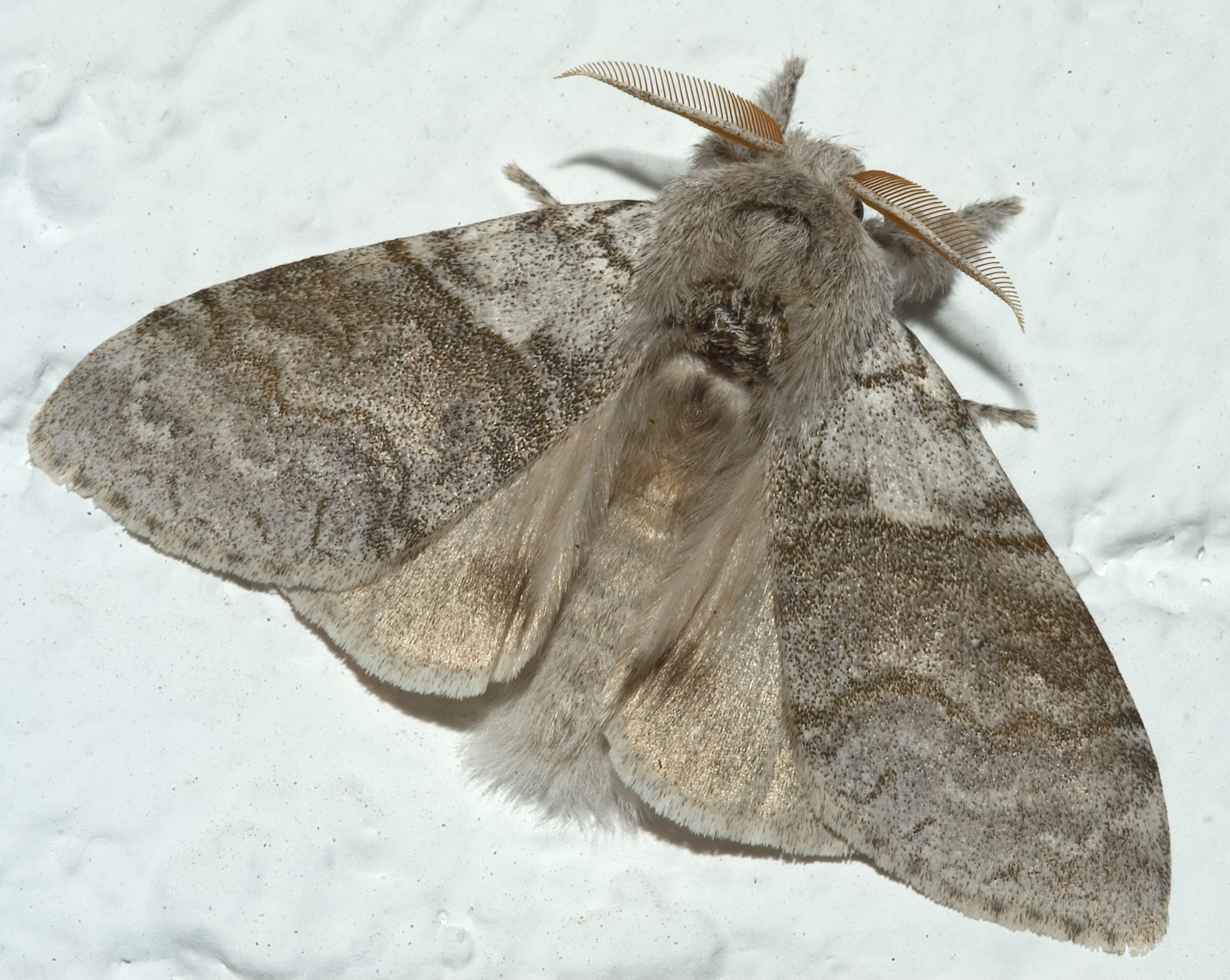

Scientific classification
- Kingdom: Animalia
- Phylum: Arthropoda
- Class: Insecta
- Order: Lepidoptera
- Superfamily: Noctuoidea
- Family: Erebidae
- Genus: Calliteara
- Species: C. pudibunda

Binomial name
- Calliteara pudibunda (Linnaeus, 1758)

Synonyms
- Phalaena pudibunda Linnaeus, 1758; Dasychira pudibunda (Linnaeus, 1758); Elkneria pudibunda (Linnaeus, 1758); .. pudipunda auct. [misspelling]

= Calliteara pudibunda =

Pale tussock

Species of moth

Calliteara pudibunda, the pale tussock, is a moth of the family Erebidae. The Dutch common name for the moth (Meriansborstel) comes from the butterfly and insect painter Maria Sibylla Merian. The species was first described by Carl Linnaeus in his 1758 10th edition of Systema Naturae. It is found in Asia and Europe.

== Technical description and variation ==
Calliteara pudibunda is a pest of European beech forests (Fagus sylvatica). The mix of tree species impacts the moths; they react very sensitively to the occurrence of a small portion of spruce trees within beech stands.

The wingspan is 40–60 mm. Female: Forewing greyish white dusted with dark, and bearing dark wavy transverse lines edged with pure white on the inner side. Hindwing white with indication of a dark submarginal band. Male: Forewing olive grey with black median area and darker indistinct slightly wavy transverse lines in the marginal and basal areas. Hindwing greyish yellow, with a transverse band which is slightly more distinct than in the female, and sometimes forms an elbowed anal. Form juglandis Hübner is divergent in the male, being distinguished by a greyish-white head and thorax (in typical specimens this is dark brown or only slightly lighter), as well as by a whitish basal area of the forewing. The median area is grey with blackish discocellular spot and marginal lines; hindwing with distinct dark submarginal band and discocellular spot. In the female the submarginal band of the hindwing is also more distinct than in typical specimens. Aberration concolor Staudinger has dark grey forewings, unicolorous or with only traces of transverse lines.

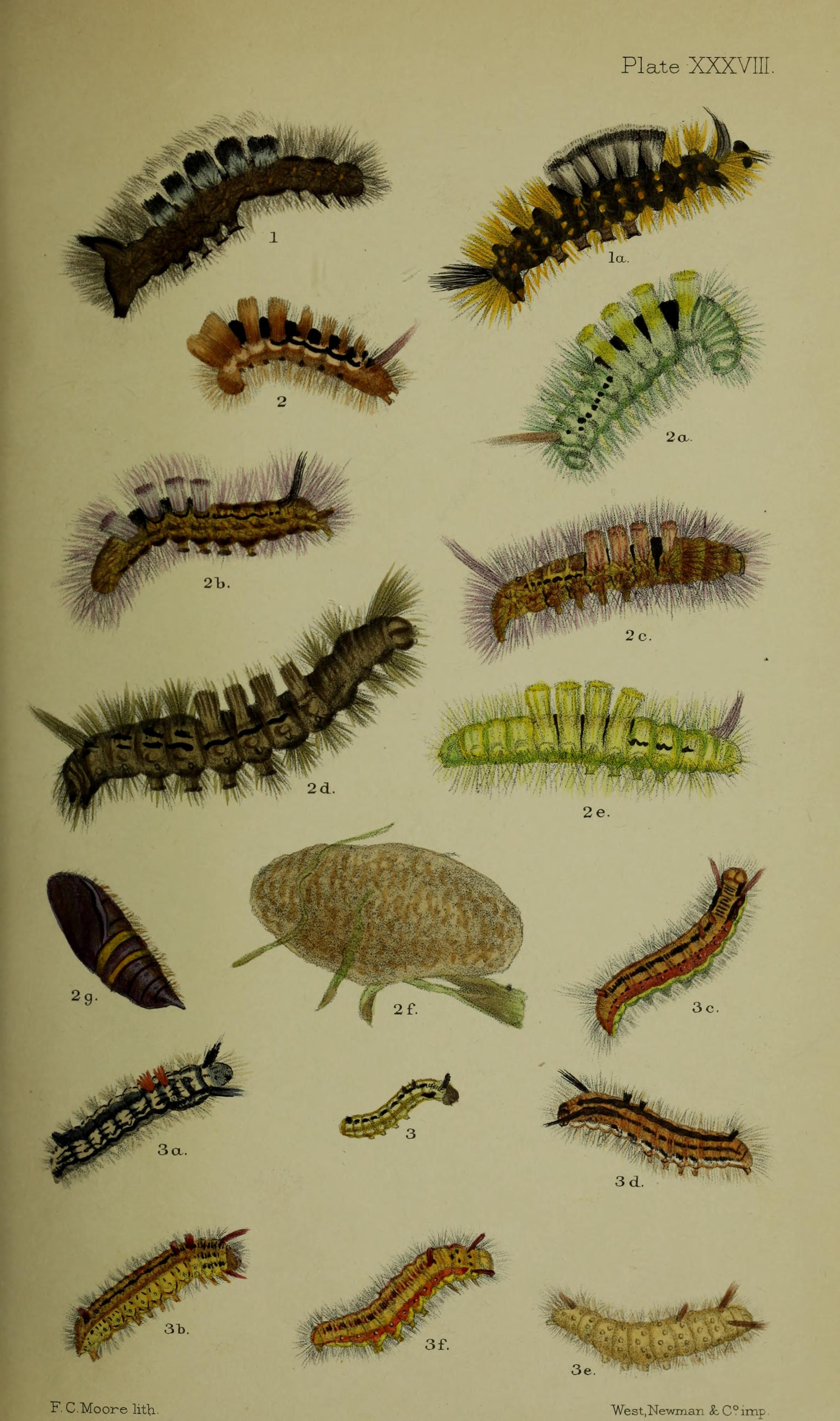
Fig.2a, 2b, 2c, 2d larvae after last moult; 2f cocoon; 2g pupa

== Biology ==
The moth flies from April to June.

Egg light yellowish brown with dark median spot. Larva usually light lemon yellow, but sometimes brownish yellow, violet or blackish grey, with deep black segmental incisions, lighter dorsal brushes and red or brown pencil on the 11th segment. The larvae feed on oak, beech, willow, birch, Prunus and Crataegus species. It was formerly a pest on hop plants in the English home counties, where it was known as the hop dog.

== Distribution ==
It is found in Europe, Anatolia, Caucasus, western Siberia, eastern Transbaikalia and the Amur basin in south-eastern Russia, Korea, China and northern Vietnam.

== Gallery ==
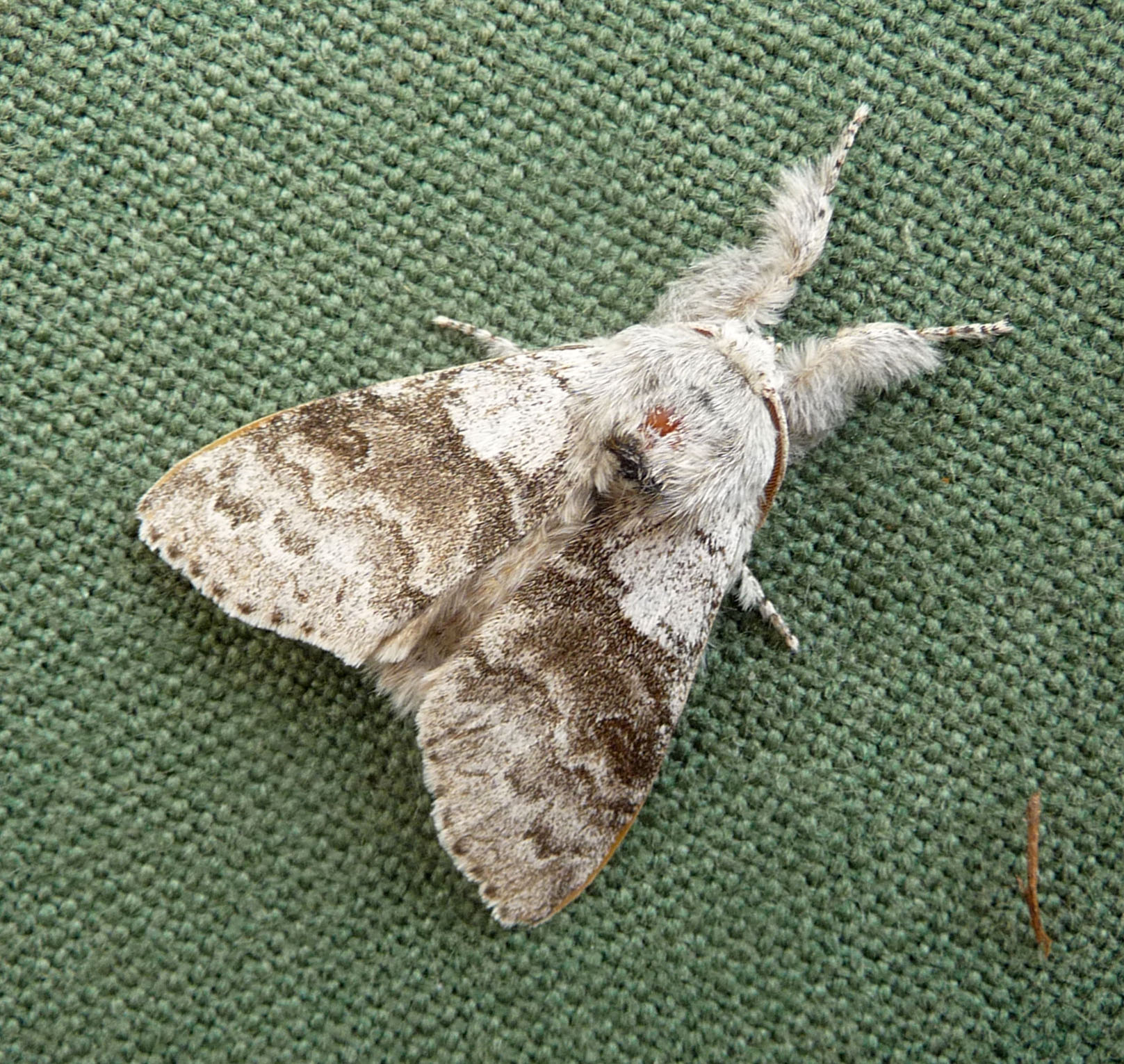
Imago (showing hairy legs)

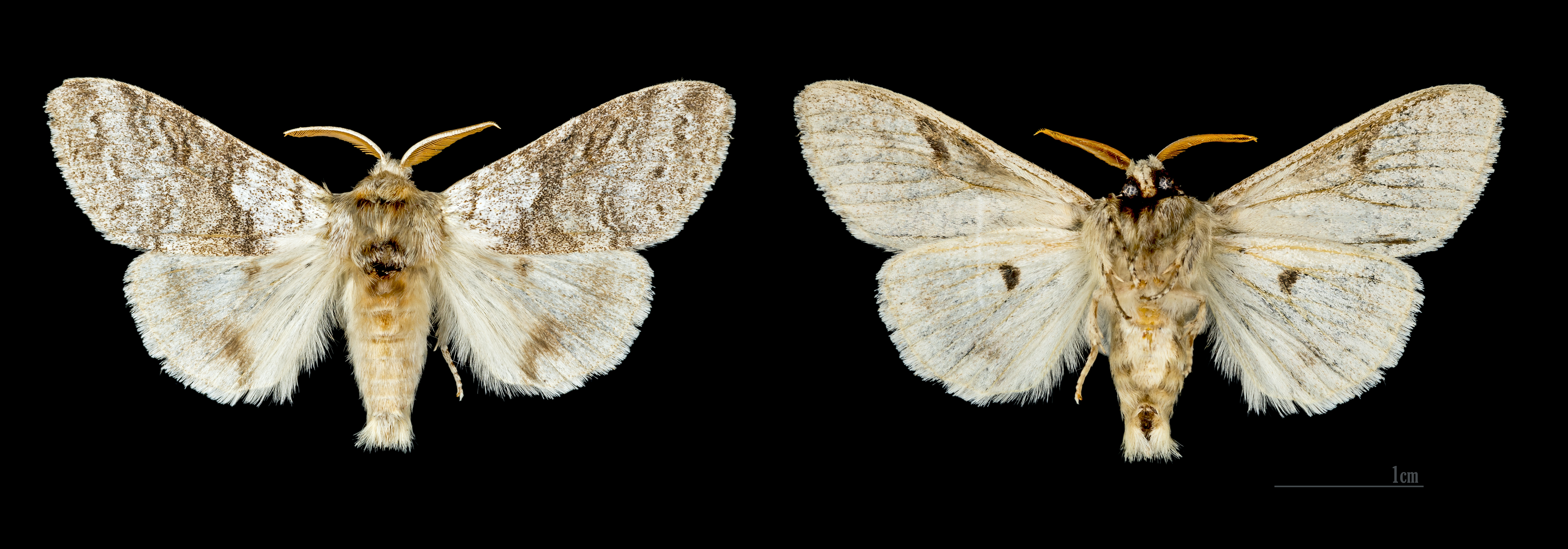
Mounted male

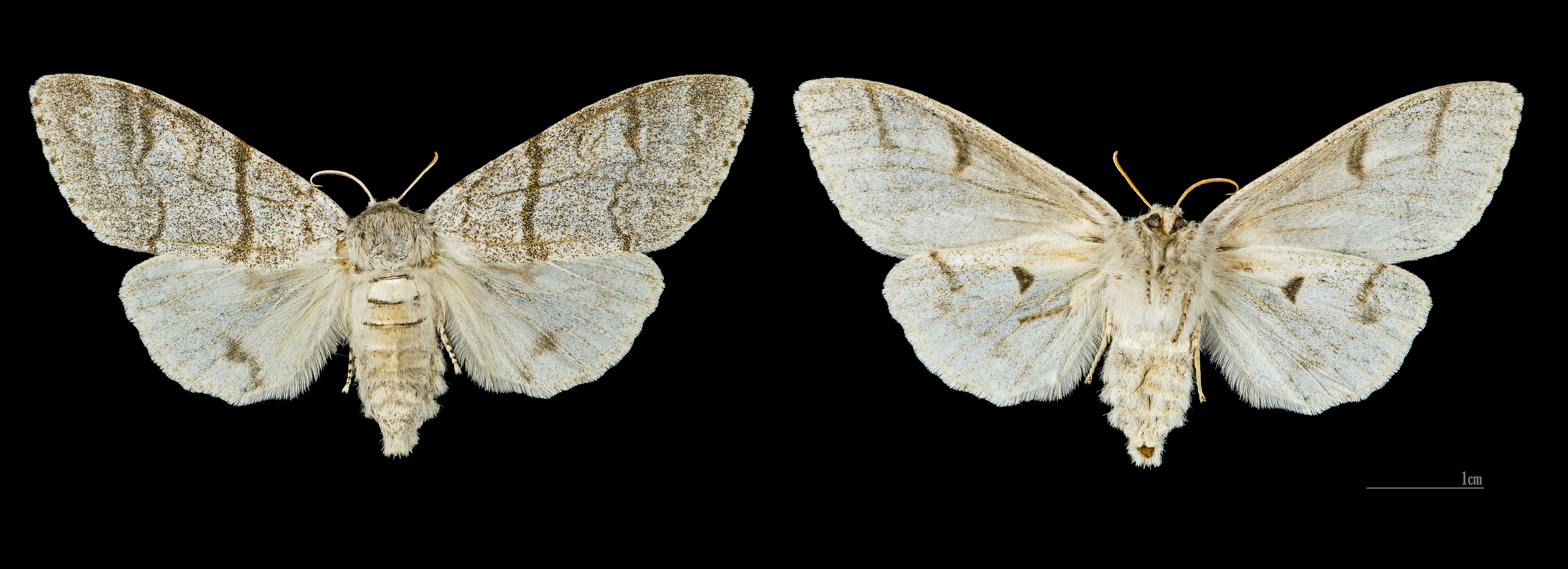
Mounted female

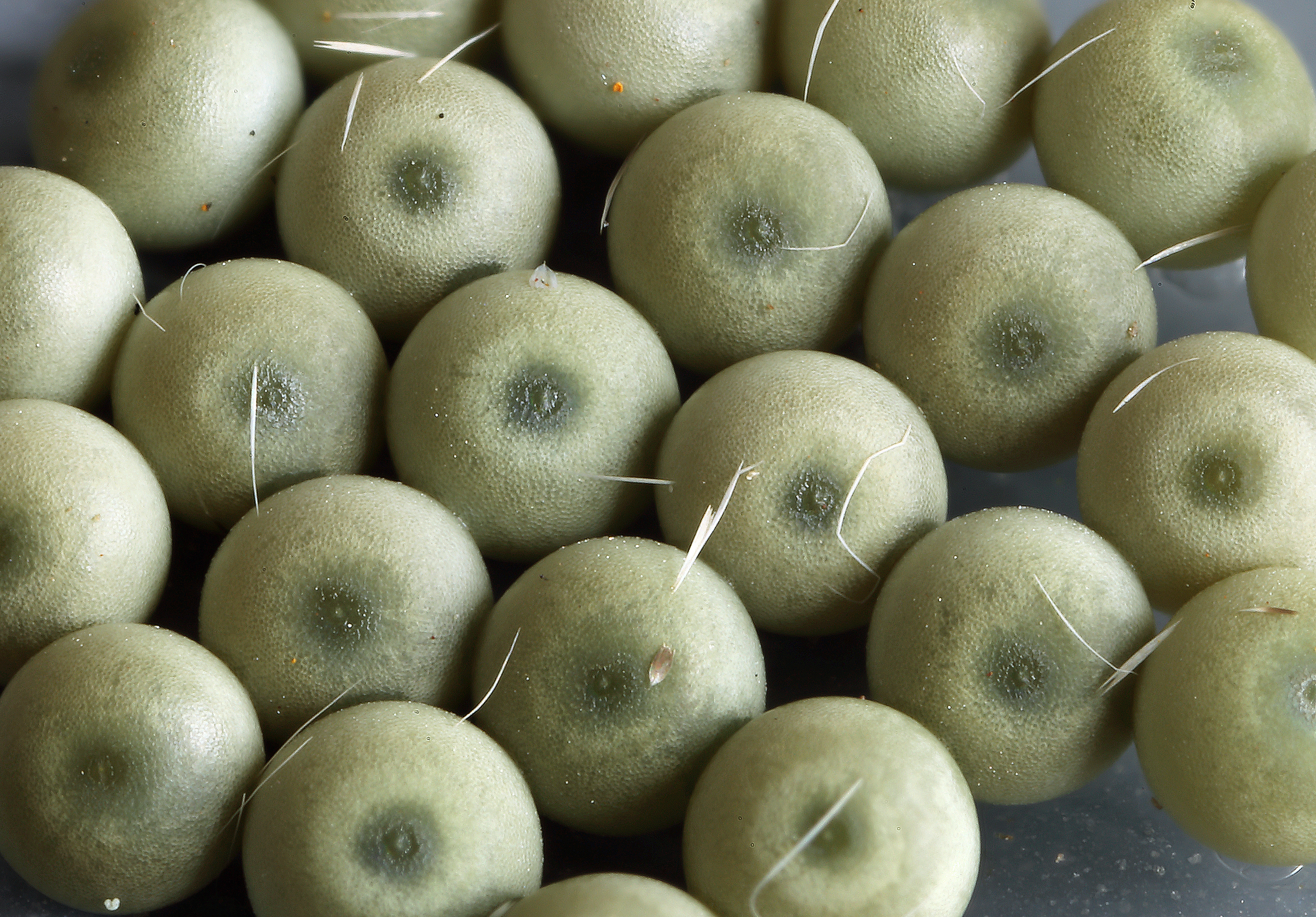
Eggs

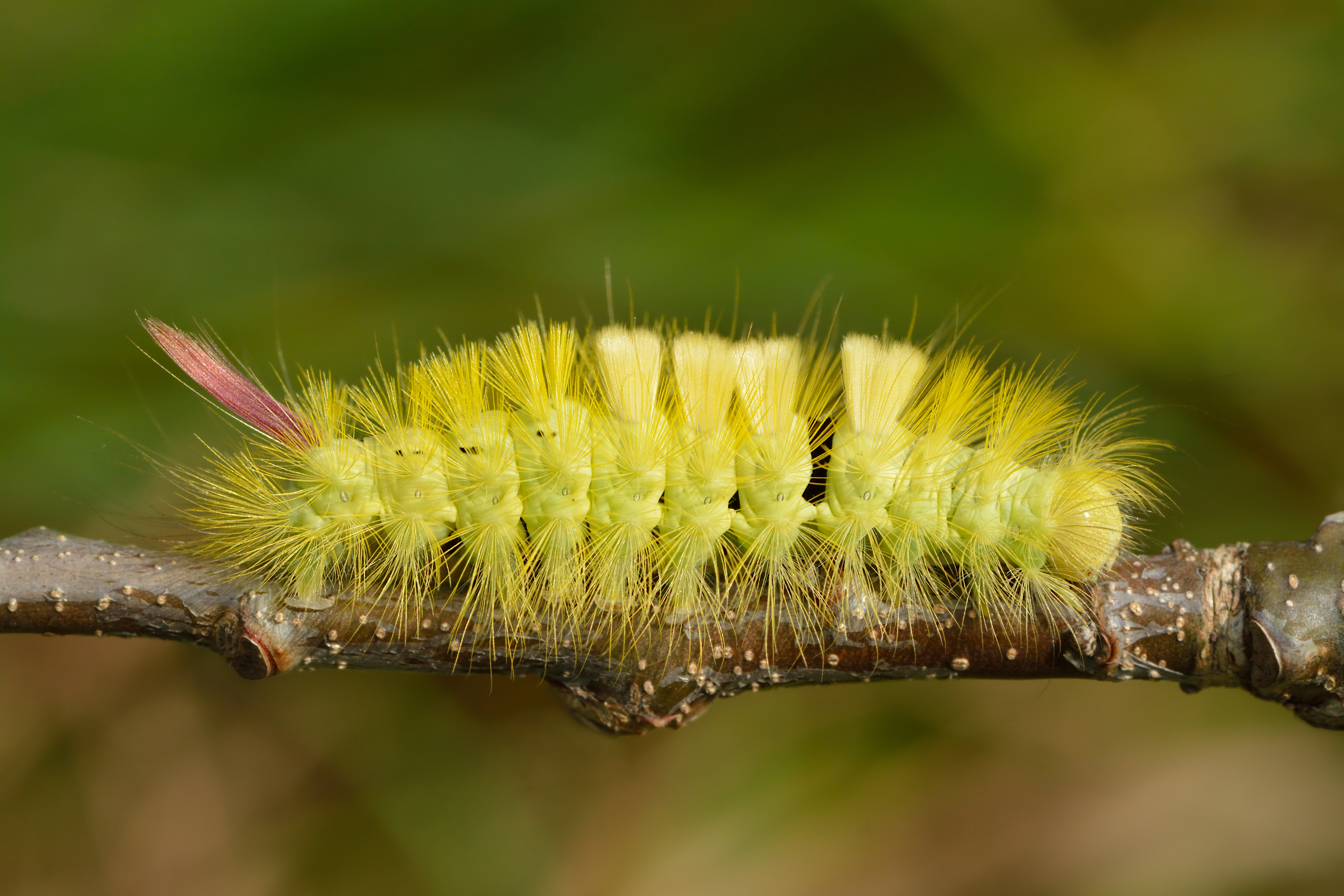
Caterpillar (yellow form)

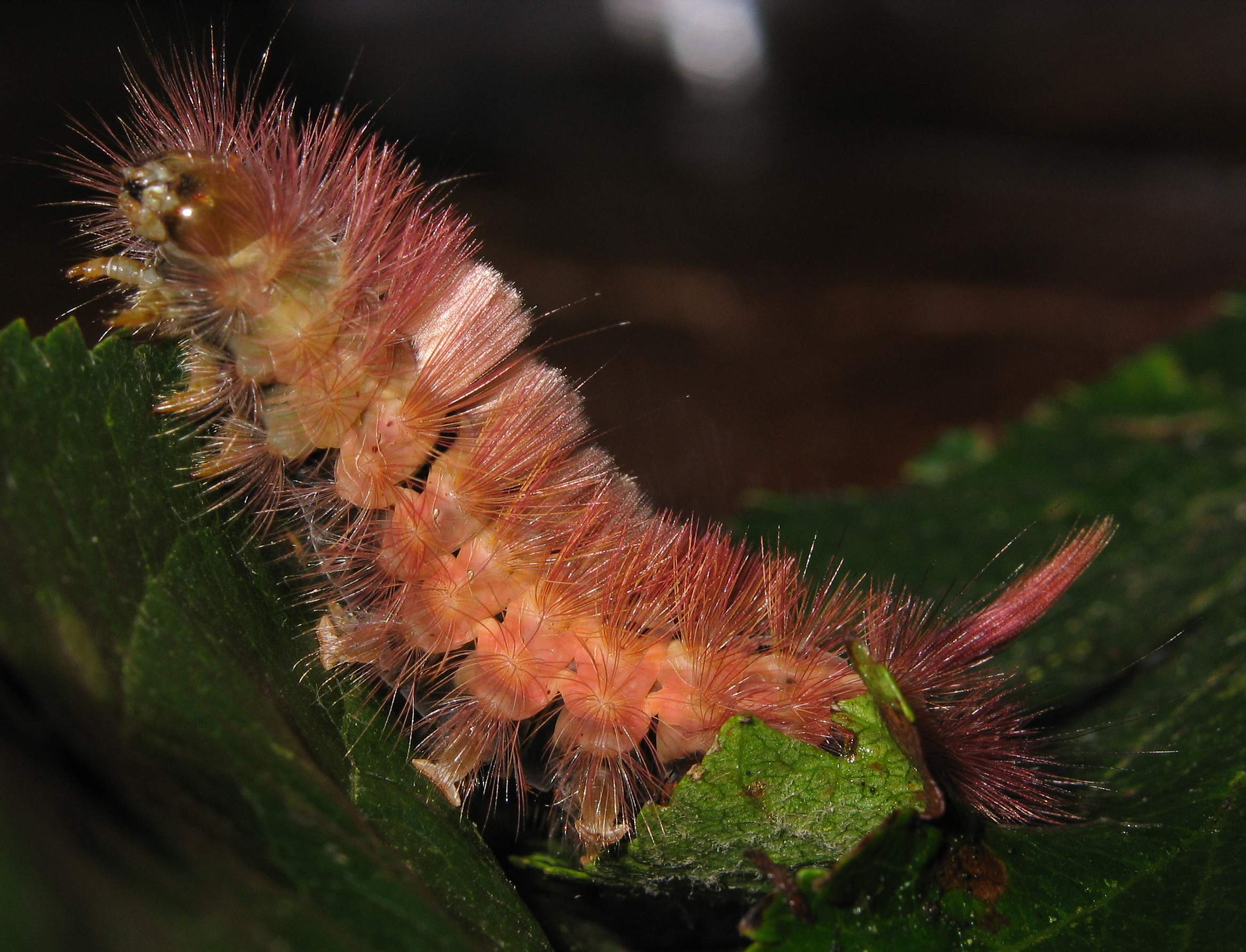
Caterpillar (brown form)

Calliteara pudibunda
