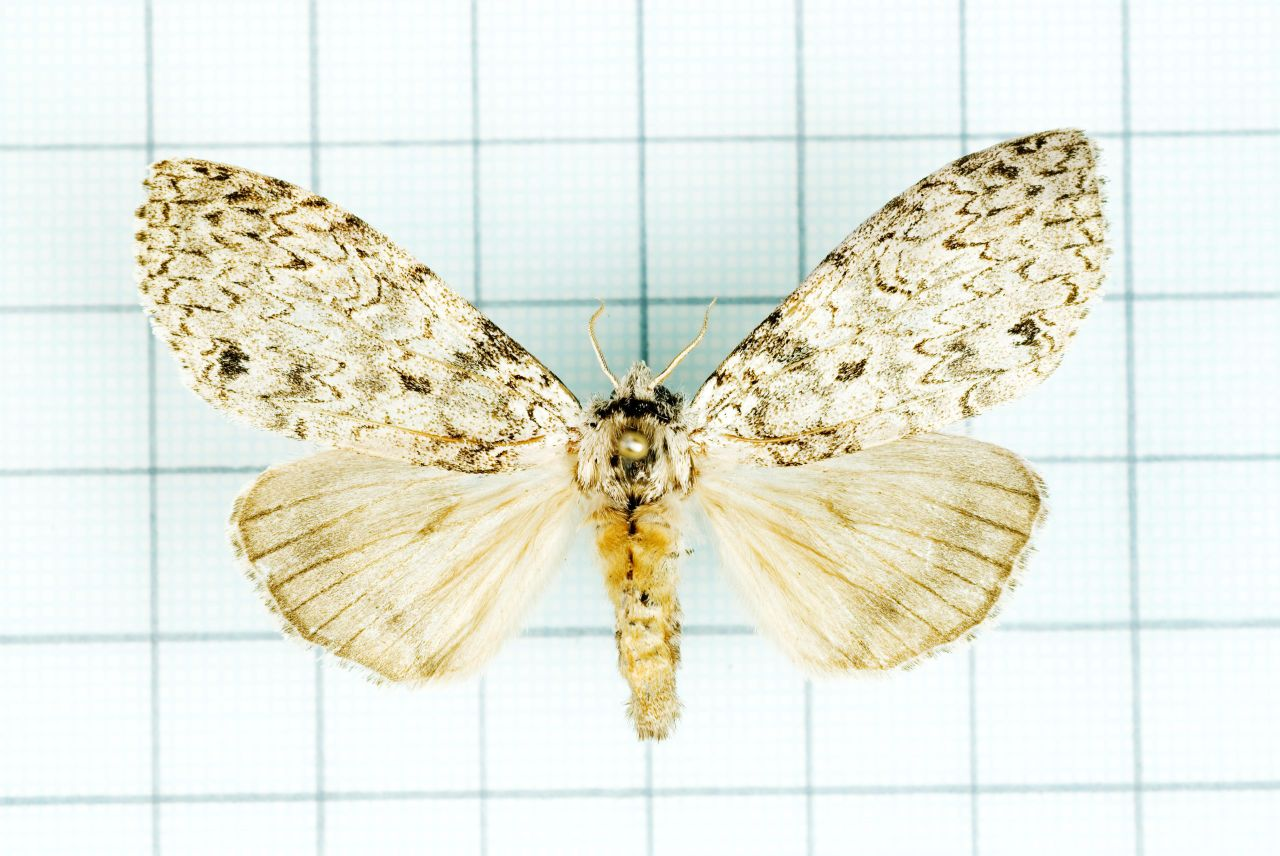

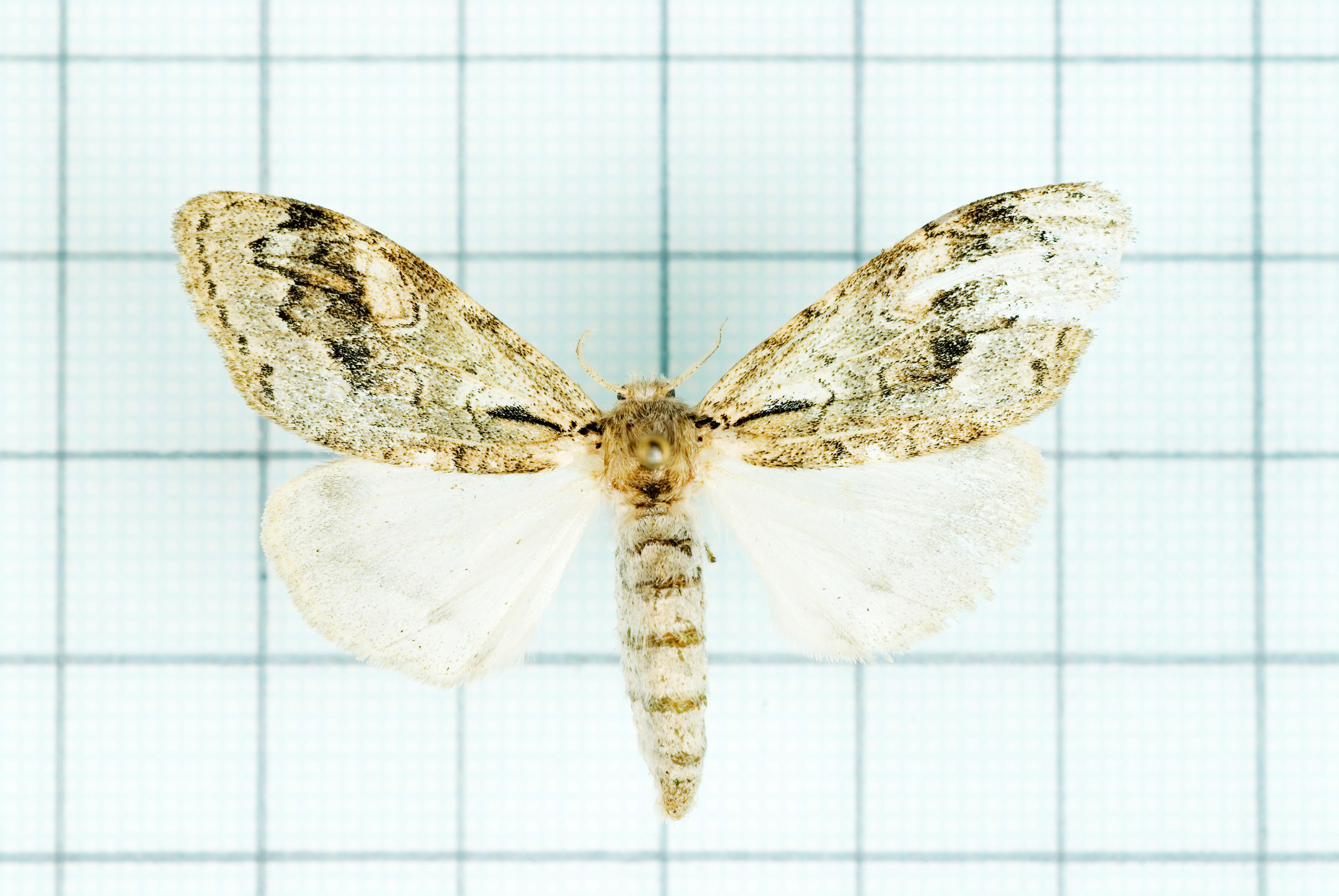

Scientific classification
- Domain: Eukaryota
- Kingdom: Animalia
- Phylum: Arthropoda
- Class: Insecta
- Order: Lepidoptera
- Superfamily: Noctuoidea
- Family: Erebidae
- Genus: Calliteara
- Species: C. kikuchii

Binomial name
- Calliteara kikuchii (Matsumura, 1927)

Synonyms
- Dasychira kikuchii Matsumura, 1927

= Calliteara kikuchii =

Species of moth

Calliteara kikuchii is a moth of the family Erebidae first described by Shōnen Matsumura in 1927. It is found in Taiwan.
