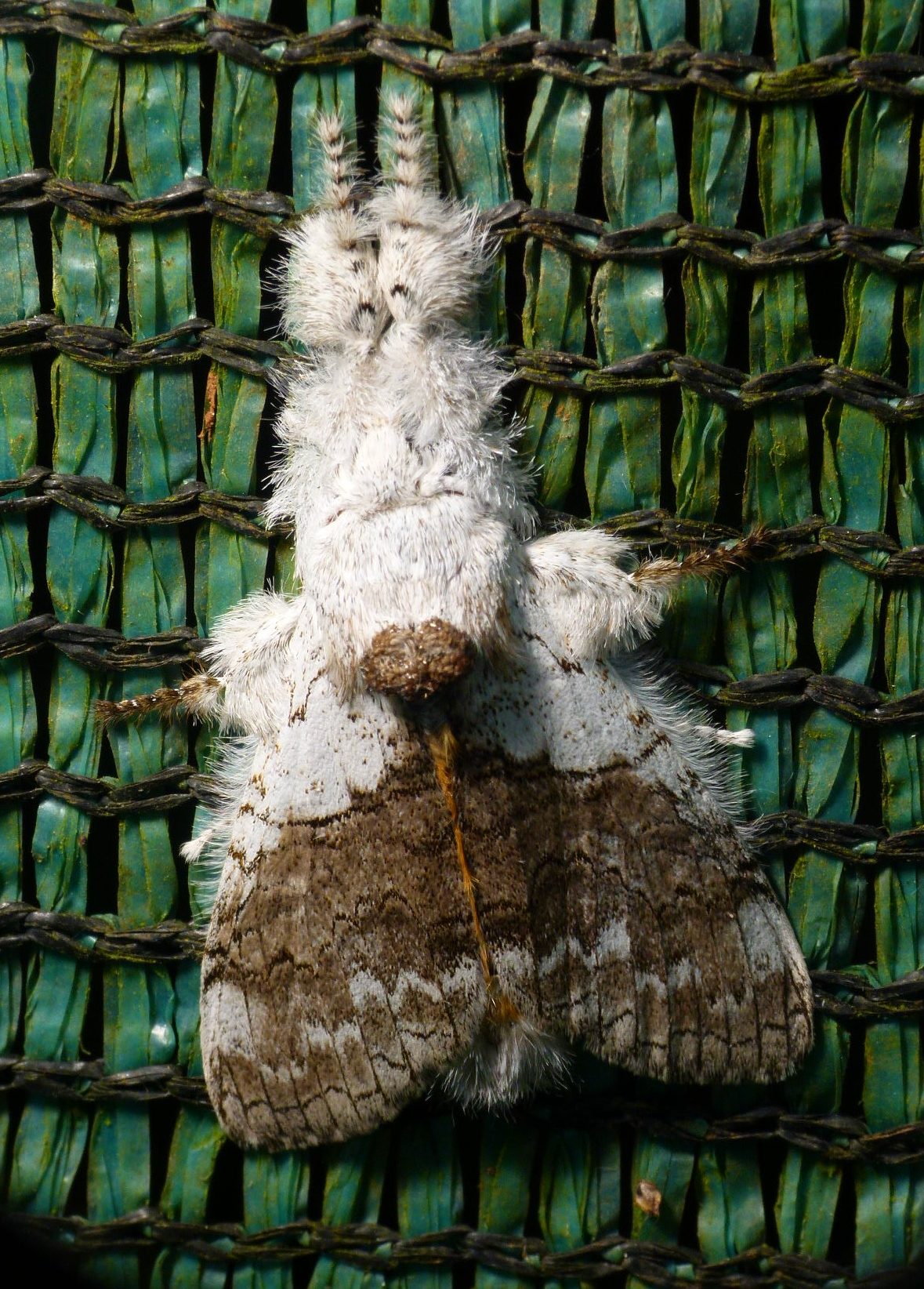
- From the Western Ghats

Scientific classification
- Domain: Eukaryota
- Kingdom: Animalia
- Phylum: Arthropoda
- Class: Insecta
- Order: Lepidoptera
- Superfamily: Noctuoidea
- Family: Erebidae
- Genus: Calliteara
- Species: C. grotei

Binomial name
- Calliteara grotei (Moore, 1859)

Synonyms
- Dasychira grotei Moore, 1859; Dasychira kausalia Moore, 1879; Dasychira nilgirica Hampson, 1891; Dasychira horishanella Matsumura, 1927; Dasychira atomariana Matsumura, 1927; Dasychira dehra Collenette, 1938

= Calliteara grotei =

Species of moth

Calliteara grotei is a species of moth of the family Erebidae. It is found in Asia in the Himalayas, southwestern India and in Southeast Asia.

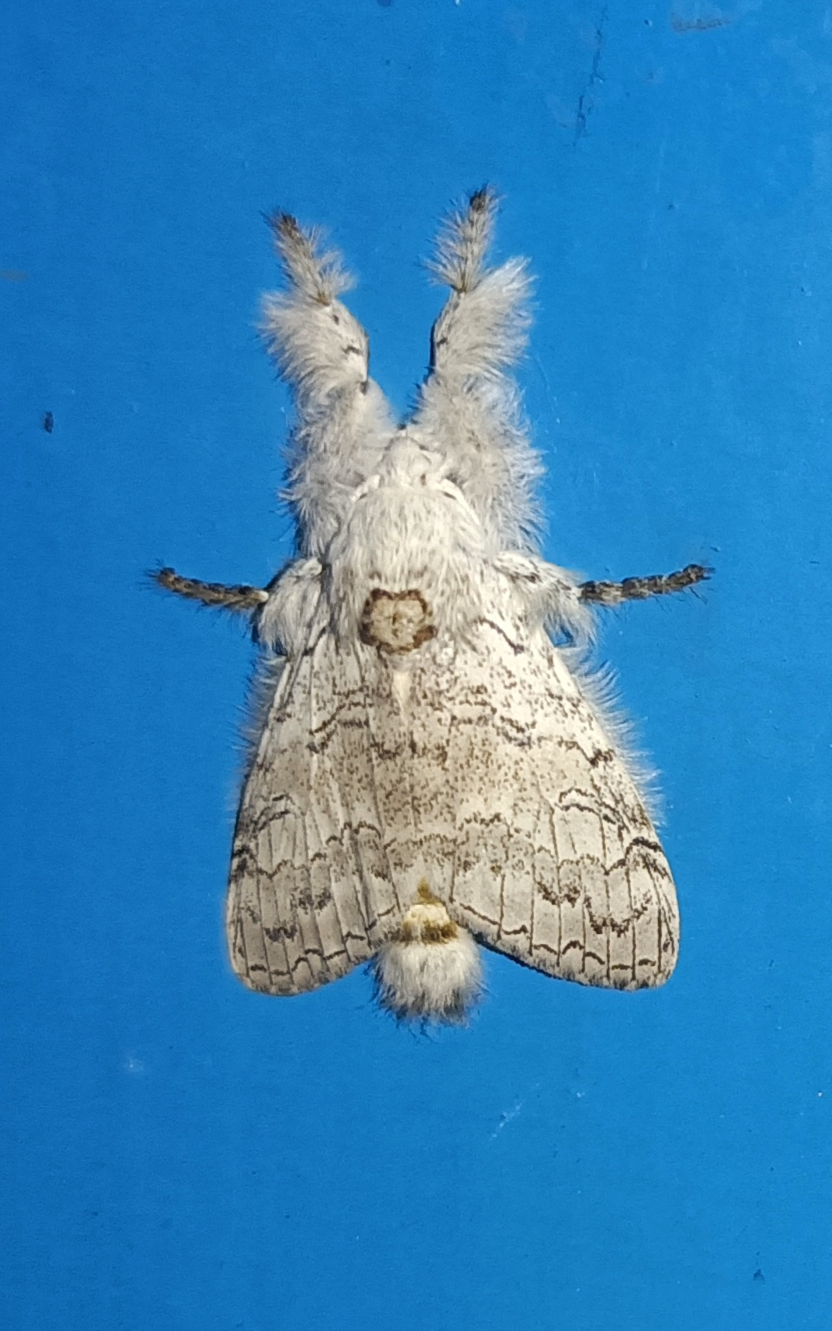
Moth,Calliteara grotei from Koottanad Palakkad Kerala India
