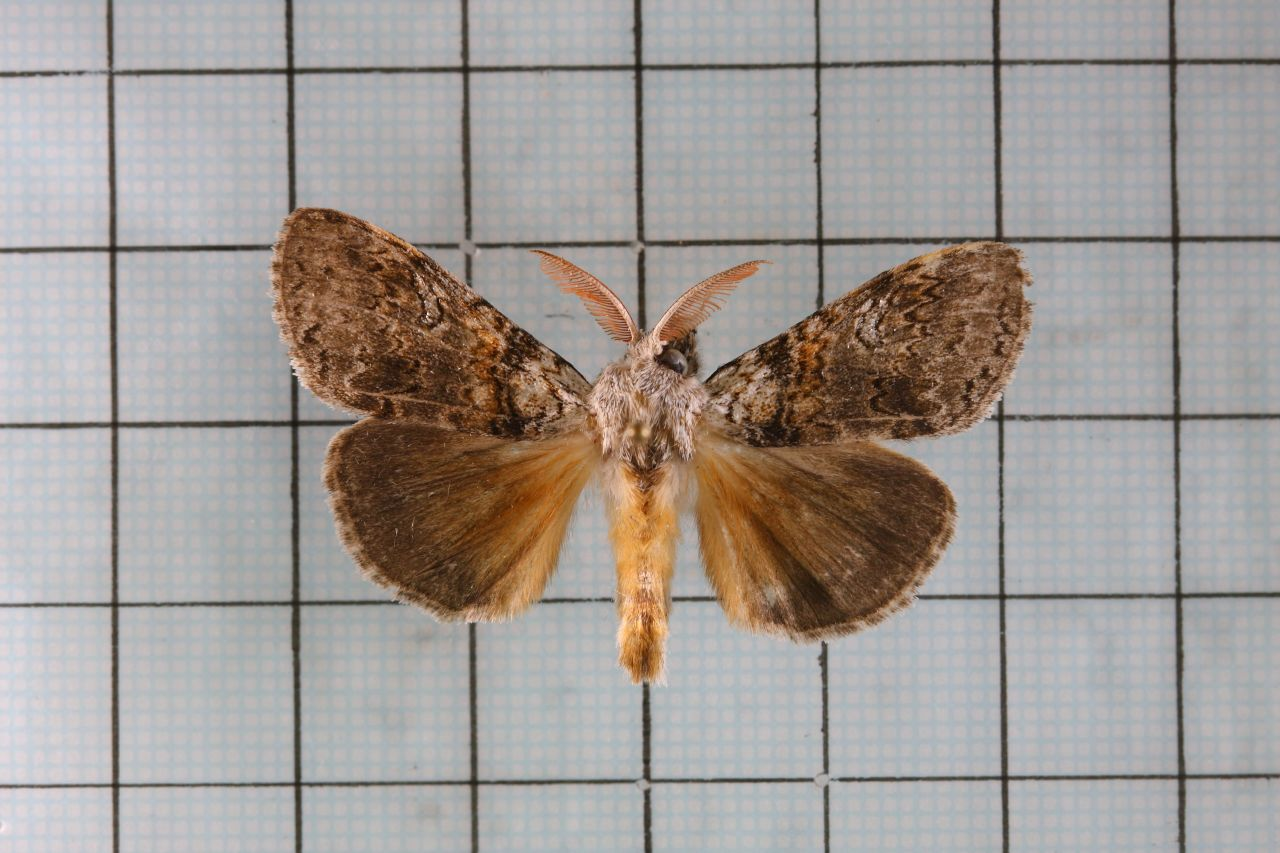

Scientific classification
- Domain: Eukaryota
- Kingdom: Animalia
- Phylum: Arthropoda
- Class: Insecta
- Order: Lepidoptera
- Superfamily: Noctuoidea
- Family: Erebidae
- Genus: Calliteara
- Species: C. arizana

Binomial name
- Calliteara arizana (Wileman, 1910)

Synonyms
- Dasychira arizana Wileman, 1910; Dasychira albibasalis Matsumura, 1931; Dasychira matsumurae Bryk, 1935

= Calliteara arizana =

Species of moth

Calliteara arizana is a moth of the family Erebidae first described by Alfred Ernest Wileman in 1910. It is found in Taiwan.
