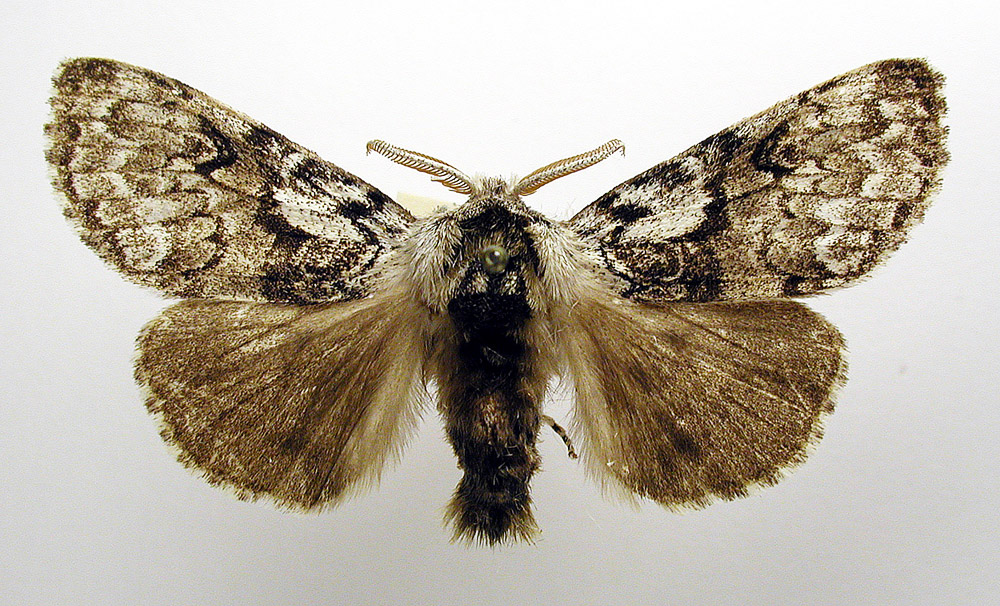

Scientific classification
- Domain: Eukaryota
- Kingdom: Animalia
- Phylum: Arthropoda
- Class: Insecta
- Order: Lepidoptera
- Superfamily: Noctuoidea
- Family: Erebidae
- Genus: Calliteara
- Species: C. abietis

Binomial name
- Calliteara abietis (Denis & Schiffermüller, 1775)

Synonyms
- Bombyx abietis Denis & Schiffermüller, 1775; Dicallomera abietis (Denis & Schiffermüller, 1775)

= Calliteara abietis =

Species of moth

Calliteara abietis is a moth of the family Erebidae. It is found from northern and central Europe, through Russia to Japan.

The wingspan is 35–52 mm.

The larvae feed on Picea abies, Larix sibirica and Juniperus communis.

== Subspecies ==
- Calliteara abietis abietis
- Calliteara abietis argentata (Japan,…)
