= Calliteara nandarivatu =

Scientific classification
- Domain: Eukaryota
- Kingdom: Animalia
- Phylum: Arthropoda
- Class: Insecta
- Order: Lepidoptera
- Superfamily: Noctuoidea
- Family: Erebidae
- Genus: Calliteara
- Species: C. nandarivatu

Binomial name
- Calliteara nandarivatu (Robinson, 1968)

Synonyms
- Dasychira nandarivatu Robinson, 1968; Calliteara nandarivatus (Robinson, 1968) (Misspelling)

Species of moth

Calliteara nandarivatu is a moth of the subfamily Lymantriinae. It was described by Robinson in 1968. It is found on Fiji.
