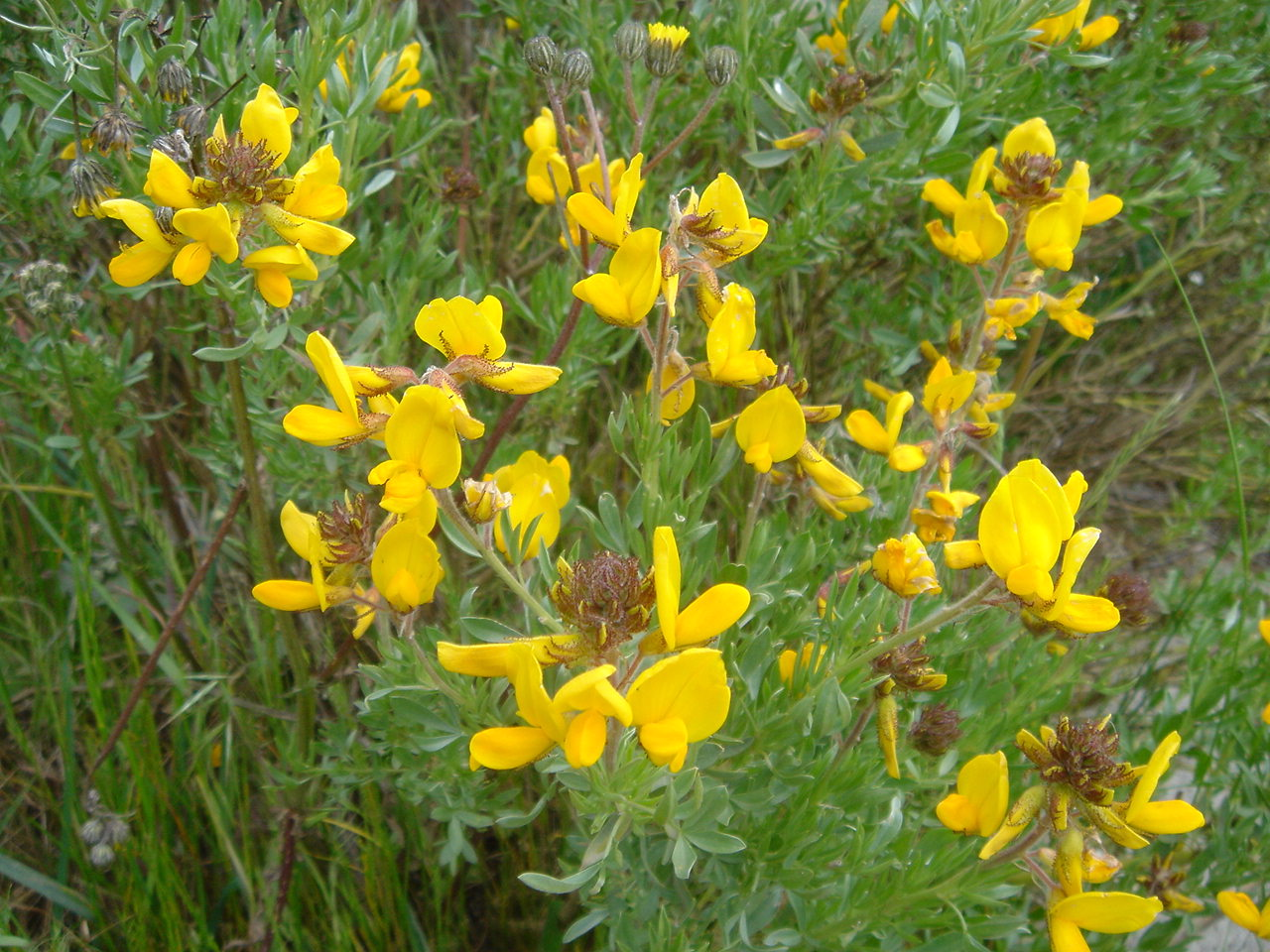

Scientific classification
- Kingdom: Plantae
- Clade: Tracheophytes
- Clade: Angiosperms
- Clade: Eudicots
- Clade: Rosids
- Order: Fabales
- Family: Fabaceae
- Subfamily: Faboideae
- Genus: Adenocarpus
- Species: A. hispanicus

Binomial name
- Adenocarpus hispanicus (Lam.) DC.

Synonyms
- Adenocarpus argyrophyllus (Rivas Goday) Caball.

= Adenocarpus hispanicus =

Species of legume

Adenocarpus hispanicus is a species of flowering plant in the Faboideae subfamily that is endemic to the Iberian Peninsula in Spain and Portugal. It is 4 metres (13 ft) high with its leaves being 25–7.5 millimetres (0.98–0.30 in) long.
