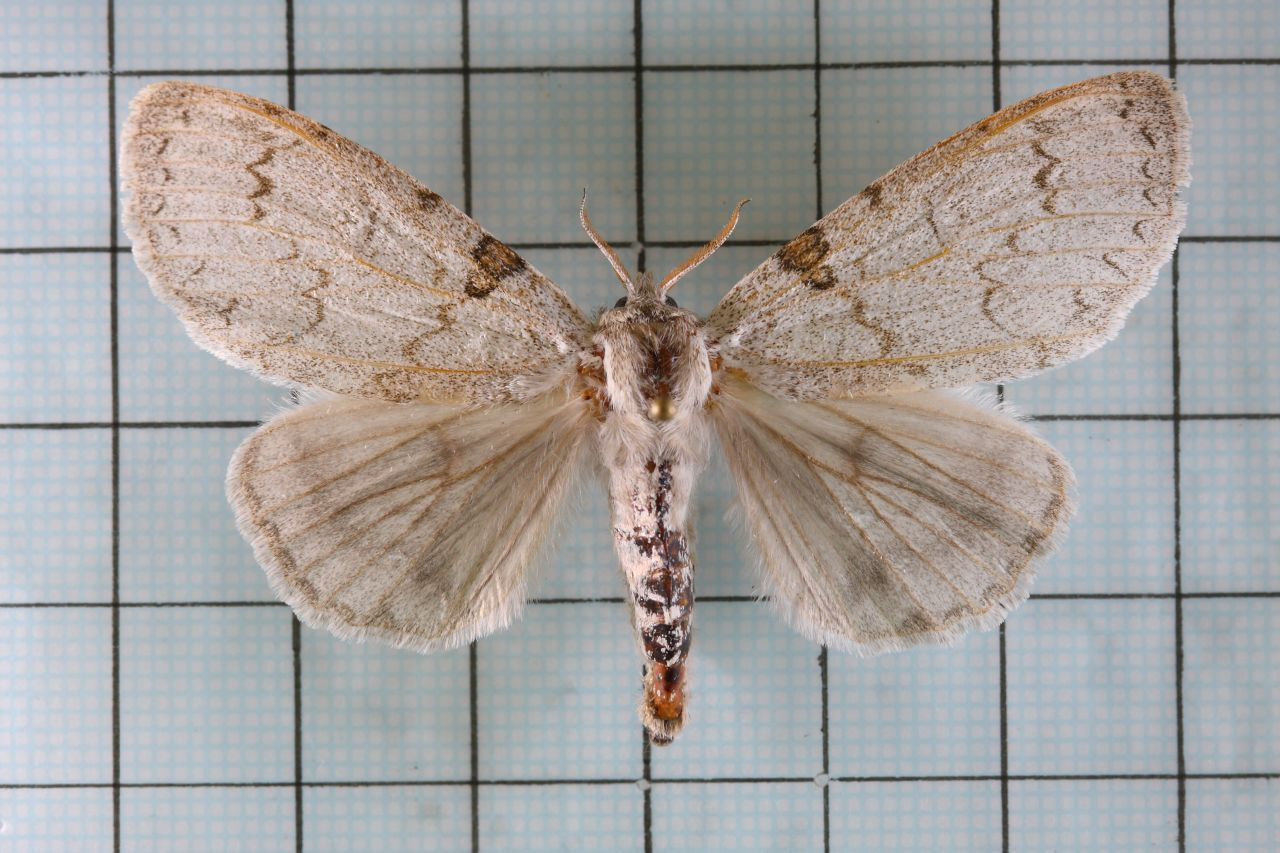
- Calliteara lunulata takamukuana

Scientific classification
- Domain: Eukaryota
- Kingdom: Animalia
- Phylum: Arthropoda
- Class: Insecta
- Order: Lepidoptera
- Superfamily: Noctuoidea
- Family: Erebidae
- Genus: Calliteara
- Species: C. lunulata

Binomial name
- Calliteara lunulata (Butler, 1887)

Synonyms
- Dasychira lunulata Butler, 1887; Dasychira acronycta Oberthur, 1880; Dasychira solitaria Staudinger, 1887; Dasychira takamukuana Matsumura, 1927

= Calliteara lunulata =

Species of moth

Calliteara lunulata is a moth of the family Erebidae. It is found in the Russian Far East, Japan, China and Taiwan.

The wingspan is 51–55 mm for males and 65–70 mm for females. Adults are on wing from May to June and from July to August in two generations per year.

The larvae feed on the leaves of various trees, including Quercus and Castanea species.

== Subspecies ==
- Calliteara lunulata lunulata
- Calliteara lunulata takamukuana (Matsumura, 1927) (Taiwan)
