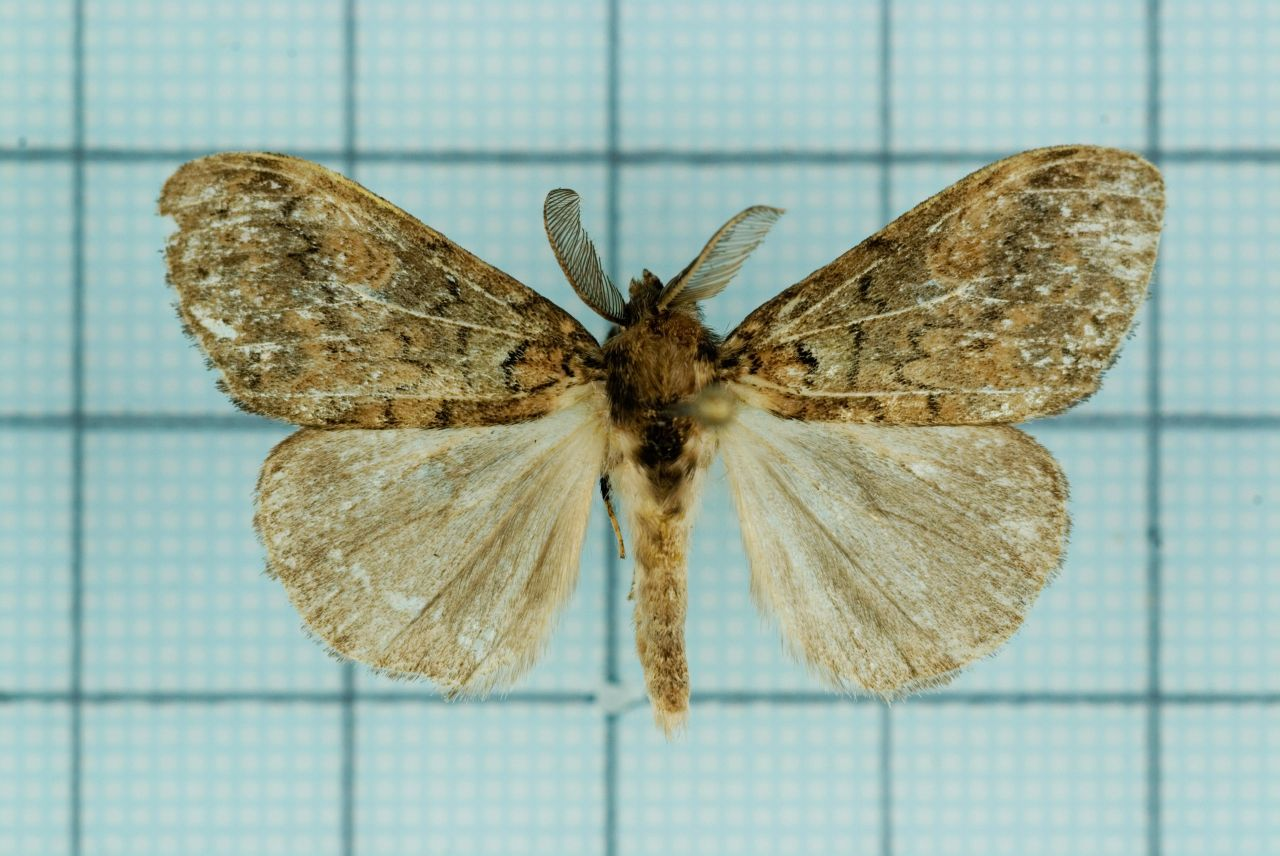

Scientific classification
- Domain: Eukaryota
- Kingdom: Animalia
- Phylum: Arthropoda
- Class: Insecta
- Order: Lepidoptera
- Superfamily: Noctuoidea
- Family: Erebidae
- Genus: Calliteara
- Species: C. baibarana

Binomial name
- Calliteara baibarana (Matsumura, 1927)

Synonyms
- Dasychira baibarana Matsumura, 1927

= Calliteara baibarana =

Species of moth

Calliteara baibarana is a moth of the subfamily Lymantriinae first described by Shōnen Matsumura in 1927. It is found in Taiwan.
