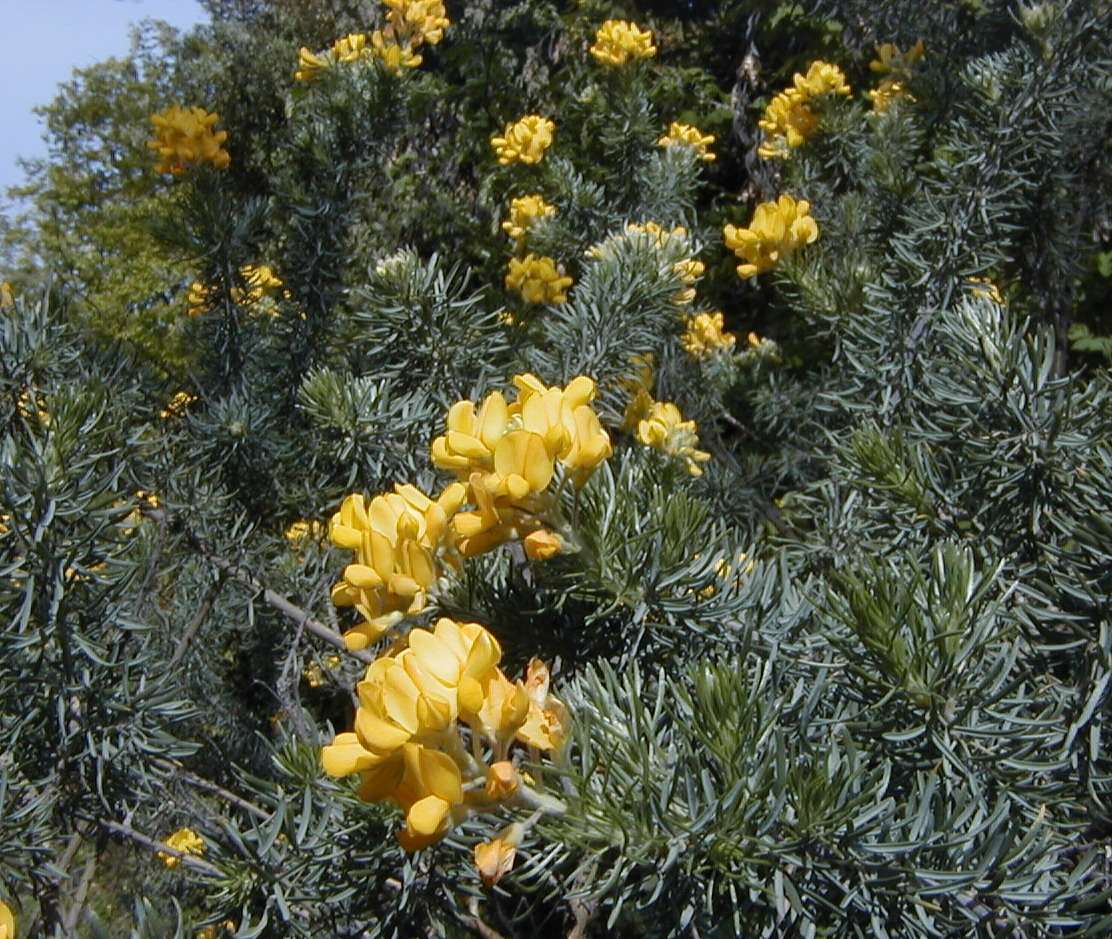

Scientific classification
- Kingdom: Plantae
- Clade: Tracheophytes
- Clade: Angiosperms
- Clade: Eudicots
- Clade: Rosids
- Order: Fabales
- Family: Fabaceae
- Subfamily: Faboideae
- Genus: Adenocarpus
- Species: A. decorticans

Binomial name
- Adenocarpus decorticans Boiss. (1838)

Synonyms
- Adenocarpus boissieri Webb (1838); Adenocarpus decorticans var. planifolius Maire (1931); Adenocarpus decorticans subsp. speciosus (Pomel) Rivas Mart. & Belmonte (1989); Adenocarpus decorticans var. speciosus (Pomel) Batt. (1889); Adenocarpus speciosus Pomel (1874)

= Adenocarpus decorticans =

Species of plant in the legume family

Adenocarpus decorticans, also known as silver broom, is a species of flowering plant in the Faboideae subfamily which is native to the Sierra Nevada in southern Spain, the Rif mountains of Morocco, and the Atlas Mountains of Algeria. The species have lemon-coloured flowers.

Listed by the English horticulturalist A.D. Webster in his 1893 Hardy Ornamental Flowering Trees and Shrubs as introduced to Britain only a decade earlier in 1883, Webster had this to say: "This little known hardy shrub, a native of the Sierra Nevada mountains, in Spain, is one of great beauty, and well worthy of extended culture. The flowers are produced abundantly, and are of a bright yellow colour, resembling those of our common Broom, to which family it is nearly allied. Peaty soil suits it well, and repeated trials have clearly proved that it is hardy, at least in the South of England."
