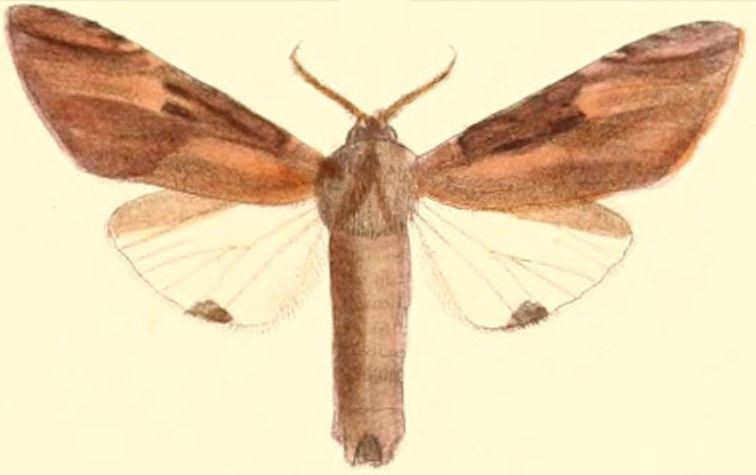

Scientific classification
- Domain: Eukaryota
- Kingdom: Animalia
- Phylum: Arthropoda
- Class: Insecta
- Order: Lepidoptera
- Superfamily: Noctuoidea
- Family: Erebidae
- Genus: Calliteara
- Species: C. strigata

Binomial name
- Calliteara strigata (Moore, 1879)

Synonyms
- Dasychira strigata Moore, 1879; Dasychira niveosparsa Butler, 1881; Dasychira cordata Holloway, 1976; Orgyia strigata Swinhoe, 1923

= Calliteara strigata =

Species of moth

Calliteara strigata is a moth of the family Erebidae first described by Frederic Moore in 1879.

== Distribution ==
It is found in India, Thailand, Malaysia Sundaland, Brunei, China and Vietnam.
