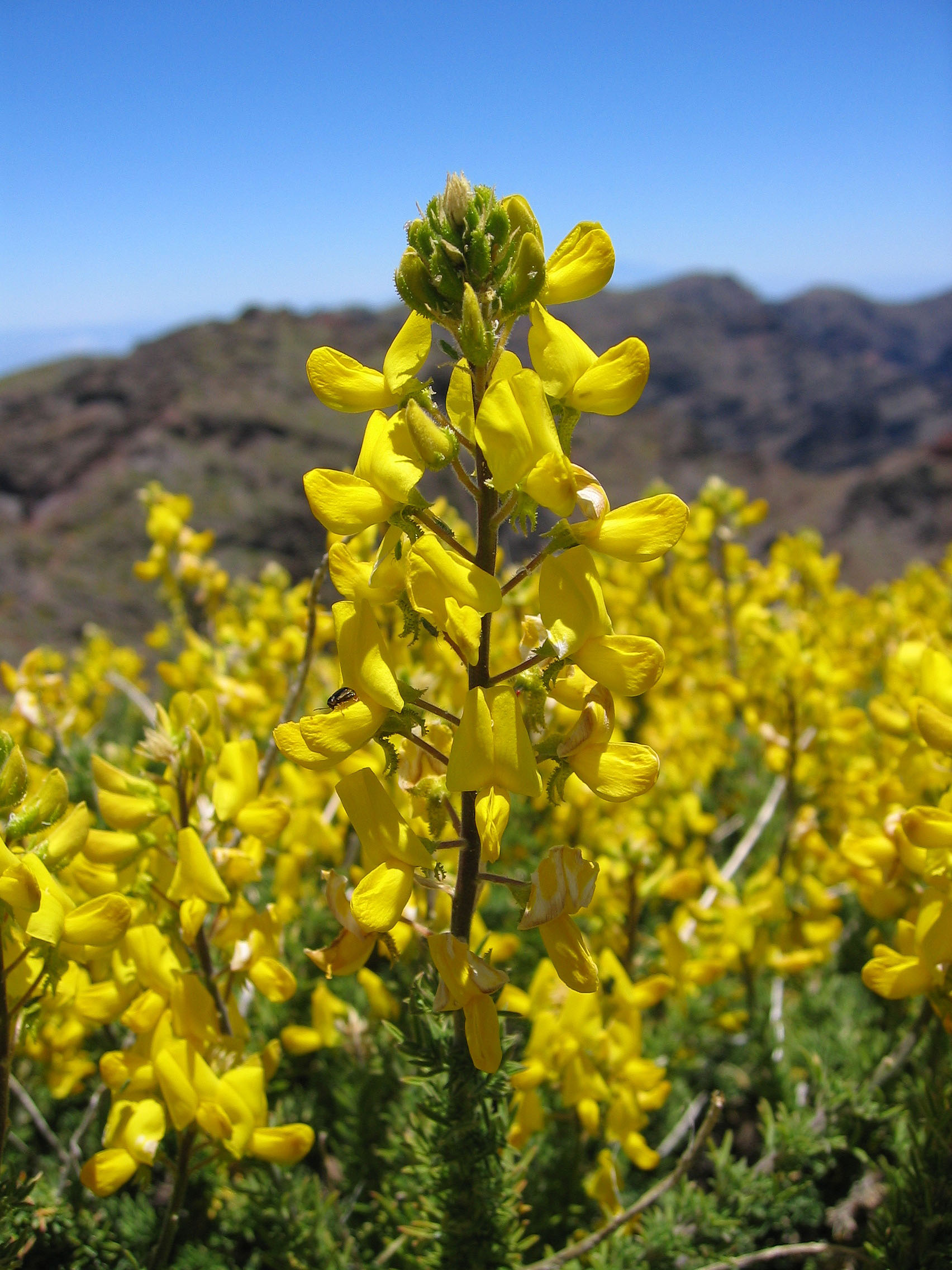
- Adenocarpus viscosus

Scientific classification
- Kingdom: Plantae
- Clade: Tracheophytes
- Clade: Angiosperms
- Clade: Eudicots
- Clade: Rosids
- Order: Fabales
- Family: Fabaceae
- Subfamily: Faboideae
- Tribe: Genisteae
- Genus: Adenocarpus; DC.

Species
- 16–29; see text

= Adenocarpus =

Genus of legumes

Adenocarpus is a genus of flowering plants in the family Fabaceae. It belongs to the subfamily Faboideae. The plants are broom-like shrubs with bright yellow flowers. The genus is native to the Mediterranean Basin and sub-Saharan Africa, but finds its highest diversity in Northwest Africa (Morocco, Algeria, and the Canary Islands) and the Iberian Peninsula.

== Species ==
Adenocarpus comprises the following species:

- Adenocarpus anagyrifolius Coss. & Balansa
- Adenocarpus artemisiifolius Jahand. et al.
- Adenocarpus bacquei Batt. & Pit.
- Adenocarpus battandieri (Maire) Talavera
- Adenocarpus boudyi Batt. & Maire
- Adenocarpus cincinnatus (Ball) Maire
- Adenocarpus complicatus (L.) Gay
  - subsp. bracteatus (Font Quer & Pau) Talavera & P. E. Gibbs
  - subsp. complicatus (L.) Gay
  - subsp. nainii (Maire) P. E. Gibbs
- Adenocarpus decorticans Boiss.
- Adenocarpus faurei Maire
- Adenocarpus foliolosus (Aiton) DC.
- Adenocarpus hispanicus (Lam.) DC.
- Adenocarpus mannii (Hook. f.) Hook. f.
- Adenocarpus ombriosus Ceballo & Ortuno
- Adenocarpus telonensis (Loisel.) DC.
- Adenocarpus umbellatus Batt.
- Adenocarpus viscosus (Willd.) Webb & Berthel.

== Species names with uncertain taxonomic status ==
The status of the following species is unresolved:

- Adenocarpus aureus (Cav.) Pau
- Adenocarpus bivonii (C.Presl) C.Presl
- Adenocarpus brutius Brullo & De Marco & Siracusa
- Adenocarpus complicatus J. Gay
- Adenocarpus desertorum Castrov.
- Adenocarpus divaricatus Sweet
- Adenocarpus divaricatus (L'Hér.) Boiss.
- Adenocarpus lainzii (Castrov.) Castrov.
- Adenocarpus rodriguezi Sennen & Mauricio
- Adenocarpus samniticus Brullo & De Marco & Siracusa
- Adenocarpus subdecorticans Humbert & Maire
- Adenocarpus tenoreanus Brullo, Gangale & Uzunov
- Adenocarpus vallisoletanus Sennen & Pau
