= Calliteara flavobrunnea =

Scientific classification
- Domain: Eukaryota
- Kingdom: Animalia
- Phylum: Arthropoda
- Class: Insecta
- Order: Lepidoptera
- Superfamily: Noctuoidea
- Family: Erebidae
- Genus: Calliteara
- Species: C. flavobrunnea

Binomial name
- Calliteara flavobrunnea (Robinson, 1969)

Synonyms
- Dasychira flavobrunnea Robinson, 1969

Species of moth

Calliteara flavobrunnea is a moth of the family Erebidae. It was described by Robinson in 1969. It is found on Fiji.
