= Ortuño =

Ortuño or Ortuno is a Spanish surname. Notable people with this surname include:

- Alfredo Ortuño (born 1991), Spanish footballer
- Alfonso Ortuño (1925-2011), Spanish impressionist painter
- Alfonso Ortuño Salar (born 1942), Spanish painter, illustrator & cartoonist
- Alicia Ortuño (born 1976), Spanish tennis player
- Antonio Ortuño (born 1976), Mexican novelist and short story writer
- Catalino Duarte Ortuño (born 1970), Mexican politician
- Fernando Ortuño (1945–2015), Spanish footballer
- Isabel Ortuño (born 1982), Spanish handballer
- Jesús Rodríguez Ortuño (born 1998), Spanish footballer
- Juanto Ortuño (born 1992), Spanish footballer
- Maria de los Angeles Rozalen Ortuno (born 1986), Spanish singer songwriter
- Rene Barrientos Ortuno (1919–1969), Bolivian military officer, president of Bolivia
- Sergio Ortuño (born 1999), Spanish footballer
- Teresa Ortuño Gurza (born 1957), Mexican politician
- Valeria Ortuño (born 1998), Mexican racewalker
- Washington Ortuño (1928–1973), Uruguayan footballer
