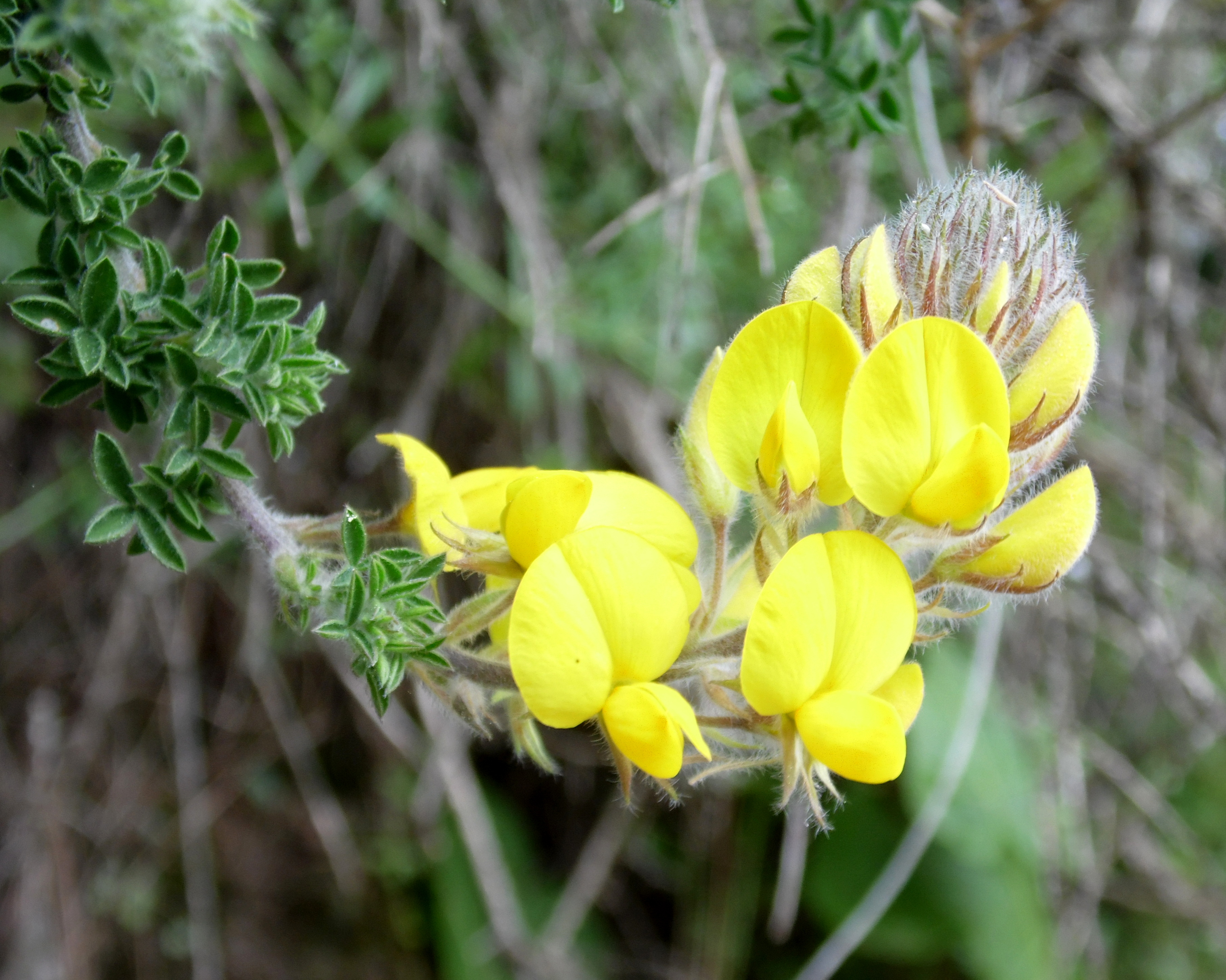

Scientific classification
- Kingdom: Plantae
- Clade: Tracheophytes
- Clade: Angiosperms
- Clade: Eudicots
- Clade: Rosids
- Order: Fabales
- Family: Fabaceae
- Subfamily: Faboideae
- Genus: Adenocarpus
- Species: A. foliolosus

Binomial name
- Adenocarpus foliolosus (Aiton) DC.

= Adenocarpus foliolosus =

Species of legume

Adenocarpus foliolosus, known locally as codeso and commonly known as Canary Island flatpod is a shrubby species of flowering plant in the legume family Fabaceae, subfamily Faboideae, that is endemic to Canary Islands where it can be found in Tenerife, La Gomera, El Hierro, Gran Canaria and La Palma. It has yellow flowers, a narrow, oblong legume with sparse glands, compound leaves and short petioles 1–3 millimetres (0.039–0.118 in) long.
