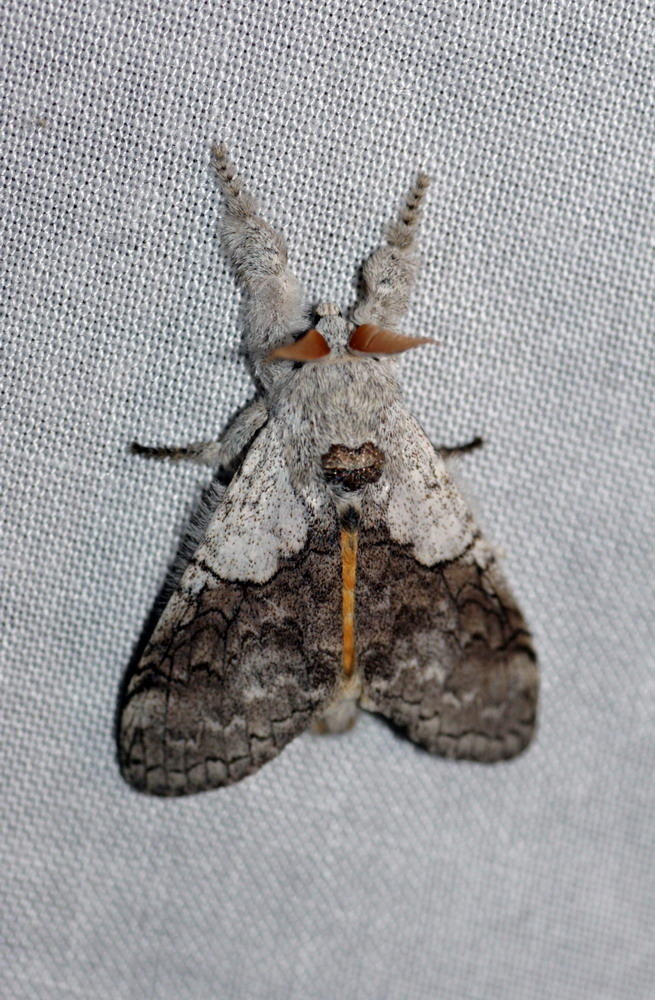
- Adult male

Scientific classification
- Kingdom: Animalia
- Phylum: Arthropoda
- Class: Insecta
- Order: Lepidoptera
- Superfamily: Noctuoidea
- Family: Erebidae
- Genus: Calliteara
- Species: C. horsfieldii

Binomial name
- Calliteara horsfieldii (Saunders, 1851)

Synonyms
- Arctia horsfieldii Saunders, 1851; Dasychira arga Moore, [1860] 1858-9; Dasychira longipennis Walker, 1862; Lymantria inhonorata Hopffer, 1874; Dasychira horsfieldi queenslandica Strand, 1915; Dasychira horsfieldii Saunders; Holloway, 1976; Orgyia horsfieldii Swinhoe, 1923; Dasychira horsfieldii Collenette, 1932; Dura inhonorata Swinhoe, 1923

= Calliteara horsfieldii =

Horsfield's tussock moth

Species of moth

Calliteara horsfieldii, or Horsfield's tussock moth, is a moth of the family Erebidae. The species was first described by the British entomologist Edward Saunders in 1851, and named in honor of the British naturalist Thomas Horsfield, who traveled southern Asia and published works on zoology from the region. C. horsfieldii can be found in southern Asia, the islands of the northern Indian Ocean, and many parts of south east Asia and Indonesia. It is also sometimes referred to as the Yellow Tussock Moth.

== Distribution ==
Calliteara horsfieldii is found the tropical portion of southern and southeast Asian including Sri Lanka, Thailand, Singapore, Malaysia, Sundaland, Sulawesi, Bali and towards New Guinea and Brunei.

== Description ==
The males of Calliteara horsfieldii show two colour forms. The first has uniform greyish forewings, while the second form has darker greyish colors towards the antemedial side of the forewings. The antemedial side of the forewings is strongly curved. Females of this species have whitish forewings with faint markings. The hindwings of both sexes are similar to one another and have yellowish tinge. The caterpillar is yellowish with rows of dorsal brushes.

As caterpillar, Calliteara horsfieldii is known to feed on many plants such as Etlingera elatior, Anacardium occidentale (the Cashew tree), Mangifera, Casuarina, Begonia, Bixa orellana, Brassica, Albizia falcataria, Dipterocarpus, Hopea, Camellia sinensis (the tea plant), Shorea, Acacia richii, Acacia mangium, Cassia fistula, Casuarina equisetifolia, Cinnamomum zeylanicum (the Cinnamon tree), Cocos nucifera (the Coconut palm), Erythrina, Pterocarpus, Tamarindus (the Tamarind), Lagerstroemia (the Crape myrtle), Ficus, Eucalyptus, Eugenia, Psidium, Syzygium, Pinus (the Pine) and Rosa (the Rose) species.

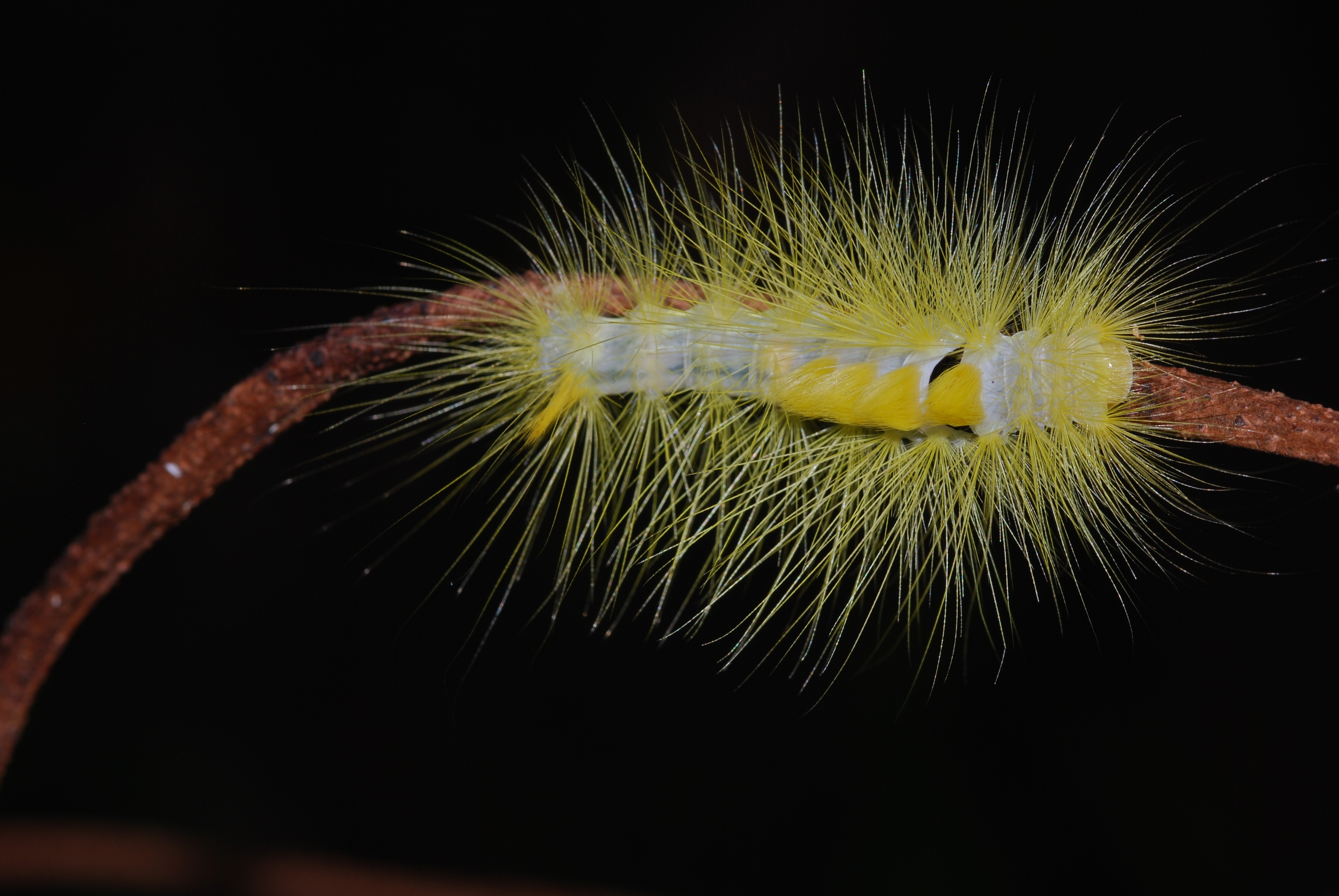
Caterpillar

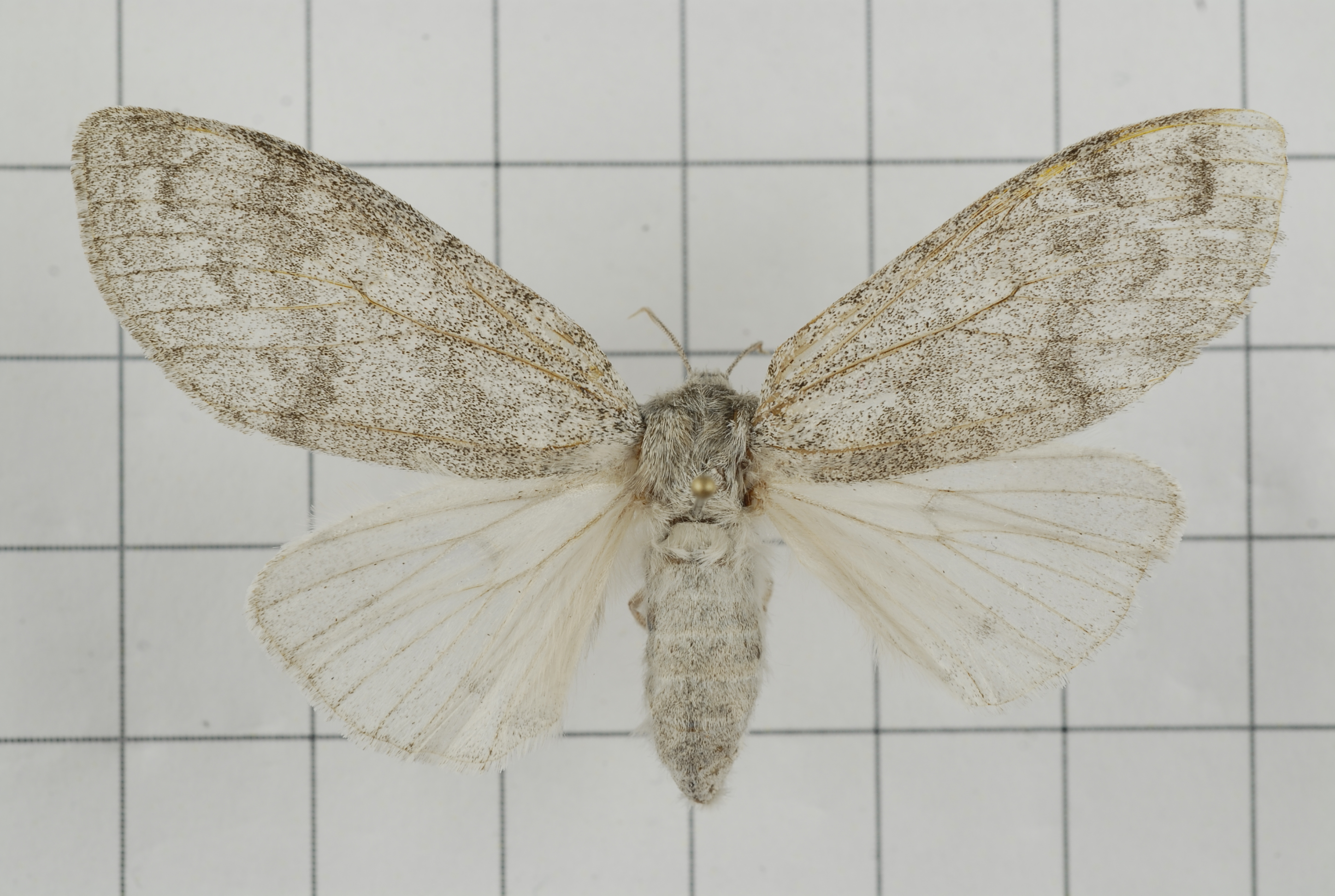
Morph of male
