= Alfonso Ortuño Salar =

Spanish cartoonist, illustrator and painter (born 1942)

- Born: 1942 (age 83–84); Orihuela, Alicante, Spain
- Known for: Political caricature, illustration and painting
- Awards: Premio Notario del Humor (2014); Hijo Predilecto de Orihuela (2024)

Alfonso Ortuño Salar (born 1942) is a Spanish cartoonist, illustrator, painter and writer from Orihuela, in the province of Alicante. He is known for his political caricatures and illustrations for Spanish newspapers, magazines and television, particularly his work for Televisión Española (TVE) between 1970 and 1992. His career has also encompassed painting, book illustration and gastronomic writing.

In 2024, he received the honorary distinction of Hijo Predilecto (Favoured Son) of Orihuela in recognition of his artistic career and contributions to the cultural life of his hometown.

== Early life and education ==
Ortuño was born in 1942 in Orihuela, in the Valencian Community of Spain. He grew up in the historic centre of the city, where he developed an interest in drawing and local cultural traditions.

He studied architecture in Murcia and Madrid but left his studies to pursue drawing professionally, initially working for an advertising agency.

== Career ==
=== Journalism and political caricature ===
Ortuño began his journalistic career in 1969, when journalist Manuel Martín Ferrand invited him to contribute illustrations to the newspaper Nivel.

In April 1970, he joined the news programme 24 Horas on Televisión Española, producing drawings and political caricatures to illustrate news stories for which filmed material was unavailable. He continued working in the broadcaster's news division until 1992.

Alongside his television career, Ortuño contributed illustrations and caricatures to numerous Spanish newspapers and magazines, including Cambio 16, Interviú, Gaceta Ilustrada, Triunfo, Hermano Lobo, Tiempo, Pueblo, Madrid, Sábado Gráfico and Diez Minutos.

One of his best-known magazine features was La casita de muñecas, a weekly illustration published in Diez Minutos that humorously depicted figures and events from Spanish society.

During the 1980s and 1990s, he also participated in political discussions on Antena 3 Radio.

Ortuño's caricatures frequently addressed political figures and public events. A 1976 article in El País reported on an exhibition in Orihuela that included caricatures of international politicians which had been reproduced as a deck of playing cards.

=== Painting and illustration ===
In addition to his career as a cartoonist, Ortuño has worked extensively as a painter. He has held numerous exhibitions throughout Spain, including exhibitions in Orihuela and Madrid. His painting has frequently incorporated historical and literary references, particularly the work of Diego Velázquez.

His artistic work has also reflected the history and traditions of Orihuela. He designed the Monument to the Armengola and produced ceramic murals associated with the monument. His work is also represented by a large mural in the Palacio del Marqués de Arneva, the seat of Orihuela's municipal government.

Ortuño illustrated the 42 royal octaves of Perito en lunas, the poetry collection by Miguel Hernández, another native of Orihuela.

=== Books and gastronomy ===
Ortuño has illustrated several books, including El Santoral by the journalist and writer Luis Carandell. He also wrote and illustrated Viaje a los arroces, a book devoted to rice dishes and gastronomy that received recognition from the Academia Española de Gastronomía and the Cofradía de la Buena Mesa.

== Honours and recognition ==
In 2011, Ortuño was appointed Síndico Portador de la Gloriosa Enseña del Oriol, a ceremonial role associated with Orihuela's civic traditions.

In 2014, he received the Premio Notario del Humor (Notary of Humour Award) from the University of Alicante, alongside fellow cartoonist Jesús Zulet, in recognition of their contributions to graphic humour.

On 28 December 2023, the Orihuela City Council unanimously approved his designation as Hijo Predilecto de la Ciudad de Orihuela, an honorary civic distinction.

The formal ceremony took place on 24 February 2024 at the Teatro Circo Atanasio Die in Orihuela.

== See also ==
- Spanish comics
- Political cartoon
- Graphic humour
