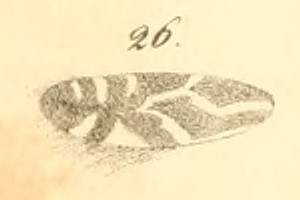
- wing pattern (original description)

Scientific classification
- Kingdom: Animalia
- Phylum: Arthropoda
- Clade: Pancrustacea
- Class: Insecta
- Order: Lepidoptera
- Family: Gracillariidae
- Genus: Phyllonorycter
- Species: P. scopariella

Binomial name
- Phyllonorycter scopariella (Zeller, 1846)

Synonyms
- Lithocolletis scopariellaZeller, 1846

= Phyllonorycter scopariella =

Species of moth

Phyllonorycter scopariella is a moth of the family Gracillariidae. It is found from Ireland to central Russia and from Denmark to France, Italy, the Czech Republic, Slovakia and Ukraine. It is also known from Portugal.

The wingspan is about 7 mm. It differs from Z.ulicicolella as follows: forewings duller, basal streak often connected with apex of first dorsal spot, cilia with only a faint line.

Adults are on wing from late May to July.

The larvae feed on Cytisus grandiflorus, Cytisus multiflorus, Cytisus scoparius, Cytisus striatus and Sarothamnus species. They mine under the bark of their host plant.
