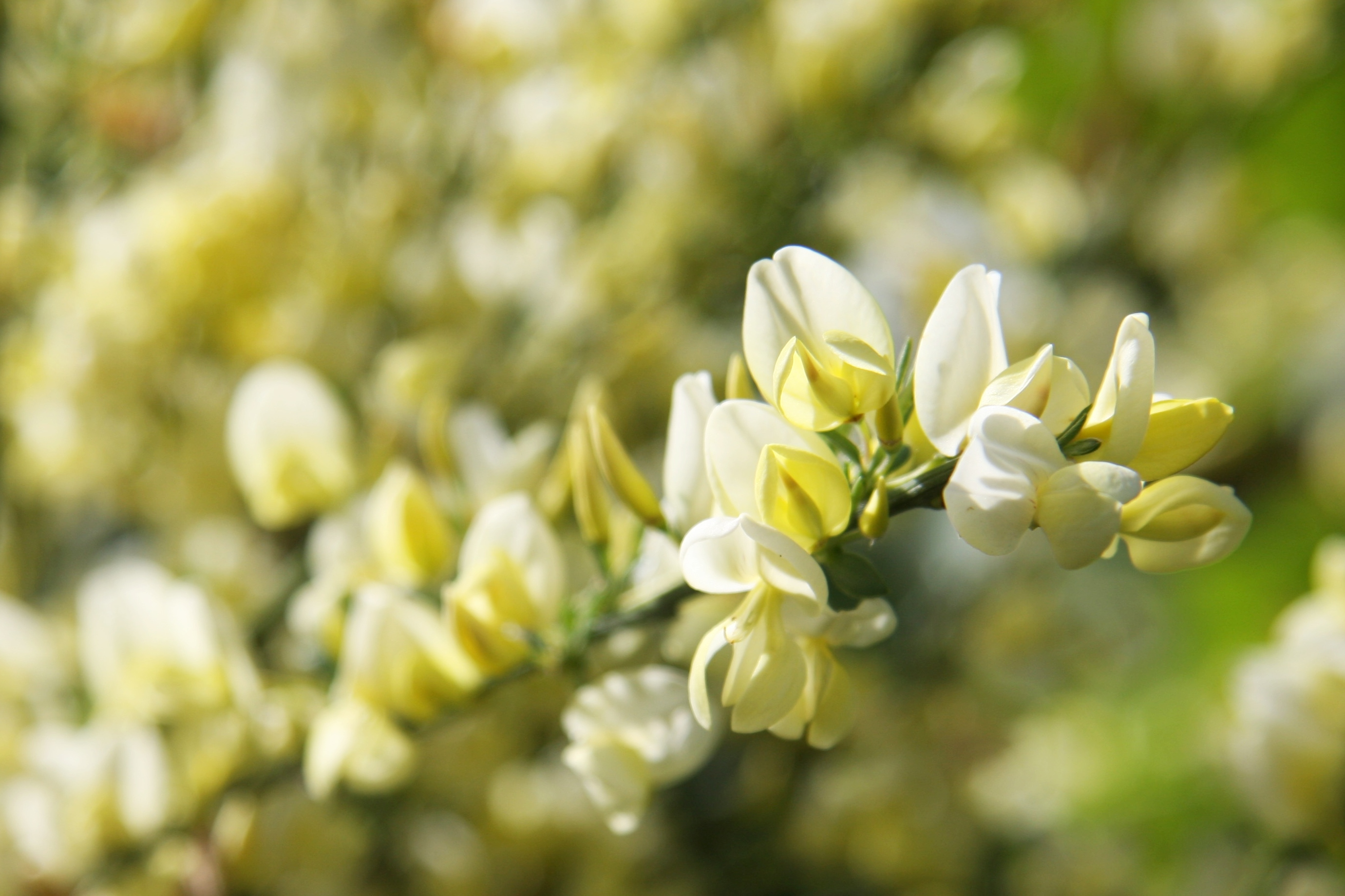
- Close-up of flowers
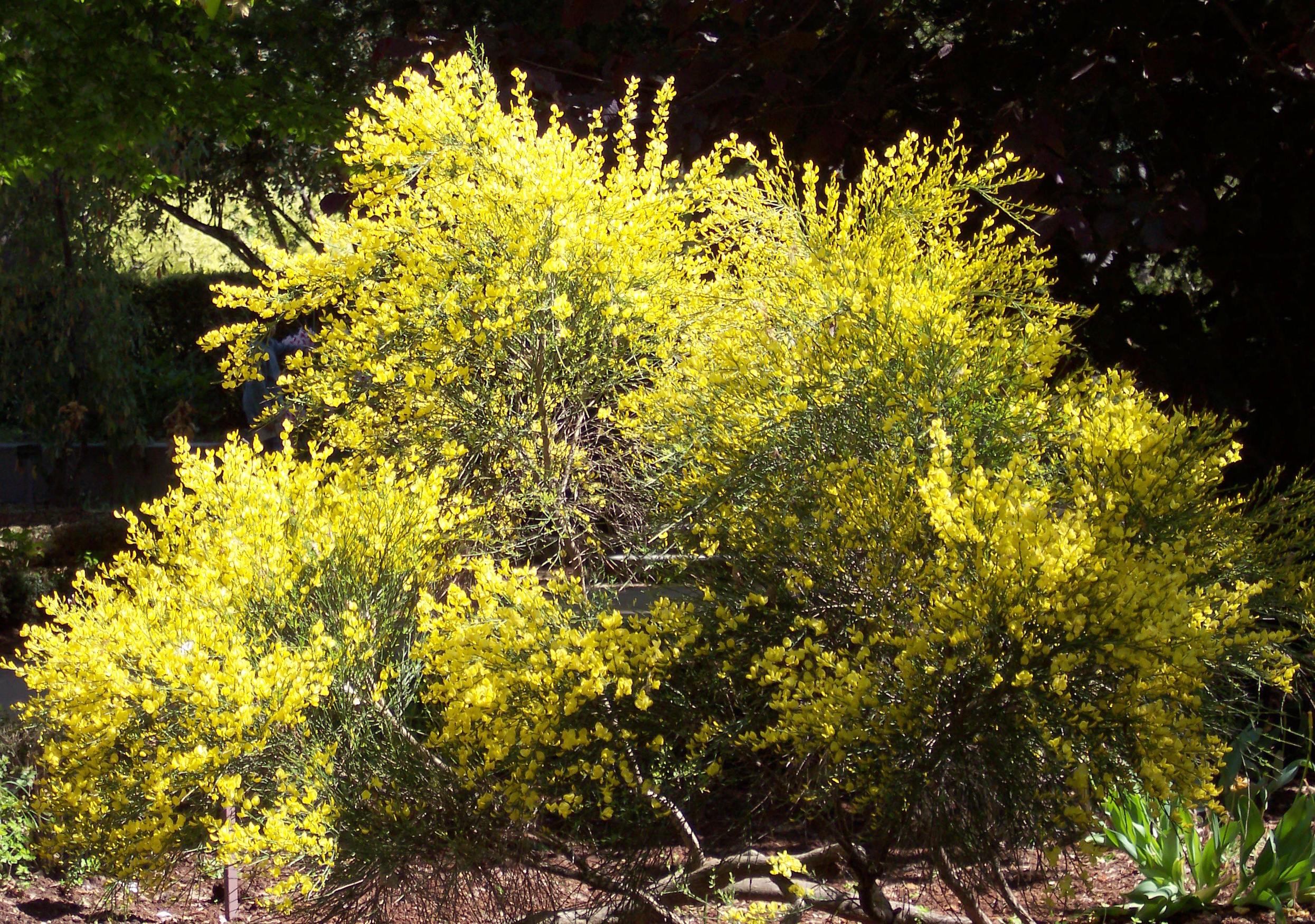
- 'Allgold' cultivar

Scientific classification
- Kingdom: Plantae
- Clade: Tracheophytes
- Clade: Angiosperms
- Clade: Eudicots
- Clade: Rosids
- Order: Fabales
- Family: Fabaceae
- Subfamily: Faboideae
- Genus: Cytisus
- Species: C. × praecox

Binomial name
- Cytisus × praecox Bean

Synonyms
- Cytisus × praecox f. albus (T.Sm.) Rehder; Cytisus × praecox albus T.Sm.; Cytisus × praecox f. luteus (T.Sm.) Rehder; Cytisus × praecox luteus T.Sm.; Genista × praecox Rob.

= Cytisus × praecox =

Species of plant

Cytisus × praecox, the Warminster broom, is an artificial hybrid species of flowering plant in the family Fabaceae. Its parents are Cytisus multiflorus (the white Spanish broom) and Cytisus oromediterraneus (the Pyrenean broom). A deciduous shrub, it is available from commercial suppliers. It has a number of cultivars, including 'Allgold' and 'Warminster', which have both gained the Royal Horticultural Society's Award of Garden Merit. Other commercially available cultivars are 'Albus' and 'Lilac Lady'.

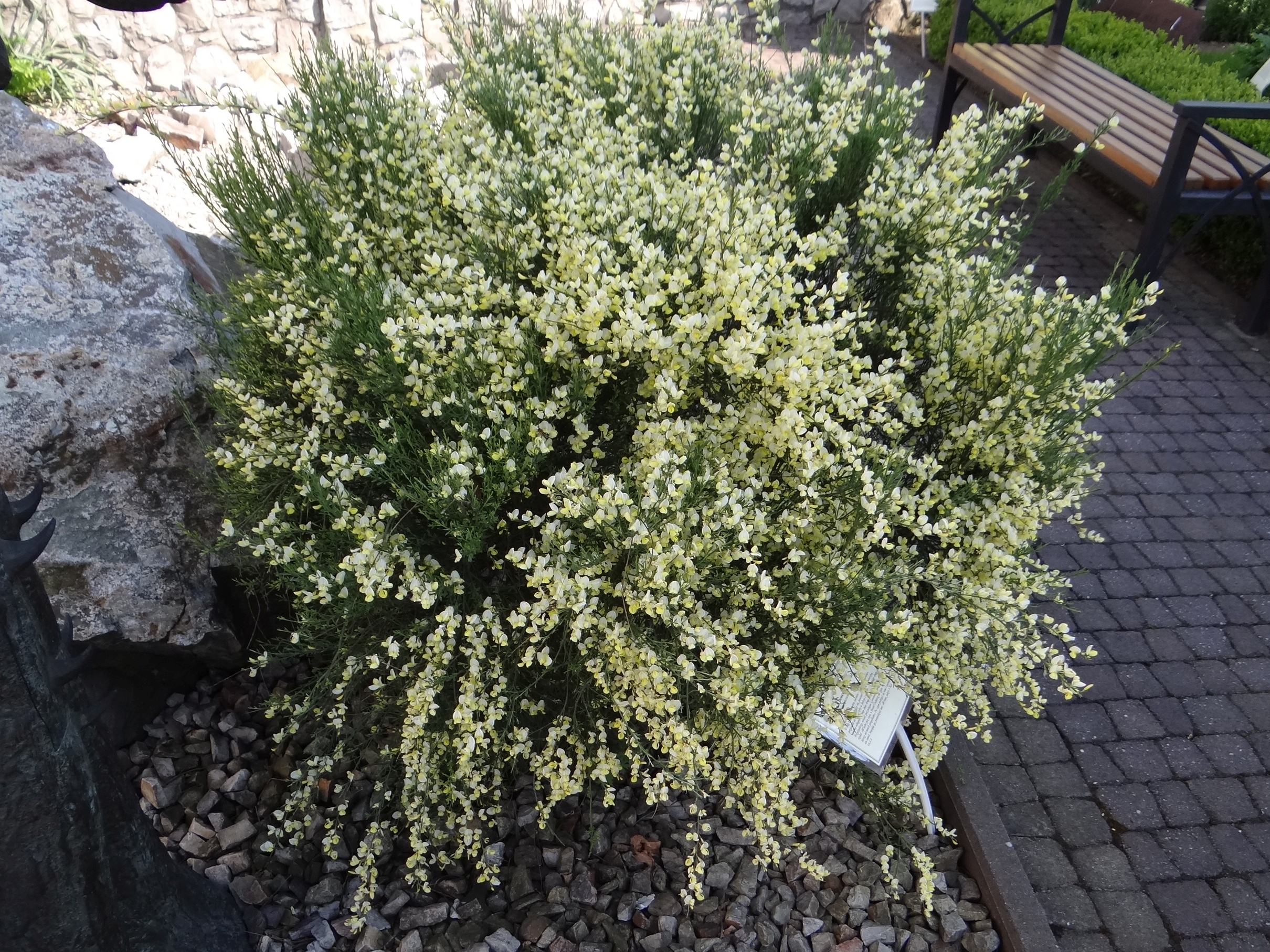
Cytisus × praecox 'Albus' cultivar
