= Cytisus × kewensis =

Scientific classification
- Kingdom: Plantae
- Clade: Tracheophytes
- Clade: Angiosperms
- Clade: Eudicots
- Clade: Rosids
- Order: Fabales
- Family: Fabaceae
- Subfamily: Faboideae
- Genus: Cytisus
- Species: C. × kewensis

Binomial name
- Cytisus × kewensis Bean

Hybrid species of plant

Cytisus × kewensis, the Kew broom or pineapple broom (a name it shares with Argyrocytisus battandieri), is an artificial hybrid species of flowering plant in the family Fabaceae. Its parents are Cytisus ardoinoi (from southeastern France) and Cytisus multiflorus (from the Iberian Peninsula). A mat-forming deciduous shrub 0.1 to 0.5 m (4 to 20 in) tall and 1 to 1.5 m (3 to 5 ft) wide with sprays of cream to yellow flowers, it has gained the Royal Horticultural Society's Award of Garden Merit. Drought tolerant, it is recommended as a bedding and erosion-control plant for areas of sandy, gravelly, rocky, or otherwise poor soils, and is hardy in USDA Zones 6 to 8.
