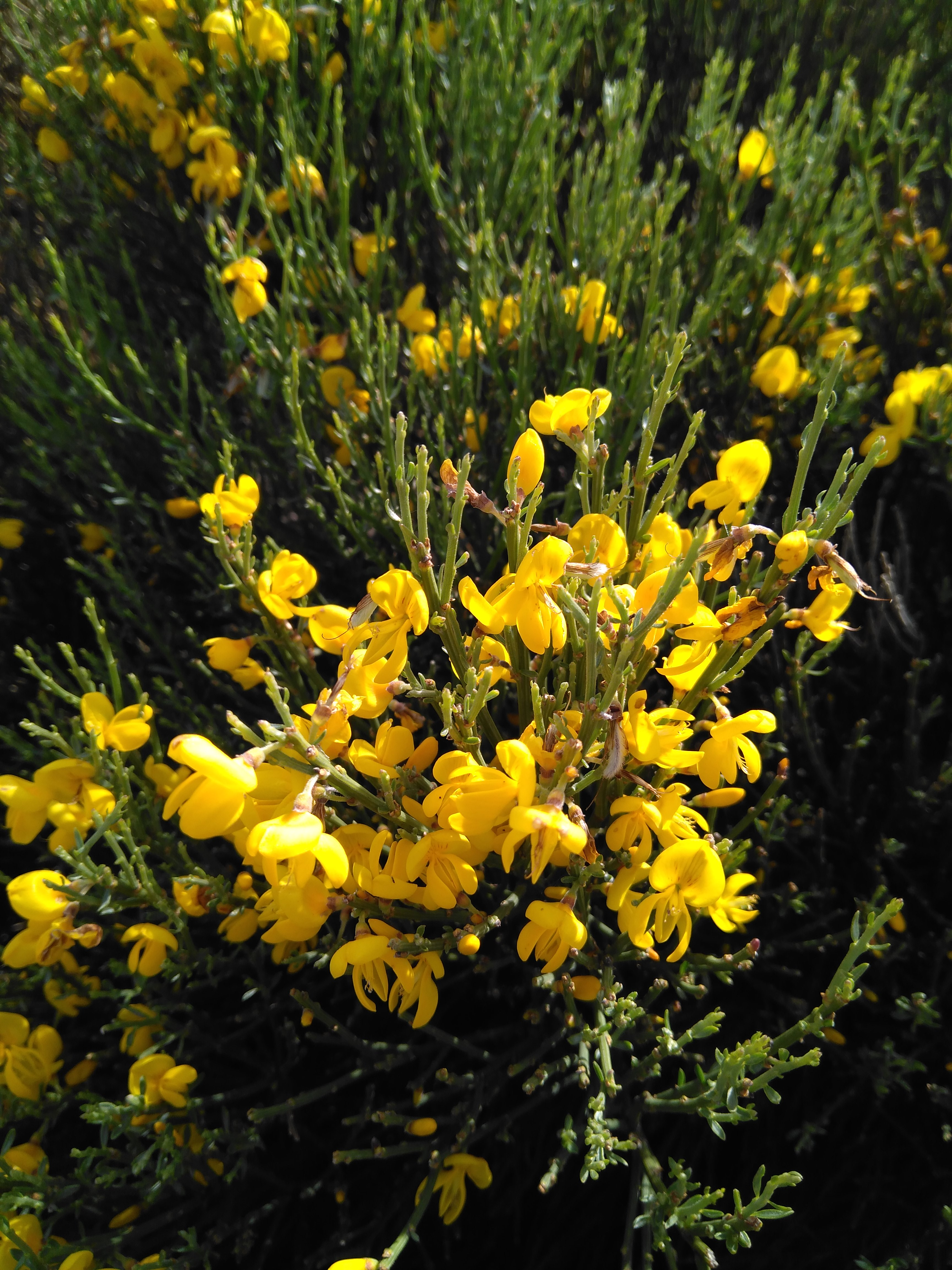
- Cytisus oromediterraneus in Bustarviejo, Madrid

Conservation status
- Least Concern (IUCN 3.1)

Scientific classification
- Kingdom: Plantae
- Clade: Tracheophytes
- Clade: Angiosperms
- Clade: Eudicots
- Clade: Rosids
- Order: Fabales
- Family: Fabaceae
- Subfamily: Faboideae
- Genus: Cytisus
- Species: C. oromediterraneus

Binomial name
- Cytisus oromediterraneus Rivas Mart. et al.

Synonyms
- List: Cytisus purgans auct. non (L.) Spach; Cytisus purgans (L.) Boiss.; Genista purgans (L.) DC.; Sarothamnus purgans (L.) Godr.; Genista balansae (Boiss.) Rouy; Genista europaea (G.López & C.E.Jarvis) O.Bòlos & Vigo; Cytisus balansae balansae G.López & C.E.Jarvis; Cytisus balansae europaeus (G.López & C.E.Jarvis) Muñoz Garm.; Sarothamnus purgans (L.) Gren. & Godr.

= Cytisus oromediterraneus =

Species of flowering plant

Cytisus oromediterraneus, the Pyrenean broom, is a shrub species belonging to the family Fabaceae.

== Description ==
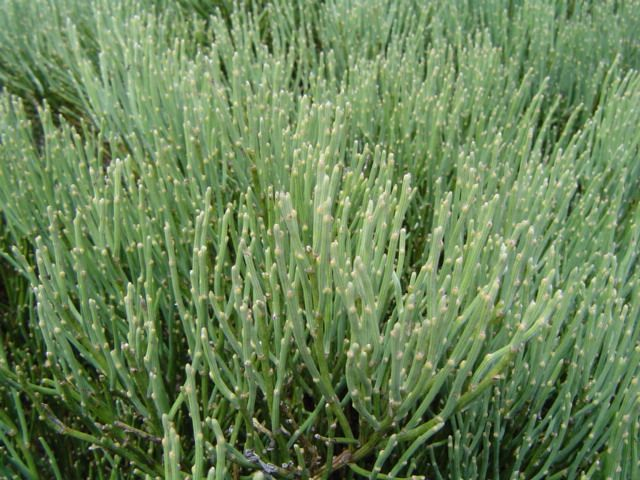
General view of the plant

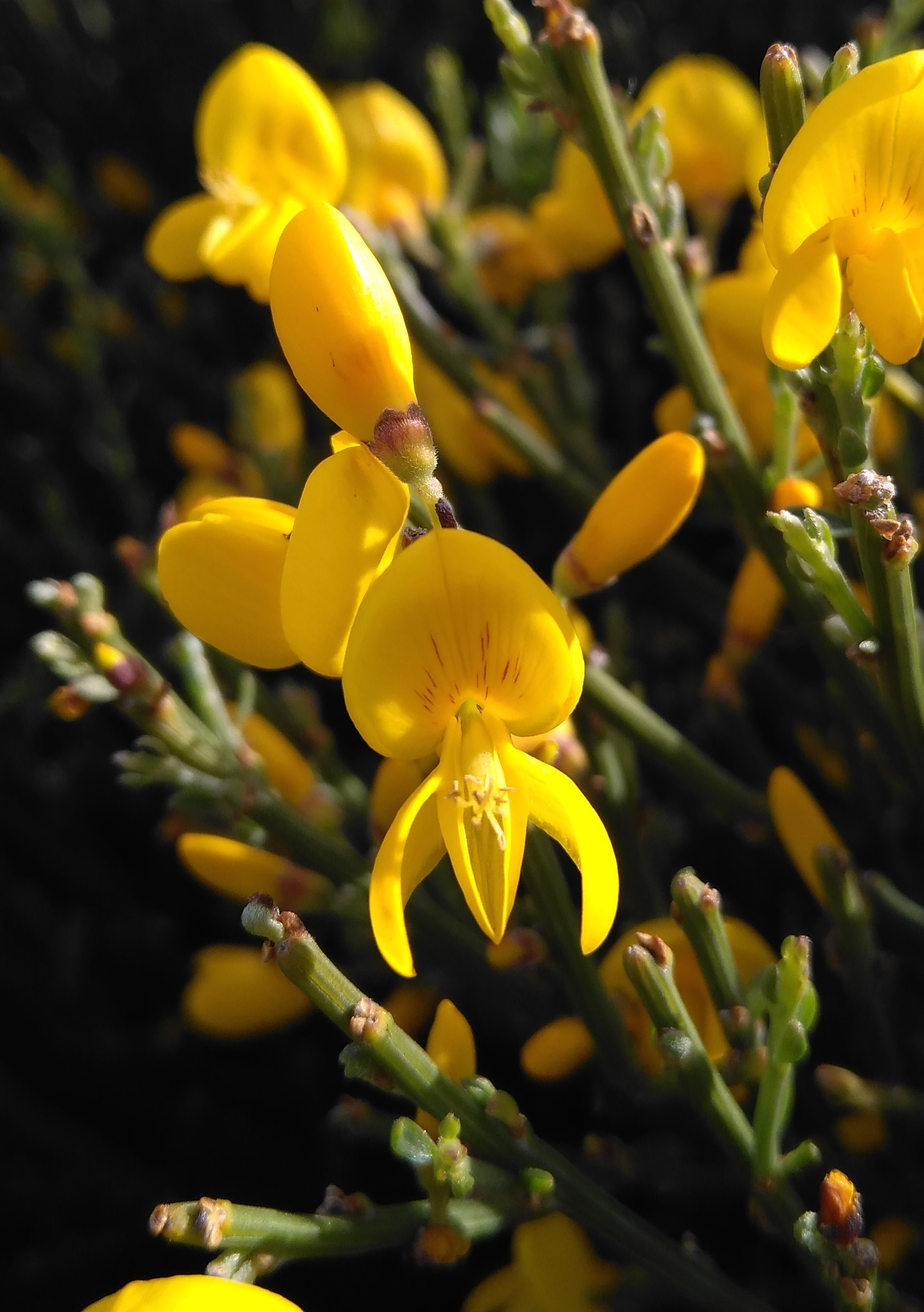
Detail of the papilionaceous flower

It is composed of dense, tightly packed branches. Forms extensive shrublands, alone or coexisting with other shrubs, such as the creeping juniper (Juniperus communis subsp. nana) in the high siliceous mountains, and almost always above forest level or coexisting with Scot pines. The leaves fall early so the stems are often bare; the lower ones are trifoliate, without petiole; the floral ones are simple and also seated. Flowers yellow, small, (9–12 mm) single or in pairs in the axil of the leaves, forming a more or less dense cluster at the termination of the branches supported by a 2–6 mm head. Calyx membranous, bell-shaped and hairy. The corolla is butterfly-like, with a rounded upper petal. The fruit is a legume of 15 to 30 mm, straight or somewhat curved, very compressed laterally and covered with hairs applied to its surface. It flowers from May to July.

Cytisus oromediterraneus dominates the vegetation of the oromediterranean floor in Gredos, it can cover the highest north-facing slopes of the supramediterranean; in fact, from some points of Gredos, such as the road leading to the platform, it can be clearly seen how the north-facing slopes are covered by the Pyrenean broom, while those facing south are inhabited by the hiniesta and/or the white broom. In the coexistence zone between the Pyrenean broom and the white broom it is possible to find individuals with very light yellow flowers that are interpreted as hybrids between the two species. Finally, in the western, most sectors of the Central system, two other very thorny shrubby fabaceae, whose optimum is in the oromediterranean together with the Pyrenean broom, can appear on the north-facing supramediterranean slopes, the common broom (Echinospartum barnadesii) and the Iberian broom (Echinospartun ibericum). The clearings of piornales are mainly occupied by various herbs and shrubs, among which we highlight the attractive viborera salmantina (Echium salmanticum).

Boraginaceae, endemic to the western half of the mountain range, the ortegia (Ortegia hispanica, caryophilic), the lavender (Lavandula pedunculata, Lamiaceae), the thyme (Santolina rosmarinifolia, Asteraceae), the aster with rice leaves (Aster sedifolius, Asteraceae) and the pink-flowered foxglove (Digitalis thapsi, Plantaginaceae), species that also mostly inhabit the cleared thickets of the oak forest floor and can ascend the sunny slopes to reach the Pyrenean broom.

== Observations ==
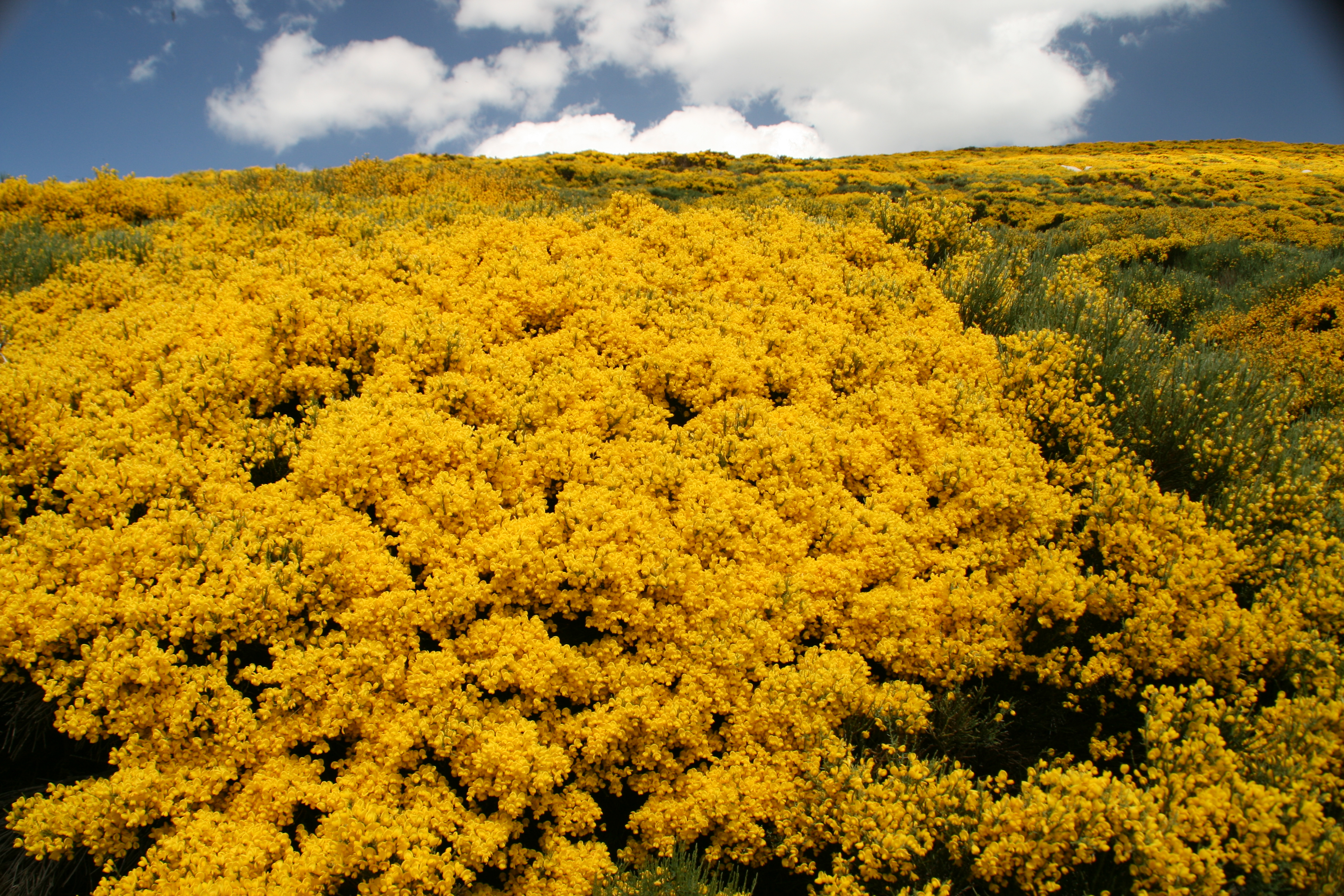
Piornal in the Sierra de Gredos

The appearance it presents is often cushioned to defend itself from the cold and the strong winds that blow at high altitudes. Its importance in the Spanish vegetation is very high due to the enormous surfaces it occupies. In the flowering season it tinges yellow many of the Spanish mountain ranges and gives off an intense and cloying smell similar to that of honey. It was used as fuel in ovens and for roofing huts. It is a conflicting species from the nomenclatural point of view. A new division has recently been established and is described in the next section.

Due to its morphological characters, ecology and biogeography, four taxa are accepted within this group; two in Europe: Cytisus oromediterraneus and Cytisus balansae subsp. nevadensis and two others in the mountains of North Africa: Cytisus balansae subsp. balansae and Cytisus balansae subsp. atlanticus.

- Cytisus oromediterraneus: Ecology and biogeography: Silicolous, supramediterranean

subhumid-humid, supratemperate and orotemperate humid-hyperhumid; submediterranean in the interior of the Iberian Peninsula. Carpetano-Leonese, Orocantabric, Oroiberian, Pyrenean and Auvernian (France). Cytisetalia scopario-striati, Juniperion nanae.

- Cytisus balansae subsp. balansae: Ecology and biogeography: Indifferent edaphic supramediterranean

and subhumid-humid oromediterranean. Atlassic, Morocco: High Atlas, Algeria: Dujrdjura, Aurès. Erinacetalia.

- Cytisus balansae subsp. atlanticus: Ecology and biogeography: Preferably siliceous,

supramediterranean and dry-subhumid oromediterranean. Atlassic, Morocco: High Atlas and Middle Atlas. Erinacetalia.

- Cytisus balansae subsp. nevadensis:

Ecology and biogeography: Silicolous, subhumid oromediterranean. Spain, Nevadense, Genisto versicoloris-Juniperion hemisphaericae.

== Distribution ==
In France, Iberian Peninsula and North Africa. In the Peninsula it is very abundant in the Guadarrama Mountains, Sierra de Gredos, Paramera de Ávila, La Serrota, Iberian system, Montes de León, Pyrenees. It also appears in Galicia, Cantabria, Aragon, Catalonia, Castile, Extremadura and Andalusia.

== Properties ==
Indications: It is used as a laxative and diuretic.

Other uses: It has been used as fuel in ovens, for the manufacture of brooms, to make hut roofs and also as bedding for cattle.

== Taxonomy ==
Cytisus oromediterraneus was described by (G.López & C.E.Jarvis) Rivas Mart. & al. and published in Veg. Picos de Europa 264. 1984.

=== Etymology ===
- Cytisus: generic name derived from the Greek word: kutisus, a Greek name for two legumes, which are probably an alfafa Medicago arborea L. and a laburnum Laburnum anagyroides Medik.
- oromediterraneus: epithet.

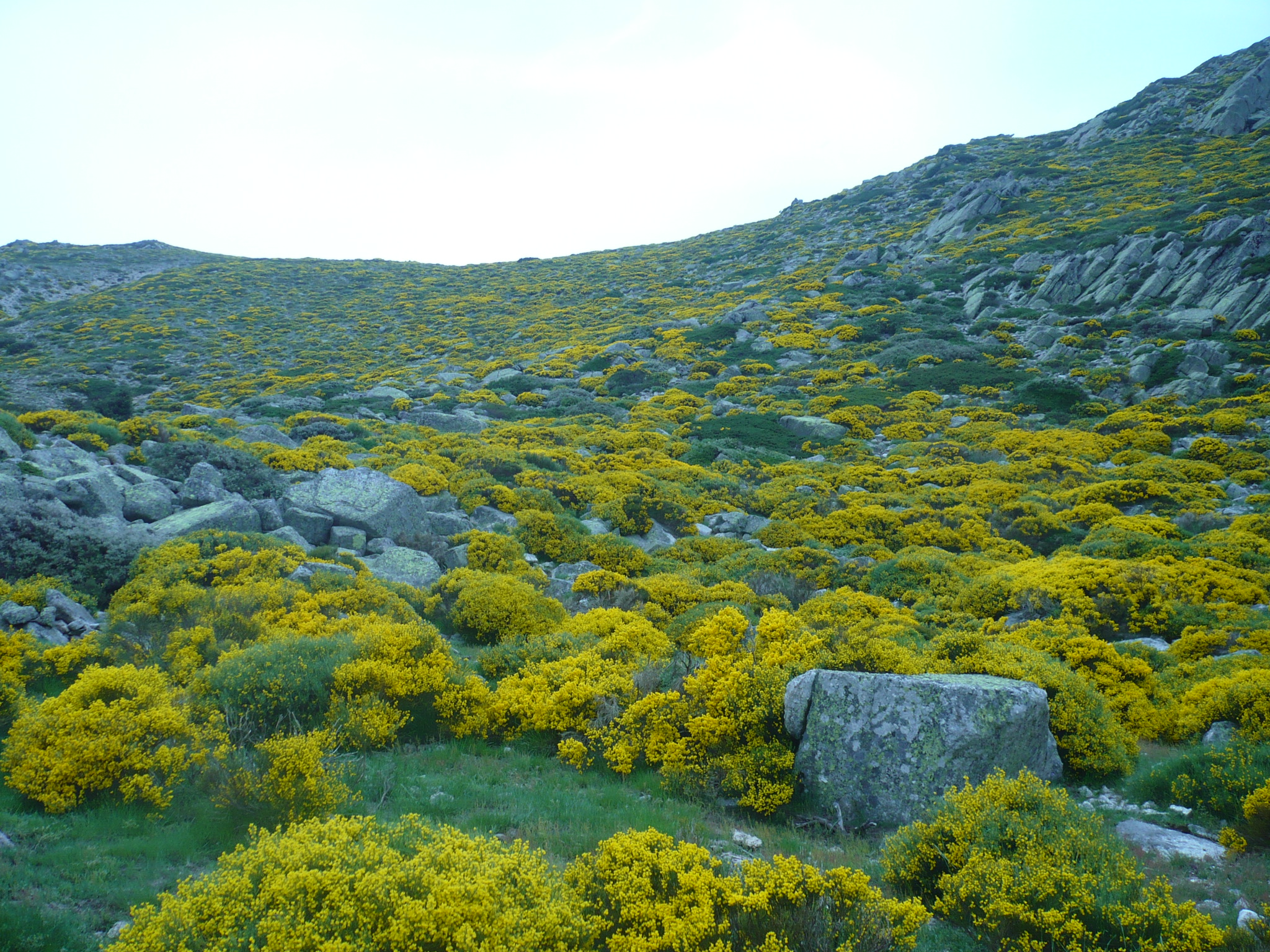
Flowering Pyrenean broom in the Sierra de Guadarrama, Spain
