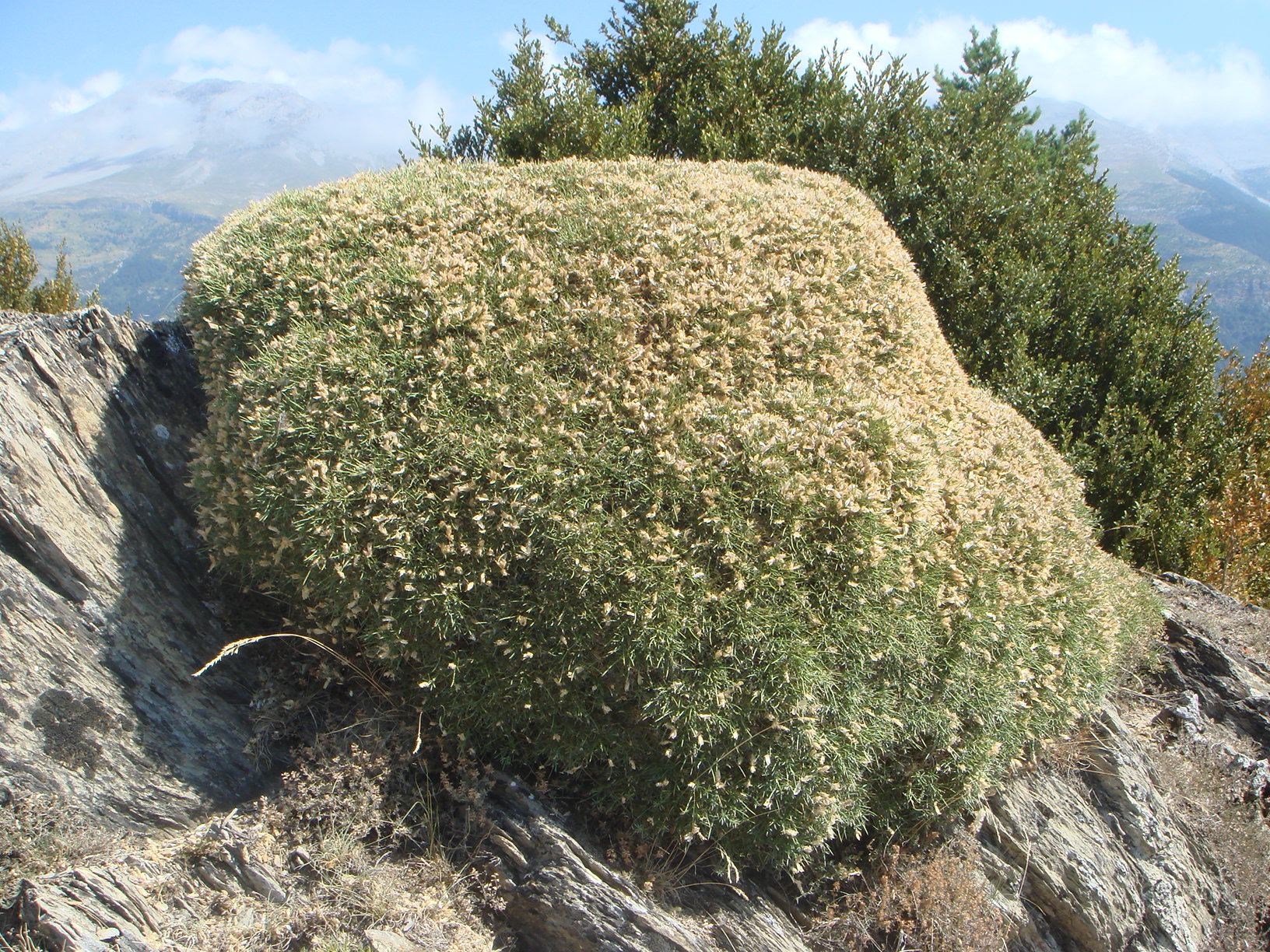
- Echinospartum horridum

Scientific classification
- Kingdom: Plantae
- Clade: Tracheophytes
- Clade: Angiosperms
- Clade: Eudicots
- Clade: Rosids
- Order: Fabales
- Family: Fabaceae
- Subfamily: Faboideae
- Tribe: Genisteae
- Genus: Echinospartum (Spach) Fourr.

Species
- 4–5; see text

= Echinospartum =

Genus of legumes

Echinospartum is a genus of flowering plants in the family Fabaceae. It contains five species of shrubs and subshrubs native to France, Spain, and Portugal. Plants typically grow on open and exposed mountain slopes and in rocky areas.

The genus belongs to subfamily Faboideae. It is possibly synonymous with Genista.

== Species ==
Echinospartum comprises the following species:

- Echinospartum barnadesii (Graells) Rothm. – Spain (Sierra de Gredos)
- Echinospartum boissieri (Spach) Rothm. – southeastern Spain
- Echinospartum horridum (M. Vahl) Rothm. – Pyrenees and south-central France
- Echinospartum ibericum Rivas Mart., Sánchez Mata & Sancho – Spain and Portugal
  - subsp. algibicum (Talavera & Aparicio) Rivas Mart. – Spain (Sierra de Grazalema)
  - subsp. ibericum Rivas-Martínez, Sánchez-Mata –northwest and central Iberia
- Echinospartum lusitanicum (L.) Rothm. – central Portugal to west-central Spain
