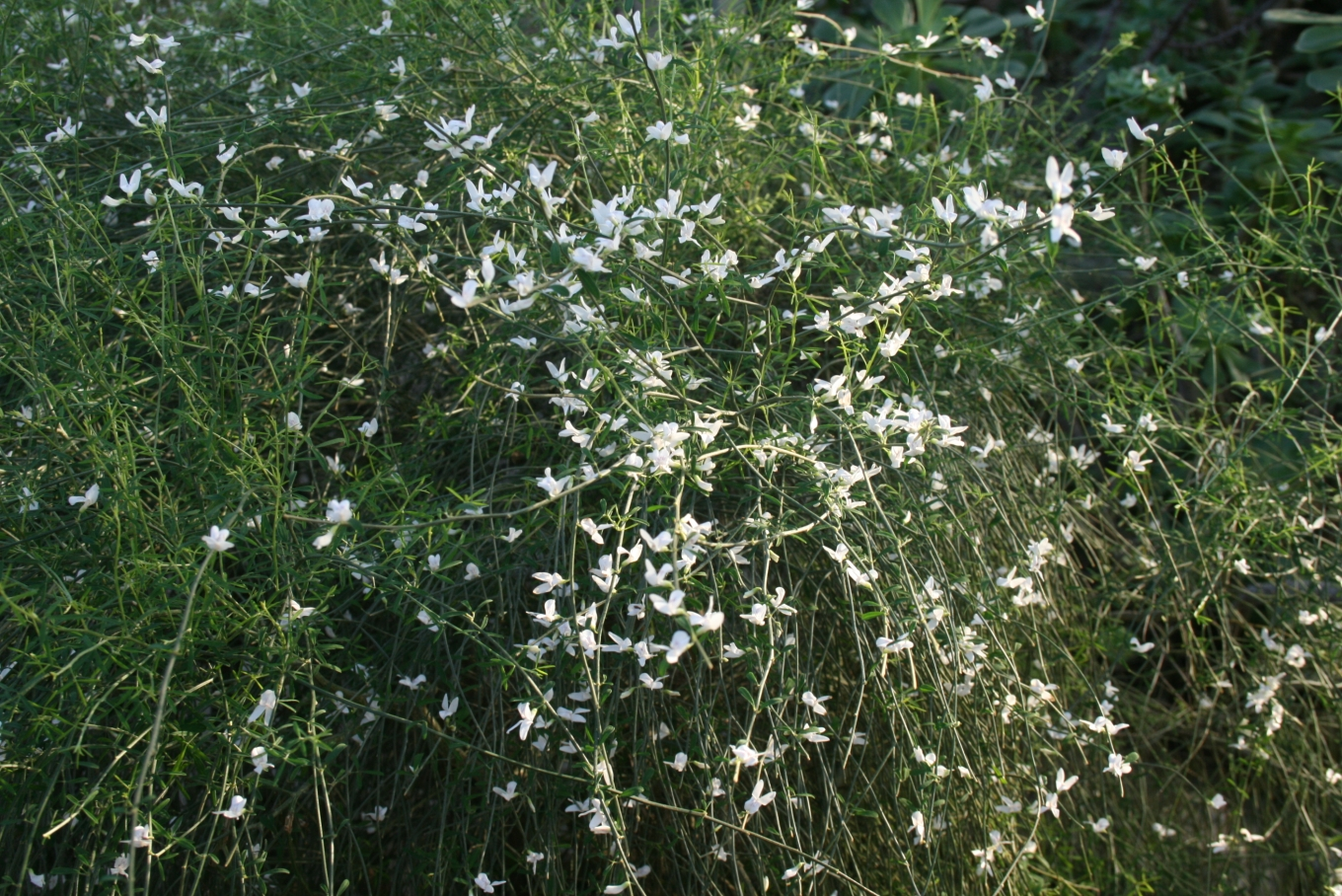

Scientific classification
- Kingdom: Plantae
- Clade: Tracheophytes
- Clade: Angiosperms
- Clade: Eudicots
- Clade: Rosids
- Order: Fabales
- Family: Fabaceae
- Subfamily: Faboideae
- Genus: Cytisus
- Species: C. filipes

Binomial name
- Cytisus filipes Webb

Synonyms
- Genista filipes (Webb) B.S.Williams; Spartocytisus filipes Webb

= Cytisus filipes =

Species of flowering plant

Cytisus filipes is a species of flowering plant in the Fabaceae family. It is native and endemic to the Canary Islands.

== Description ==
Deciduous shrub with ternate leaves. Blooms with white, pea-shaped flowers from April to May.

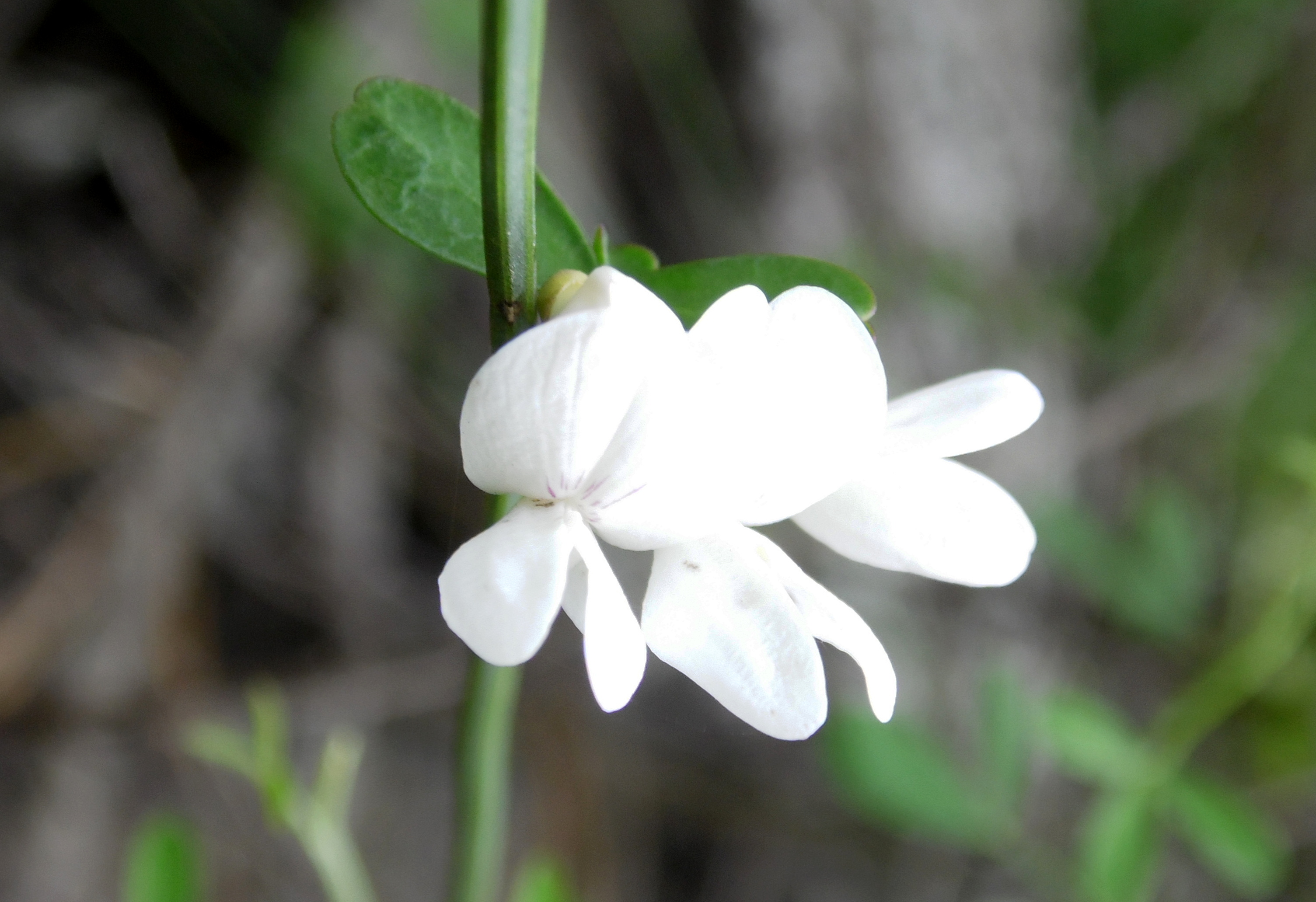
Flowers

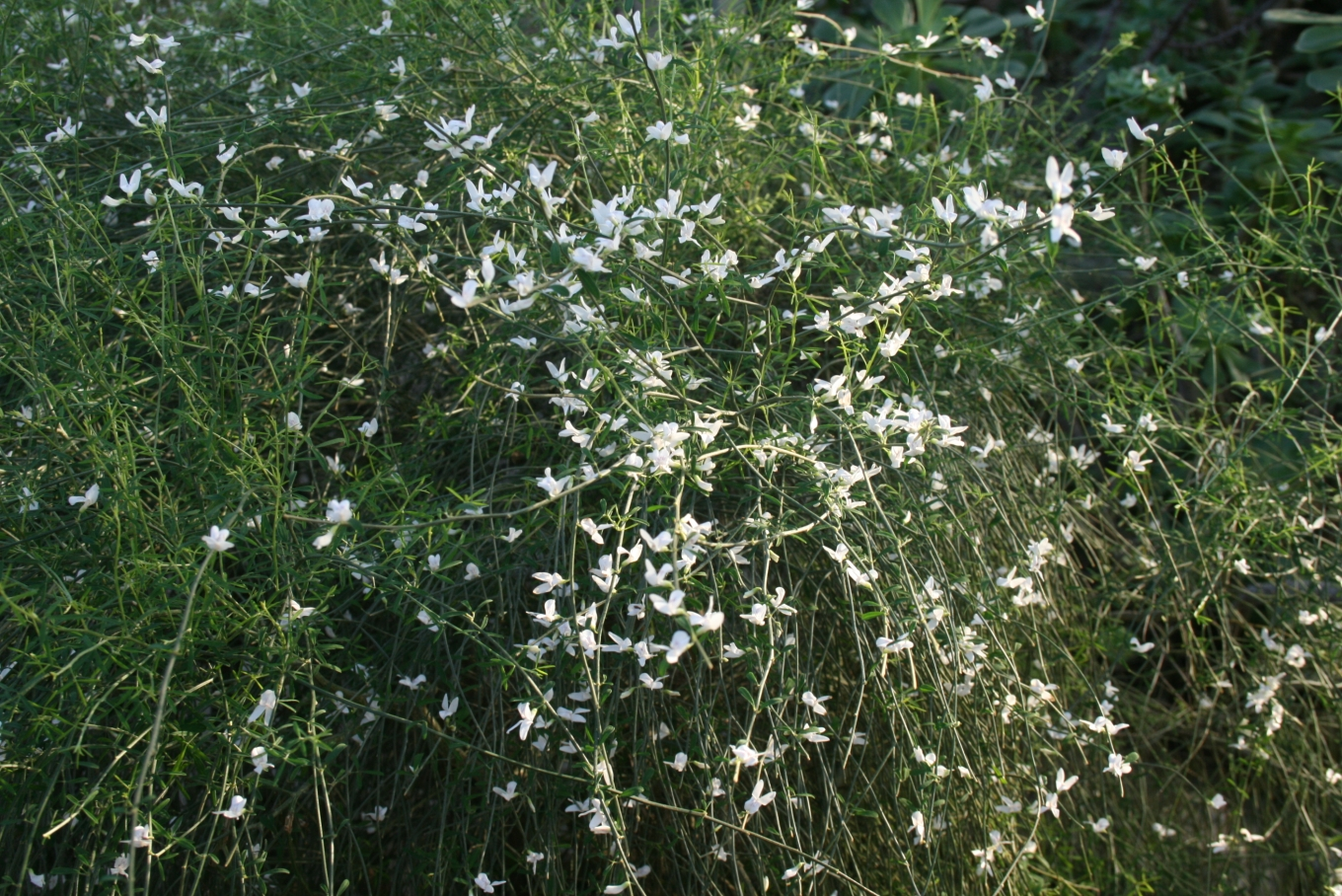
Habit
