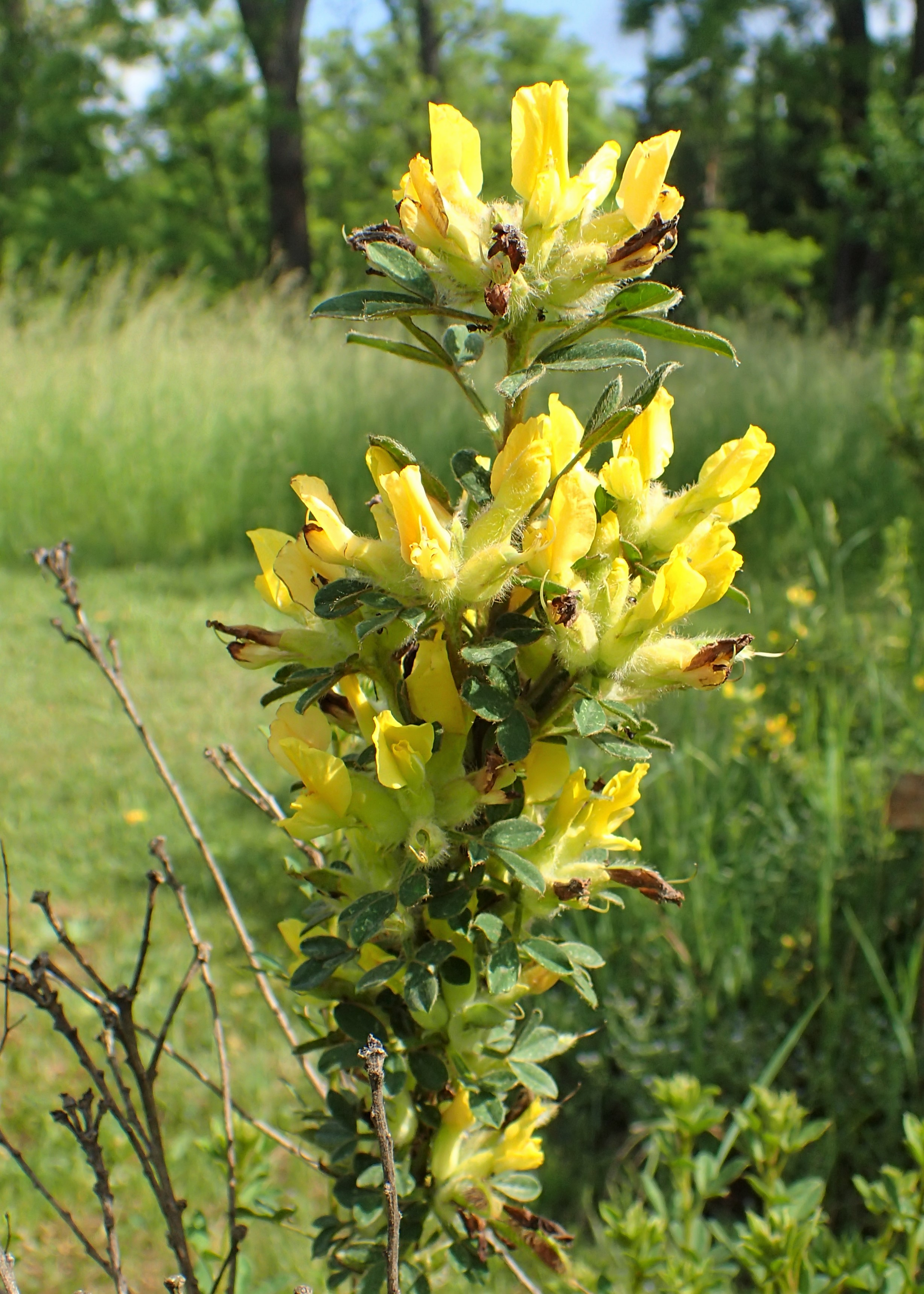

Scientific classification
- Kingdom: Plantae
- Clade: Embryophytes
- Clade: Tracheophytes
- Clade: Angiosperms
- Clade: Eudicots
- Clade: Rosids
- Order: Fabales
- Family: Fabaceae
- Subfamily: Faboideae
- Genus: Cytisus
- Species: C. emeriflorus

Binomial name
- Cytisus emeriflorus Rchb.

Synonyms
- Lembotropis emeriflora (Rchb.) Skalická

= Cytisus emeriflorus =

Species of flowering plant

Cytisus emeriflorus (Italian: Citiso insubrico) is a species of flowering plant in the family Fabaceae. Its native range is Switzerland and Italy.
