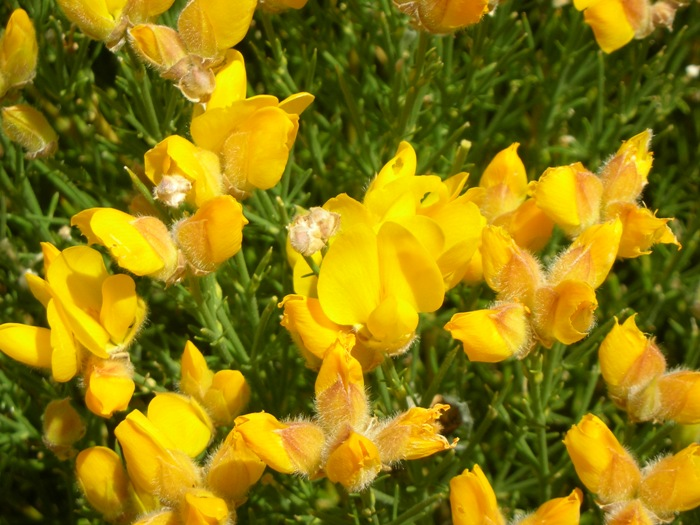
- Echinospartum barnadesii

Scientific classification
- Kingdom: Plantae
- Clade: Tracheophytes
- Clade: Angiosperms
- Clade: Eudicots
- Clade: Rosids
- Order: Fabales
- Family: Fabaceae
- Subfamily: Faboideae
- Genus: Echinospartum
- Species: E. barnadesii

Binomial name
- Echinospartum barnadesii (Graells) Rothm.

= Echinospartum barnadesii =

Species of plant

Echinospartum barnadesii is a species of plant of the Fabaceae family.

== Description ==
Very thorny, rounded, branched shrub, forming cushions close to the ground. Branches are opposite and grooved. Trifoliate opposite leaves, with narrowly lanceolate leaflets. The flowers are at the end of the branches, gathered in tight clusters of 3 to 9. Yellow corolla, butterfly-shaped, with a silky exterior. Flowers during the summer.

== Distribution and habitat ==
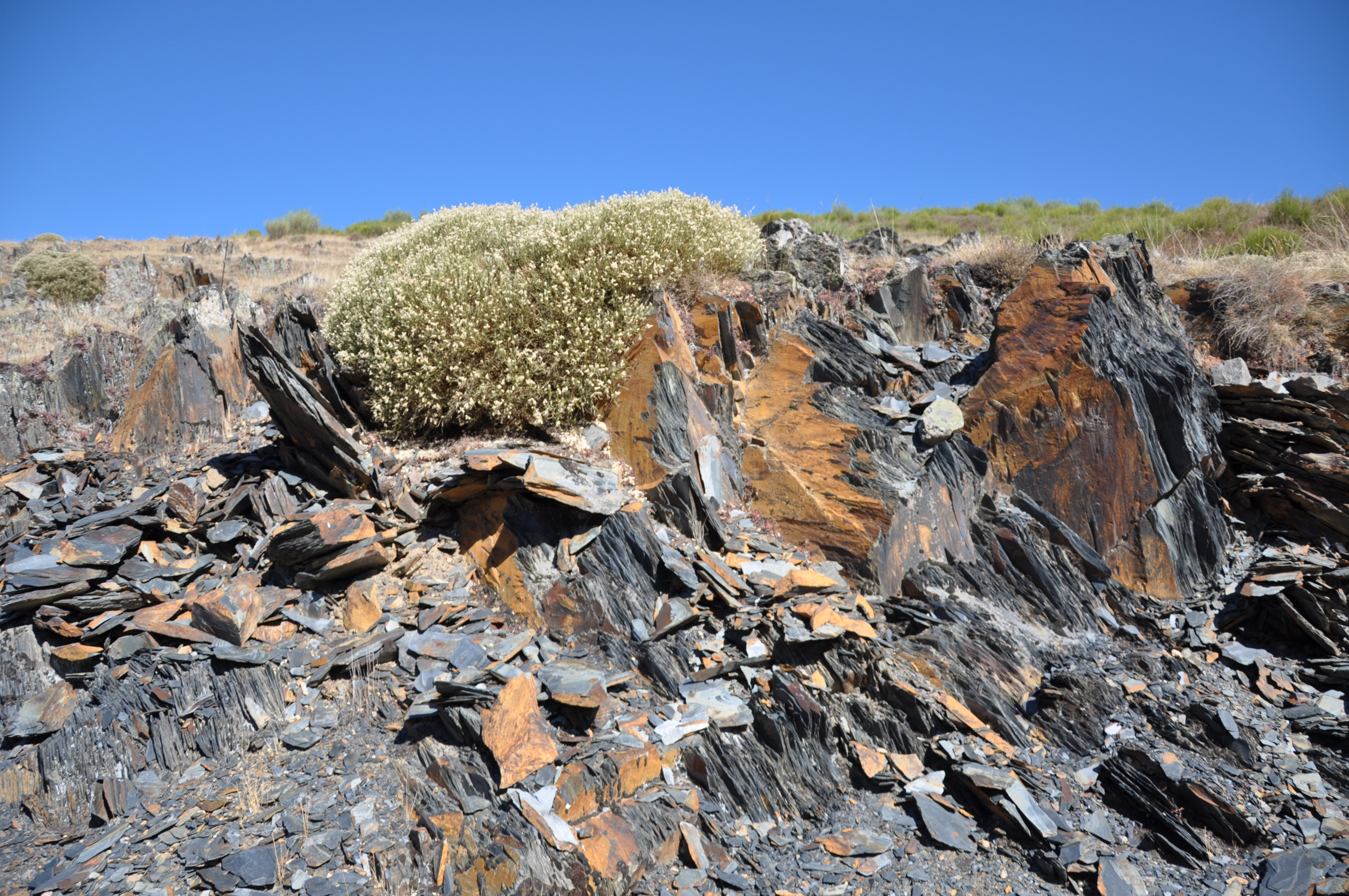
Echinospartum barnadesii subps. dorsisericeum in Teleno, León

In the Iberian Peninsula. In acid soils. Dry, sunny places.

== Taxonomy ==
Echinospartum barnadesii was described by (Graells) Rothm. and published in Botanische Jahrbücher für Systematik, Pflanzengeschichte und Pflanzengeographie 72: 81. 1941.

=== Etymology ===
- Echinospartum: generic name derived from the Ancient Greek: echînos; Latinised echinus = "hedgehog, marine and terrestrial, dome of chestnuts, and so on"; and the genus Spartium L. Plants of this genus are often spiny and rounded.
- barnadesii: epithet given in honour of the Spanish botanist Miguel Barnades.

=== Subspecies ===
Includes two subspecies.

- Echinospartum barnadesii (Graells) Rothm. subsp. barnadesii which occurs only in the Sierra de Gredos, from 1400 to 2250 meters above sea level and is considered a non-threatened endemic.
- Echinospartum barnadesii subsp. dorsisericeum G.López which lives between 750 and 2200 meters above sea level in the mountains of the northwest, centre and south of the Iberian Peninsula.

=== Synonymy ===
- Cytisanthus barnadesii (Graells) Gams in Hegi
- Echinospartum lusitanicum subsp. barnadesii (Graells) C. Vicioso ex M. Laínz
- Genista barnadesii Graells
- Genista lusitanica subsp. barnadesii (Graells) C. Vicioso

== Common names ==
In Spanish: acebilla, ardivella, ardivieja, ardiviella, aulaga, bolaga, cambrión, cambronera, cambrón, cambrón, erizo, erizón, escambrión, escambruñeiro, escambrón, espino, espino cambrión, espino cambrón, espino escambrión, espino escambrón, espinu escambrión, gatuña.
