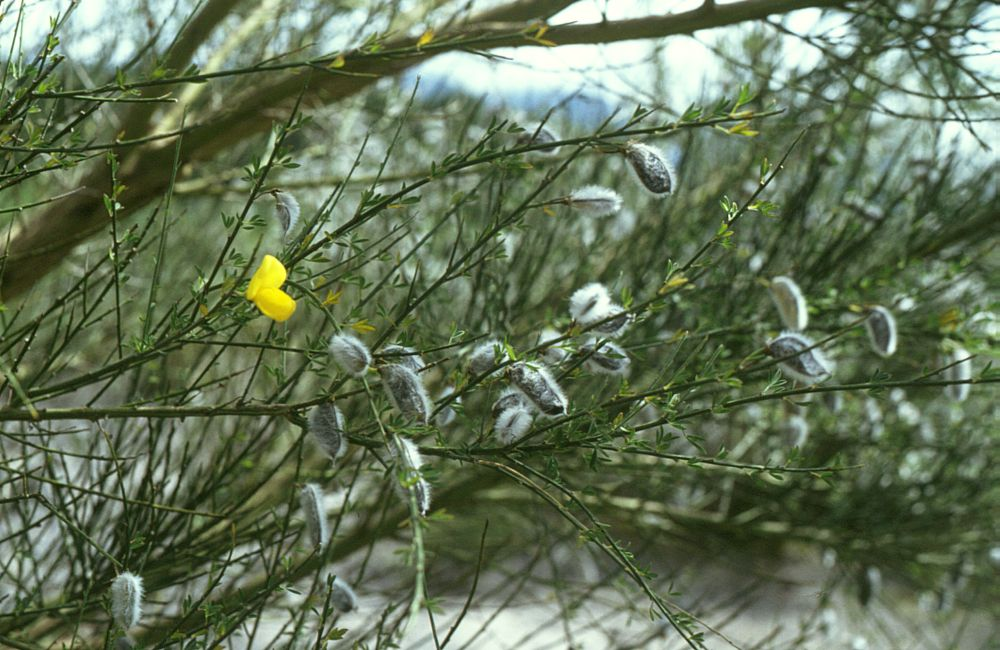
- Immature seed pods

Conservation status
- Least Concern (IUCN 3.1)

Scientific classification
- Kingdom: Plantae
- Clade: Embryophytes
- Clade: Tracheophytes
- Clade: Angiosperms
- Clade: Eudicots
- Clade: Rosids
- Order: Fabales
- Family: Fabaceae
- Subfamily: Faboideae
- Genus: Cytisus
- Species: C. striatus

Binomial name
- Cytisus striatus (Hill) Rothm.

Synonyms
- List: Cytisus patens L.; Cytisus pendulinus L.f.; Cytisus welwitschii (Boiss. & Reut.) A.B.Jacks.; Genista striata Hill; Sarothamnus eriocarpus Boiss. & Reut.; Sarothamnus patens sensu Webb; Sarothamnus striatus (Hill) Samp.; Sarothamnus welwitschii Boiss. & Reut.

= Cytisus striatus =

Species of legume

Cytisus striatus is a species of flowering plant in the legume family known by the common names hairy-fruited broom and Portuguese broom. This plant is native to the west of the Iberian Peninsula and northwestern Morocco. It has been introduced to and has become invasive in parts of western North America and other regions with Mediterranean-type climates.

== Description ==
This is an upright, bushy shrub reaching 1–3 metres (3.3–9.8 ft) in height. It is highly branched and sprawling. It has green, photosynthetic stems, with 8-10 longitudinal ridges. The leaves are small, made up of one or three leaflets, each leaflet up to 13 mm long; they are deciduous or evergreen, depending on the climate. The yellow pea-like flowers occur singly or in pairs along the stems. The fruit is a green ripening blackish, slightly inflated, densely white-haired legume pod that releases seeds explosively upon maturation. The seeds can be spread by ants.

This shrub is similar to its relative Cytisus scoparius, but it can be distinguished by the paler shade of yellow of its flowers, and by the densely hairy pods.

Two subspecies are accepted:

- Cytisus striatus subsp. megalanthus (Pau & Font Quer) Rivas Mart. & Belmonte. Northwest Africa, in northern Morocco.
- Cytisus striatus subsp. striatus. Europe, in Spain and Portugal.

== Distribution and habitat ==
The species is native to Portugal and Spain, extending into northern Morocco, where it forms part of shrubland ecosystems known as giestais. It typically grows in acidic, nutrient-poor soils from granite, schist, or quartzite. C. striatus is commonly found along roadsides, open hillsides, in forest clearings, fallow lands, and rocky slopes, growing at altitudes up to 1,200 m.

In Portugal, C. striatus has become a dominant component of secondary vegetation communities following deforestation or fire disturbance. Its rapid germination, nitrogen-fixing ability, and high seed output allow it to colonise disturbed soils efficiently. Dense broom stands have been reported to dominate roadsides and mountain slopes.

== Ecology ==
As a member of the Fabaceae, C. striatus forms symbiotic nodules with Bradyrhizobium species that enable atmospheric nitrogen fixation. This improves soil fertility in poor or eroded areas. Soils beneath the shrub typically contain higher concentrations of organic matter, nitrogen, and phosphorus than those in adjacent open areas.

C. striatus increases soil nutrient levels but reduces herbaceous species richness and diversity due to shading and competition. The shrub's dense canopy can reduce understory herb diversity by creating shaded, nutrient-rich microsites dominated by grasses such as Poaceae and Asteraceae. Despite this local suppression, the patchiness created by clumps increases overall landscape diversity.

Physiological studies show that C. striatus can alternate between atmospheric N₂ fixation and inorganic nitrogen uptake, depending on phosphorus availability and soil fertility, thereby gaining a competitive advantage in low-nutrient environments. This flexibility enables the shrub to continue growing under sensitive conditions. C. striatus produces higher biomass at a low carbon cost and overcomes efficient nitrogen fixation under limited resources, contributing to its ability to thrive in degraded or acidic habitats.

Additionally, the species contributes to fire ecology by accumulating large amounts of combustible litter, which promotes high-intensity burns and further favours its regeneration. Its extensive root system and resprouting ability allow quick post-fire recovery. This adds to the dominance of C. striatus in frequently disturbed landscapes.

=== Invasive plant species ===
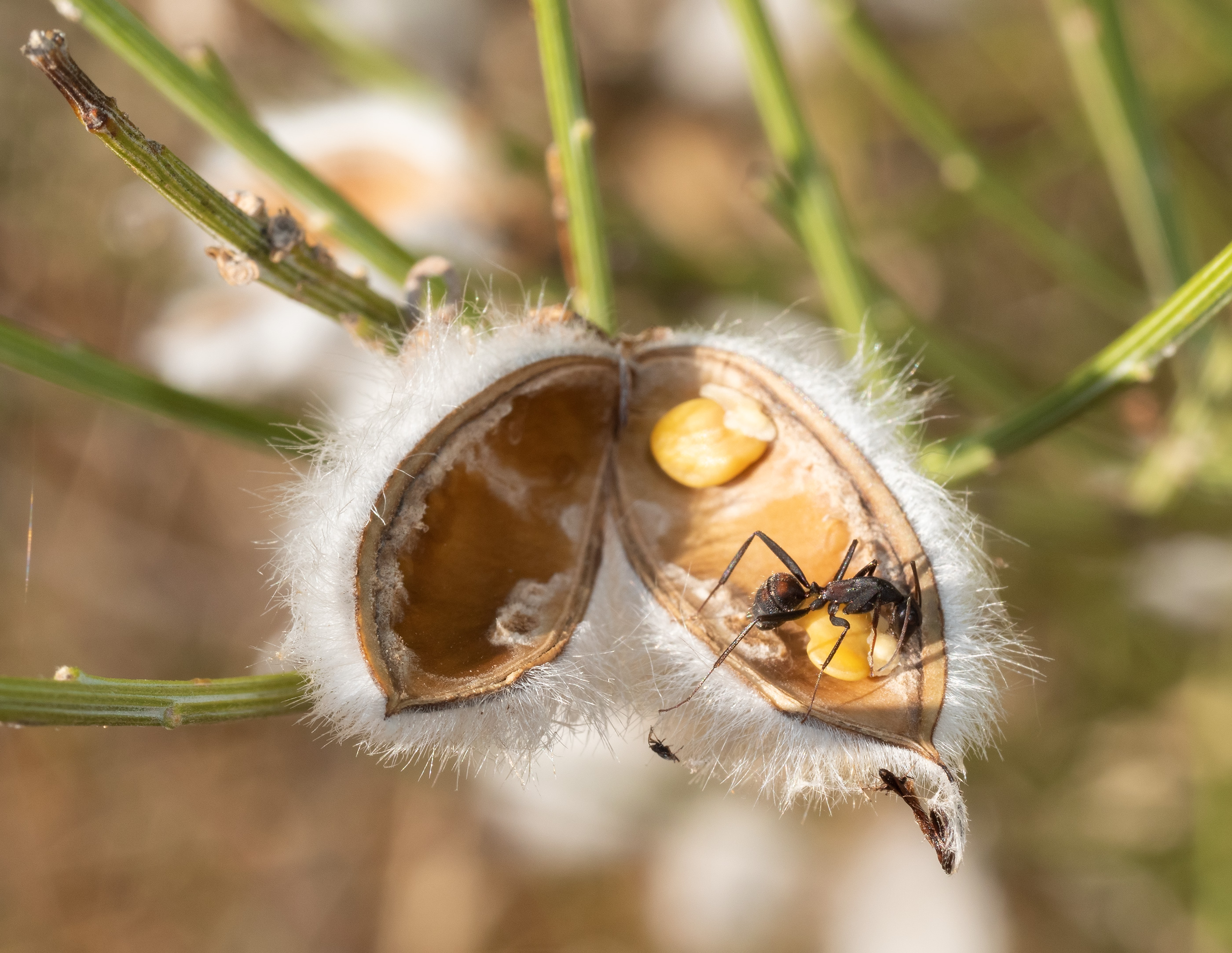
Camponotus cf. cruentatus on an open fruit of Cytisus striatus

It is also known in other parts of the world as an introduced species. Its first recorded cultivation was in Great Britain in 1816; it has become locally naturalised, particularly in central and southern England, but also recorded at scattered localities in Wales and Scotland. It was introduced to California in the 1960s as an erosion-controlling plant, but it escaped and spread to become a major noxious weed, an invasive species colonising in many habitats there causing problems in many ways, including displacement of native species causing ecosystem degradation and loss, removing native plant food sources for wildlife, and a susceptibility to wildfire ignition and spread. It is also caused ecological damage in Oregon. In North America, it is mostly found in California and Oregon, where its ecological behaviour is similar to C. scoparius, establishing dense monocultures that alter soil composition and fire dynamics.

Due to its adaptability and nitrogen-fixing ability, it can dominate disturbed habitats and colonise open areas rapidly. The California Department of Food and Agriculture (CDFA) lists brooms as Class C pest species, while the California Exotic Plant Pest Council (CalEPPC) categorizes Cytisus scoparius and Cytisus striatus as List A invasive species, reflecting their aggressive spread and ecological impact.

Outside its native range, Cytisus striatus can form dense, monospecific thickets that displace native vegetation, restrict wildlife movement, and substantially increase fire hazard due to high above-ground biomass and litter accumulation. These large fuel loads increase the risk of rural fires, which are difficult to control due to the shrub's rapid regrowth. Researchers suggested converting its biomass into pellets to prevent cutting or burning of the plants, which can reduce the wildfire risk and the cost of shrub clearing.

Field observations also show that C. striatus tends to proliferate near forest plantations and disturbed soils, suggesting that anthropogenic activity facilitates its persistence and spread.

In introduced regions such as the western United States, C. striatus readily colonises open or disturbed habitats, particularly in Mediterranean-type climates. It competes with native plant communities and regenerates rapidly after fire or mechanical clearing. In California, broom species are classified as Class C pest plants by the California Department of Food and Agriculture (CDFA), while C. striatus and C. scoparius are further designated as List A invasive species by the California Invasive Plant Council (Cal-IPC), reflecting their aggressive spread and ecological impact.

Control strategies include manual and mechanical removal, herbicide application, and prescribed burning, though these are costly and require long-term maintenance to prevent re-establishment. Recent research has proposed that sustainable management could be supported through biomass use or bioactive compound extraction, creating economic incentives for removal while reducing ecological damage.

Potential applications include using residual materials for biomass pellets or torrefied biomass, which could also promote a circular economy. This study aims to study C. striatus biomass properties for potential pellet production and evaluate the resulting pellets against ENPlus quality standards. Initial tests involved shredding and drying the biomass to optimise particle size before pelletisation, highlighting the need for proper processing techniques to ensure quality and efficiency in the biomass production.

Leonel Nunes' study on biomass properties for pellet production indicated lower-density chips compared to other species, raising concerns over their energy value.

== Phytochemistry and bioactive compounds ==
Chemical analyses of flowers and fruits indicate significant nutritional and phytochemical value. The flowers contain approximately 21% protein, 18% fibre, and 2% lipids. The fruits contain 12% protein, 42% fibre, and 1% lipids. Both are rich in potassium, calcium, phosphorus, and magnesium, with no detectable cytotoxicity in cell assays.

Extracts from C. striatus contain isoflavonoids that act as antibiotic adjuvants against methicillin-resistant Staphylococcus aureus (MRSA). These compounds are only moderately antimicrobial on their own but enhance the activity of ciprofloxacin and erythromycin by interfering with bacterial resistance mechanisms.

The plant also exhibits antioxidant and anti-inflammatory properties attributed to its phenolic content, including flavonoids, saponins, and alkaloids.

== Uses ==
Historically, Portuguese broom was used for thatching, broom-making, animal fodder, and as a soil improver due to its nitrogen-fixing capabilities. Its flowers have been used in folk medicine for treating rheumatism, gout, hypotension, and liver disorders.

In modern research, the species has been tested for phytoremediation, particularly in soils contaminated with hexachlorocyclohexane (HCH) isomers. When inoculated with specific rhizobacterial strains, C. striatus demonstrated enhanced growth and pollutant degradation, suggesting potential for use in environmental cleanup.
