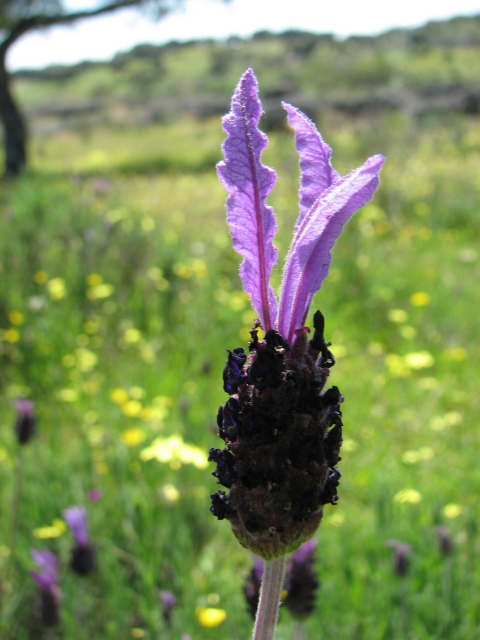

Scientific classification
- Kingdom: Plantae
- Clade: Tracheophytes
- Clade: Angiosperms
- Clade: Eudicots
- Clade: Asterids
- Order: Lamiales
- Family: Lamiaceae
- Genus: Lavandula
- Species: L. pedunculata

Binomial name
- Lavandula pedunculata (Mill.) Cav.

Synonyms
- Lavandula stoechas subsp. pedunculata (Mill.) Samp. ex Rozeira; Lavandula stoechas var. pedunculata (Mill.) Lundmark; Stoechas pedunculata Mill.

= Lavandula pedunculata =

Species of plant

Lavandula pedunculata, commonly called Spanish Lavender or French lavender, is a species of flowering plant in the family Lamiaceae. It is known for the tuft of two or three butterfly-like, narrow petals that emerge from the top of its ovoid head. L. pedunculata is native to Iberia, Morocco and western Turkey.

== Description ==
L. pedunculata is a bushy evergreen shrub with narrow, grey-green, aromatic leaves and small dark-purple flowers in long-stalked, dense heads tipped with large purple bracts.

== Subspecies ==
There are five subspecies of L. pedunculata:

- Lavandula pedunculata subsp. atlantica (Braun-Blanq.) Romo
- Lavandula pedunculata subsp. cariensis (Boiss.) Upson & S.Andrews
- Lavandula pedunculata subsp. lusitanica (Chaytor) Franco
- Lavandula pedunculata subsp. pedunculata
- Lavandula pedunculata subsp. sampaiana (Rozeira) Franco
