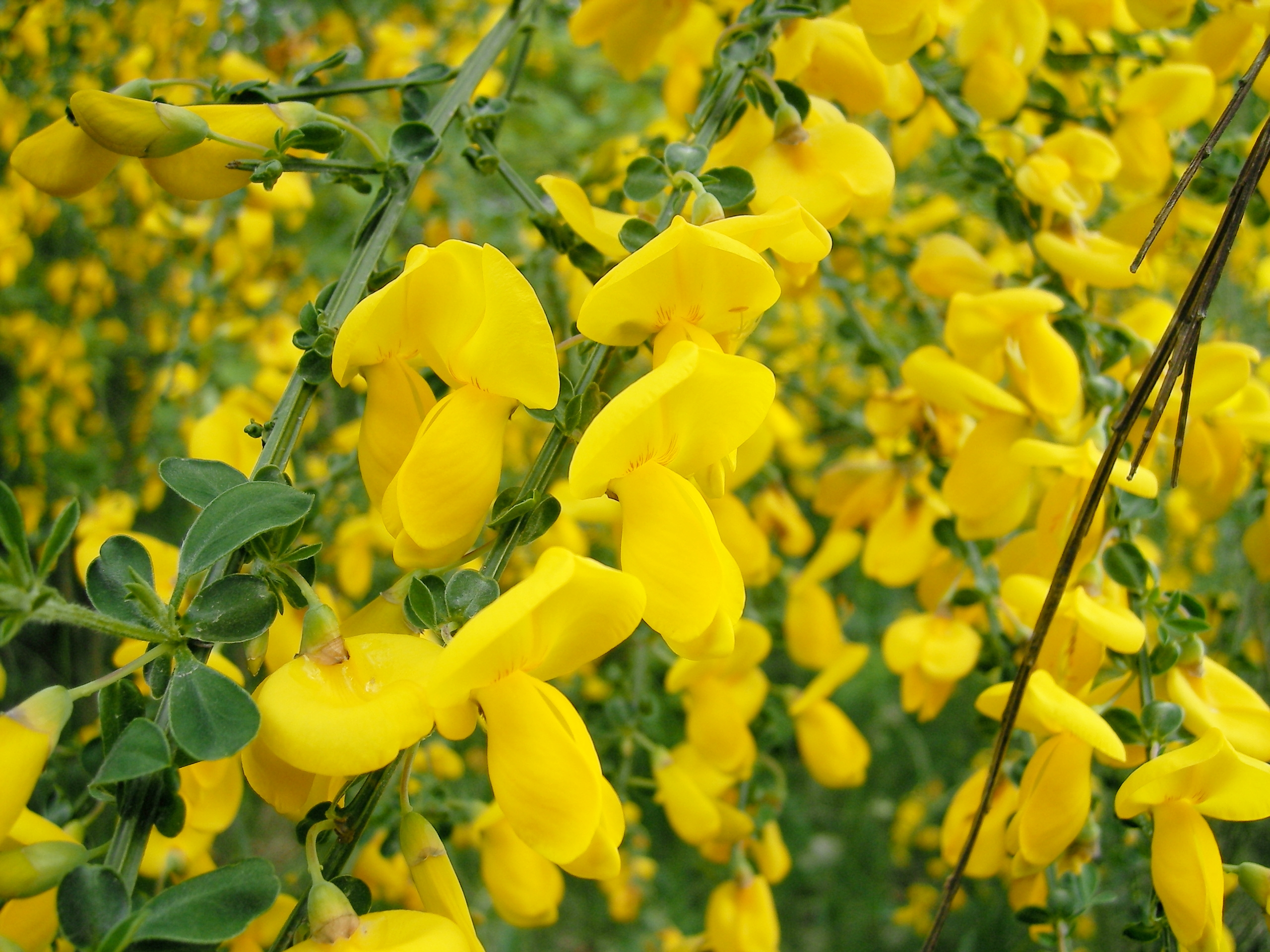
- Cytisus scoparius

Scientific classification
- Kingdom: Plantae
- Clade: Tracheophytes
- Clade: Angiosperms
- Clade: Eudicots
- Clade: Rosids
- Order: Fabales
- Family: Fabaceae
- Subfamily: Faboideae
- Clade: Core Genistoids
- Tribe: Genisteae
- Genus: Cytisus; Desf. (1798), nom. cons.

Synonyms
- Chronanthos K.Koch (1853); Corothamnus (W.D.J.Koch) C.Presl (1844); Cytisogenista Duhamel (1755), nom. rej.; Lembotropis Griseb. (1843); Meiemianthera Raf. (1838); Nubigena Raf. (1838); Peyssonelia Boivin ex Webb & Berthel. (1842); Sarothamnus Wimm. (1832); Scaligera Adans. (1763); Spartocytisus Webb & Berthel. (1842); Spartotamnus Webb & Berthel. ex C.Presl (1844); Verzinum Raf. (1838)

= Cytisus =

Genus of legumes

Cytisus is a genus of flowering plants in the family Fabaceae, native to open sites (typically scrub and heathland) in Europe, western Asia and North Africa. It belongs to the subfamily Faboideae, and is one of several genera in the tribe Genisteae which are commonly called brooms. They are shrubs producing masses of brightly coloured, pea-like flowers, often highly fragrant. Members of the segregate genera Calicotome, Chamaecytisus, and Lembotropis are sometimes included in Cytisus.

== Species ==
As of August 2025, Kew's Plants of the World Online accepted the following species and natural hybrids:

- Cytisus acutangulus Jaub. & Spach
- Cytisus aeolicus Guss.
- Cytisus agnipilus Velen.
- Cytisus anatolicus (Güner) Vural
- Cytisus arboreus (Desf.) DC.
- Cytisus ardoinoi E.Fourn.
- Cytisus balansae (Boiss.) Ball
- Cytisus cantabricus (Willk.) Rchb.f. & Beck
- Cytisus × cetius Beck
- Cytisus commutatus (Willk.) Briq.
- Cytisus decumbens (Durande) Spach
- Cytisus dieckii (Lange) Fern.Prieto, Nava, Fern.Casado, M.Herrera, Bueno Sánchez, Sa
- Cytisus emeriflorus Rchb.
- Cytisus filipes Webb
- Cytisus fontanesii Spach ex Ball
- Cytisus grandiflorus DC.
- Cytisus gueneri (H.Duman, Ba?er & Malyer) Vural
- Cytisus kerneri Błocki
- Cytisus lotoides Pourr.
- Cytisus malacitanus Boiss.
- Cytisus × millenii Borbás
- Cytisus multiflorus (L'Hér.) Sweet
- Cytisus nigricans L.
- Cytisus orientalis Loisel.
- Cytisus oromediterraneus Rivas Mart. & al.
- Cytisus osyrioides Svent.
- Cytisus procumbens (Waldst. & Kit. ex Willd.) Spreng.
- Cytisus proteus Zumagl.
- Cytisus scoparius (L.) Link
- Cytisus striatus (Hill) Rothm.
- Cytisus supranubius (L.f.) Kuntze
- Cytisus × versicolor Dippel
- Cytisus villosus Pourr.

=== Award of Garden Merit cultivars ===
Species have been widely cultivated and hybridised, and the following cultivars have gained the Royal Horticultural Society's Award of Garden Merit:

- Cytisus × beanii
- Cytisus × boskoopii 'Boskoop Ruby' (deep crimson flowers,)
- Cytisus × boskoopii 'Zeelandia' (lilac, pink and cream flowers,)
- Cytisus 'Burkwoodii' (cerise red or crimson red and yellow edged flowers,)
- Cytisus 'Hollandia' (red and pale cream flowers,)
- Cytisus × kewensis (Cytisus ardoinii × Cytisus multiflorus; small, prostrate shrub with cream flowers)
- Cytisus 'Lena'
- Cytisus nigricans 'Cyni'
- Cytisus × praecox 'Allgold' (yellow flowers)
- Cytisus × praecox 'Warminster' (pale yellow flowers)
