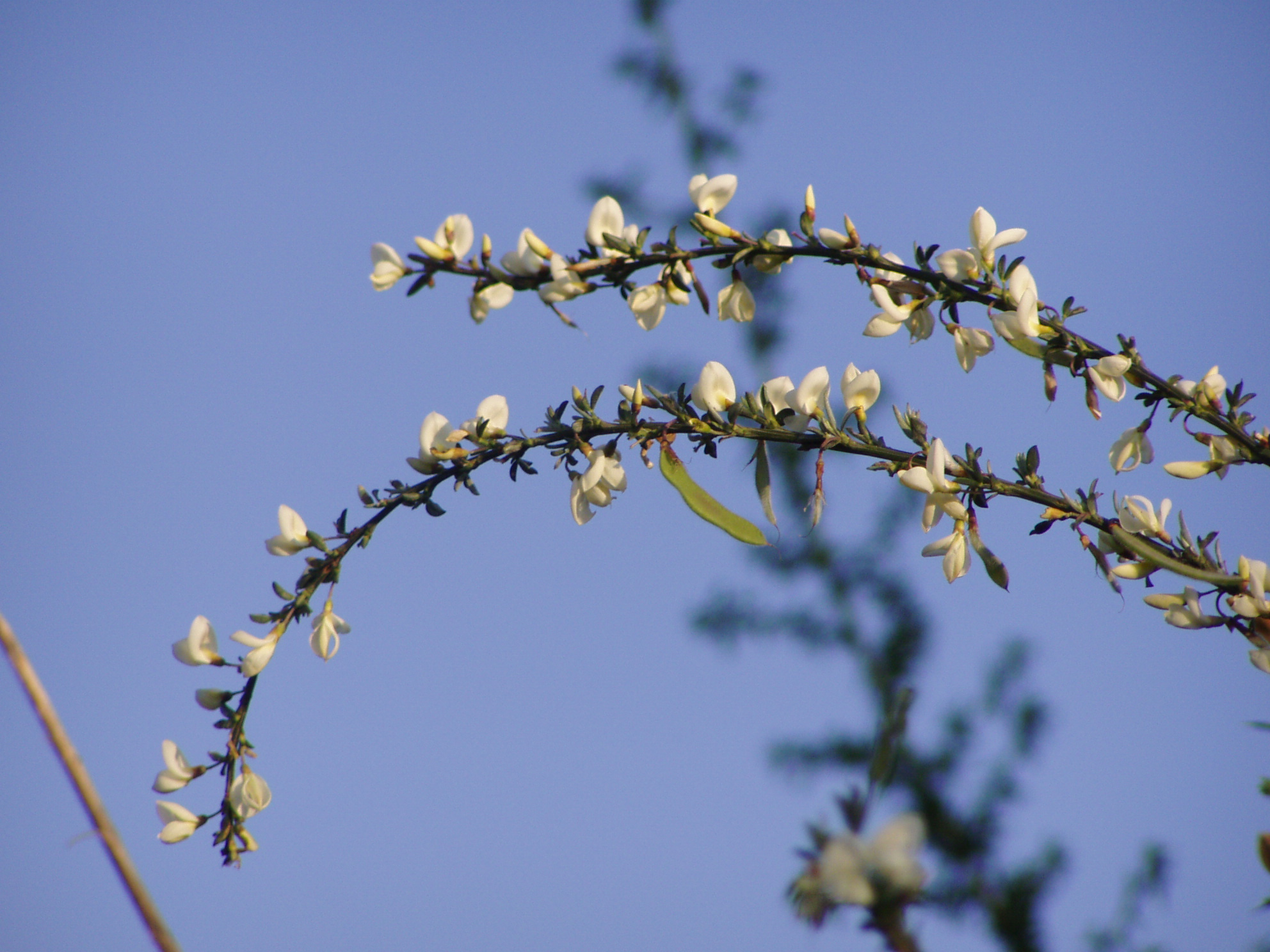

Conservation status
- Least Concern (IUCN 3.1)

Scientific classification
- Kingdom: Plantae
- Clade: Tracheophytes
- Clade: Angiosperms
- Clade: Eudicots
- Clade: Rosids
- Order: Fabales
- Family: Fabaceae
- Subfamily: Faboideae
- Genus: Cytisus
- Species: C. multiflorus

Binomial name
- Cytisus multiflorus (L'Hér.) Sweet

Synonyms
- List: Cytisus albus (Lam.) Link; Cytisus lusitanicus Willk.; Genista alba Lam.; Genista madagascariensis Baker; Spartium multiflorum L'Her.

= Cytisus multiflorus =

Species of legume

Cytisus multiflorus is a species of legume known by the common names white broom, white spanishbroom and Portuguese broom.

== Distribution ==
It is native to the Iberian Peninsula, especially frequent in the western half in central and northern interior Portugal and central and northern western Spain. It is better known as an introduced species on other continents, including Australia and North America, where it has become a weed in agricultural land and an invasive species in natural habitats.

== Description ==
Cytisus multiflorus is a shrub growing up to 0.8 metres (2 ft 7 in) or 1.5 metres (4 ft 11 in) in sprawling height, with a broomlike array of many five-angled flexible branches. Leaves appear mainly on lower branches, each made up of three leaflets. Some leaves grow on the upper branches; these are generally made up of a single leaflet. Each leaflet is under a centimeter long and may be linear to oblong in shape and coated in soft silvery hairs.

The white, pea-like flower is up to a centimeter long and is often marked with a dark pinkish streak near the base. The fruit is a hairy legume pod up to 3 centimetres (1.2 in) long. The pods turn black with age and dehisce explosively to release their four to six seeds away from the parent plant.

== Invasive species ==
This plant is a serious noxious weed of agricultural fields and a colonizing invasive plant in wild lands in parts of Australia and California, where it was first introduced as an ornamental shrub for its prolific white flowers. It is still sometimes grown and sold for landscaping purposes despite its status as a pest plant, with new industry and public education programs resulting.

== Gallery ==
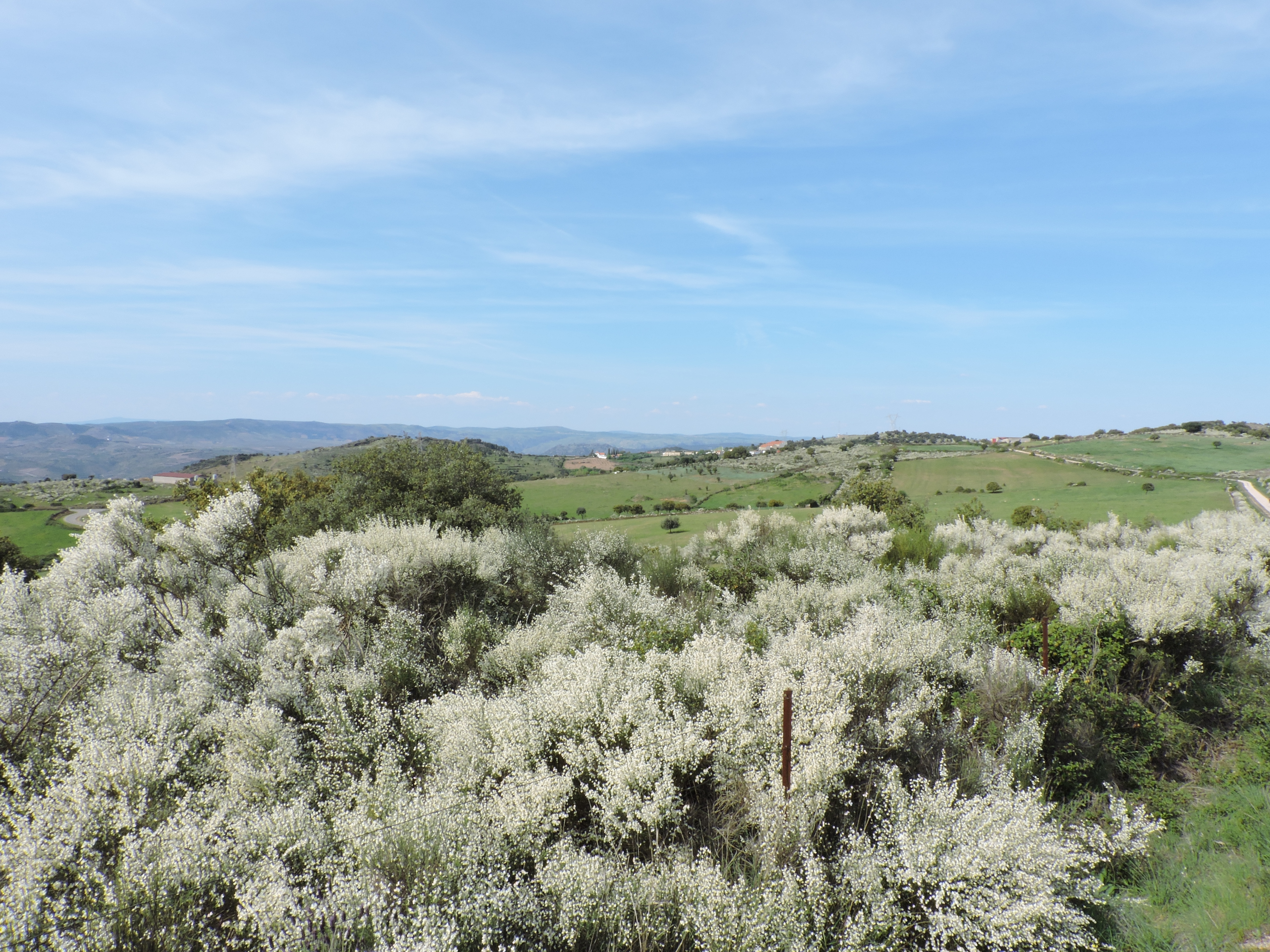

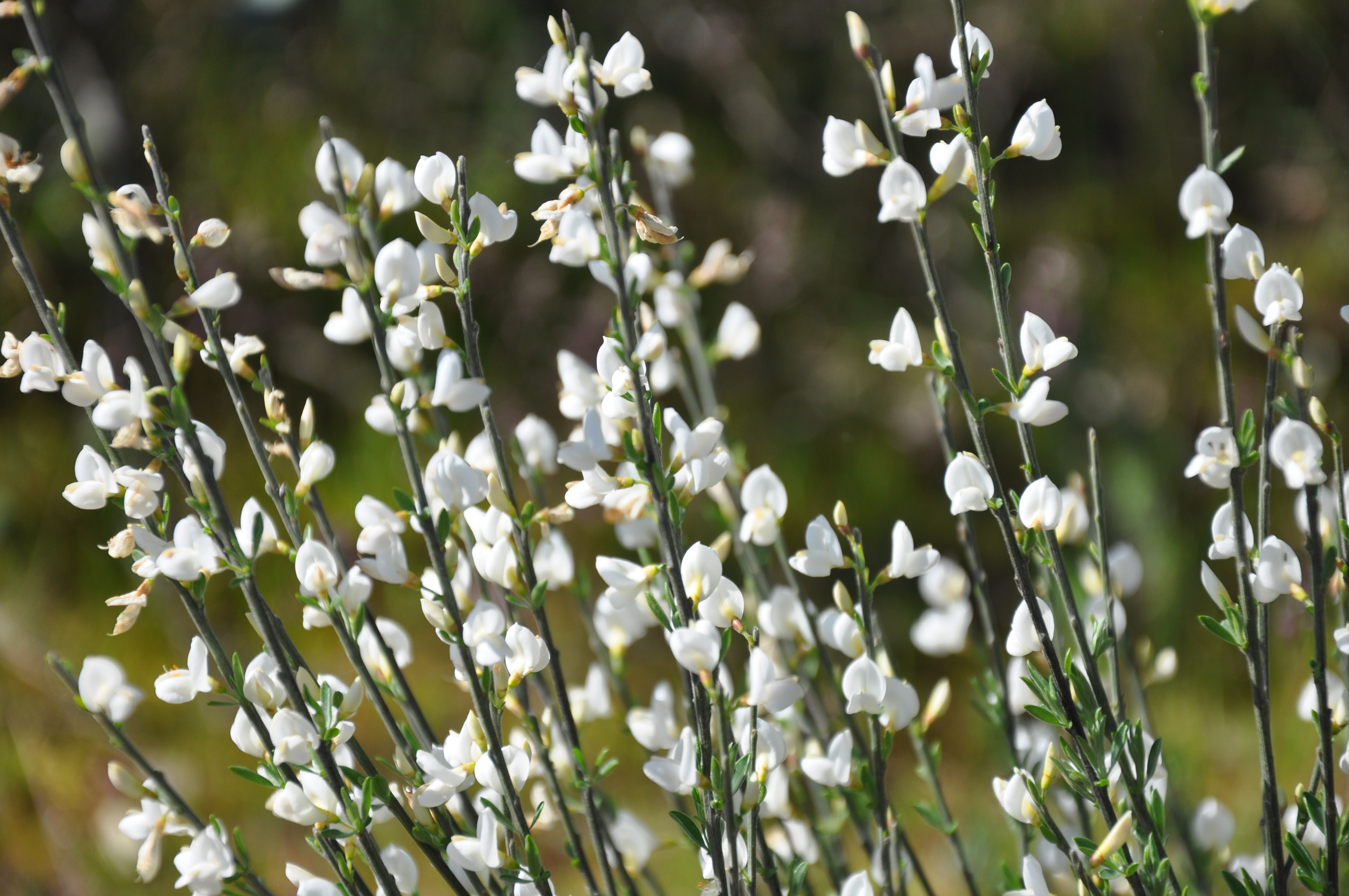

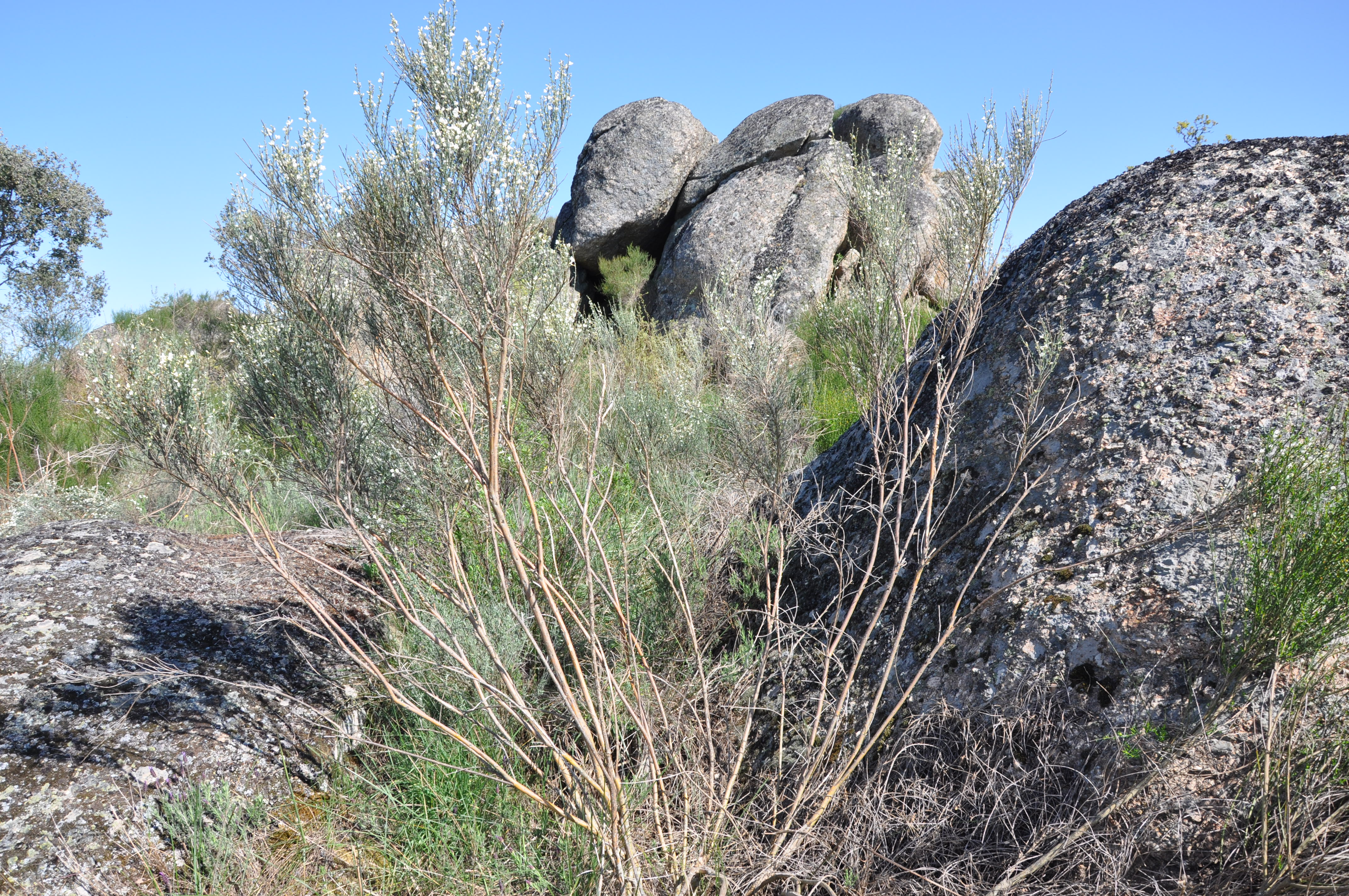

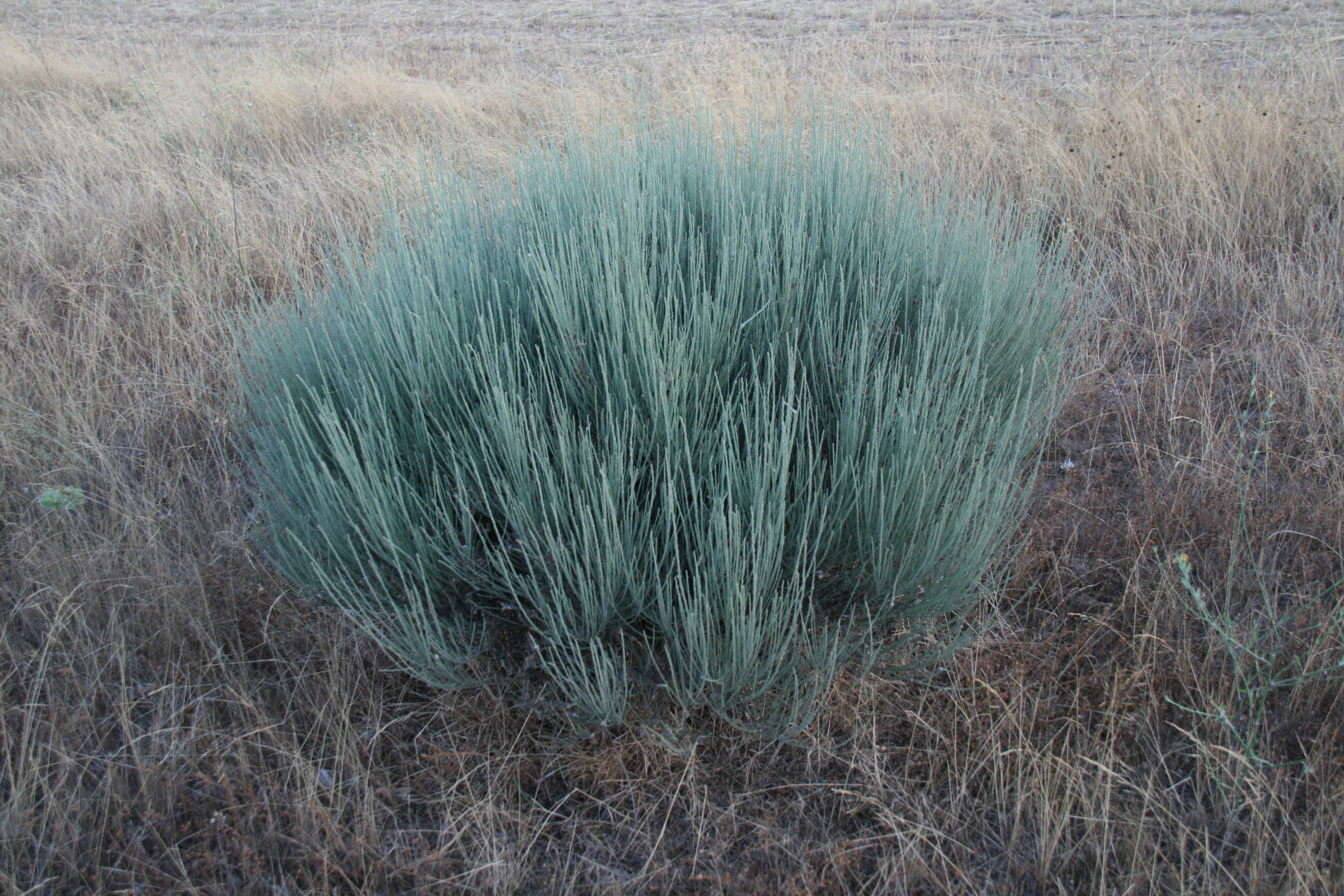
