= Atractotomus cooperi =

Scientific classification
- Kingdom: Animalia
- Phylum: Arthropoda
- Class: Insecta
- Order: Hemiptera
- Suborder: Heteroptera
- Family: Miridae
- Tribe: Nasocorini
- Genus: Atractotomus
- Species: A. cooperi

Binomial name
- Atractotomus cooperi Stonedahl, 1990

Species of true bug

Atractotomus cooperi is a species of plant bug in the family Miridae. It is found in North America.
