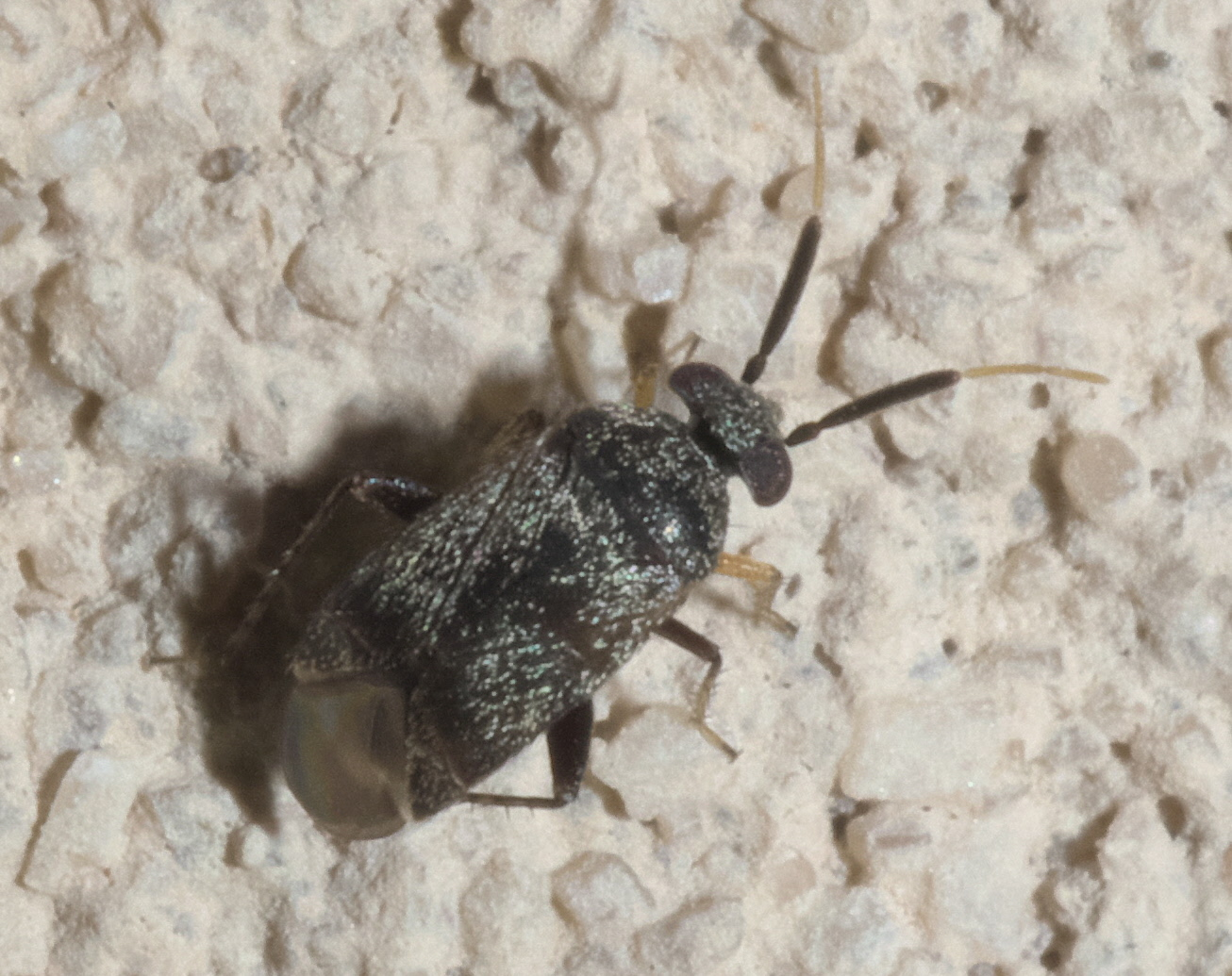

Scientific classification
- Kingdom: Animalia
- Phylum: Arthropoda
- Class: Insecta
- Order: Hemiptera
- Suborder: Heteroptera
- Family: Miridae
- Tribe: Nasocorini
- Genus: Rhinacloa
- Species: R. forticornis

Binomial name
- Rhinacloa forticornis Reuter, 1876

= Rhinacloa forticornis =

Species of true bug

Rhinacloa forticornis, the western plant bug, is a species of plant bug in the family Miridae. It is found in the Caribbean Sea, Central America, North America, Oceania, and South America.
