= Rhinacloa callicrates =

Scientific classification
- Kingdom: Animalia
- Phylum: Arthropoda
- Class: Insecta
- Order: Hemiptera
- Suborder: Heteroptera
- Family: Miridae
- Tribe: Nasocorini
- Genus: Rhinacloa
- Species: R. callicrates

Binomial name
- Rhinacloa callicrates Herring, 1971

Species of true bug

Rhinacloa callicrates is a species of plant bug in the family Miridae. It is found in Central America and North America.
