= Atractotomus nicholi =

Scientific classification
- Kingdom: Animalia
- Phylum: Arthropoda
- Class: Insecta
- Order: Hemiptera
- Suborder: Heteroptera
- Family: Miridae
- Tribe: Nasocorini
- Genus: Atractotomus
- Species: A. nicholi

Binomial name
- Atractotomus nicholi (Knight, 1968)

Synonyms
- Lepidopsallus nicholi Knight, 1968

Species of true bug

Atractotomus nicholi is a species of plant bug in the family Miridae. It is found in North America.
