= Chlamydatus associatus =

Scientific classification
- Kingdom: Animalia
- Phylum: Arthropoda
- Class: Insecta
- Order: Hemiptera
- Suborder: Heteroptera
- Family: Miridae
- Tribe: Nasocorini
- Genus: Chlamydatus
- Species: C. associatus

Binomial name
- Chlamydatus associatus (Uhler, 1872)

Species of true bug

Chlamydatus associatus, the ragweed plant bug, is a species of plant bug in the family Miridae. It is found in Central America and North America.
