= Atractotomus rubidus =

Scientific classification
- Kingdom: Animalia
- Phylum: Arthropoda
- Class: Insecta
- Order: Hemiptera
- Suborder: Heteroptera
- Family: Miridae
- Tribe: Nasocorini
- Genus: Atractotomus
- Species: A. rubidus

Binomial name
- Atractotomus rubidus (Uhler, 1895)

Synonyms
- Lepidopsallus rubidus (Uhler, 1895); Sthenarus rubidus Uhler, 1895

Species of true bug

Atractotomus rubidus is a species of plant bug in the family of Miridae. It is found in North America.
