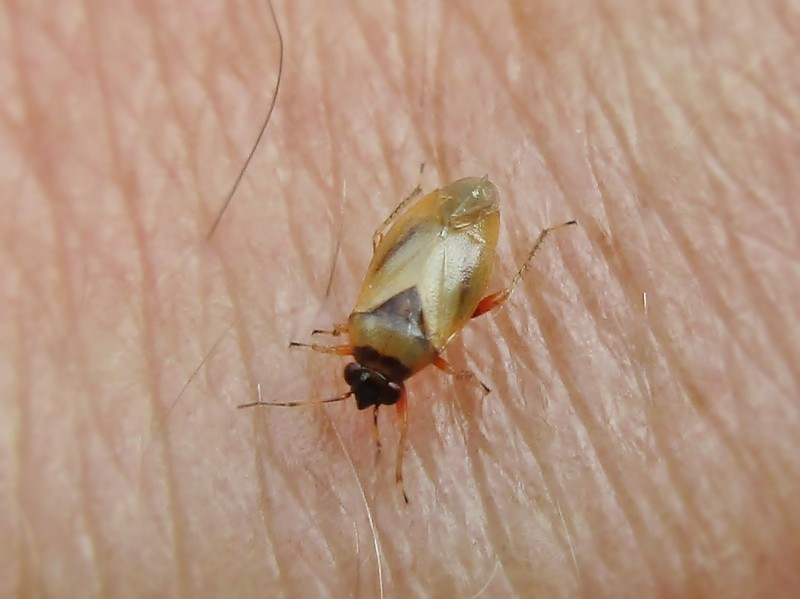
- Salicarus roseri, the Netherlands

Scientific classification
- Kingdom: Animalia
- Phylum: Arthropoda
- Class: Insecta
- Order: Hemiptera
- Suborder: Heteroptera
- Family: Miridae
- Tribe: Nasocorini
- Genus: Salicarus; Kerzhner, 1962

= Salicarus =

Genus of true bugs

Salicarus is a genus of true bugs belonging to the family Miridae, named by Izyaslav Moiseyevich Kerzhner in 1962. Their most notable feature is their scale like setae. This genus comprises nine species with a wide distribution range, ranging from the Mediterranean to Central Asia. They usually can be found near sallow and willow trees, in wetland habitats.

== Taxonomy ==
Salicarus belongs to the Miridae family. It is placed in the tribe Nasocorini along with other genera such as Phoenicocoris and Chinacapsus. In the past, authors have placed Salicarus in this tribe because of a common row of species on the dorsal distal margin of the hind femur that it shared with many other Miridae. Most recently, the justification for their placement into Nasocorini is their small size, scalelike setae, and rudimentary endosoma.

The genus is known for its complicated and elaborate taxonomic history. It was first created by Kerzhner in 1962 as a monotypic genus for S. roseri, in an attempt to more clearly delimit the genus. There has been a lot of back and forth between multiple authors throughout many decades about the true extent of members within the Salicarus genus.

For example, researchers were looking into putting an insect named Sthenarus fuscicornis into Salicarus because of features such as its second antennal segment and tarsus. However, they ultimately decided against it because it lacked the scale like hairs that the rest of the Salicarus genus had, instead using its head structure to transfer this species into the genus Campylomma.

Another point of interest for researchers is the relationship between Salicarus and the genus Phoenicocoris. The species placed in Salicarus are known to have a similar vesical (eversible sheaths in the genitalia) structure compared to Phoenicocoris but the main difference is that the vesicae of Salicarus species is slightly larger and not as tightly coiled. However, there still have been instances where Phoenicocoris species have been moved to the genus Salicarus, like the example of Phoenicocoris flagellatus. Because of the similarities in head structure, most notably the elevated transverse basal carina, researchers consider flagellatus a junior synonym of Salicarus fulvicornis.

The most recent update to the Salicarus genus is a phylogenetic study done on the genus Heterocapillus which led to four species getting transferred to Salicarus. There are currently 9 species placed in Salicarus.

Within Salicarus, species groups have been created to further group the species within the genus together, based on a variety of morphological traits. The Salicarus nitidus group includes: S. cavinotum (Wagner, 1973), S. genistae (Lindberg, 1948), S. nitidus (Horváth, 1905), and S. perpusillus (Wagner, 1960). The Salicarus roseri group includes: S. concinnus V. G. Putshkov, 1977 , S. roseriI (Herrich-Schaeffer, 1838), and S. urnammu Linnavuori, 1984. Lastly, the Salicarus fulviornis group includes: S. halimodendri V. G. Putshkov, 1977 and S. fulviornis (Jakovlev, 1889).

== Description ==
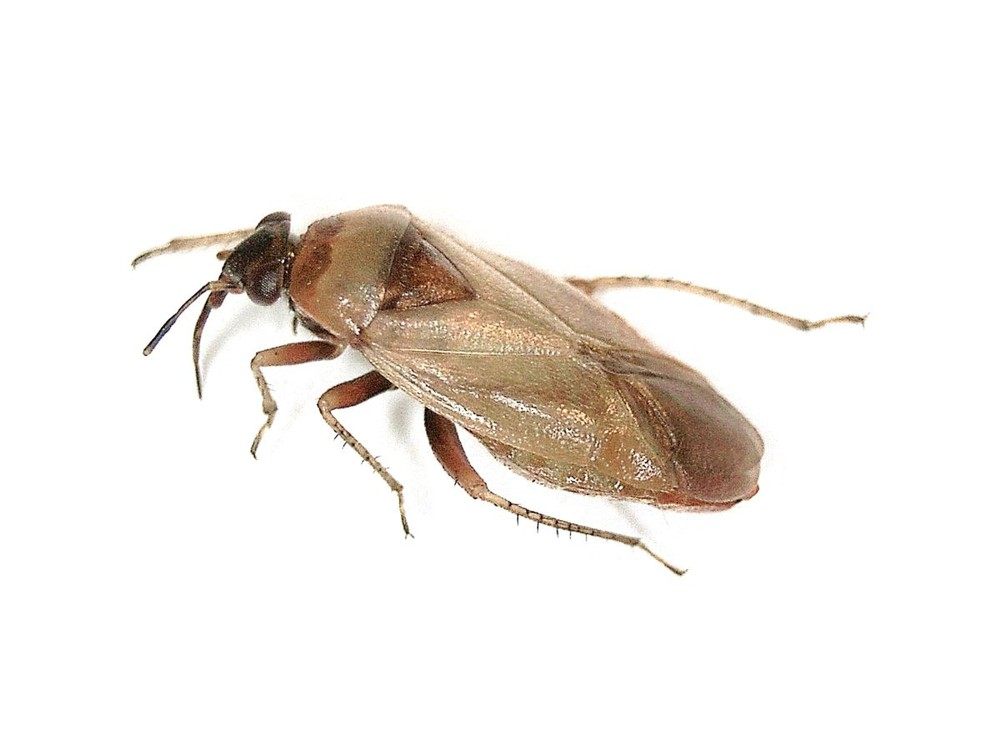
Salicarus roseri

Salicarus are small insects generally ranging from 2 to 4 mm in length. Their body can range from broadly oval to elongate oval, but they usually have short appendages. Their bodies are covered in a mixture of simple and scale-like setae. They have flattened heads and the posterior margin of the vertex covers the anterior part of the pronotum. Species of Salicarus may exhibit strong intraspecific variation, ranging from dark brown to pale yellow. For males, their vesica is large and strongly coiled around the middle area, and it features two long, thin, fused apical blades. For females, their vestibulum is characteristically long, thin, and S-shaped. Members of the S. nitidus group are most easily identified by its antennal segments. The first and second segments are strongly swollen, and the second antennomere is spindle shaped. Members of the S. roseri group can be identified by their distinctive knife-shaped vesica apical blades on their genitalia. Members of the S. fulvicornis species group is recognized by simple, dense setae, about 1.5x the length of the scale-like setae.

== Life cycle and behavior ==
Salicarus insects are univoltine, with overwintering eggs. In Britain, adults can be found from mid-June to August. Salicarus lay eggs in the wood of sallow and willow. Most Salicarus are oligophagous, but the species within the S. fulvicornis group are monophagous. Interestingly, some Salicarus, like S. roseri, are known to be predators of aphids. When there was a study conducted on heteroptera light attraction, Salicarus was included and it was observed that they are attracted to the white light in a trap, and interestingly, they did not respond to the ultraviolet light trap where white light was absent.

== Habitat ==
Salicarus species are known as mesophiles, usually thriving in moderate temperatures that’s not too cold or hot. There are records of them being found in river valleys, and they can generally be found in wetland habitats. Salicarus species also utilize a wide range of host plants, depending on their classified species group. Species in the S. nitidus group use legumes of the tribe Genisteae as hosts, which includes the plant genuses Genista, Calicotome, and Echinospartum. Species in the S. roseri group feed on Salix plants. Lastly, species in the S. fulvicornis group only eat Caragana plants.

== Historic and current distribution ==
Each species group of Salicarus has different geographic distributions associated with them. Members of the roseri species group has a Palearctic distribution. An example of an area where S. concinnus can be found in Central Asia is the Uygur district in Kazakhstan. Members of the nitidus group have a Mediterranean distribution. Members of the fulvicornis group are mainly found in Central Asia and Mongolia.

== Species list ==
According to the most recent genus review, there are currently 9 species in the Salicarus genus.

- S. cavinotum (Wagner, 1973)
- S. concinnus V. G. Putshkov, 1977
- S. fulviornis (Jakovlev, 1889).
- S. genistae (Lindberg, 1948)
- S. halimodendri V. G. Putshkov, 1977
- S. nitidus (Horváth, 1905)
- S. perpusillus (Wagner, 1960)
- S. roseriI (Herrich-Schaeffer, 1838)
- S. urnammu Linnavuori, 1984
