= Chlamydatus obliquus =

Scientific classification
- Kingdom: Animalia
- Phylum: Arthropoda
- Class: Insecta
- Order: Hemiptera
- Suborder: Heteroptera
- Family: Miridae
- Tribe: Nasocorini
- Genus: Chlamydatus
- Species: C. obliquus

Binomial name
- Chlamydatus obliquus (Uhler, 1893)

Species of true bug

Chlamydatus obliquus is a species of plant bug in the family Miridae. It is found in North America.
