= Atractotomus balli =

Scientific classification
- Kingdom: Animalia
- Phylum: Arthropoda
- Class: Insecta
- Order: Hemiptera
- Suborder: Heteroptera
- Family: Miridae
- Tribe: Nasocorini
- Genus: Atractotomus
- Species: A. balli

Binomial name
- Atractotomus balli Knight, 1931

Species of true bug

Atractotomus balli is a species of plant bug in the family Miridae.
