= Campylognathus =

Campylognathus may refer to:

- Campylocephalus, a genus of eurypterid once described as Campylognathus.
- Campylognathoides, a genus of pterosaur originally described as Campylognathus.
- Campylognathus, synonym of the genus of plant bug Maurodactylus.
