= Atractotomus acaciae =

Scientific classification
- Kingdom: Animalia
- Phylum: Arthropoda
- Class: Insecta
- Order: Hemiptera
- Suborder: Heteroptera
- Family: Miridae
- Tribe: Nasocorini
- Genus: Atractotomus
- Species: A. acaciae

Binomial name
- Atractotomus acaciae Knight, 1925

Species of true bug

Atractotomus acaciae is a species of plant bug in the family Miridae. It is found in Central America and North America.
