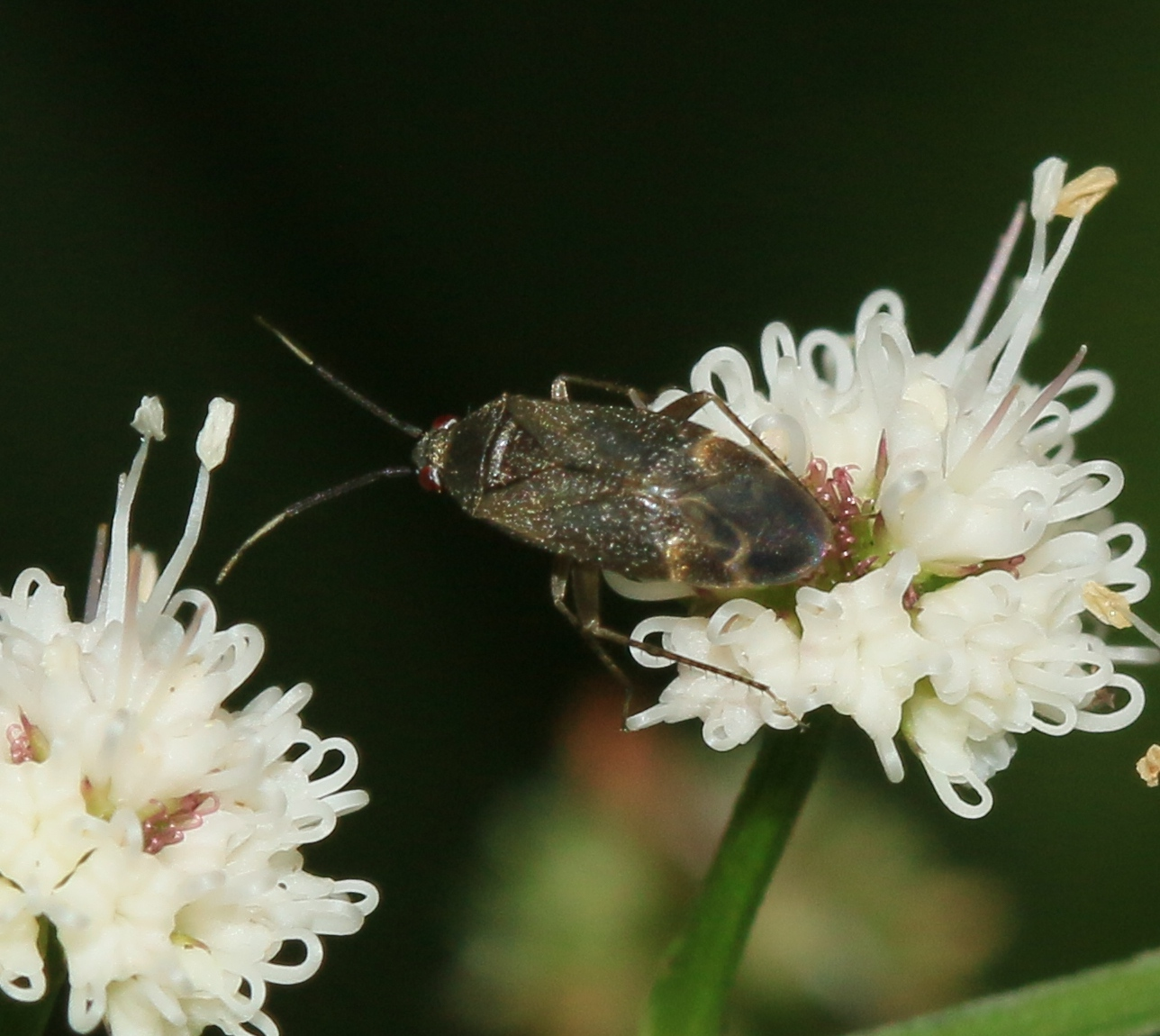

Scientific classification
- Kingdom: Animalia
- Phylum: Arthropoda
- Class: Insecta
- Order: Hemiptera
- Suborder: Heteroptera
- Family: Miridae
- Genus: Atractotomus
- Species: A. magnicornis

Binomial name
- Atractotomus magnicornis (Fallén, 1807)

Synonyms
- Capsus magnicornis Fallén, 1807

= Atractotomus magnicornis =

Species of true bug

Atractotomus magnicornis is a species of plant bug in the family Miridae. It is found in Europe and North America.

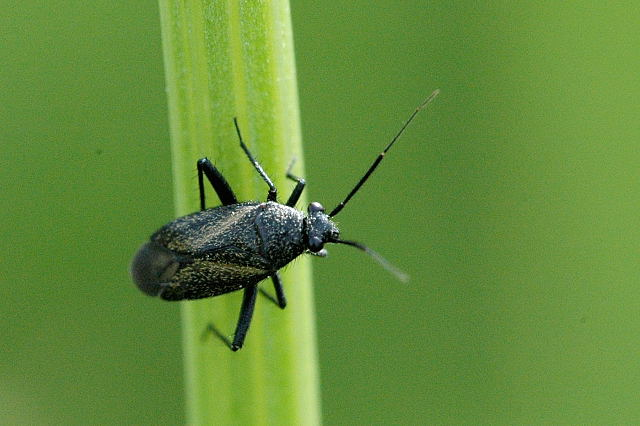

== Subspecies ==
These two subspecies belong to the species Atractotomus magnicornis:

- Atractotomus magnicornis buenoi Knight, 1923^{i}
- Atractotomus magnicornis magnicornis (Fallén, 1807)^{i}

Data sources: i = ITIS, c = Catalogue of Life, g = GBIF, b = Bugguide.net

== Biology ==
Atractotomus kolenatii lives predominantly on common spruce (Picea abies ), they are more rarely found on other coniferous trees such as Abies, Pinus, Larix, Juniperus' communis and Thuja. They are zoophytophagus, sucking on the needles and buds of their host trees, as well as on aphids and Psocoptera. Adults can be observed from late June to September. They occur every year in one generation.
