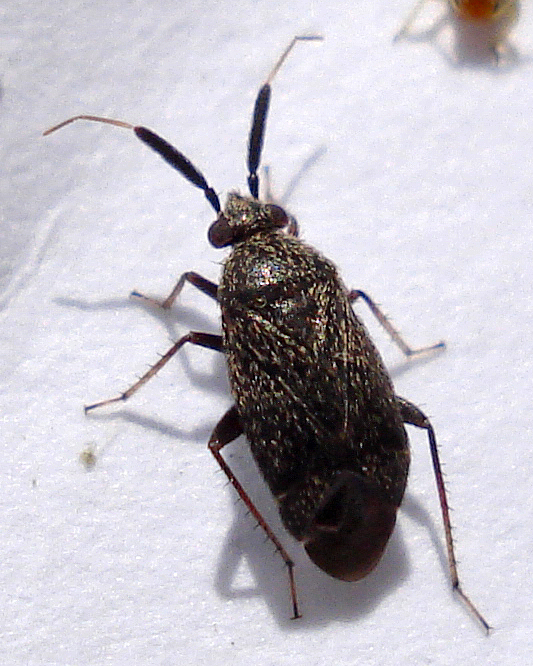

Scientific classification
- Kingdom: Animalia
- Phylum: Arthropoda
- Class: Insecta
- Order: Hemiptera
- Suborder: Heteroptera
- Family: Miridae
- Genus: Atractotomus
- Species: A. mali

Binomial name
- Atractotomus mali (Meyer-Dür, 1843)

= Atractotomus mali =

Species of true bug

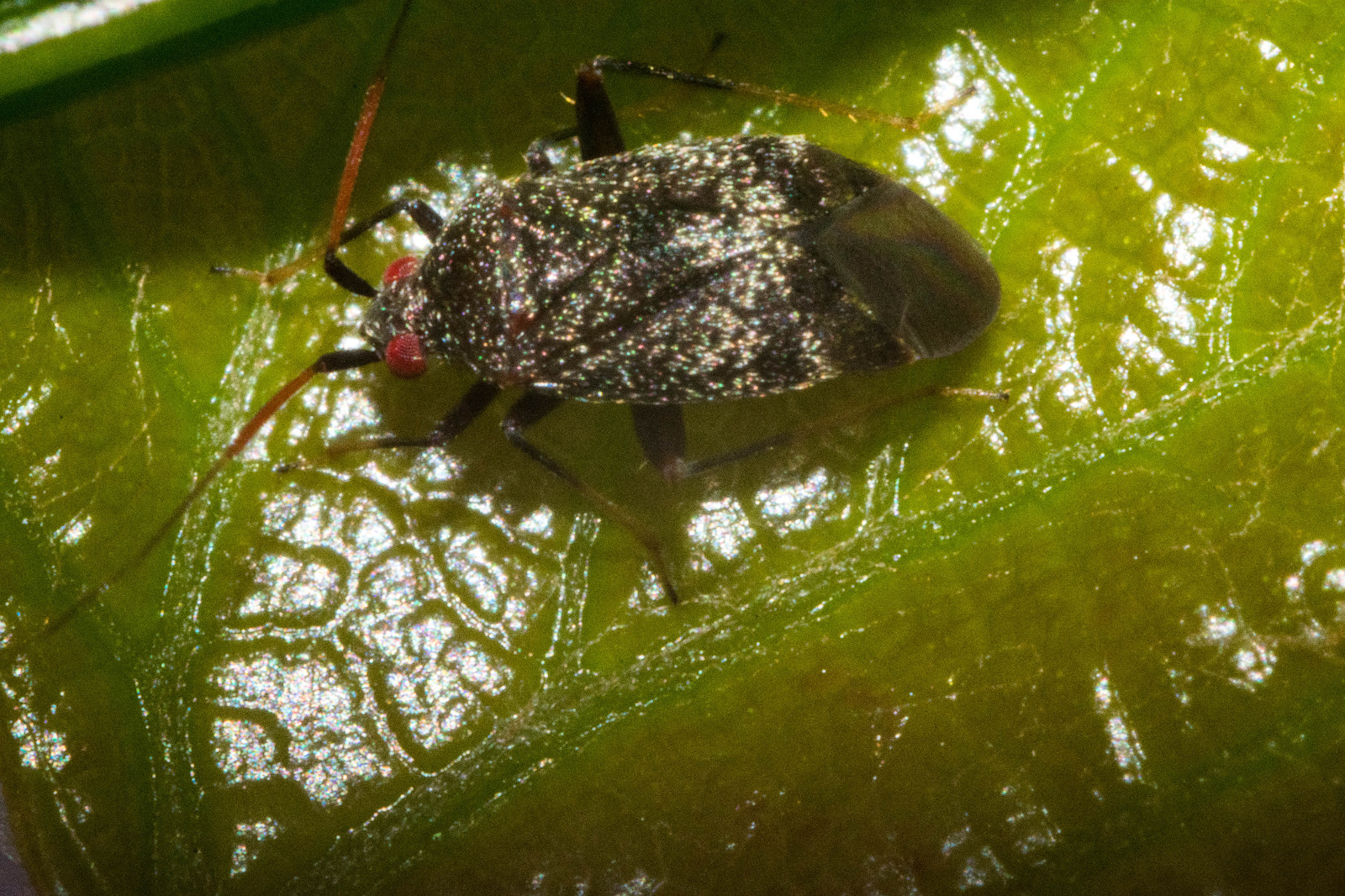
Found on a leaf in Ohio, USA

Atractotomus mali is a species of plant bug in the family Miridae. It is found in Europe and Northern Asia (excluding China) and North America.

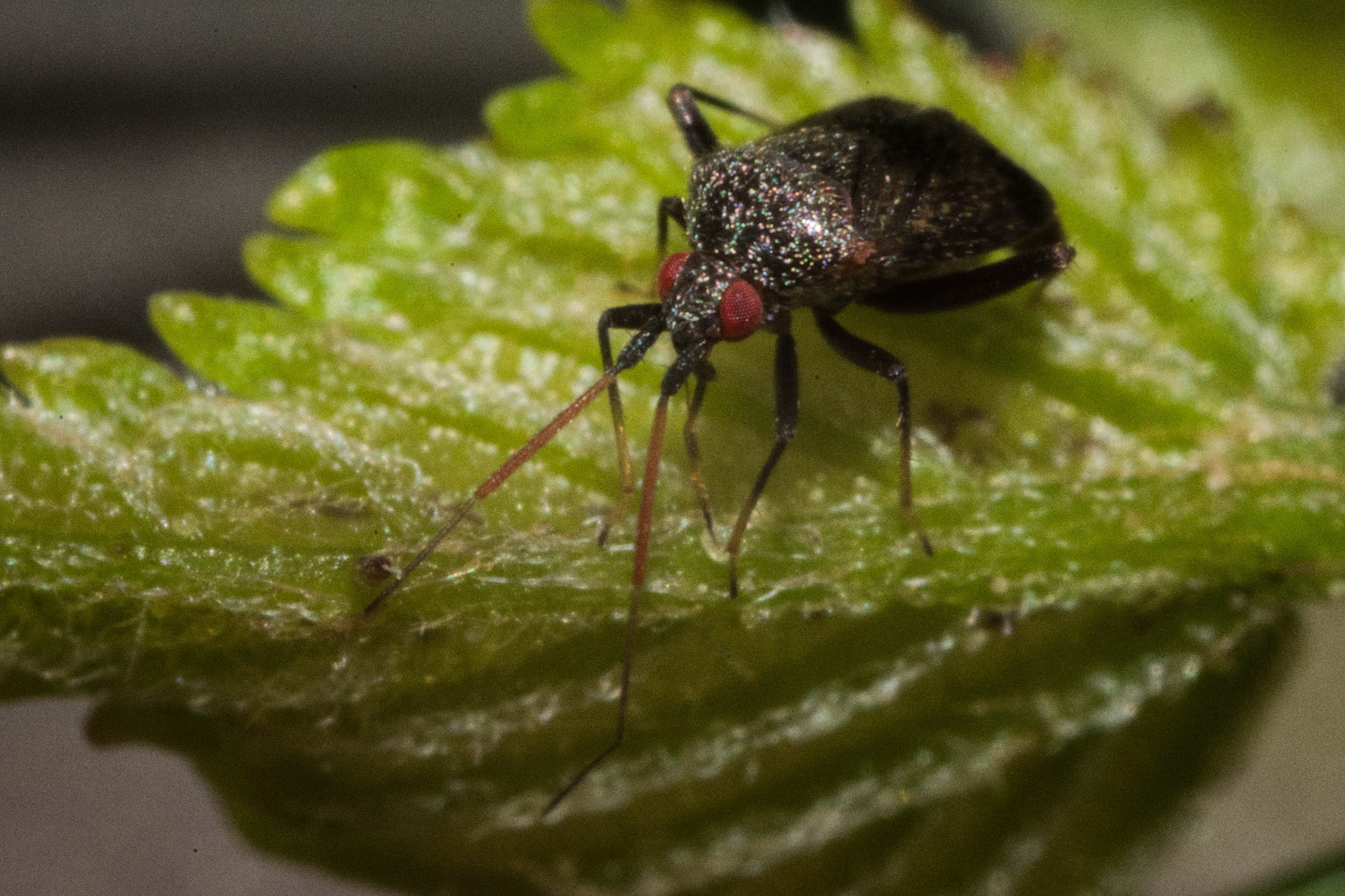
Drinking dew off of a leaf

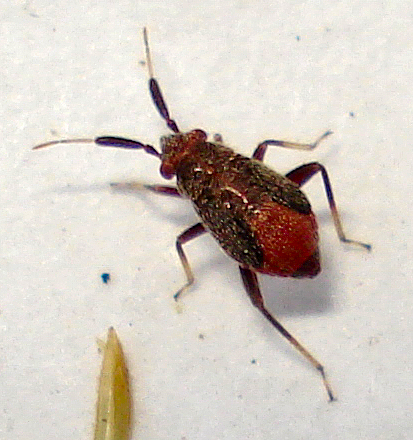
