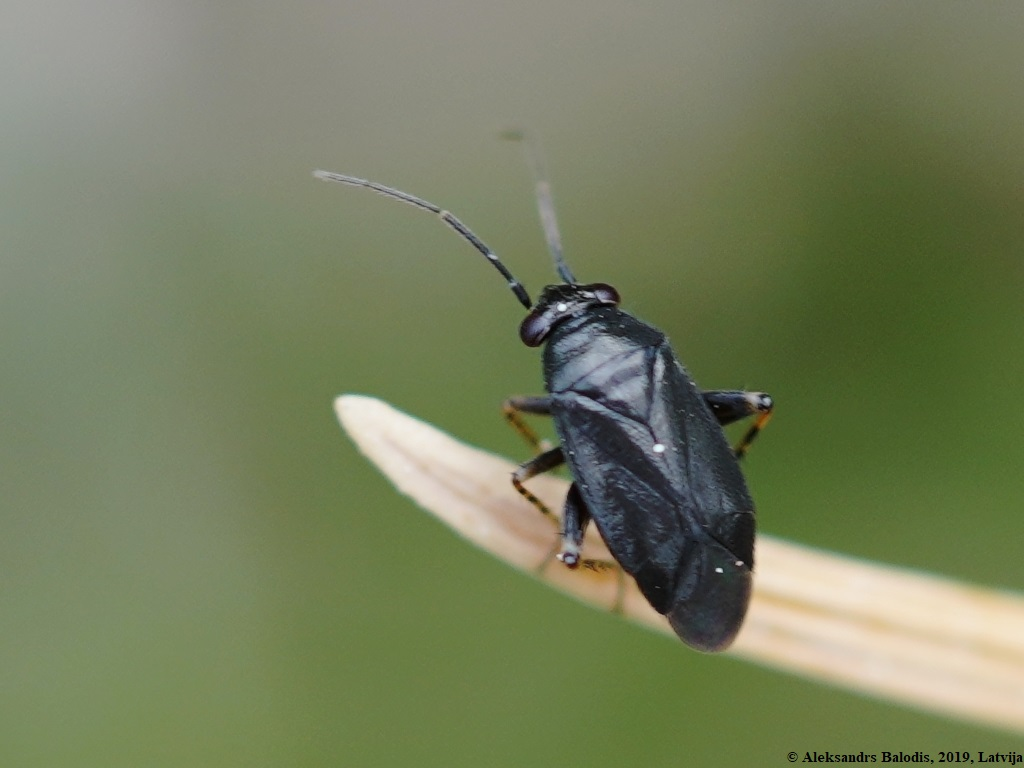
- Chlamydatus pullus, Latvia

Scientific classification
- Kingdom: Animalia
- Phylum: Arthropoda
- Class: Insecta
- Order: Hemiptera
- Suborder: Heteroptera
- Family: Miridae
- Genus: Chlamydatus
- Species: C. pullus

Binomial name
- Chlamydatus pullus (Reuter, 1870)

= Chlamydatus pullus =

Species of true bug

Chlamydatus pullus is a Palearctic species of true bug.
