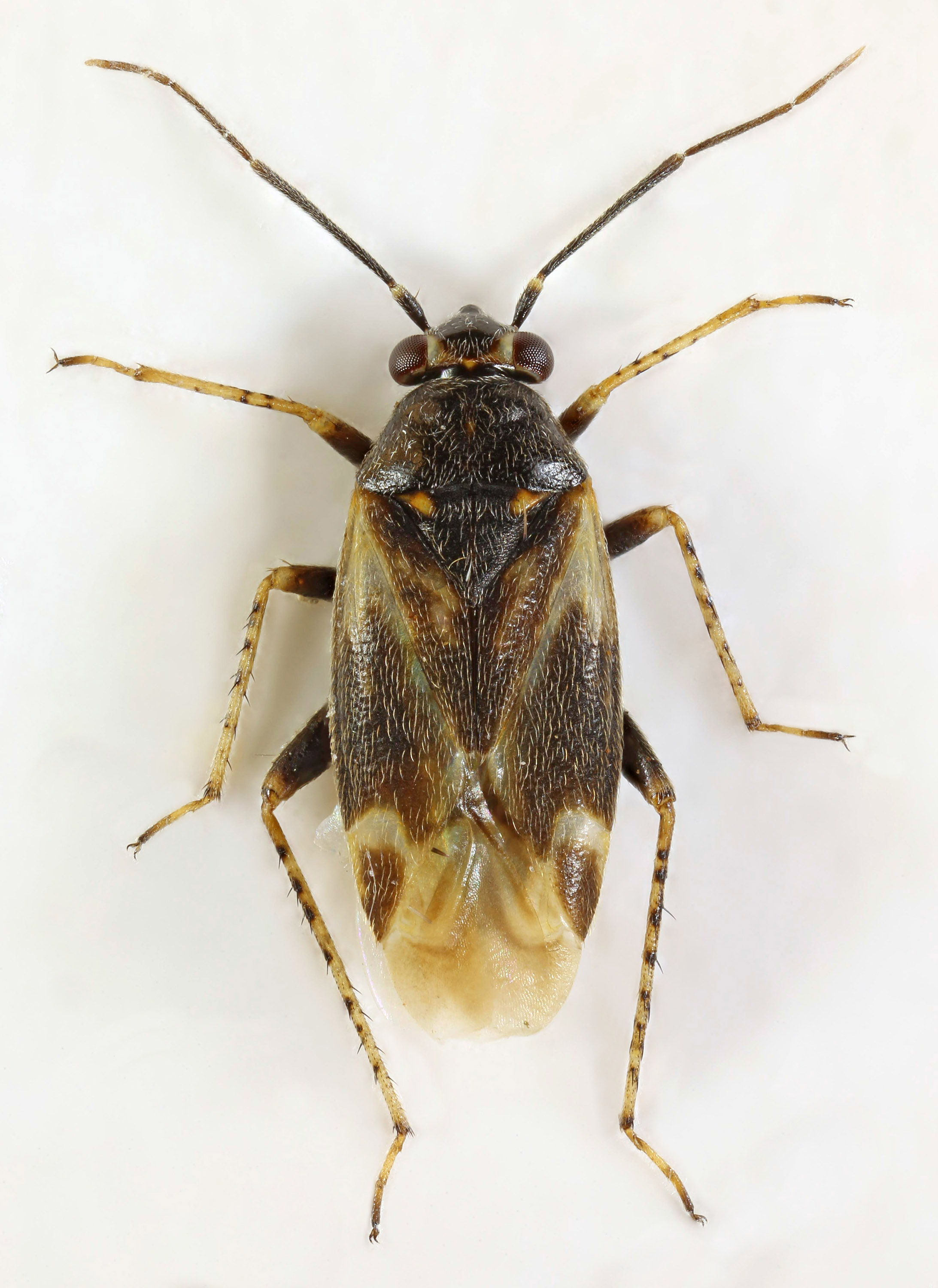
- Monosynamma sabulicola, North Wales

Scientific classification
- Domain: Eukaryota
- Kingdom: Animalia
- Phylum: Arthropoda
- Class: Insecta
- Order: Hemiptera
- Suborder: Heteroptera
- Family: Miridae
- Tribe: Nasocorini
- Genus: Monosynamma; Scott, 1864

= Monosynamma =

Genus of true bugs

Monosynamma is a genus of true bugs belonging to the family Miridae.

The species of this genus are found in Europe and Northern America.

== Species ==
1. Monosynamma bohemanni (Fallen, 1829)
2. Monosynamma maritima (Wagner, 1947)
3. Monosynamma sabulicola (Wagner, 1947)
