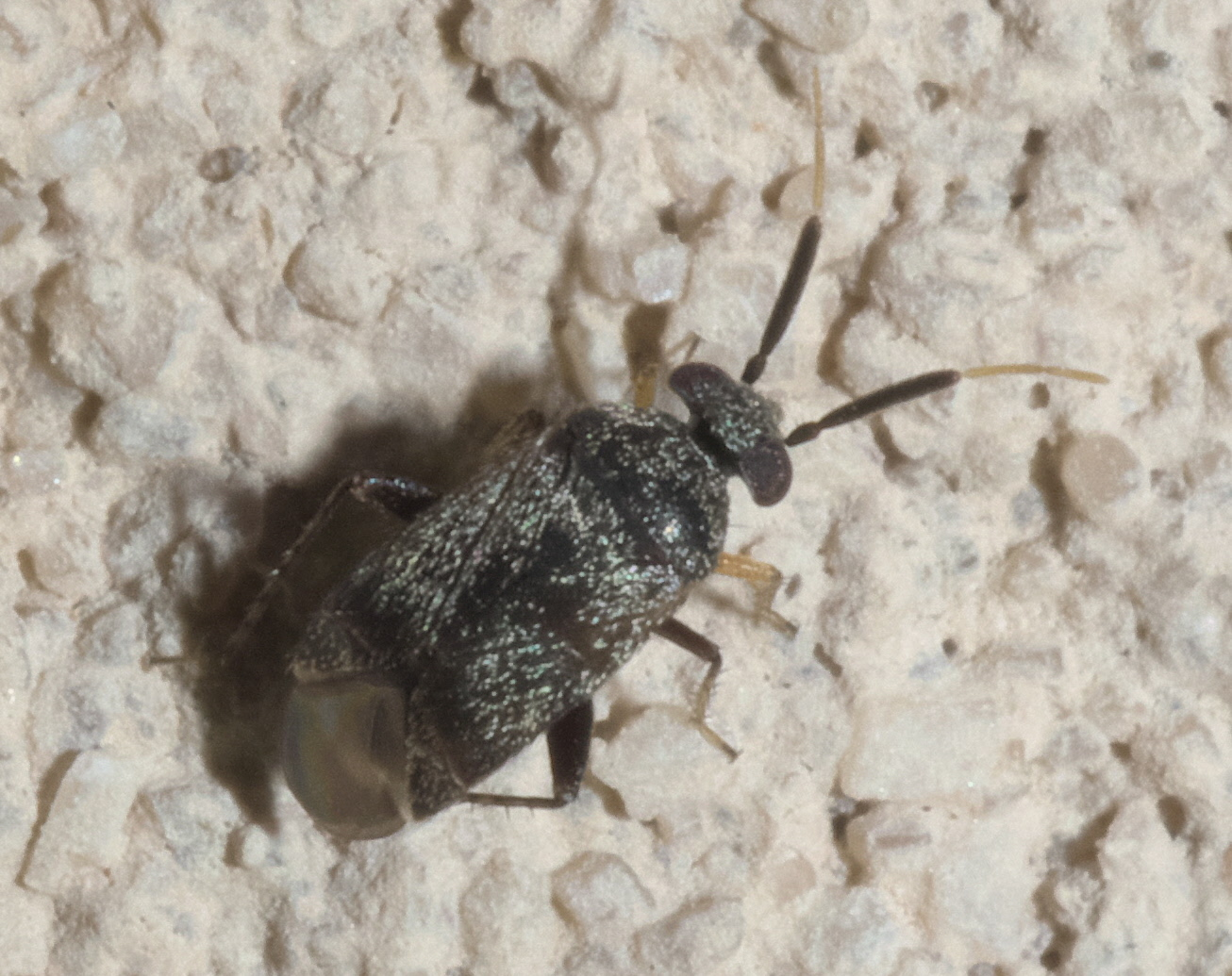
- Rhinacloa forticornis

Scientific classification
- Kingdom: Animalia
- Phylum: Arthropoda
- Clade: Pancrustacea
- Class: Insecta
- Order: Hemiptera
- Suborder: Heteroptera
- Family: Miridae
- Subfamily: Phylinae
- Tribe: Nasocorini
- Genus: Rhinacloa; Reuter, 1876

= Rhinacloa =

Genus of true bugs

Rhinacloa is a genus of plant bugs in the family Miridae. There are more than 30 described species in Rhinacloa.

== Species ==
These 39 species belong to the genus Rhinacloa:

- Rhinacloa antennalis (Reuter, 1905)
- Rhinacloa apicalis (Reuter, 1905)
- Rhinacloa aricana Carvalho, 1948
- Rhinacloa azapa Schuh & Schwartz, 1985
- Rhinacloa basalis (Reuter, 1907)
- Rhinacloa bellissima Carvalho & Gomes, 1970
- Rhinacloa betanzos Schuh & Schwartz, 1985
- Rhinacloa cajamarca Schuh & Schwartz, 1985
- Rhinacloa callicrates Herring, 1971
- Rhinacloa cardini (Barber & Bruner, 1946)
- Rhinacloa carvalhoi Schuh & Schwartz, 1985
- Rhinacloa chapini Schuh & Schwartz, 1985
- Rhinacloa clara (Carvalho, 1991)
- Rhinacloa clavicornis (Reuter, 1905)
- Rhinacloa crassitoma Carvalho, 1984
- Rhinacloa dimorphica Carvalho & Carpintero, 1990
- Rhinacloa fernandoana Schuh & Schwartz, 1985
- Rhinacloa forticornis Reuter, 1876 (western plant bug)
- Rhinacloa incaicus (Carvalho & Gomes, 1968)
- Rhinacloa insularis (Barber, 1925)
- Rhinacloa jujuyensis Carvalho & Carpintero, 1990
- Rhinacloa juli Schuh & Schwartz, 1985
- Rhinacloa longirostris (Carvalho, 1968)
- Rhinacloa luridipennis (Reuter, 1908)
- Rhinacloa maiuscula Carvalho, 1948
- Rhinacloa manleyi Schuh & Schwartz, 1985
- Rhinacloa mella (Van Duzee, 1937)
- Rhinacloa mesoamericana Schuh & Schwartz, 1985
- Rhinacloa mysteriosus Schuh & Schwartz, 1985
- Rhinacloa nigripes Maldonado, 1969
- Rhinacloa pallidipennis Schuh & Schwartz, 1985
- Rhinacloa pallidipes Maldonado, 1969
- Rhinacloa penai Schuh & Schwartz, 1985
- Rhinacloa peruana Schuh & Schwartz, 1985
- Rhinacloa puertoricensis Schuh & Schwartz, 1985
- Rhinacloa rubescens Carvalho, 1968
- Rhinacloa rubroornata Schuh & Schwartz, 1985
- Rhinacloa schaffneri Schuh & Schwartz, 1985
- Rhinacloa usingeri (Carvalho, 1968)
