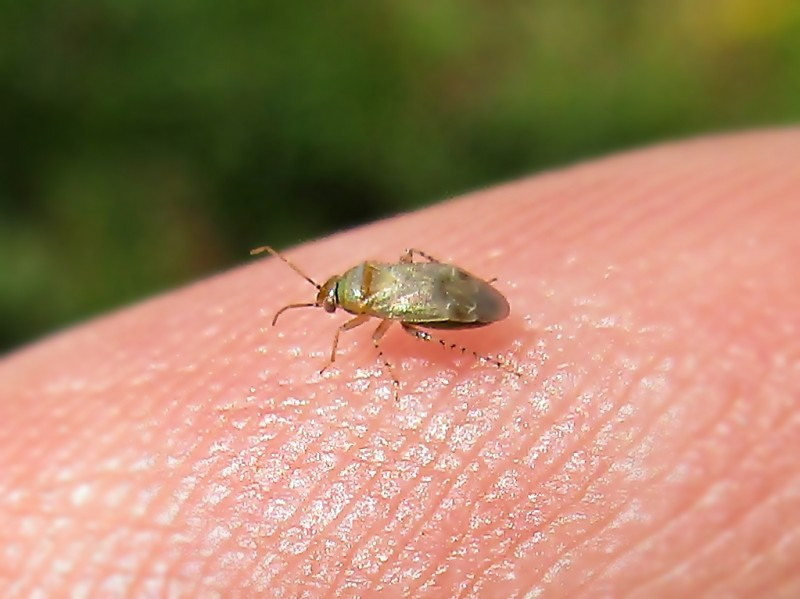

Scientific classification
- Kingdom: Animalia
- Phylum: Arthropoda
- Class: Insecta
- Order: Hemiptera
- Suborder: Heteroptera
- Family: Miridae
- Genus: Campylomma
- Species: C. verbasci

Binomial name
- Campylomma verbasci (Meyer-Dür, 1843)

= Campylomma verbasci =

Species of true bug

Campylomma verbasci, the mullein bug, is a species of plant bug in the family Miridae. It is found in Europe and Northern Asia (excluding China) and North America.
