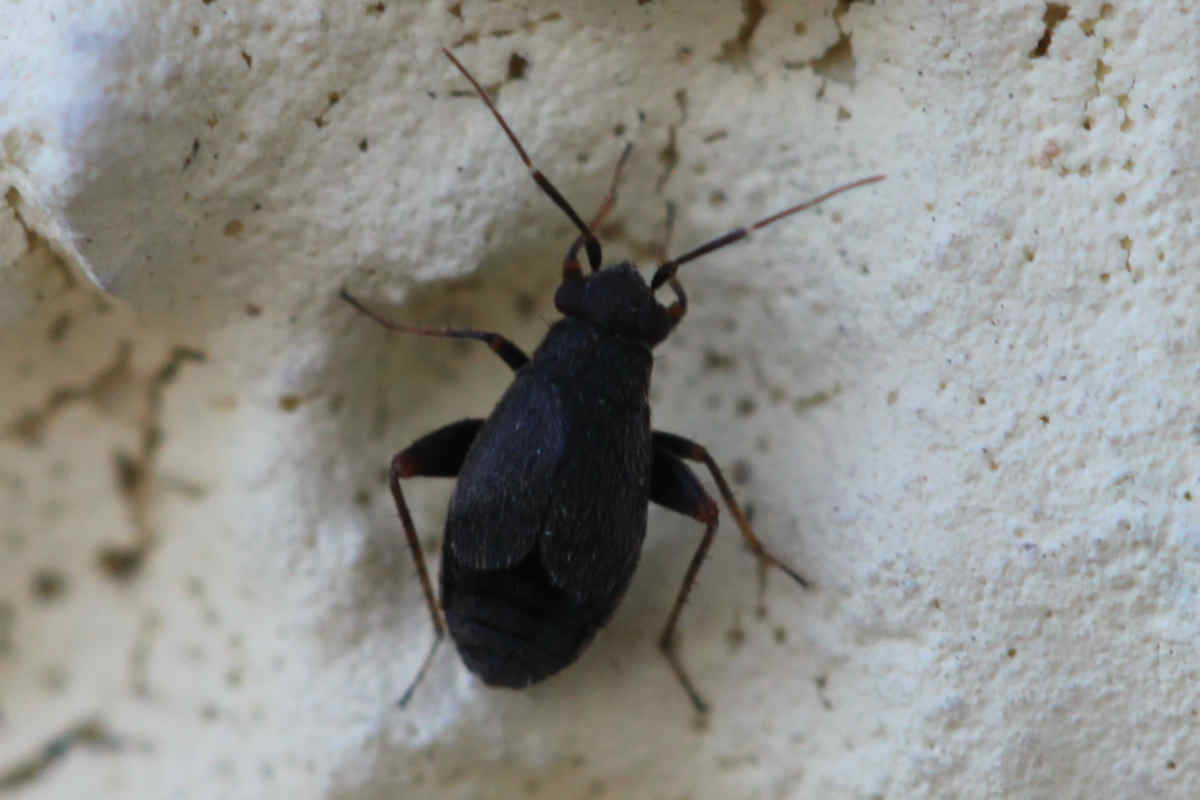
- Chlamydatus evanescens

Scientific classification
- Kingdom: Animalia
- Phylum: Arthropoda
- Clade: Pancrustacea
- Class: Insecta
- Order: Hemiptera
- Suborder: Heteroptera
- Family: Miridae
- Subfamily: Phylinae
- Tribe: Nasocorini
- Genus: Chlamydatus; Curtis, 1833

Synonyms
- Agalliastes Fieber, 1858

= Chlamydatus =

Genus of true bugs

Chlamydatus is a genus of plant bugs in the family Miridae. There are more than 30 described species in Chlamydatus.

== Species ==
These 32 species belong to the genus Chlamydatus:

- Chlamydatus acanthioides (J.Sahlberg, 1875)
- Chlamydatus allii V.Putshkov, 1959
- Chlamydatus artemisiae Kelton, 1965
- Chlamydatus associatus (Uhler, 1872) (ragweed plant bug)
- Chlamydatus becki Knight, 1968
- Chlamydatus brevicornis Knight, 1964
- Chlamydatus californicus Schuh & Schwartz, 2005
- Chlamydatus drymophilus Vinokurov, 1982
- Chlamydatus eurotiae Kerzhner, 1962
- Chlamydatus evanescens (Boheman, 1852)
- Chlamydatus keltoni Schuh & Schwartz, 2005
- Chlamydatus laminatus Li & Liu, 2006
- Chlamydatus longirostris Reuter, 1905
- Chlamydatus monilipes Van Duzee, 1921
- Chlamydatus montanus Knight, 1964
- Chlamydatus nigripes Muminov, 1961
- Chlamydatus obliquus (Uhler, 1893)
- Chlamydatus opacus (Zetterstedt, 1838)
- Chlamydatus pachycerus Kiritshenko, 1931
- Chlamydatus pallidicornis Knight, 1964
- Chlamydatus pallidipes (Reuter, 1906)
- Chlamydatus penthesileia Linnavuori, 1989
- Chlamydatus pulicarius (Fallén, 1807)
- Chlamydatus pullus (Reuter, 1871)
- Chlamydatus ruficornis Knight, 1959
- Chlamydatus saltitans (Fabricius, 1803)
- Chlamydatus sarafrazii Linnavuori, 1998
- Chlamydatus schuhi Knight, 1964
- Chlamydatus sichuanensis Li & Liu, 2006
- Chlamydatus suavis (Reuter, 1876)
- Chlamydatus uniformis (Uhler, 1893)
- Chlamydatus wilkinsoni (Douglas & Scott, 1866)
