= Chlamydatus pulicarius =

Scientific classification
- Kingdom: Animalia
- Phylum: Arthropoda
- Class: Insecta
- Order: Hemiptera
- Suborder: Heteroptera
- Family: Miridae
- Genus: Chlamydatus
- Species: C. pulicarius

Binomial name
- Chlamydatus pulicarius (Fallén, 1807)

Synonyms
- Chlamydatus arcuatus Knight, 1964; Chlamydatus auratus Kelton, 1965

Species of true bug

Chlamydatus pulicarius is a species of plant bug in the family Miridae. It is found in Europe and Northern Asia (excluding China) and North America.
