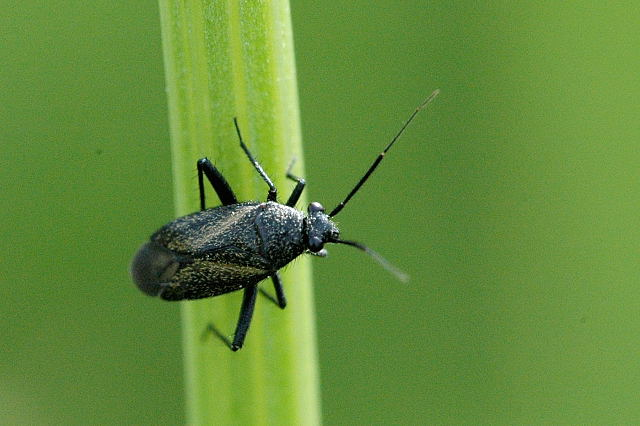
- Atractotomus magnicornis

Scientific classification
- Kingdom: Animalia
- Phylum: Arthropoda
- Clade: Pancrustacea
- Class: Insecta
- Order: Hemiptera
- Suborder: Heteroptera
- Family: Miridae
- Tribe: Nasocorini
- Genus: Atractotomus; Fieber, 1858

= Atractotomus =

Genus of true bugs

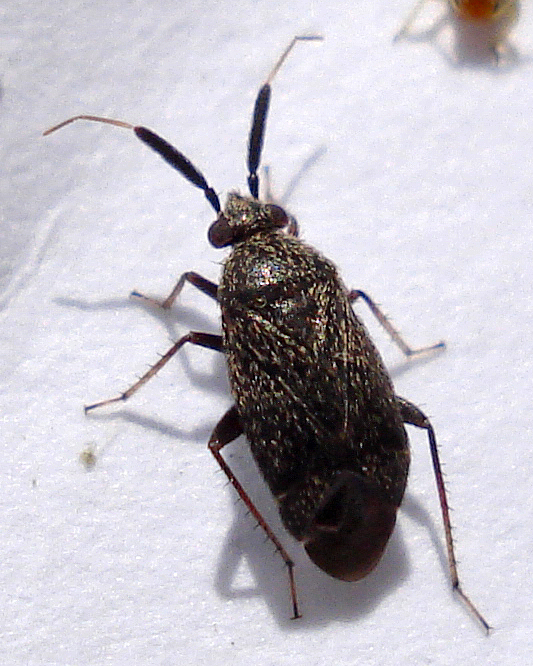
Atractotomus mali

Atractotomus is a genus of predatory hemipterans in the family Miridae. They are found throughout Europe. The larvae and adults primarily eat acarines, psyllids, aphids, and thrips found on fruit trees, vines, and other crops.

== Species ==
These 48 species belong to the genus Atractotomus:

- Atractotomus acaciae Knight, 1925^{i c g b}
- Atractotomus agrifoliae Stonedahl, 1990^{i c g}
- Atractotomus albidicoxis Reuter, 1909^{i c g}
- Atractotomus amygdali Wagner, 1960^{c}
- Atractotomus arizonae (Knight, 1968)^{i c g}
- Atractotomus atricolor (Knight, 1923)^{i c g}
- Atractotomus balli Knight, 1931^{i c b}
- Atractotomus bicolor Stonedahl and Schwartz, 1994^{c g}
- Atractotomus brunomassai Carapezza, 1982^{c g}
- Atractotomus cercocarpi Knight, 1931^{i c g}
- Atractotomus chiapas Stonedahl, 1990^{i c g}
- Atractotomus cooperi Stonedahl, 1990^{i c g b}
- Atractotomus femoralis Fieber, 1858^{c g}
- Atractotomus griseolus (Reuter, 1909)^{i c g}
- Atractotomus iturbide Stonedahl, 1990^{i c g}
- Atractotomus jalisco Stonedahl, 1990^{i c g}
- Atractotomus kija Linnavuori, 1993^{c g}
- Atractotomus kolenatii (Flor, 1860)^{i c g}
- Atractotomus magnicornis (Fallén, 1807)^{i c g b}
- Atractotomus mali (Meyer-Dür, 1843)^{i c g b}
- Atractotomus marcoi Carapezza, 1982^{i c g}
- Atractotomus miniatus (Knight, 1926)^{i c g b}
- Atractotomus mitla Stonedahl, 1990^{i c g}
- Atractotomus morelos Stonedahl, 1990^{c g}
- Atractotomus morelus Stonedahl, 1990^{i g}
- Atractotomus morio Sahlberg, 1883^{i c g}
- Atractotomus nicholi (Knight, 1968)^{i c g b}
- Atractotomus nigripennis (Schuh and Schwartz, 1985)^{i c g}
- Atractotomus oaxaca Stonedahl, 1990^{i c g}
- Atractotomus ovatus (Knight, 1926)^{i c g}
- Atractotomus pallidus Stonedahl, 1990^{i c g}
- Atractotomus parvulus Reuter, 1878^{i c g}
- Atractotomus persquamosus Seidenstücker, 1961^{i c g}
- Atractotomus polymorphae Stonedahl, 1990^{i c g}
- Atractotomus prosopidis (Knight, 1968)^{i c g}
- Atractotomus purshiae Froeschner, 1963^{i}
- Atractotomus quercicola Stonedahl, 1990^{i c g}
- Atractotomus quercinus Stonedahl, 1990^{i c g}
- Atractotomus ramentum Stonedahl, 1990^{i c g}
- Atractotomus reuteri Knight, 1931^{i c g}
- Atractotomus rhodani Fieber, 1861^{c g}
- Atractotomus rubidus (Uhler, 1895)^{i c g b}
- Atractotomus russatus Stonedahl, 1990^{i c g}
- Atractotomus schaffneri Stonedahl, 1990^{i c g}
- Atractotomus schwartzi Stonedahl, 1990^{i c g}
- Atractotomus taxcoensis Stonedahl, 1990^{i c g}
- Atractotomus teopisca Stonedahl and Schwartz, 1994^{c g}
- Atractotomus tuthilli (Knight, 1968)^{i c g}

Data sources: i = ITIS, c = Catalogue of Life, g = GBIF, b = Bugguide.net
