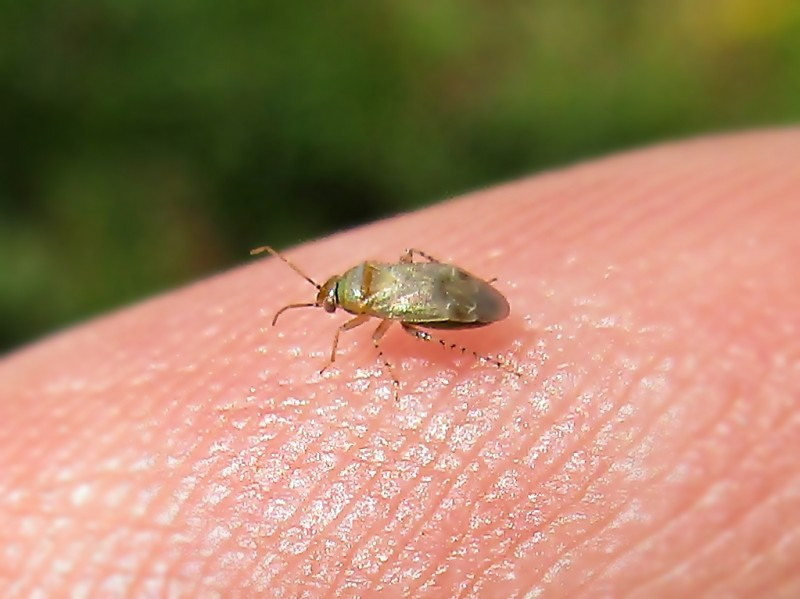
- Campylomma verbasci

Scientific classification
- Kingdom: Animalia
- Phylum: Arthropoda
- Class: Insecta
- Order: Hemiptera
- Suborder: Heteroptera
- Family: Miridae
- Tribe: Nasocorini
- Genus: Campylomma; Reuter, 1878

= Campylomma =

Genus of true bugs

Campylomma is a genus of bugs in the family Miridae and tribe Nasocorini.

== Species ==
The following are included in BioLib.cz:

1. Campylomma acaciae Linnavuori, 1961
2. Campylomma adamsoni Knight, 1938
3. Campylomma admittens Linnavuori, 1975
4. Campylomma angustulum Reuter, 1904
5. Campylomma annulicorne (Signoret, 1865)
6. Campylomma atripes Linnavuori, 1986
7. Campylomma austrina Malipatil, 1992
8. Campylomma boharti Carvalho, 1956
9. Campylomma boninense Carvalho, 1956
10. Campylomma breviata Knight, 1938
11. Campylomma buddlejae Duwal, Yasunaga & Lee, 2010
12. Campylomma cardini Barber & Bruner, 1946
13. Campylomma celatum Wagner, 1969
14. Campylomma chichijima Carvalho, 1956
15. Campylomma chinense Schuh, 1984
16. Campylomma chitwanense Duwal, Yasunaga & Lee, 2010
17. Campylomma citrinella Odhiambo, 1960
18. Campylomma citrinum Carvalho, 1968
19. Campylomma cuneolata Knight, 1938
20. Campylomma diversicorne Reuter, 1878
21. Campylomma eurycephalum Yasunaga, 2001
22. Campylomma fallaciosa Linnavuori & Al-Safadi, 1993
23. Campylomma fopingensis X.M. Li & G.Q. Liu, 2010
24. Campylomma fusca Knight, 1938
25. Campylomma fusciantennata Malipatil, 1992
26. Campylomma fuscicorne Reuter, 1899
27. Campylomma grandis Linnavuori, 1986
28. Campylomma hawaiiensis Usinger, 1942
29. Campylomma hestia Linnavuori & Van Harten, 2001
30. Campylomma hilaris Linnavuori, 1975
31. Campylomma hivaoae Knight, 1938
32. Campylomma incerta Villiers, 1956
33. Campylomma irianica Schuh, 1984
34. Campylomma kalliope Linnavuori, 1989
35. Campylomma khuzestanicum Linnavuori, 2010
36. Campylomma koraticola Yasunaga & Duwal, 2015
37. Campylomma kununurraensis Malipatil, 1992
38. Campylomma leptadeniae Linnavuori, 1975
39. Campylomma leucochilum Reuter, 1905
40. Campylomma liebknechti Girault, 1934 (apple dimpling bug)
41. Campylomma lindbergi Hoberlandt, 1953
42. Campylomma livida Reuter, 1885
43. Campylomma lividicornis Reuter, 1912
44. Campylomma lividum Reuter, 1885
45. Campylomma longirostris Knight, 1938
46. Campylomma luteola Knight, 1938
47. Campylomma luzonica Schuh, 1984
48. Campylomma marjorae Schuh, 1984
49. Campylomma marmorosa Schuh, 1984
50. Campylomma marquesana Knight, 1938
51. Campylomma minima Wagner, 1960
52. Campylomma minuenda Knight, 1938
53. Campylomma minutum (Linnavuori, 1975)
54. Campylomma miyamotoi Yasunaga, 2001
55. Campylomma monticola Poppius, 1914
56. Campylomma nanna Yasunaga & Duwal, 2015
57. Campylomma nigra Schuh, 1984
58. Campylomma nigrifemur Wagner, 1975
59. Campylomma nigronasutum Reuter, 1878
60. Campylomma novocaledonica Schuh, 1984
61. Campylomma novoirlandense Schuh, 1984
62. Campylomma odhiamboi Kerzhner & Schuh, 1995
63. Campylomma oertzenii Reuter, 1888
64. Campylomma oreophila Linnavuori & Al-Safadi, 1993
65. Campylomma papuana Schuh, 1984
66. Campylomma pimai Yasunaga & Duwal, 2015
67. Campylomma plantarum Lindberg, 1959
68. Campylomma pulicariae Linnavuori, 1986
69. Campylomma ribesi Goula, 1986
70. Campylomma rivulorum Linnavuori & Al-Safadi, 1993
71. Campylomma rubrotincta Knight, 1938
72. Campylomma salaciella Yasunaga & Duwal, 2015
73. Campylomma sandaracine Schuh, 1984
74. Campylomma seminigricaput (Girault, 1934)
75. Campylomma simillimum Jakovlev, 1882
76. Campylomma tinctipennis Knight, 1938
77. Campylomma unicolor Poppius, 1914
78. Campylomma vendicarinum Carapezza, 1991
79. Campylomma verbasci (Meyer-Dür, 1843) (mullein bug)
80. Campylomma viridissima Linnavuori & Al-Safadi, 1993
81. Campylomma viticis Lindberg, 1948
