= Maurodactylus =

Scientific classification
- Kingdom: Animalia
- Phylum: Arthropoda
- Class: Insecta
- Order: Hemiptera
- Suborder: Heteroptera
- Family: Miridae
- Tribe: Phylini
- Genus: Maurodactylus; Reuter, 1878

Species
- Maurodactylus acanthophylli V. Putshkov, 1980; Maurodactylus albidus Kolenati, 1845; Maurodactylus alutaceus Fieber, 1870; Maurodactylus fulvus Reuter, 1904; Maurodactylus kukuensis V. Putshkov, 1978; Maurodactylus nigrigenis Reuter, 1890

Synonyms
- Campylognathus Reuter, 1890

Genus of true bugs

Maurodactylus is a genus of plant bug of the tribe Phylini.
