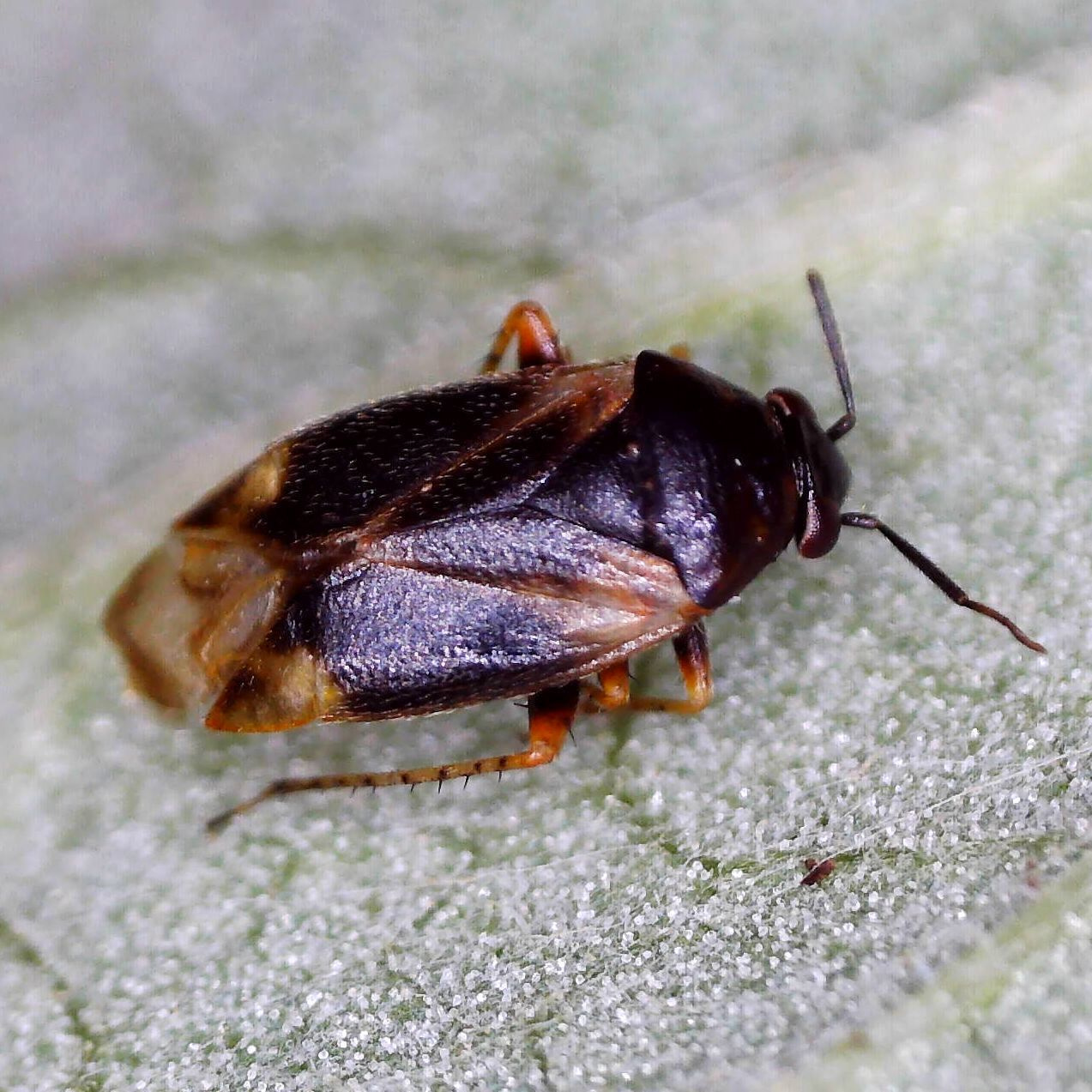
- Salicarus roseri, United Kingdom

Scientific classification
- Kingdom: Animalia
- Phylum: Arthropoda
- Class: Insecta
- Order: Hemiptera
- Suborder: Heteroptera
- Family: Miridae
- Subfamily: Phylinae
- Tribe: Nasocorini; Reuter, 1883

= Nasocorini =

Tribe of insects

Nasocorini is a tribe of plant bugs in the family Miridae. There are more than 50 genera in Nasocorini.

== Genera ==
These 59 genera belong to the tribe Nasocorini:

- Adenostomocoris Schuh & Schwartz, 2004 - Southwest Nearctic
- Agrametra Buchanan-White, 1878 - St. Helena Island
- Arctostaphylocoris Schuh & Schwartz, 2004 - Western Nearctic
- Atomophora Reuter, 1879 - Palearctic
- Atomoscelis Reuter, 1875 - Palearctic
- Atractotomoidea Yasunaga, 1999 - southern and eastern Asia
- Atractotomus Fieber, 1858 - Holarctic
- Badezorus Distant, 1910 - Palearctic
- Beckocoris Knight, 1968 - Western Nearctic
- Bergmiris Carvalho, 1984 - Neotropics
- Boopidocoris Reuter, 1879 - Palearctic
- Caiganga Carvalho & Becker, 1957 - Neotropics
- Camptotylidea Wagner, 1957 - Palearctic
- Campylomma Reuter, 1878 - Old World, Australia
- Chinacapsus Wagner, 1961 - Palearctic
- Chlamydatus Curtis, 1833 - Holarctic
- Chlamyopsallus Schwartz, 2005 - Western Nearctic
- Hambletoniola Carvalho, 1954 - Western Nearctic
- Helenocoris Schmitz, 1976 - St. Helena Island
- Hirtopsallus Schmitz, 1976 - St. Helena Island
- Insulopus Schmitz, 1976 - St. Helena Island
- Karocris V. Putshkov, 1975 - Palearctic
- Kasumiphylus Schwartz & Stonedahl, 2004 - Palearctic
- Knightomiroides Stonedahl & Schwartz, 1996 - Western Nearctic
- Lamprosthenarus Poppius, 1914 - Africa
- Larinocerus Froeschner, 1965 - Western Nearctic
- Lattinophylus Schuh, 2008 - Western Nearctic
- Lindbergopsallus Wagner, 1962 - Palearctic
- Lopsallus Schmitz, 1976 - St. Helena Island
- Maurodactylus Reuter, 1878 - Palearctic
- Megalopsallus Knight, 1927 - Nearctic
- Monosynamma J. Scott, 1864 - Holarctic
- Naresthus Schmitz, 1976 - St. Helena Island
- Nasocoris Reuter, 1879 - Palearctic
- Neisopsallus Schmitz, 1976 - St. Helena Island
- Neophylus Carvalho & Costa, 1992 - Nearctic
- Nevadocoris Knight, 1968 - Western Nearctic
- Nigrimiris Carvalho & Schaffner, 1973 - Neotropics
- Nigrocapillocoris Wagner, 1973 - Palearctic
- Oligobiella Reuter, 1885 - St. Helena Island
- Orthopidea Reuter, 1899 - Palearctic
- Phaxia Kerzhner, 1984 - Palearctic
- Phoenicocoris Reuter, 1875 - Holarctic
- Pinomiris Stonedahl & Schwartz, 1996 - Western Nearctic
- Pruneocoris Schuh & Schwartz, 2004 - Western Nearctic
- Psallomimus Wagner, 1951 - Africa, southern Palearctic
- Rhinacloa Reuter, 1876 - Neotropics, Mexico
- Salicarus Kerzhner, 1962 - Palearctic
- Solenoxyphus Reuter, 1875 - Palearctic
- Spanagonicus Berg, 1883 - New World
- Squamophylus Carvalho & Costa, 1992 - Nearctic
- Sthenaropsis Poppius, 1912 - Palearctic
- Taeniophorus Linnavuori, 1952 - Palearctic
- Tannerocoris Knight, 1970 - Western Nearctic
- Tapuruyunus Carvalho, 1946 - Neotropics
- Thymopsallus Linnavuori, 1975 - Palearctic
- Tijucaphylus Carvalho & Costa, 1992 - Neotropics
- Tunisiella Carapezza, 1997 - Palearctic
- Voruchia Reuter, 1879 - Palearctic
