= Coleophora santolinella =

Scientific classification
- Kingdom: Animalia
- Phylum: Arthropoda
- Class: Insecta
- Order: Lepidoptera
- Family: Coleophoridae
- Genus: Coleophora
- Species: C. santolinella

Binomial name
- Coleophora santolinella Constant, 1890

Species of moth

Coleophora santolinella is a moth of the family Coleophoridae. It is found in Spain and on Corsica and Sardinia.
