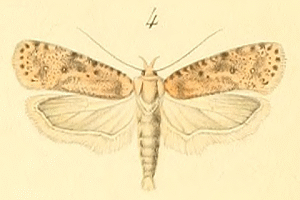

Scientific classification
- Kingdom: Animalia
- Phylum: Arthropoda
- Clade: Pancrustacea
- Class: Insecta
- Order: Lepidoptera
- Family: Depressariidae
- Genus: Agonopterix
- Species: A. chironiella

Binomial name
- Agonopterix chironiella (Constant, 1893)

Synonyms
- Depressaria chironiella Constant, 1893

= Agonopterix chironiella =

Species of moth

Agonopterix chironiella is a moth of the family Depressariidae. It is found in Portugal, Spain, France, Italy and on Sicily.

The wingspan is 24–27 mm.

The larvae feed on Opoponax chironium.
