= Elachista infuscata =

Scientific classification
- Kingdom: Animalia
- Phylum: Arthropoda
- Class: Insecta
- Order: Lepidoptera
- Family: Elachistidae
- Genus: Elachista
- Species: E. infuscata

Binomial name
- Elachista infuscata Frey, 1882

Species of moth

Elachista infuscata is a moth of the family Elachistidae. It is found in Italy, Switzerland and Greece.

== Taxonomy ==
It has been treated as a synonym of Elachista exactella.
