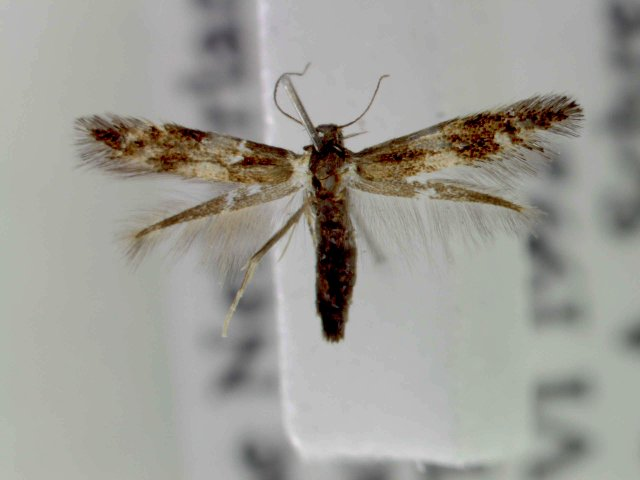

Scientific classification
- Domain: Eukaryota
- Kingdom: Animalia
- Phylum: Arthropoda
- Class: Insecta
- Order: Lepidoptera
- Family: Elachistidae
- Genus: Elachista
- Species: E. fulgens

Binomial name
- Elachista fulgens Parenti, 1983

Synonyms
- Biselachista fulgens

= Elachista fulgens =

Species of moth

Elachista fulgens is a moth of the family Elachistidae. It is found in Italy, Germany, the Netherlands and Japan (Kyûsyû, Ryûkyû; Honsyû).

The length of the forewings is 2.4–2.7 millimetres (0.094–0.106 in) for males and 2.6–3.5 millimetres (0.10–0.14 in) for females.

The larvae feed on Carex acutiformis, Carex elata and Carex riparia. They mine the leaves of their host plant.

== Taxonomy ==
Some authors list Elachista arnoldi as a synonym of Elachista fulgens.
