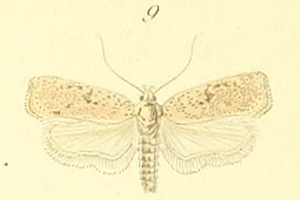

Scientific classification
- Kingdom: Animalia
- Phylum: Arthropoda
- Clade: Pancrustacea
- Class: Insecta
- Order: Lepidoptera
- Family: Depressariidae
- Genus: Agonopterix
- Species: A. aspersella

Binomial name
- Agonopterix aspersella (Constant, 1888)

Synonyms
- Depressaria aspersella Constant, 1888; Depressaria novaspersella Spuler, 1910; Depressaria autocnista Meyrick, 1921

= Agonopterix aspersella =

Species of moth

Agonopterix aspersella is a moth of the family Depressariidae. It is found in France, Spain and Romania and on Corsica and Sicily.

The wingspan is 21–24 mm.
