= Coleophora albicella =

Scientific classification
- Kingdom: Animalia
- Phylum: Arthropoda
- Class: Insecta
- Order: Lepidoptera
- Family: Coleophoridae
- Genus: Coleophora
- Species: C. albicella

Binomial name
- Coleophora albicella Constant, 1885

Synonyms
- Coleophora santolinae Hartig 1938; Coleophora ventifuga Walsingham, 1898

Species of moth

Coleophora albicella is a moth of the family Coleophoridae. It is found in France, Spain, Corsica and Sardinia.

The larvae feed on Artemisia caerulescens gallica and Santolina chamaecyparissus. Larvae can be found from October to June.
