= Coleophora hieronella =

Scientific classification
- Kingdom: Animalia
- Phylum: Arthropoda
- Clade: Pancrustacea
- Class: Insecta
- Order: Lepidoptera
- Family: Coleophoridae
- Genus: Coleophora
- Species: C. hieronella

Binomial name
- Coleophora hieronella Zeller, 1849

Species of moth

Coleophora hieronella is a moth of the family Coleophoridae. It is found in southern Europe and North Africa.

The length of the forewings is 6-6.5 mm for males and 5.5–6 mm for females.

The larvae feed on Trifolium angustifolium.
