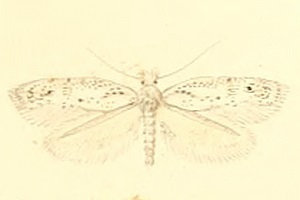

Scientific classification
- Kingdom: Animalia
- Phylum: Arthropoda
- Clade: Pancrustacea
- Class: Insecta
- Order: Lepidoptera
- Family: Bucculatricidae
- Genus: Bucculatrix
- Species: B. helichrysella

Binomial name
- Bucculatrix helichrysella Constant, 1889

= Bucculatrix helichrysella =

Species of moth

Bucculatrix helichrysella is a moth in the family Bucculatricidae. It was described by Alexandre Constant in 1889. It is found in southern Europe, where it has been recorded from France, the Iberian Peninsula, Corsica, Sardinia and North Macedonia.

The wingspan is about 7 mm.

The larvae feed on Helichrysum italicum. They mine the leaves of their host plant. Larvae can be found in April.
