= Coleophora lessinica =

Scientific classification
- Kingdom: Animalia
- Phylum: Arthropoda
- Clade: Pancrustacea
- Class: Insecta
- Order: Lepidoptera
- Family: Coleophoridae
- Genus: Coleophora
- Species: C. lessinica

Binomial name
- Coleophora lessinica Baldizzone, 1980

Species of moth

Coleophora lessinica is a moth of the family Coleophoridae. It is found in France, Italy, Croatia, Hungary and North Macedonia.
