= Coleophora gaviaepennella =

Scientific classification
- Kingdom: Animalia
- Phylum: Arthropoda
- Class: Insecta
- Order: Lepidoptera
- Family: Coleophoridae
- Genus: Coleophora
- Species: C. gaviaepennella

Binomial name
- Coleophora gaviaepennella Toll, 1952

Synonyms
- Ecebalia gaviaepennella

Species of moth

Coleophora gaviaepennella is a moth of the family Coleophoridae. It is found from the southern part of the Western Palaearctic realm to Mongolia.

Adults are on wing in August.

The larvae feed on Atriplex tatarica and Atriplex tornabenii. They feed on the generative organs of their host plant.
