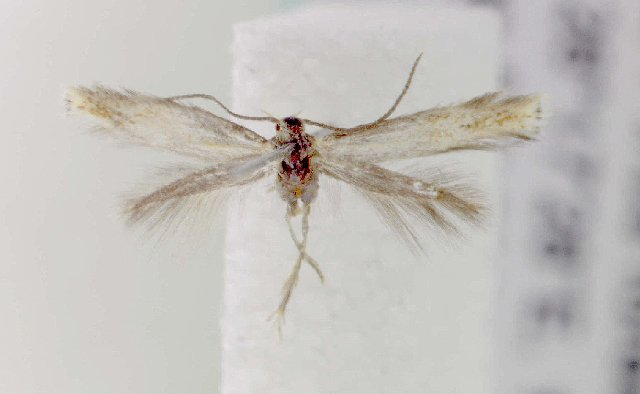

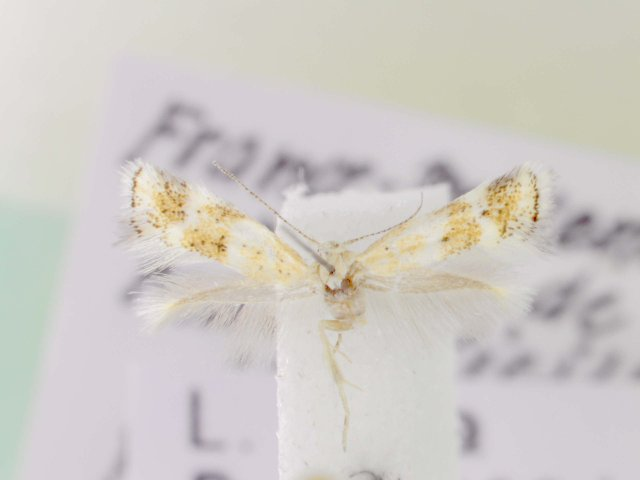

Scientific classification
- Kingdom: Animalia
- Phylum: Arthropoda
- Class: Insecta
- Order: Lepidoptera
- Family: Elachistidae
- Genus: Elachista
- Species: E. agelensis

Binomial name
- Elachista agelensis Traugott-Olsen, 1996

= Elachista agelensis =

Species of moth

Elachista agelensis is a moth of the family Elachistidae. It is found in France, Italy and the Czech Republic.
