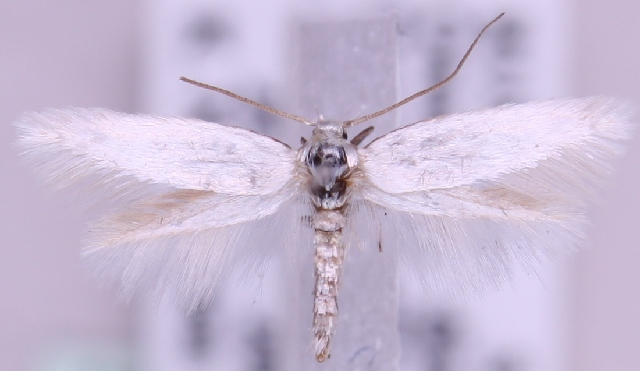

Scientific classification
- Kingdom: Animalia
- Phylum: Arthropoda
- Class: Insecta
- Order: Lepidoptera
- Family: Elachistidae
- Genus: Elachista
- Species: E. galactitella

Binomial name
- Elachista galactitella (Eversmann, 1844)

Synonyms
- Oecophora galactitella Eversmann, 1844; Elachista galacticella; Elachista bustilloi Traugott-Olsen, 1988

= Elachista galactitella =

Species of moth

Elachista galactitella is a moth of the family Elachistidae. It is found in the Alps in Spain, France, Switzerland and Italy as well as Russia.

There is one generation per year.

The larvae feed on Stipa pennata. They mine the leaves of their host plant.
