= Coleophora cinerea =

Scientific classification
- Kingdom: Animalia
- Phylum: Arthropoda
- Class: Insecta
- Order: Lepidoptera
- Family: Coleophoridae
- Genus: Coleophora
- Species: C. cinerea

Binomial name
- Coleophora cinerea Toll, 1953

Species of moth

Coleophora cinerea is a moth of the family Coleophoridae. It is found in France and Italy.
