= Coleophora ravillella =

Scientific classification
- Kingdom: Animalia
- Phylum: Arthropoda
- Class: Insecta
- Order: Lepidoptera
- Family: Coleophoridae
- Genus: Coleophora
- Species: C. ravillella

Binomial name
- Coleophora ravillella Toll, 1961

Species of moth

Coleophora ravillella is a moth of the family Coleophoridae. It is found in France, Spain and Italy.

The larvae feed on Onobrychis saxatilis and Onobrychis viciifolia.
