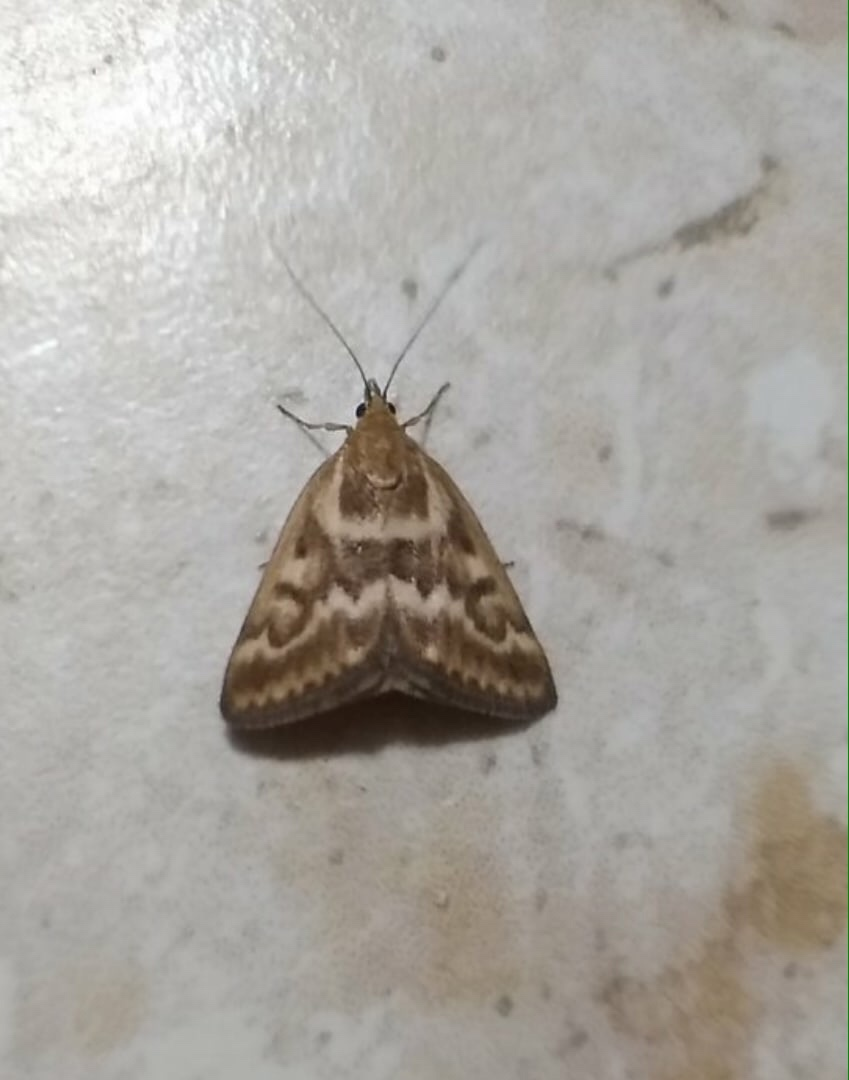

Scientific classification
- Domain: Eukaryota
- Kingdom: Animalia
- Phylum: Arthropoda
- Class: Insecta
- Order: Lepidoptera
- Family: Crambidae
- Genus: Pyrausta
- Species: P. limbopunctalis

Binomial name
- Pyrausta limbopunctalis (Herrich-Schaffer, 1849)

Synonyms
- Botys limbopunctalis Herrich-Schaffer, 1849; Botys dissolutalis Staudinger, 1880; Botys frustalis Herrich-Schäffer, 1861; Herbula congeneralis Guenée, 1854; Herbula sardinialis Guenée, 1854

= Pyrausta limbopunctalis =

Species of moth

Pyrausta limbopunctalis is a species of moth in the family Crambidae. It is found in Portugal, Spain, on Sardinia and in Russia, Turkey and North Africa, including Morocco.

== Subspecies ==
- Pyrausta limbopunctalis limbopunctalis
- Pyrausta limbopunctalis congeneralis (Guenee, 1854)
- Pyrausta limbopunctalis frustalis (Herrich-Schaffer, 1861)
- Pyrausta limbopunctalis sardinialis (Guenee, 1854) (Sardinia)
