= Udea bipunctalis =

Scientific classification
- Domain: Eukaryota
- Kingdom: Animalia
- Phylum: Arthropoda
- Class: Insecta
- Order: Lepidoptera
- Family: Crambidae
- Genus: Udea
- Species: U. bipunctalis

Binomial name
- Udea bipunctalis (Herrich-Schaffer, 1851)

Synonyms
- Botys bipunctalis Herrich-Schaffer, 1851; Scopula dispunctalis Guenée, 1854; Botys silvalis de Joannis, 1891

Species of moth

Udea bipunctalis is a species of moth in the family Crambidae. It is found in France, Portugal and Spain, on Sicily and Crete and in Syria, Turkey and Russia.
