= Coleophora solenella =

Scientific classification
- Kingdom: Animalia
- Phylum: Arthropoda
- Class: Insecta
- Order: Lepidoptera
- Family: Coleophoridae
- Genus: Coleophora
- Species: C. solenella

Binomial name
- Coleophora solenella Staudinger, 1859

Species of moth

Coleophora solenella is a moth of the family Coleophoridae. It is found in France, Switzerland, Spain, Italy and southern Russia.

The larvae feed on Artemisia campestris. Larvae can be found from October to June.
