= Coleophora algeriensis =

Scientific classification
- Kingdom: Animalia
- Phylum: Arthropoda
- Class: Insecta
- Order: Lepidoptera
- Family: Coleophoridae
- Genus: Coleophora
- Species: C. algeriensis

Binomial name
- Coleophora algeriensis Toll, 1952

Species of moth

Coleophora algeriensis is a moth of the family Coleophoridae. It is found in Spain, Portugal, Sicily and North Africa.

The larvae feed on Suaeda species, including Suaeda maritima.
