= Coleophora directella =

Scientific classification
- Kingdom: Animalia
- Phylum: Arthropoda
- Clade: Pancrustacea
- Class: Insecta
- Order: Lepidoptera
- Family: Coleophoridae
- Genus: Coleophora
- Species: C. directella

Binomial name
- Coleophora directella Zeller, 1849

Species of moth

Coleophora directella is a moth of the family Coleophoridae. It is found in most of Europe, except Great Britain, Ireland, the Iberian Peninsula and the Balkan Peninsula. It is also known from China.

The wingspan is about 17 mm.

The larvae feed on Artemisia campestris and Helichrysum species. Larvae can be found from September to June of the following year.
