= Coleophora sisteronica =

Scientific classification
- Kingdom: Animalia
- Phylum: Arthropoda
- Class: Insecta
- Order: Lepidoptera
- Family: Coleophoridae
- Genus: Coleophora
- Species: C. sisteronica

Binomial name
- Coleophora sisteronica Toll, 1961

Species of moth

Coleophora sisteronica is a moth of the family Coleophoridae. It is found in southern France, Spain and Italy.

The larvae feed on Coronilla minima. Larvae can be found from autumn to May. The species is nocturnal.
