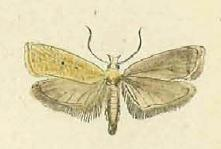

Scientific classification
- Kingdom: Animalia
- Phylum: Arthropoda
- Clade: Pancrustacea
- Class: Insecta
- Order: Lepidoptera
- Family: Depressariidae
- Genus: Agonopterix
- Species: A. squamosa

Binomial name
- Agonopterix squamosa (Mann, 1864)

Synonyms
- Depressaria squamosa Mann, 1864

= Agonopterix squamosa =

Species of moth

Agonopterix squamosa is a moth of the family Depressariidae. It is found in Spain, France, Italy, Croatia, North Macedonia and Turkey and on Sardinia and Sicily. It has also been recorded from Israel.
