= Coleophora chretieni =

Scientific classification
- Kingdom: Animalia
- Phylum: Arthropoda
- Clade: Pancrustacea
- Class: Insecta
- Order: Lepidoptera
- Family: Coleophoridae
- Genus: Coleophora
- Species: C. chretieni

Binomial name
- Coleophora chretieni Baldizzone, 1979

Species of moth

Coleophora chretieni is a moth of the family Coleophoridae. It is found on Sardinia and Corsica.
