= Coleophora maritimarum =

Scientific classification
- Kingdom: Animalia
- Phylum: Arthropoda
- Clade: Pancrustacea
- Class: Insecta
- Order: Lepidoptera
- Family: Coleophoridae
- Genus: Coleophora
- Species: C. maritimarum

Binomial name
- Coleophora maritimarum Baldizzone, 2004

Species of moth

Coleophora maritimarum is a moth of the family Coleophoridae. It is found in the French and Italian Alps.

The larvae probably feed on Aster alpinus.

The scientific name for the taxon was first published in 2004 by Giorgio Baldizzone.
