= Coleophora afrosarda =

Scientific classification
- Kingdom: Animalia
- Phylum: Arthropoda
- Clade: Pancrustacea
- Class: Insecta
- Order: Lepidoptera
- Family: Coleophoridae
- Genus: Coleophora
- Species: C. afrosarda

Binomial name
- Coleophora afrosarda Baldizzone & Kaltenbach, 1983

Species of moth

Coleophora afrosarda is a moth of the family Coleophoridae that can be found in such European countries as Portugal, France, Greece, Spain, and island of Sardinia. It can also be found in Tunisia of North Africa.

The larvae feed on Ecebalia, Salicornia fruticosa and Halimione portulacoides.
