= Coleophora argenteonivea =

Scientific classification
- Kingdom: Animalia
- Phylum: Arthropoda
- Class: Insecta
- Order: Lepidoptera
- Family: Coleophoridae
- Genus: Coleophora
- Species: C. argenteonivea

Binomial name
- Coleophora argenteonivea Walsingham, 1907

Synonyms
- Coleophora nivea Toll, 1952

Species of moth

Coleophora argenteonivea is a moth of the family Coleophoridae. It is found in southern France, Spain, Portugal and Sardinia.

The larvae feed on Centaurea pectinata and Cynara cardunculus. Larvae can be found from August to May.
