= Coleophora spumosella =

Scientific classification
- Kingdom: Animalia
- Phylum: Arthropoda
- Class: Insecta
- Order: Lepidoptera
- Family: Coleophoridae
- Genus: Coleophora
- Species: C. spumosella

Binomial name
- Coleophora spumosella Staudinger, 1859

Species of moth

Coleophora spumosella is a moth of the family Coleophoridae. It has a disjunct distribution and is found in France, Switzerland, Spain, Italy, Croatia and southern Russia.

The larvae feed on Astragalus, Dorycnium pentaphyllum, Medicago and Ononis species. Larvae can be found from autumn to April.
