= Coleophora retrodentella =

Scientific classification
- Kingdom: Animalia
- Phylum: Arthropoda
- Clade: Pancrustacea
- Class: Insecta
- Order: Lepidoptera
- Family: Coleophoridae
- Genus: Coleophora
- Species: C. retrodentella

Binomial name
- Coleophora retrodentella Baldizzone & Nel, 2004

Species of moth

Coleophora retrodentella is a moth of the family Coleophoridae. It is found in the French and Italian Alps, with additional records in other parts of Europe, including Austria, Hungary, Slovakia, Croatia, Estonia, Latvia, Lithuania, and Russia.

The larvae feed on Minuartia rostrata and Minuartia setacea. They create a case of about 5 mm long.
