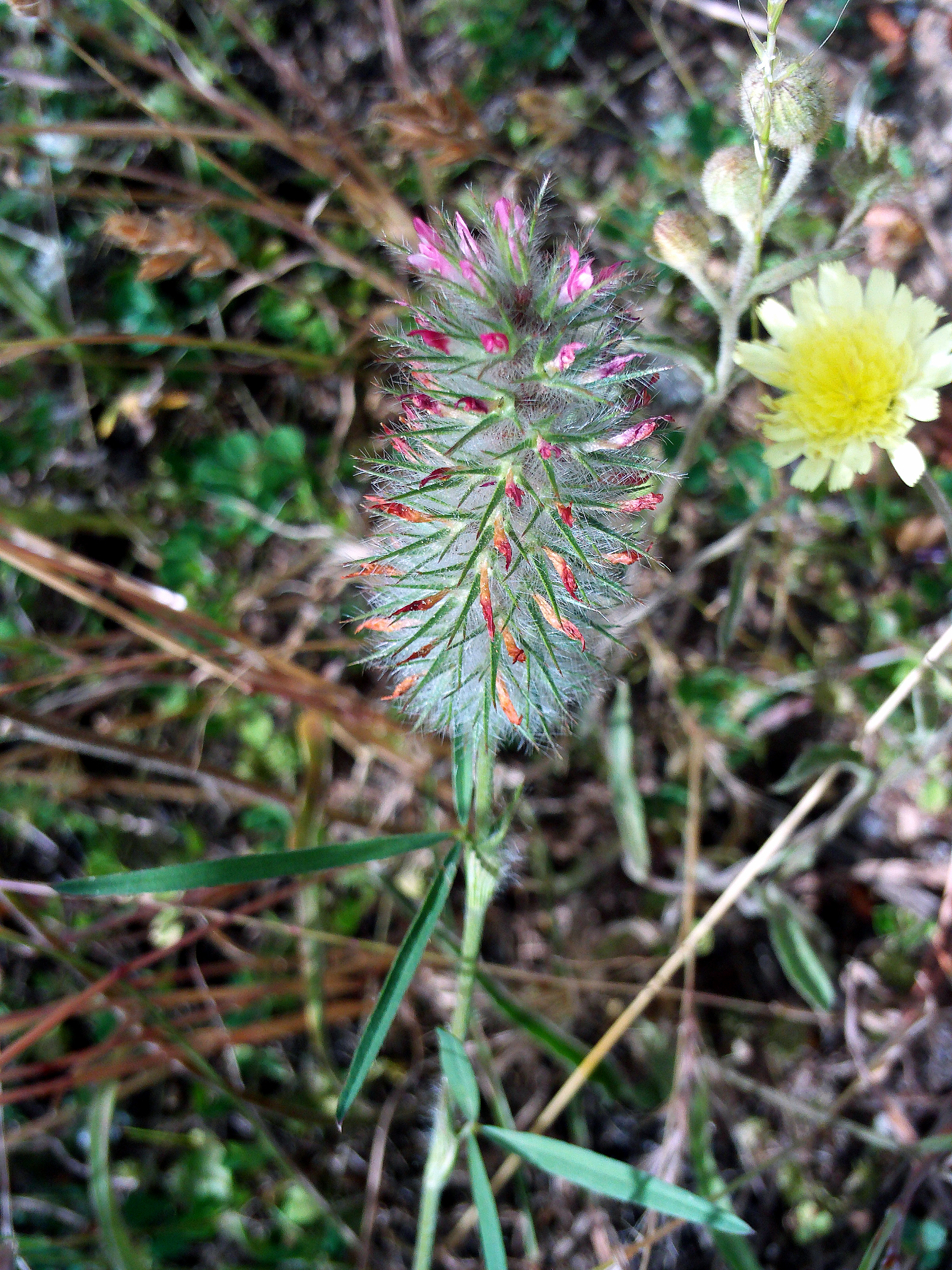

Conservation status
- Least Concern (IUCN 3.1)

Scientific classification
- Kingdom: Plantae
- Clade: Embryophytes
- Clade: Tracheophytes
- Clade: Spermatophytes
- Clade: Angiosperms
- Clade: Eudicots
- Clade: Rosids
- Order: Fabales
- Family: Fabaceae
- Subfamily: Faboideae
- Genus: Trifolium
- Species: T. angustifolium

Binomial name
- Trifolium angustifolium L.

= Trifolium angustifolium =

Species of flowering plant

Trifolium angustifolium is a species of clover known by the common names narrowleaf crimson clover, narrow clover and narrow-leaved clover.

== Description ==
Trifolium angustifolium is an annual herb growing erect in form. The leaves are divided into narrow leaflets which are linear to lance-shaped and measure up to 4.5 centimeters (1 3/4 in) long. The leaves have stipules tipped with bristles. The herbage is hairy in texture.

The inflorescence is a cylindrical spike of flowers measuring 1 to 5 cm (1/2 to 2 in) long. Each flower has a group of sepals (a calyx) with long, hairy, needle-like lobes that harden into bristles as the plant dries. Within each calyx is a pink corolla about 1 cm long.

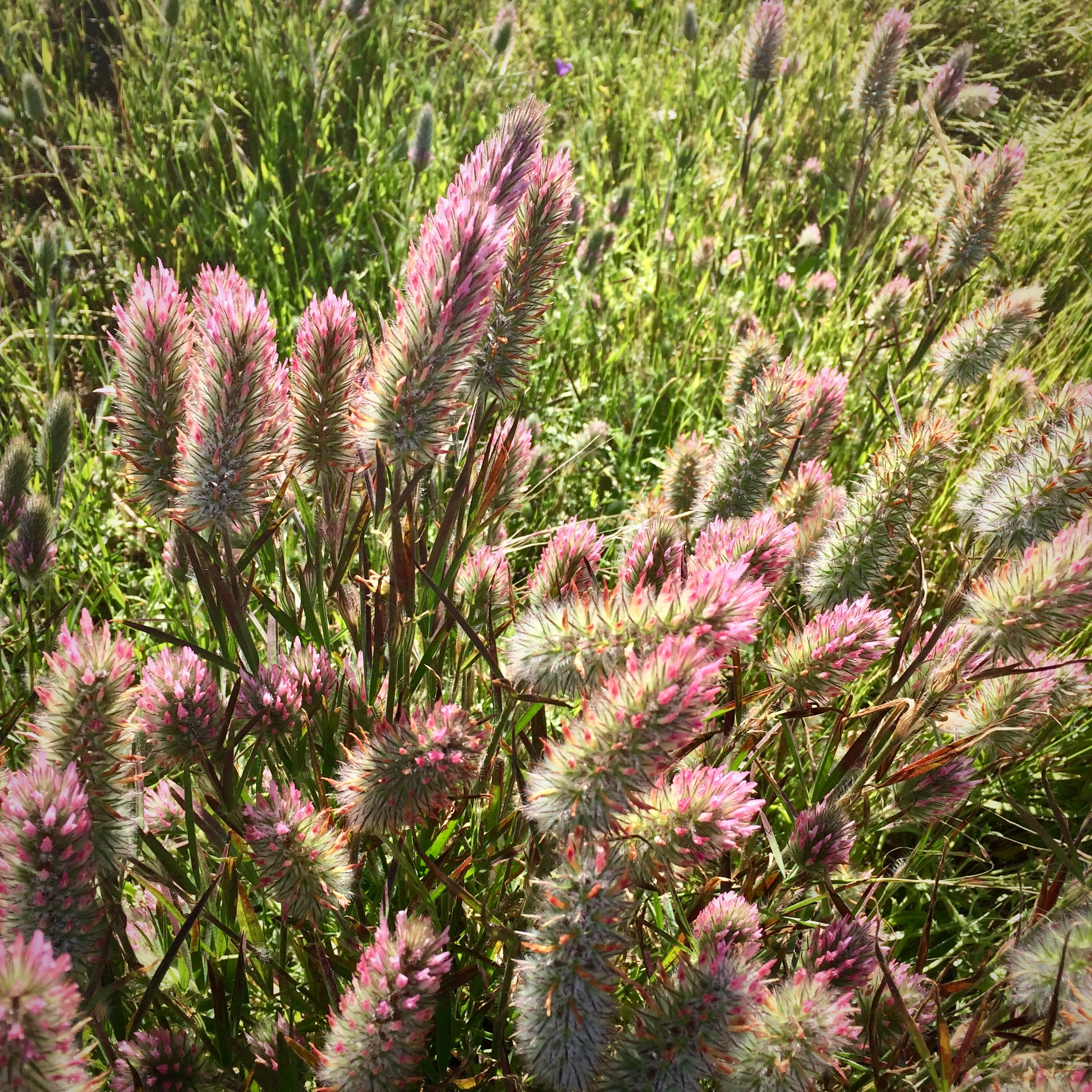
Hearst San Simeon State Park

== Distribution and habitat ==
The species is native to Europe, Asia, and North Africa. It occurs in many types of habitat, including disturbed areas.

It can be found elsewhere as an introduced species, including an invasive species in parts of North America, such as California.
