= Coleophora gallurella =

Scientific classification
- Kingdom: Animalia
- Phylum: Arthropoda
- Clade: Pancrustacea
- Class: Insecta
- Order: Lepidoptera
- Family: Coleophoridae
- Genus: Coleophora
- Species: C. gallurella

Binomial name
- Coleophora gallurella Amsel, 1951

Species of moth

Coleophora gallurella is a moth of the family Coleophoridae. It is found on Sardinia.

The larvae feed on the leaves of Echium italicum.
