= Coleophora taygeti =

Scientific classification
- Kingdom: Animalia
- Phylum: Arthropoda
- Clade: Pancrustacea
- Class: Insecta
- Order: Lepidoptera
- Family: Coleophoridae
- Genus: Coleophora
- Species: C. taygeti

Binomial name
- Coleophora taygeti Baldizzone, 1983

Species of moth

Coleophora taygeti is a moth of the family Coleophoridae. It is found in Spain, France, Italy, Greece and Romania.
