= Coleophora pseudosquamosella =

Scientific classification
- Kingdom: Animalia
- Phylum: Arthropoda
- Clade: Pancrustacea
- Class: Insecta
- Order: Lepidoptera
- Family: Coleophoridae
- Genus: Coleophora
- Species: C. pseudosquamosella

Binomial name
- Coleophora pseudosquamosella Baldizzone & Nel, 2003

Species of moth

Coleophora pseudosquamosella is a moth of the family Coleophoridae. It is found in France and Italy.

The larvae possibly feed on Aster alpinus. They feed on the flowers and fruits of their host plant.
