= Coleophora brunneosignata =

Scientific classification
- Kingdom: Animalia
- Phylum: Arthropoda
- Class: Insecta
- Order: Lepidoptera
- Family: Coleophoridae
- Genus: Coleophora
- Species: C. brunneosignata

Binomial name
- Coleophora brunneosignata Toll, 1944

Synonyms
- Coleophora degenerella Toll, 1960

Species of moth

Coleophora brunneosignata is a moth of the family Coleophoridae. It is found in France, on the island of Sardinia, and the Iberian Peninsula. It has also been seen in Morocco.
