= Elachista maculosella =

Scientific classification
- Domain: Eukaryota
- Kingdom: Animalia
- Phylum: Arthropoda
- Class: Insecta
- Order: Lepidoptera
- Family: Elachistidae
- Genus: Elachista
- Species: E. maculosella

Binomial name
- Elachista maculosella Chretien, 1896

Species of moth

Elachista maculosella is a moth of the family Elachistidae that is found in France, Germany and Italy.
