= Coleophora occitana =

Scientific classification
- Kingdom: Animalia
- Phylum: Arthropoda
- Clade: Pancrustacea
- Class: Insecta
- Order: Lepidoptera
- Family: Coleophoridae
- Genus: Coleophora
- Species: C. occitana

Binomial name
- Coleophora occitana Baldizzone, 1989

Species of moth

Coleophora occitana is a moth of the family Coleophoridae. It is found in France and Italy.
