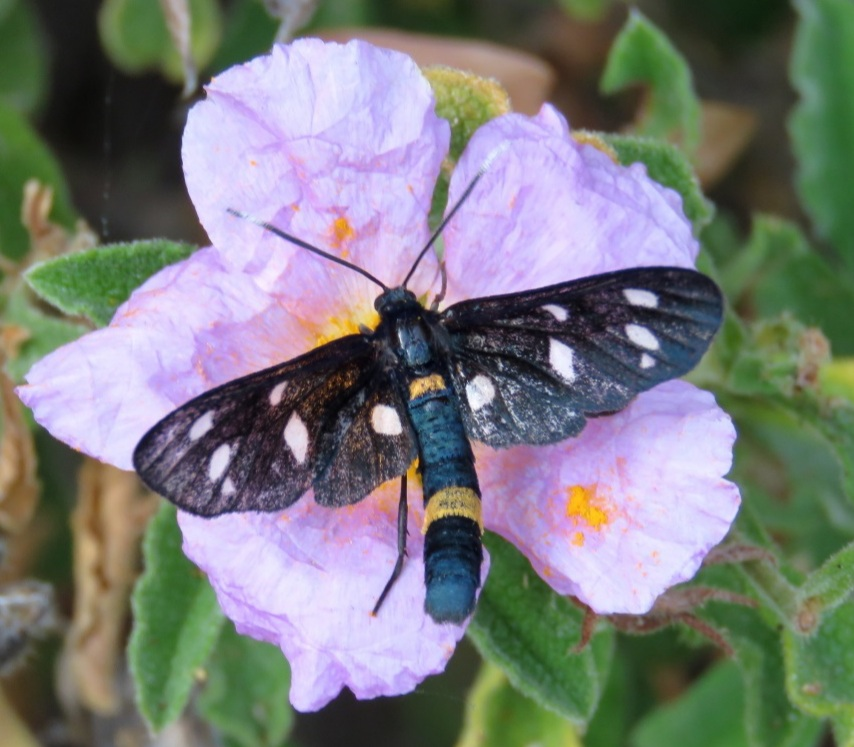

Scientific classification
- Kingdom: Animalia
- Phylum: Arthropoda
- Clade: Pancrustacea
- Class: Insecta
- Order: Lepidoptera
- Superfamily: Noctuoidea
- Family: Erebidae
- Subfamily: Arctiinae
- Genus: Amata
- Species: A. ragazzii

Binomial name
- Amata ragazzii (Turati, 1917)

Synonyms
- Syntomis ragazzii Turati, 1917; Syntomis asperomontana Stauder, 1917; Amata ragazzi asperomontana Stauder, 1917; Syntomis herthula Stauder, 1920

= Amata ragazzii =

Species of moth

Amata ragazzii is a species of moth of the family Erebidae first described by Emilio Turati in 1917. It is found in Italy.

Adults have been recorded on wing in June and July.

The larvae feed on various low-growing plants, including Plantago, Rumex, Galium and Taraxacum species.

== Subspecies ==
- Amata ragazzii ragazzii
- Amata ragazzii asperomontana (Stauder, 1917)
- Amata ragazzii silaensis Obraztsov, 1966
