= Coleophora chiclanensis =

Scientific classification
- Kingdom: Animalia
- Phylum: Arthropoda
- Class: Insecta
- Order: Lepidoptera
- Family: Coleophoridae
- Genus: Coleophora
- Species: C. chiclanensis

Binomial name
- Coleophora chiclanensis Hering, 1936

Species of moth

Coleophora chiclanensis is a moth of the family Coleophoridae. It is found in Spain and on Sardinia.

The larvae feed on Crataegus monogyna. They create a brownish, three-valved, tubular leaf case with a mouth angle of about 60°. Larvae can be found up to April.
