= Coleophora fiorii =

Scientific classification
- Kingdom: Animalia
- Phylum: Arthropoda
- Class: Insecta
- Order: Lepidoptera
- Family: Coleophoridae
- Genus: Coleophora
- Species: C. fiorii

Binomial name
- Coleophora fiorii Toll, 1954

Species of moth

Coleophora fiorii is a moth of the family Coleophoridae. It is found in Spain and Italy.
