= Elachista passerini =

Scientific classification
- Kingdom: Animalia
- Phylum: Arthropoda
- Class: Insecta
- Order: Lepidoptera
- Family: Elachistidae
- Genus: Elachista
- Species: E. passerini

Binomial name
- Elachista passerini Traugott-Olsen, 1996

Species of moth

Elachista passerini is a moth of the family Elachistidae. It is found in France, Spain and Italy.
