= Coleophora ochroflava =

Scientific classification
- Kingdom: Animalia
- Phylum: Arthropoda
- Class: Insecta
- Order: Lepidoptera
- Family: Coleophoridae
- Genus: Coleophora
- Species: C. ochroflava

Binomial name
- Coleophora ochroflava Toll, 1961

Synonyms
- Coleophora halimionella Baldizzone, 1980

Species of moth

Coleophora ochroflava is a moth of the family Coleophoridae. It is found in north-western Russia, Ukraine, Romania, Bulgaria, Greece and Italy.

The larvae feed on the leaves of Atriplex tatarica, Atriplex nitens, Atriplex verrucifera and Halimione partulocoides.
