= Agonopterix ferocella =

Scientific classification
- Kingdom: Animalia
- Phylum: Arthropoda
- Clade: Pancrustacea
- Class: Insecta
- Order: Lepidoptera
- Family: Depressariidae
- Genus: Agonopterix
- Species: A. ferocella

Binomial name
- Agonopterix ferocella (Chretien, 1910)

Synonyms
- Depressaria ferocella Chretien, 1910

Species of moth

Agonopterix ferocella is a moth of the family Depressariidae. It is found in southern France, Italy, Ukraine and Russia.

The larvae feed on Cirsium ferox and Echinops species. Larvae can be found from June to July.
