= Coleophora peterseni =

Scientific classification
- Kingdom: Animalia
- Phylum: Arthropoda
- Clade: Pancrustacea
- Class: Insecta
- Order: Lepidoptera
- Family: Coleophoridae
- Genus: Coleophora
- Species: C. peterseni

Binomial name
- Coleophora peterseni Baldizzone, 1983

Species of moth

Coleophora peterseni is a moth of the family Coleophoridae. It is found on Sardinia.
