= Pyrausta obfuscata =

Scientific classification
- Kingdom: Animalia
- Phylum: Arthropoda
- Clade: Pancrustacea
- Class: Insecta
- Order: Lepidoptera
- Family: Crambidae
- Genus: Pyrausta
- Species: P. obfuscata

Binomial name
- Pyrausta obfuscata (Scopoli, 1763)

Synonyms
- Phalaena obfuscata Scopoli, 1763; Phalaena Pyralis rubralis Villers, 1789; Pyrausta atrosanguinalis Eversmann, 1842; Pyrausta fucatalis Treitschke, 1835; Pyrausta pygmaealis Duponchel, 1832; Tinea bimaculosa Fourcroy, 1785

Species of moth

Pyrausta obfuscata is a species of moth in the family Crambidae. It is found from Spain to Belgium and from France to the Balkan Peninsula, Ukraine and Russia.

Adults are on wing in July and August in one generation per year. They are active during the daytime on sunny days.

The larvae feed on Inula conyzae.
