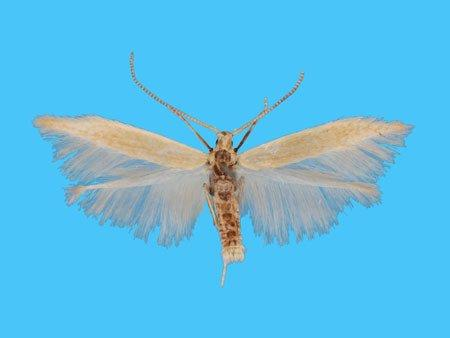

Scientific classification
- Kingdom: Animalia
- Phylum: Arthropoda
- Class: Insecta
- Order: Lepidoptera
- Family: Coleophoridae
- Genus: Coleophora
- Species: C. aestuariella

Binomial name
- Coleophora aestuariella Bradley, 1984

Synonyms
- Hamuliella tanasella Nemes, 2003

= Coleophora aestuariella =

Species of moth

Coleophora aestuariella is a moth of the family Coleophoridae. It is found in Great Britain, France, the Iberian Peninsula, Greece, Bulgaria and Ukraine.

The wingspan is 10–11 mm.

The larvae feed on the seeds of annual sea-blight (Suaeda maritima). They create a moveable case of about 5 mm in length. Larvae can be found from September to June.
