= Coleophora sardiniae =

Scientific classification
- Kingdom: Animalia
- Phylum: Arthropoda
- Clade: Pancrustacea
- Class: Insecta
- Order: Lepidoptera
- Family: Coleophoridae
- Genus: Coleophora
- Species: C. sardiniae

Binomial name
- Coleophora sardiniae Baldizzone, 1983

Species of moth

Coleophora sardiniae is a moth of the family Coleophoridae. It is found on Sardinia.

The larvae feed on Genista corsica and possibly Genista lobelii. They feed on the generative organs of their host plant.
