= Coleophora marcarolensis =

Scientific classification
- Kingdom: Animalia
- Phylum: Arthropoda
- Clade: Pancrustacea
- Class: Insecta
- Order: Lepidoptera
- Family: Coleophoridae
- Genus: Coleophora
- Species: C. marcarolensis

Binomial name
- Coleophora marcarolensis Baldizzone, 2004

Species of moth

Coleophora marcarolensis is a moth of the family Coleophoridae. It is found in Italy.

The larvae feed on Genista pilosa. They feed on the generative organs of their host plant.
