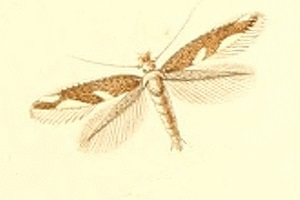

Scientific classification
- Kingdom: Animalia
- Phylum: Arthropoda
- Clade: Pancrustacea
- Class: Insecta
- Order: Lepidoptera
- Family: Bucculatricidae
- Genus: Bucculatrix
- Species: B. albiguttella

Binomial name
- Bucculatrix albiguttella Millière, 1886

Synonyms
- Bucculatrix reisseri Hartig, 1939

= Bucculatrix albiguttella =

Species of moth

Bucculatrix albiguttella is a moth in the family Bucculatricidae. It was first described by Pierre Millière in 1886. The species is found in France (the Alpes Maritimes), Italy and on Sardinia.

The wingspan is about 8 mm. Adults have been recorded on wing in June and July.

The larvae feed on Achillea species. They mine the leaves of their host plant.
