= Coleophora quadristraminella =

Scientific classification
- Kingdom: Animalia
- Phylum: Arthropoda
- Class: Insecta
- Order: Lepidoptera
- Family: Coleophoridae
- Genus: Coleophora
- Species: C. quadristraminella

Binomial name
- Coleophora quadristraminella Toll, 1961

Species of moth

Coleophora quadristraminella is a moth of the family Coleophoridae. It is found in France, Italy, Croatia, North Macedonia and Greece.

The larvae feed on the leaves of Achillea millefolium.
