= Coleophora sardocorsa =

Scientific classification
- Kingdom: Animalia
- Phylum: Arthropoda
- Clade: Pancrustacea
- Class: Insecta
- Order: Lepidoptera
- Family: Coleophoridae
- Genus: Coleophora
- Species: C. sardocorsa

Binomial name
- Coleophora sardocorsa Baldizzone, 1983

Species of moth

Coleophora sardocorsa is a moth of the family Coleophoridae. It is found on Corsica and Sardinia.

The larvae feed on Genista aspalathoides and Genista corsica.
