= Elachista sicula =

Scientific classification
- Kingdom: Animalia
- Phylum: Arthropoda
- Clade: Pancrustacea
- Class: Insecta
- Order: Lepidoptera
- Family: Elachistidae
- Genus: Elachista
- Species: E. sicula

Binomial name
- Elachista sicula Parenti, 1978

Species of moth

Elachista sicula is a moth of the family Elachistidae. It is found on Sicily.

The larvae feed on Briza maxima, Bromus erectus and Lagurus ovatus. They mine the leaves of their host plant.
