= Coleophora albulae =

Scientific classification
- Kingdom: Animalia
- Phylum: Arthropoda
- Class: Insecta
- Order: Lepidoptera
- Family: Coleophoridae
- Genus: Coleophora
- Species: C. albulae

Binomial name
- Coleophora albulae Frey, 1880

Species of moth

Coleophora albulae is a moth of the family Coleophoridae. It is found in France, Switzerland and Italy.
