= Coleophora neli =

Scientific classification
- Kingdom: Animalia
- Phylum: Arthropoda
- Clade: Pancrustacea
- Class: Insecta
- Order: Lepidoptera
- Family: Coleophoridae
- Genus: Coleophora
- Species: C. neli

Binomial name
- Coleophora neli Baldizzone, 2000

Species of moth

Coleophora neli is a moth of the family Coleophoridae. It is found in France and Italy.

The larvae feed on the leaves of Arenaria grandiflora.
