= Coleophora rudella =

Scientific classification
- Kingdom: Animalia
- Phylum: Arthropoda
- Class: Insecta
- Order: Lepidoptera
- Family: Coleophoridae
- Genus: Coleophora
- Species: C. rudella

Binomial name
- Coleophora rudella Toll, 1944

Species of moth

Coleophora rudella is a moth of the family Coleophoridae. It is found in southern France, Spain, the Baleares, Sardinia, Italy and Romania.

The larvae feed on Anthyllis cytisoides.
