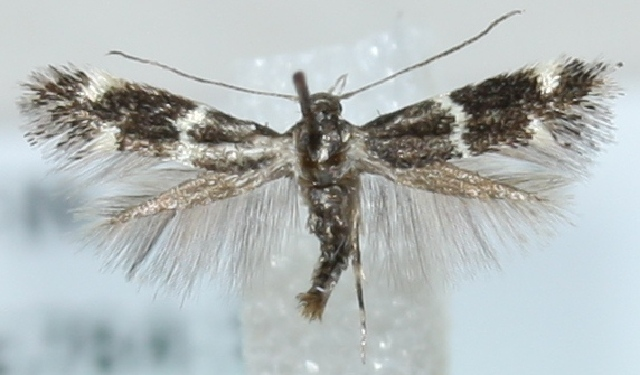

Scientific classification
- Kingdom: Animalia
- Phylum: Arthropoda
- Class: Insecta
- Order: Lepidoptera
- Family: Elachistidae
- Genus: Elachista
- Species: E. elegans

Binomial name
- Elachista elegans Frey, 1859

= Elachista elegans =

Species of moth

Elachista elegans is a moth of the family Elachistidae. It is found from Fennoscandia to Italy, Hungary and the Crimea and from Germany to Russia.

The wingspan is 6–8 millimetres (0.24–0.31 in). Adults are on wing from July to August in one or two generations per year.

The larvae feed on Bromus, Calamagrostis arundinacea, Calamagrostis epigejos, Dactylis, Milium effusum and Poa species. They mine the leaves of their host plant. The frass is mostly deposited along the side. Larvae can found in spring. They are yellowish green with a yellowish brown head.
