= Coleophora murciana =

Scientific classification
- Kingdom: Animalia
- Phylum: Arthropoda
- Class: Insecta
- Order: Lepidoptera
- Family: Coleophoridae
- Genus: Coleophora
- Species: C. murciana

Binomial name
- Coleophora murciana Toll, 1960

Species of moth

Coleophora murciana is a moth of the family Coleophoridae. It is found in Spain, Portugal, France and on Sardinia.
