= Coleophora cyrniella =

Scientific classification
- Kingdom: Animalia
- Phylum: Arthropoda
- Class: Insecta
- Order: Lepidoptera
- Family: Coleophoridae
- Genus: Coleophora
- Species: C. cyrniella

Binomial name
- Coleophora cyrniella Rebel, 1926

Synonyms
- Coleophora dylineella Amsel, 1935; Coleophora simulatella Baldizzone, 1979

Species of moth

Coleophora cyrniella is a moth of the family Coleophoridae. It is found in France, Spain, Italy, Corsica, Sardinia, Saudi Arabia and the Palestinian territories.

The larvae feed on Cistus species and Helianthemum apenninum. They create a lobe case of about 9 mm with a mouth angle of 40°. The case is made out of three to four mined leaves that extend in a disorderly fashion.
