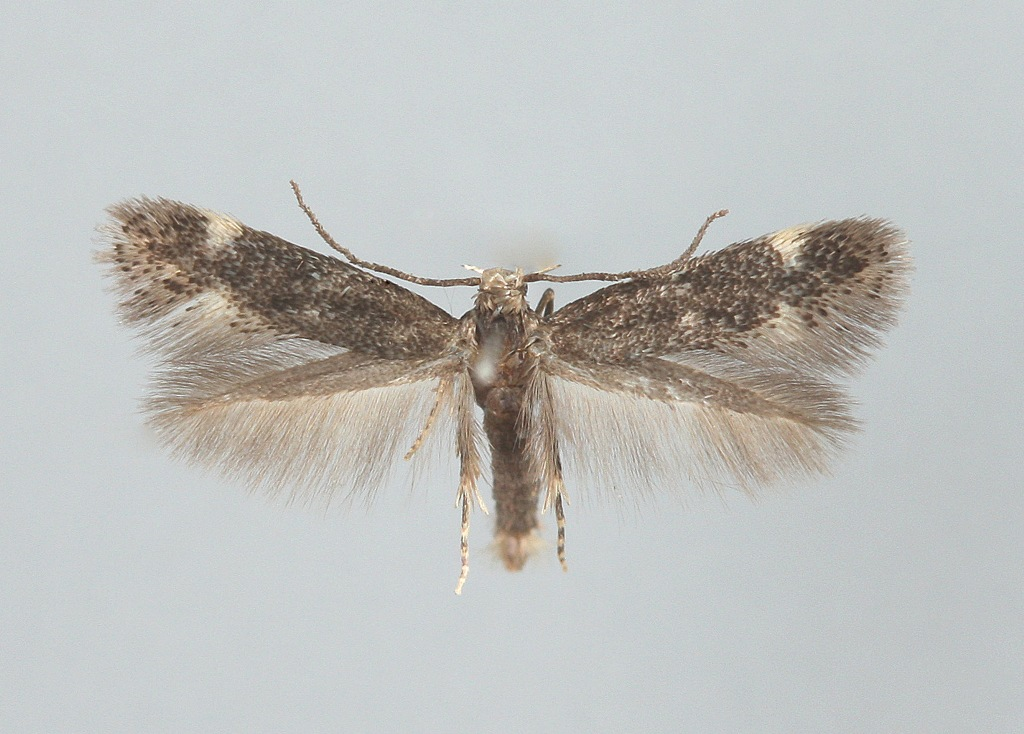

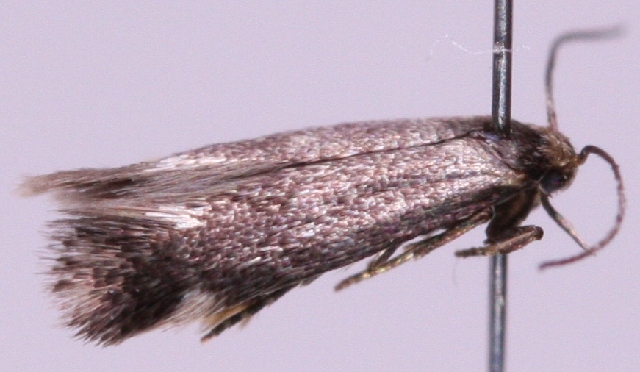

Scientific classification
- Domain: Eukaryota
- Kingdom: Animalia
- Phylum: Arthropoda
- Class: Insecta
- Order: Lepidoptera
- Family: Elachistidae
- Genus: Elachista
- Species: E. humilis

Binomial name
- Elachista humilis Zeller, 1850

Synonyms
- List: Poeciloptilia humiliella Herrich-Schäffer, 1855; Elachista airae Stainton, 1858; Elachista perplexella Stainton, 1858; Elachista occultella Douglas, 1859; Elachista holdenella Stainton, 1854 sensu Pierce & Metcalfe, 1935

= Elachista humilis =

Species of moth

Elachista humilis is a moth of the family Elachistidae found in most of Europe.

== Description ==
The wingspan is 9–10 millimetres (0.35–0.39 in). Adults are on wing from May to July. There are two generations per year. The head is grey, face whitish. Forewings light grey irrorated with dark fuscous; a very indistinct oblique whitish fascia before middle, usually partly or wholly obsolete; a small tornal spot and larger triangular spot on costa somewhat beyond it ochreous-white. Hindwings are grey.

== Biology ==
Larvae have been recorded on bent (Agrostis species), sweet vernal grass (Anthoxanthum odoratum), sedge (Carex species), tufted hairgrass (Deschampsia cespitosa), fescue (Festuca species), Yorkshire fog (Holcus lanatus), reed canary grass (Phalaris arundinacea) and smooth meadow-grass (Poa pratensis), but tufted hairgrass is the main hostplant. The other host plants are not all equally trustworthy because of possible confusion with Elachista canapennella.

== Distribution ==
It is found in most of Europe, except the Iberian Peninsula and the Balkan Peninsula.
