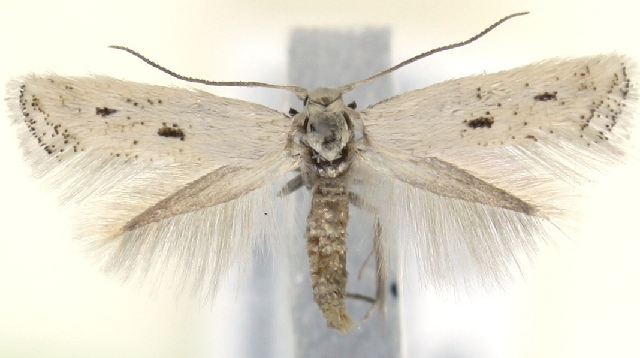

Scientific classification
- Domain: Eukaryota
- Kingdom: Animalia
- Phylum: Arthropoda
- Class: Insecta
- Order: Lepidoptera
- Family: Elachistidae
- Genus: Elachista
- Species: E. boursini

Binomial name
- Elachista boursini Amsel, 1951

= Elachista boursini =

Species of moth

Elachista boursini is a moth of the family Elachistidae that is found on the Iberian Peninsula and Sardinia.
