= Elachista gormella =

Scientific classification
- Kingdom: Animalia
- Phylum: Arthropoda
- Class: Insecta
- Order: Lepidoptera
- Family: Elachistidae
- Genus: Elachista
- Species: E. gormella

Binomial name
- Elachista gormella Nielsen & Traugott-Olsen, 1987

Species of moth

Elachista gormella is a moth of the family Elachistidae. It is found on the Iberian Peninsula and in France, Italy, the Czech Republic, Slovakia, Hungary and Ukraine.
