= Coleophora galatellae =

Scientific classification
- Kingdom: Animalia
- Phylum: Arthropoda
- Class: Insecta
- Order: Lepidoptera
- Family: Coleophoridae
- Genus: Coleophora
- Species: C. galatellae

Binomial name
- Coleophora galatellae Hering, 1942

Synonyms
- Coleophora opacella Toll, 1952

Species of moth

Coleophora galatellae is a moth of the family Coleophoridae. It is found from Germany to the Pyrenees and Italy and from France to Hungary. It is also known from southern Russia.

The larvae feed on Aster linosyris.
