= Coleophora bifrondella =

Scientific classification
- Kingdom: Animalia
- Phylum: Arthropoda
- Class: Insecta
- Order: Lepidoptera
- Family: Coleophoridae
- Genus: Coleophora
- Species: C. bifrondella

Binomial name
- Coleophora bifrondella Walsingham, 1891

Species of moth

Coleophora bifrondella is a moth of the family Coleophoridae. It is found in Spain, France and Italy.

Its scientific name is Coleophora bifrondella Walsingham, 1891

The larvae feed on the leaves of Satureia montana.

Here are some species classification:-

- Kingdom : Animalia
- Phylum: Arthropoda
- Class: Insecta
- Order: Lepidoptera
- Family: Coleophoridae
- Genus: Coleophora Hubner, 1822
