= Elachista arnoldi =

Scientific classification
- Domain: Eukaryota
- Kingdom: Animalia
- Phylum: Arthropoda
- Class: Insecta
- Order: Lepidoptera
- Family: Elachistidae
- Genus: Elachista
- Species: E. arnoldi

Binomial name
- Elachista arnoldi (Koster, 1993)

Synonyms
- Biselachista arnoldi Koster, 1993

Species of moth

Elachista arnoldi is a moth of the family Elachistidae that can be found in the Netherlands and Germany.

The larvae probably feed on Carex. They mine the leaves of their host plant.
