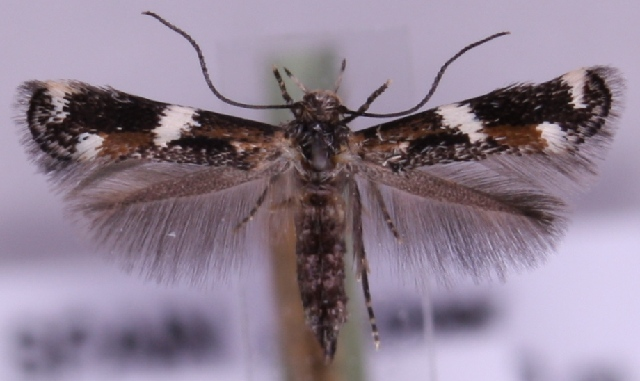

Scientific classification
- Domain: Eukaryota
- Kingdom: Animalia
- Phylum: Arthropoda
- Class: Insecta
- Order: Lepidoptera
- Family: Elachistidae
- Genus: Elachista
- Species: E. igaloensis

Binomial name
- Elachista igaloensis Amsel, 1951

= Elachista igaloensis =

Species of moth

Elachista igaloensis is a moth of the family Elachistidae. It is found on Sardinia and Corsica.
