= Coleophora praecursella =

Scientific classification
- Kingdom: Animalia
- Phylum: Arthropoda
- Clade: Pancrustacea
- Class: Insecta
- Order: Lepidoptera
- Family: Coleophoridae
- Genus: Coleophora
- Species: C. praecursella

Binomial name
- Coleophora praecursella Zeller, 1847

Species of moth

Coleophora praecursella is a moth of the family Coleophoridae. It is found in France, Italy and on Sicily.

The larvae feed on the leaves of Pulicaria odora and possibly Cistus species.
