= Coleophora acutiphaga =

Scientific classification
- Kingdom: Animalia
- Phylum: Arthropoda
- Clade: Pancrustacea
- Class: Insecta
- Order: Lepidoptera
- Family: Coleophoridae
- Genus: Coleophora
- Species: C. acutiphaga

Binomial name
- Coleophora acutiphaga Baldizzone, 1982

Species of moth

Coleophora acutiphaga is a moth of the family Coleophoridae. It is found in Spain, France and on Sardinia.

The larvae feed on Juncus acutus.
