= Coleophora moehringiae =

Scientific classification
- Kingdom: Animalia
- Phylum: Arthropoda
- Clade: Pancrustacea
- Class: Insecta
- Order: Lepidoptera
- Family: Coleophoridae
- Genus: Coleophora
- Species: C. moehringiae

Binomial name
- Coleophora moehringiae Burmann, 1967

Species of moth

Coleophora moehringiae is a moth of the family Coleophoridae. It is found in the Italian Alps. Larvae can be found in mid-May and early June. The species needs two years for its development.
