= Coleophora delmastroella =

Scientific classification
- Kingdom: Animalia
- Phylum: Arthropoda
- Clade: Pancrustacea
- Class: Insecta
- Order: Lepidoptera
- Family: Coleophoridae
- Genus: Coleophora
- Species: C. delmastroella

Binomial name
- Coleophora delmastroella Baldizzone, 2000

Species of moth

Coleophora delmastroella is a moth of the family Coleophoridae. It is found in Italy and France.
