= Coleophora aethiops =

Scientific classification
- Kingdom: Animalia
- Phylum: Arthropoda
- Clade: Pancrustacea
- Class: Insecta
- Order: Lepidoptera
- Family: Coleophoridae
- Genus: Coleophora
- Species: C. aethiops

Binomial name
- Coleophora aethiops Wocke, 1877

Species of moth

Coleophora aethiops is a moth of the family Coleophoridae that is endemic to Italy.
