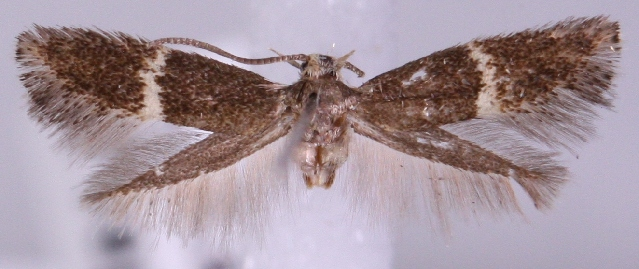
- Elachista fasciola

Scientific classification
- Domain: Eukaryota
- Kingdom: Animalia
- Phylum: Arthropoda
- Class: Insecta
- Order: Lepidoptera
- Family: Elachistidae
- Genus: Elachista
- Species: E. fasciola

Binomial name
- Elachista fasciola Parenti, 1983

= Elachista fasciola =

Species of moth

Elachista fasciola is a moth of the family Elachistidae. It is found from Europe (Latvia, Poland, the Czech Republic, Hungary, Slovakia, Italy) east through Russia to Japan.

The length of the forewings is about 4 millimetres (0.16 in).

The larvae feed on Achnatherum pekinense, Brachypodium sylvaticum, Calamagrostis arundinacea and Elymus repens. They mine the leaves of their host plant.
