= Coleophora dianthivora =

Scientific classification
- Kingdom: Animalia
- Phylum: Arthropoda
- Class: Insecta
- Order: Lepidoptera
- Family: Coleophoridae
- Genus: Coleophora
- Species: C. dianthivora

Binomial name
- Coleophora dianthivora Walsingham, 1901

Species of moth

Coleophora dianthivora is a moth of the family Coleophoridae. It is found in France, Spain and Italy. Full-grown larvae can be found in May.
