= Coleophora tyrrhaenica =

Scientific classification
- Kingdom: Animalia
- Phylum: Arthropoda
- Class: Insecta
- Order: Lepidoptera
- Family: Coleophoridae
- Genus: Coleophora
- Species: C. tyrrhaenica

Binomial name
- Coleophora tyrrhaenica Amsel, 1951

Species of moth

Coleophora tyrrhaenica is a moth of the family Coleophoridae. It is found in France, Sardinia, Italy, Croatia, Hungary, Romania, Bulgaria, Greece and southern Russia.

Adults are on wing in August.
