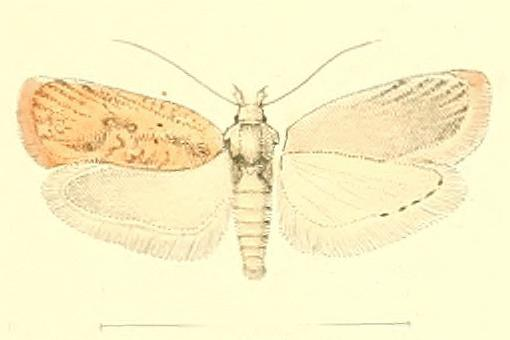

Scientific classification
- Kingdom: Animalia
- Phylum: Arthropoda
- Clade: Pancrustacea
- Class: Insecta
- Order: Lepidoptera
- Family: Depressariidae
- Genus: Agonopterix
- Species: A. irrorata

Binomial name
- Agonopterix irrorata (Staudinger, 1870)

Synonyms
- Depressaria irrorata Staudinger, 1870; Depressaria rubrociliella Rebel, 1891; Depressaria anthriscella Brown, 1886

= Agonopterix irrorata =

Species of moth

Agonopterix irrorata is a moth of the family Depressariidae. It is found in France, Switzerland, Sicily, Croatia, Ukraine, Greece, Crete, Israel and Syria.

The wingspan is 16–20 mm.
