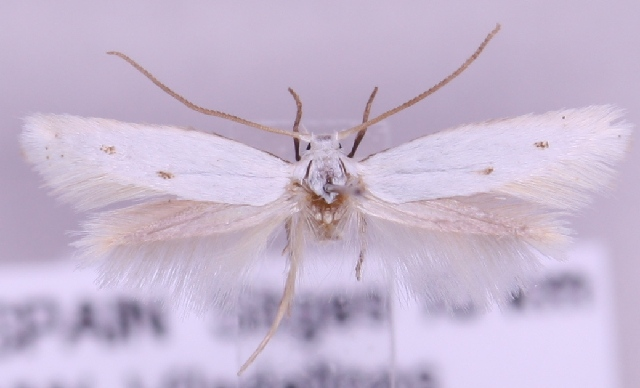

Scientific classification
- Kingdom: Animalia
- Phylum: Arthropoda
- Clade: Pancrustacea
- Class: Insecta
- Order: Lepidoptera
- Family: Elachistidae
- Genus: Elachista
- Species: E. disemiella

Binomial name
- Elachista disemiella Zeller, 1847

= Elachista disemiella =

Species of moth

Elachista disemiella is a moth of the family Elachistidae. It is found in France, on the Iberian Peninsula and in Italy and Hungary.

The larvae feed on Ampelodesmos mauritanicus and Deschampsia cespitosa. They mine the leaves of their host plant.
