= Elachista morandinii =

Scientific classification
- Kingdom: Animalia
- Phylum: Arthropoda
- Clade: Pancrustacea
- Class: Insecta
- Order: Lepidoptera
- Family: Elachistidae
- Genus: Elachista
- Species: E. morandinii

Binomial name
- Elachista morandinii Huemer & Kaila, 2003

Species of moth

Elachista morandinii is a moth of the family Elachistidae that is found in Italy and Hungary.
