= Coleophora etrusca =

Scientific classification
- Kingdom: Animalia
- Phylum: Arthropoda
- Clade: Pancrustacea
- Class: Insecta
- Order: Lepidoptera
- Family: Coleophoridae
- Genus: Coleophora
- Species: C. etrusca

Binomial name
- Coleophora etrusca Baldizzone, 1990

Species of moth

Coleophora etrusca is a moth of the family Coleophoridae. It is found in Italy and Turkey.

The length of the forewings is about 5 mm. Adults are on wing in May and June.
