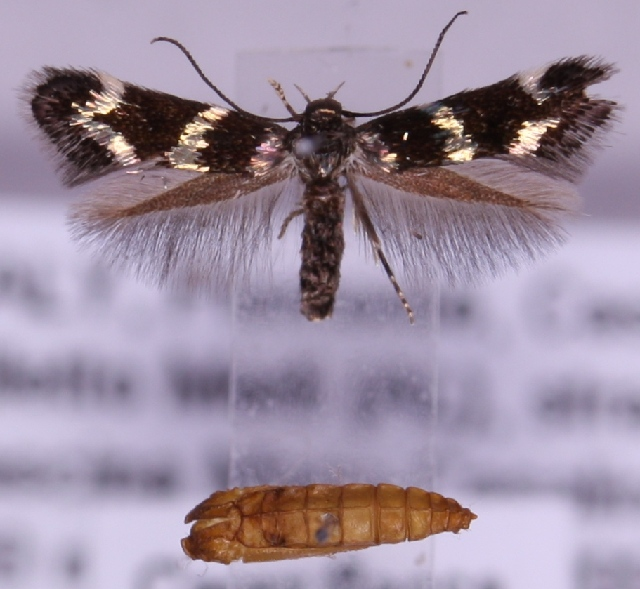

Scientific classification
- Domain: Eukaryota
- Kingdom: Animalia
- Phylum: Arthropoda
- Class: Insecta
- Order: Lepidoptera
- Family: Elachistidae
- Genus: Elachista
- Species: E. differens

Binomial name
- Elachista differens Parenti, 1978

= Elachista differens =

Species of moth

Elachista differens is a moth of the family Elachistidae. It is found in the Alps.

The length of the forewings is 3.5–4 mm in males and 2.5–4 mm in females.

The larvae feed on Carex ferruginea. They mine the leaves of their host plant.
