= Coleophora bassii =

Scientific classification
- Kingdom: Animalia
- Phylum: Arthropoda
- Clade: Pancrustacea
- Class: Insecta
- Order: Lepidoptera
- Family: Coleophoridae
- Genus: Coleophora
- Species: C. bassii

Binomial name
- Coleophora bassii Baldizzone, 1989

Species of moth

Coleophora bassii is a moth of the family Coleophoridae that can be found in France and Italy.
