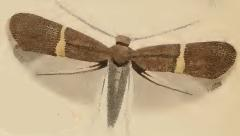

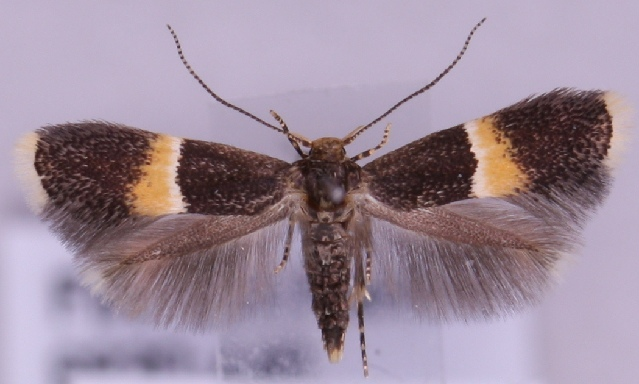

Scientific classification
- Domain: Eukaryota
- Kingdom: Animalia
- Phylum: Arthropoda
- Class: Insecta
- Order: Lepidoptera
- Family: Elachistidae
- Genus: Elachista
- Species: E. bisulcella

Binomial name
- Elachista bisulcella (Duponchel, 1843)

Synonyms
- Lita bisulcella Duponchel, 1843; Elachista zonariella Tengström, 1848

= Elachista bisulcella =

Species of moth

Elachista bisulcella is a moth of the family Elachistidae that is found in Europe.

== Description ==
The wingspan is 8–10 millimetres (0.31–0.39 in). The head is dark grey, face whitish. Forewings are dark fuscous, blackish-sprinkled; a hardly curved whitish central fascia, edged with yellow posteriorly, broader towards dorsum; tips of apical cilia whitish. Hindwings are dark grey. The larva is grey-green; head pale brown; 2 with two brown spots.

== Biology ==
Adults are on wing at the end of June and again in August in two generations per year.

The larvae feed on false-brome (Brachypodium sylvaticum), wood small-reed (Calamagrostis epigejos), upright sedge (Carex stricta), tufted hair-grass (Deschampsia cespitosa) and tall fescue (Festuca arundinacea). They mine the leaves of their host plant. Larvae can be found from autumn to June. The species overwinters within the mine.

== Distribution ==
Found in Europe from Fennoscandia to the Pyrenees, Italy and Romania and from Ireland to Poland.
