= Coleophora breviuscula =

Scientific classification
- Kingdom: Animalia
- Phylum: Arthropoda
- Class: Insecta
- Order: Lepidoptera
- Family: Coleophoridae
- Genus: Coleophora
- Species: C. breviuscula

Binomial name
- Coleophora breviuscula Staudinger, 1880

Species of moth

Coleophora breviuscula is a moth of the family Coleophoridae. It is found in Switzerland, Italy, Greece and Asia Minor.
