= Coleophora mediterranea =

Scientific classification
- Kingdom: Animalia
- Phylum: Arthropoda
- Clade: Pancrustacea
- Class: Insecta
- Order: Lepidoptera
- Family: Coleophoridae
- Genus: Coleophora
- Species: C. mediterranea

Binomial name
- Coleophora mediterranea Baldizzone, 1990

Species of moth

Coleophora mediterranea is a moth of the family Coleophoridae. It is found in Spain, France, Sardinia and Sicily.

The larvae feed on Atriplex littoralis. They feed on the generative organs of their host plant.
