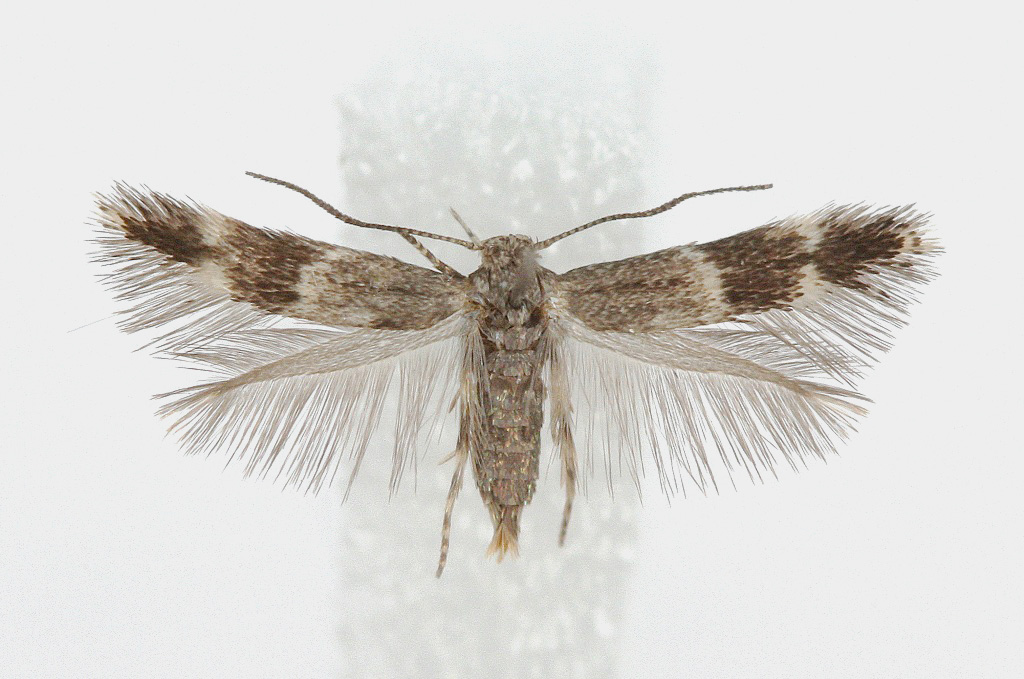
- Female

Scientific classification
- Domain: Eukaryota
- Kingdom: Animalia
- Phylum: Arthropoda
- Class: Insecta
- Order: Lepidoptera
- Family: Elachistidae
- Genus: Elachista
- Species: E. exactella

Binomial name
- Elachista exactella (Herrich-Schäffer, 1855)

Synonyms
- Poeciloptilia exactella Herrich-Schaffer 1855; Cosmiotes exactella (Herrich-Schäffer, 1855); Elachista parvulella (Herrich-Schäffer, 1855); Poeciloptilia parvulella Herrich-Schäffer, 1855; Elachista spectrella Frey, 1885

= Elachista exactella =

Species of moth

Elachista exactella is a moth of the family Elachistidae. It is found from the Iberian Peninsula, east to Romania, north through France and the Benelux to Fennoscandia, east through central Europe to the Baltic region and northern Russia.

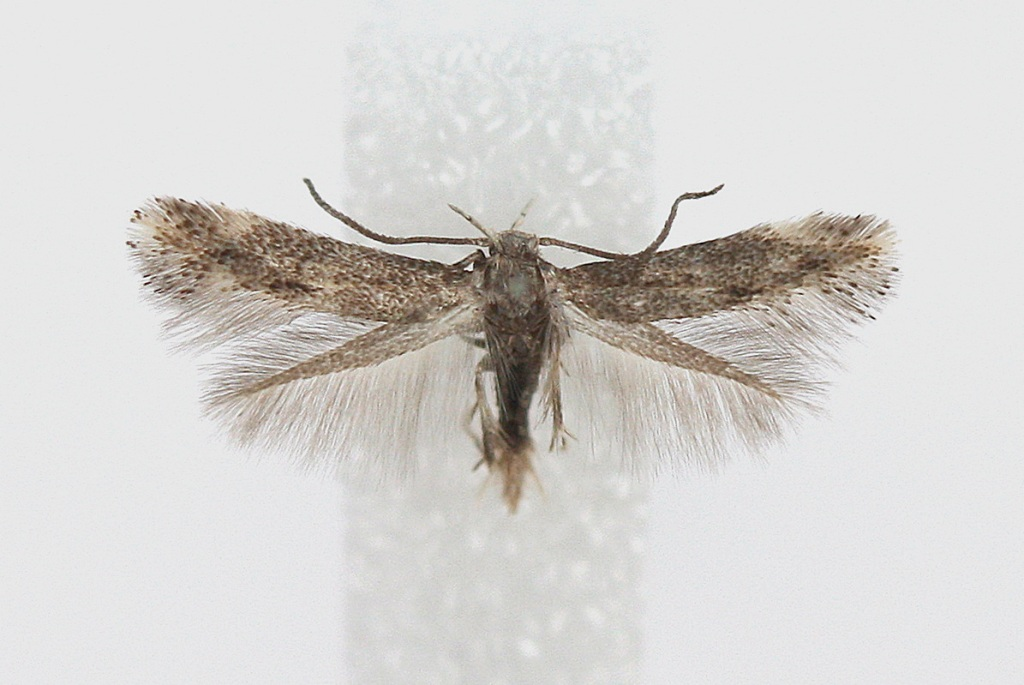
Male

The wingspan is 6–7 millimetres (0.24–0.28 in).

The larvae feed on Deschampsia flexuosa.
