= Alexandre Constant =

French entomologist (1829–1901)

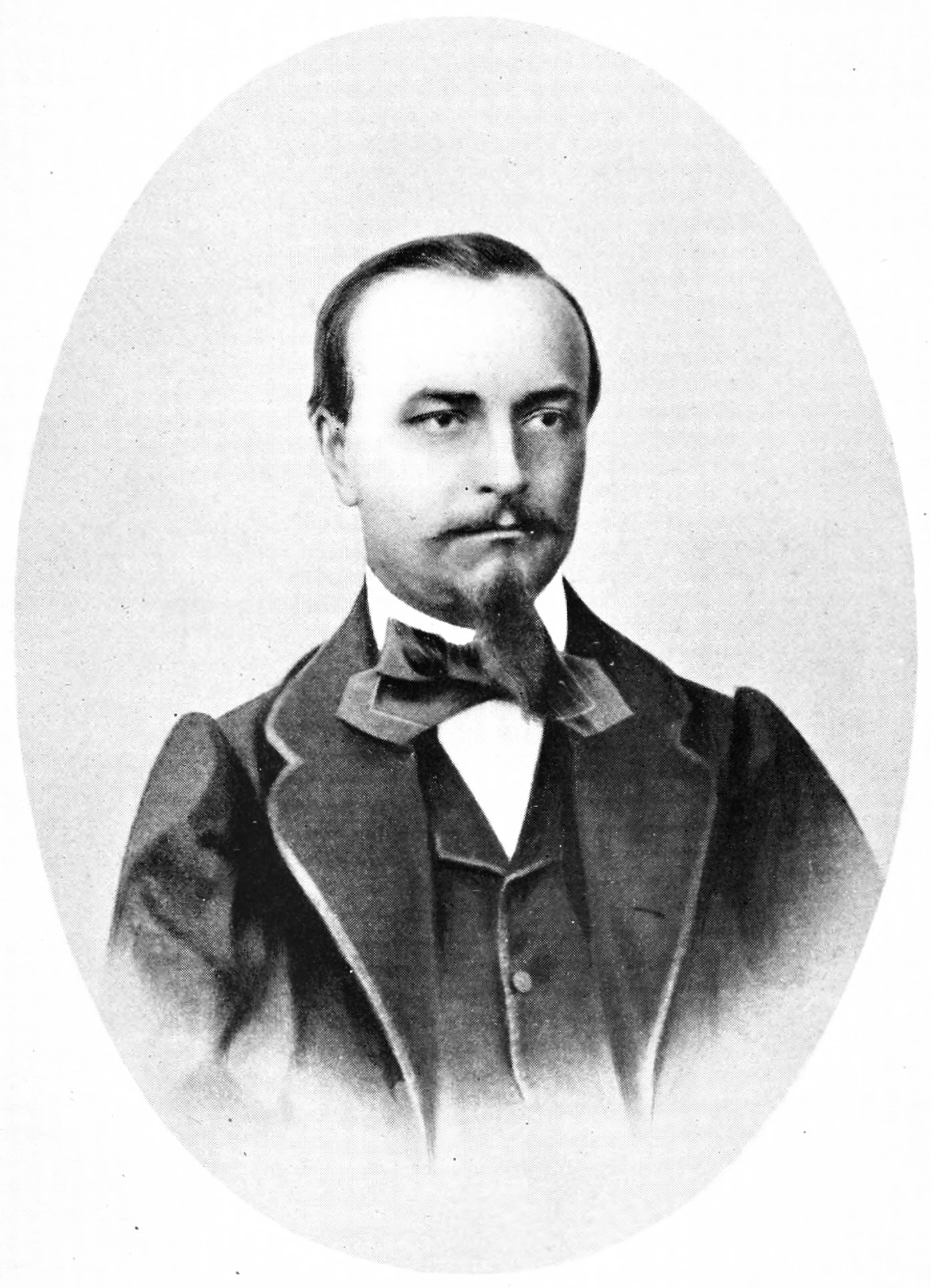
Alexandre Constant

Alexandre Constant also known as Alfred Constant (14 September 1829, Autun – 13 May 1901, Golfe-Juan) was a French entomologist who specialised in Lepidoptera.

Constant was a banker. He became a Member of the Société entomologique de France in 1854. He was principally interested in Microlepidoptera.

== Works ==
Partial list

- Histoire naturelle des papillons (Paris : [Desloges] (1850)
- Catalogue des Lépidoptères de Saône-et-Loire (1866)
- Notes sur quelques Lépidoptères nouveaux Annales de la Société entomologique de France (6) 4 : 201–216, pl. 9 (1884), : 251–262, pl. 10 (1885)
- Descriptions de Lépidoptères nouveaux ou peu connus. Annales de la Société Entomologique de France 6 (8): 161-172 + pl. (1888)
- Descriptions de Microlépidoptères nouveaux ou peu connus Annales de la Société Entomologique de France (6) 10 : 5-16 (1890)
