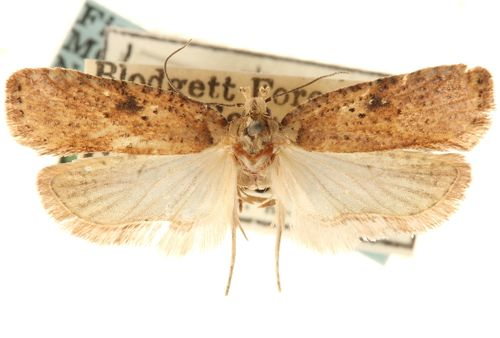

Scientific classification
- Kingdom: Animalia
- Phylum: Arthropoda
- Clade: Pancrustacea
- Class: Insecta
- Order: Lepidoptera
- Family: Depressariidae
- Genus: Agonopterix
- Species: A. fusciterminella

Binomial name
- Agonopterix fusciterminella J. F. G. Clarke, 1941

= Agonopterix fusciterminella =

Species of moth

Agonopterix fusciterminella is a moth in the family Depressariidae. It was described by John Frederick Gates Clarke in 1941. It is found in North America, where it has been recorded from California to southern British Columbia, as well as from North Carolina and Tennessee.

The wingspan is 22–25 mm. The forewings are ochreous, overlaid with reddish brown and sprinkled with fuscous to black scales. The extreme base is ochreous, in the dorsal half followed by a strong red-brown patch. There are two small black spots at the base of the cell, followed by a strong fuscous or black cloud. The latter surrounded by reddish-brown suffusion. The hindwings are whitish, suffused apically with fuscous.

The larvae feed on Senecio aronicoides and Cacaliopsis nardosmia.
