= Agonopterix deliciosella =

Scientific classification
- Kingdom: Animalia
- Phylum: Arthropoda
- Clade: Pancrustacea
- Class: Insecta
- Order: Lepidoptera
- Family: Depressariidae
- Genus: Agonopterix
- Species: A. deliciosella

Binomial name
- Agonopterix deliciosella Turati, 1924

Species of moth

Agonopterix deliciosella is a moth in the family of the Depressariidae. It was described by Turati in 1924. It is found in Libya.
