= Agonopterix pullella =

Scientific classification
- Kingdom: Animalia
- Phylum: Arthropoda
- Clade: Pancrustacea
- Class: Insecta
- Order: Lepidoptera
- Family: Depressariidae
- Genus: Agonopterix
- Species: A. pullella

Binomial name
- Agonopterix pullella Hannemann, 1971

Species of moth

Agonopterix pullella is a moth in the family Depressariidae. It was described by Hans-Joachim Hannemann in 1971. It is found in Mongolia.
