= Agonopterix mikkolai =

Scientific classification
- Kingdom: Animalia
- Phylum: Arthropoda
- Clade: Pancrustacea
- Class: Insecta
- Order: Lepidoptera
- Family: Depressariidae
- Genus: Agonopterix
- Species: A. mikkolai

Binomial name
- Agonopterix mikkolai Lvovsky, 2011

Species of moth

Agonopterix mikkolai is a moth in the family Depressariidae. It was described by Alexandr L. Lvovsky in 2011. It is found in Nepal.

The wingspan is about 25 millimetres (0.98 in).
