= Agonopterix elbursella =

Scientific classification
- Kingdom: Animalia
- Phylum: Arthropoda
- Clade: Pancrustacea
- Class: Insecta
- Order: Lepidoptera
- Family: Depressariidae
- Genus: Agonopterix
- Species: A. elbursella

Binomial name
- Agonopterix elbursella Hannemann, 1976

Species of moth

Agonopterix elbursella is a moth in the family Depressariidae. It was described by Hans-Joachim Hannemann in 1976. It is found in Iran.
