= Agonopterix fruticosella =

Scientific classification
- Kingdom: Animalia
- Phylum: Arthropoda
- Clade: Pancrustacea
- Class: Insecta
- Order: Lepidoptera
- Family: Depressariidae
- Genus: Agonopterix
- Species: A. fruticosella

Binomial name
- Agonopterix fruticosella (Walsingham, 1903)

Synonyms
- Depressaria fruticosella Walsingham, 1903; Depressaria rebeli Hering, 1936; Depressaria rigidella Chretien, 1907

Species of moth

Agonopterix fruticosella is a moth of the family Depressariidae. It is found in southern France and on the Iberian Peninsula.

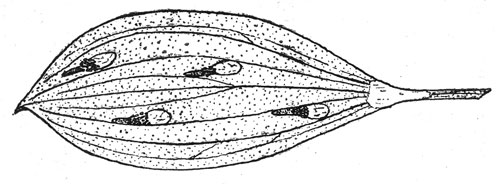
Mine

The wingspan is 20–23 mm. The forewings are pale stony cinereous (ash grey) evenly speckled with small groups of blackish scales. The hindwings are shining, pale tawny cinereous.

The larvae feed on Bupleurum rigidum species. They initially mine the leaves of their host plant. Larvae can be found at the end of June.
