= Agonopterix malaisei =

Scientific classification
- Kingdom: Animalia
- Phylum: Arthropoda
- Clade: Pancrustacea
- Class: Insecta
- Order: Lepidoptera
- Family: Depressariidae
- Genus: Agonopterix
- Species: A. malaisei

Binomial name
- Agonopterix malaisei (Diakonoff, 1952)

Synonyms
- Cryptolechia malaisei Diakonoff, 1952

Species of moth

Agonopterix malaisei is a moth in the family Depressariidae. It was described by Alexey Diakonoff in 1952. It is found in Myanmar.
