= Agonopterix perstrigella =

Scientific classification
- Kingdom: Animalia
- Phylum: Arthropoda
- Clade: Pancrustacea
- Class: Insecta
- Order: Lepidoptera
- Family: Depressariidae
- Genus: Agonopterix
- Species: A. perstrigella

Binomial name
- Agonopterix perstrigella (Chretien, 1925)

Synonyms
- Depressaria perstrigella Chretien, 1925; Depressaria scorpii Chrétien, 1929

Species of moth

Agonopterix perstrigella is a moth of the family Depressariidae. It is found in France and Spain.
