= Agonopterix parinkini =

Scientific classification
- Kingdom: Animalia
- Phylum: Arthropoda
- Clade: Pancrustacea
- Class: Insecta
- Order: Lepidoptera
- Family: Depressariidae
- Genus: Agonopterix
- Species: A. parinkini

Binomial name
- Agonopterix parinkini Lvovsky, 2011

Species of moth

Agonopterix parinkini is a moth in the family Depressariidae. It was described by Alexandr L. Lvovsky in 2011. It is found in Nepal.

The wingspan is 18–23 millimetres (0.71–0.91 in).

== Etymology ==
The species is named are after the Russian zoologist Alexandr Petrovich Parinkin.
