= Agonopterix banatica =

Scientific classification
- Kingdom: Animalia
- Phylum: Arthropoda
- Clade: Pancrustacea
- Class: Insecta
- Order: Lepidoptera
- Family: Depressariidae
- Genus: Agonopterix
- Species: A. banatica

Binomial name
- Agonopterix banatica Georgesco, 1965

Species of moth

Agonopterix banatica is a moth of the family Depressariidae. It is found in Romania.
