= Agonopterix intersecta =

Scientific classification
- Kingdom: Animalia
- Phylum: Arthropoda
- Clade: Pancrustacea
- Class: Insecta
- Order: Lepidoptera
- Family: Depressariidae
- Genus: Agonopterix
- Species: A. intersecta

Binomial name
- Agonopterix intersecta (Filipjev, 1929)

Synonyms
- Depressaria intersecta Filipjev, 1929

Species of moth

Agonopterix intersecta is a moth in the family Depressariidae. It was described by Ivan Nikolayevich Filipjev in 1929. It is found in Mongolia, the Russian Far East and Japan.
