= Agonopterix bakriella =

Scientific classification
- Kingdom: Animalia
- Phylum: Arthropoda
- Clade: Pancrustacea
- Class: Insecta
- Order: Lepidoptera
- Family: Depressariidae
- Genus: Agonopterix
- Species: A. bakriella

Binomial name
- Agonopterix bakriella (Amsel, 1958)

Synonyms
- Agonopteryx bakriella Amsel, 1958

Species of moth

Agonopterix bakriella is a moth in the family Depressariidae. It was described by Hans Georg Amsel in 1958. It is found in Iran.
