= Agonopterix glyphidopa =

Scientific classification
- Kingdom: Animalia
- Phylum: Arthropoda
- Clade: Pancrustacea
- Class: Insecta
- Order: Lepidoptera
- Family: Depressariidae
- Genus: Agonopterix
- Species: A. glyphidopa

Binomial name
- Agonopterix glyphidopa (Meyrick, 1928)

Synonyms
- Depressaria glyphidopa Meyrick, 1928

Species of moth

Agonopterix glyphidopa is a moth in the family Depressariidae. It was described by Edward Meyrick in 1828. It is found in South Africa.

The wingspan is about 17 mm. The forewings are pale ochreous, with a narrowly black base. The costal area is tinged with crimson anteriorly and there is an oblong dark fuscous patch occupying the dorsal two-thirds of the wing from near the base to two-third, followed posteriorly and above beyond the middle by some fuscous suffusion and dark fuscous irroration. The hindwings are light grey.
