= Agonopterix antennariella =

Scientific classification
- Kingdom: Animalia
- Phylum: Arthropoda
- Clade: Pancrustacea
- Class: Insecta
- Order: Lepidoptera
- Family: Depressariidae
- Genus: Agonopterix
- Species: A. antennariella

Binomial name
- Agonopterix antennariella J. F. G. Clarke, 1941

Synonyms
- Agonopteryx victori de Lesse & Viette, 1949

Species of moth

Agonopterix antennariella is a moth in the family Depressariidae. It was described by John Frederick Gates Clarke in 1941. It is found in Washington, British Columbia and western Greenland.

The wingspan is 17–24 mm. The forewings are red brown, the scales lightly tipped with carmine. There are two small black discal spots at the basal third, followed by a few cinereous (ash-gray) scales. A white spot, edged with black, is found at the end of the cell. The apical third of the wing is shaded with cinereous. The hindwings are light fuscous.

The larvae feed on Antennaria luzuloides.
