= Agonopterix melancholica =

Scientific classification
- Kingdom: Animalia
- Phylum: Arthropoda
- Clade: Pancrustacea
- Class: Insecta
- Order: Lepidoptera
- Family: Depressariidae
- Genus: Agonopterix
- Species: A. melancholica

Binomial name
- Agonopterix melancholica (Rebel, 1917)

Synonyms
- Depressaria melancholica Rebel, 1917; Depressaria funebrella Caradja, 1920

Species of moth

Agonopterix melancholica is a moth of the family Depressariidae. It is found in Romania and Russia.

The wingspan is 21–23 mm.
