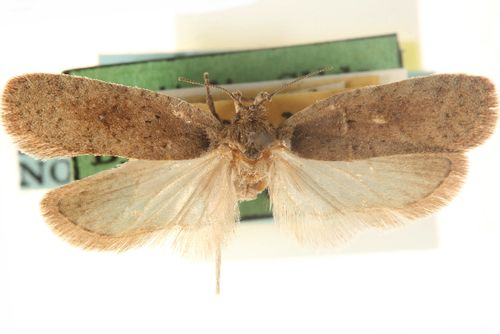

Scientific classification
- Kingdom: Animalia
- Phylum: Arthropoda
- Clade: Pancrustacea
- Class: Insecta
- Order: Lepidoptera
- Family: Depressariidae
- Genus: Agonopterix
- Species: A. toega

Binomial name
- Agonopterix toega Hodges, 1974

= Agonopterix toega =

Species of moth

Agonopterix toega is a moth in the family Depressariidae. It was described by Ronald W. Hodges in 1974. It is found in North America, where it has been recorded from California.

The larvae feed on Sanicula species.
