= Agonopterix anticella =

Scientific classification
- Kingdom: Animalia
- Phylum: Arthropoda
- Clade: Pancrustacea
- Class: Insecta
- Order: Lepidoptera
- Family: Depressariidae
- Genus: Agonopterix
- Species: A. anticella

Binomial name
- Agonopterix anticella (Erschoff, [1877])

Synonyms
- Depressaria anticella Erschoff, [1877]

Species of moth

Agonopterix anticella is a moth in the family Depressariidae. It was described by Nikolay Grigoryevich Erschoff in 1877. It is found in Irkutsk Oblast, Russia.
