= Agonopterix sapporensis =

Scientific classification
- Kingdom: Animalia
- Phylum: Arthropoda
- Clade: Pancrustacea
- Class: Insecta
- Order: Lepidoptera
- Family: Depressariidae
- Genus: Agonopterix
- Species: A. sapporensis

Binomial name
- Agonopterix sapporensis (Matsumura, 1931)

Synonyms
- Depressaria sapporensis Matsumura, 1931

Species of moth

Agonopterix sapporensis is a moth in the family Depressariidae. It was described by Shōnen Matsumura in 1931. It is found on the Japanese island of Hokkaido and the Russian Far East.
