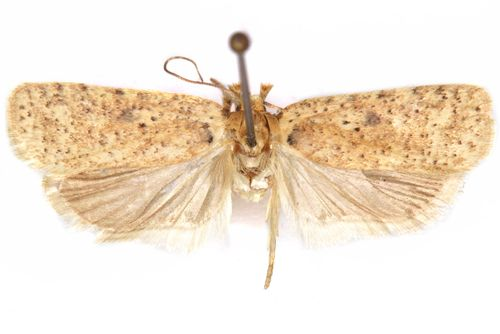

Scientific classification
- Kingdom: Animalia
- Phylum: Arthropoda
- Clade: Pancrustacea
- Class: Insecta
- Order: Lepidoptera
- Family: Depressariidae
- Genus: Agonopterix
- Species: A. lecontella

Binomial name
- Agonopterix lecontella (Clemens, 1860)

Synonyms
- Depressaria lecontella Clemens, 1860

= Agonopterix lecontella =

Species of moth

Agonopterix lecontella is a moth in the family Depressariidae. It was described by James Brackenridge Clemens in 1860. It is found in North America, where it has been recorded from Pennsylvania.

The forewings are dark ocherous, with dispersed blackish-brown dots throughout the wing. The hindwings are pale grayish ocherous.

The larvae feed on Baptisia tinctoria.
