= Agonopterix kuznetzovi =

Scientific classification
- Kingdom: Animalia
- Phylum: Arthropoda
- Clade: Pancrustacea
- Class: Insecta
- Order: Lepidoptera
- Family: Depressariidae
- Genus: Agonopterix
- Species: A. kuznetzovi

Binomial name
- Agonopterix kuznetzovi Lvovsky, 1983

Species of moth

Agonopterix kuznetzovi is a moth of the family Depressariidae. It is found in Great Britain and Russia.

The wingspan is 15–20 mm. Adults are on wing from July to October and (after overwintering) in spring.

The larvae feed on Serratula tinctoria. They initially mine the leaves of their host plant. Larvae can be found from late May to June.
