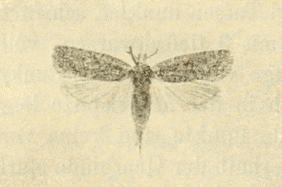

Scientific classification
- Kingdom: Animalia
- Phylum: Arthropoda
- Clade: Pancrustacea
- Class: Insecta
- Order: Lepidoptera
- Family: Depressariidae
- Genus: Agonopterix
- Species: A. tschorbadjiewi

Binomial name
- Agonopterix tschorbadjiewi (Rebel, 1916)

Synonyms
- Depressaria tschorbadjiewi Rebel, 1916

= Agonopterix tschorbadjiewi =

Species of moth

Agonopterix tschorbadjiewi is a moth of the family Depressariidae. It is found in Bulgaria.

The wingspan is about 25 mm.
