= Agonopterix cyrniella =

Scientific classification
- Kingdom: Animalia
- Phylum: Arthropoda
- Clade: Pancrustacea
- Class: Insecta
- Order: Lepidoptera
- Family: Depressariidae
- Genus: Agonopterix
- Species: A. cyrniella

Binomial name
- Agonopterix cyrniella (Rebel, 1929)

Synonyms
- Depressaria cyrniella Rebel, 1929

Species of moth

Agonopterix cyrniella is a moth of the family Depressariidae. It is found on Corsica.
