= Agonopterix mikomoensis =

Scientific classification
- Kingdom: Animalia
- Phylum: Arthropoda
- Clade: Pancrustacea
- Class: Insecta
- Order: Lepidoptera
- Family: Depressariidae
- Genus: Agonopterix
- Species: A. mikomoensis

Binomial name
- Agonopterix mikomoensis Fujisawa, 1985

Species of moth

Agonopterix mikomoensis is a moth in the family Depressariidae. It was described by K. Fujisawa in 1985. It is found in Japan.
