= Agonopterix crassiventrella =

Scientific classification
- Kingdom: Animalia
- Phylum: Arthropoda
- Clade: Pancrustacea
- Class: Insecta
- Order: Lepidoptera
- Family: Depressariidae
- Genus: Agonopterix
- Species: A. crassiventrella

Binomial name
- Agonopterix crassiventrella (Rebel, 1891)

Synonyms
- Depressaria crassiventrella Rebel, 1891

Species of moth

Agonopterix crassiventrella is a moth of the family Depressariidae. It is found in Croatia.

The wingspan is about 23.5 mm.
