= Agonopterix grammatopa =

Scientific classification
- Kingdom: Animalia
- Phylum: Arthropoda
- Clade: Pancrustacea
- Class: Insecta
- Order: Lepidoptera
- Family: Depressariidae
- Genus: Agonopterix
- Species: A. grammatopa

Binomial name
- Agonopterix grammatopa (Meyrick, 1920)

Synonyms
- Depressaria grammatopa Meyrick, 1920

Species of moth

Agonopterix grammatopa is a moth in the family Depressariidae. It was described by Edward Meyrick in 1920. It is found in South Africa.

The wingspan is about 18 mm. The forewings are light brownish sprinkled with fuscous, with an extremely oblique black dash and a cloudy blackish dot. The hindwings are pale greyish, the veins suffusedly darker.
