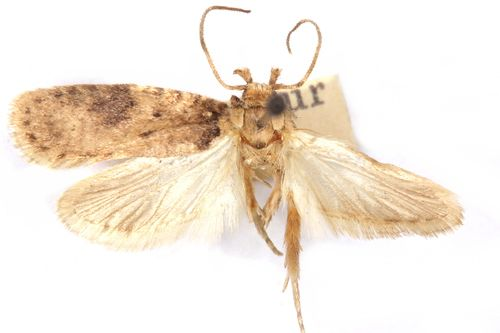

Scientific classification
- Kingdom: Animalia
- Phylum: Arthropoda
- Clade: Pancrustacea
- Class: Insecta
- Order: Lepidoptera
- Family: Depressariidae
- Genus: Agonopterix
- Species: A. pteleae

Binomial name
- Agonopterix pteleae Barnes & Busck, 1920

Synonyms
- Agonopteryx pteleae

= Agonopterix pteleae =

Species of moth

Agonopterix pteleae is a moth in the family Depressariidae. It was described by William Barnes and August Busck in 1920. It is found in North America, where it has been recorded from Illinois, Michigan and Ohio.

The wingspan is 20–22 mm. The forewings are light ocherous brown, mottled and suffused with black and brown. The base at the inner angle is whitish ocherous, broadly edged with black and there is a large blackish-fuscous blotch from the costa to the end of the cell, as well as a series of blackish-fuscous spots along the costa and around the termen. The first and second discal spots are black, the latter obscured by the large costal blotch. The hindwings are light ocherous fuscous.

The larvae feed on Ptelea trifoliata.
