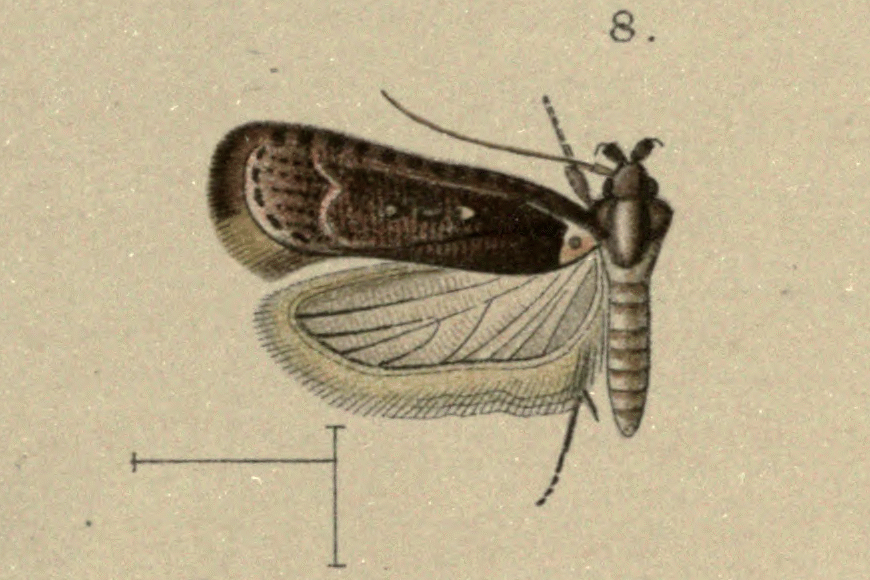

Scientific classification
- Kingdom: Animalia
- Phylum: Arthropoda
- Clade: Pancrustacea
- Class: Insecta
- Order: Lepidoptera
- Family: Depressariidae
- Genus: Agonopterix
- Species: A. perezi

Binomial name
- Agonopterix perezi Walsingham, 1908

= Agonopterix perezi =

Species of moth

Agonopterix perezi is a moth of the family Depressariidae. It is found on the Canary Islands and Madeira.

The wingspan is 16–20 mm. The forewings are tawny reddish fuscous with smoky black suffusion and speckling. The hindwings are shining pale cinereous.

The larvae feed on Ruta pinnata. They roll the leaves of their host plant. The larvae are pale green.

== Etymology ==
The species is named for Dr. George Perez.
