= Agonopterix monotona =

Scientific classification
- Kingdom: Animalia
- Phylum: Arthropoda
- Clade: Pancrustacea
- Class: Insecta
- Order: Lepidoptera
- Family: Depressariidae
- Genus: Agonopterix
- Species: A. monotona

Binomial name
- Agonopterix monotona Caradja, 1927

Species of moth

Agonopterix monotona is a moth in the family Depressariidae. It was described by Aristide Caradja in 1927. It is found in China.
