= Agonopterix cachritis =

Scientific classification
- Kingdom: Animalia
- Phylum: Arthropoda
- Clade: Pancrustacea
- Class: Insecta
- Order: Lepidoptera
- Family: Depressariidae
- Genus: Agonopterix
- Species: A. cachritis

Binomial name
- Agonopterix cachritis (Staudinger, 1859)

Synonyms
- Depressaria cachritis Staudinger, 1859; Depressaria epicachritis Ragonot, 1895

Species of moth

Agonopterix cachritis is a moth of the family Depressariidae. It is found in Spain and on Sardinia and Cyprus. It has also been reported from North Africa and Syria.

The wingspan is 17–22 mm.
