= Agonopterix pavida =

Scientific classification
- Kingdom: Animalia
- Phylum: Arthropoda
- Clade: Pancrustacea
- Class: Insecta
- Order: Lepidoptera
- Family: Depressariidae
- Genus: Agonopterix
- Species: A. pavida

Binomial name
- Agonopterix pavida (Meyrick, 1913)

Synonyms
- Depressaria pavida Meyrick, 1913

Species of moth

Agonopterix pavida is a moth in the family Depressariidae. It was described by Edward Meyrick in 1913. It is found in Asia Minor.

The wingspan is about 23 mm. The forewings are pale pinkish ochreous tinged with grey, and strewn with undefined dots and strigulae of blackish scales. There is a pale basal spot, edged on the dorsal half with blackish suffusion and the costa is spotted with blackish. The discal stigmata is blackish, first preceded by a similar dot obliquely before and above it, the second larger. The hindwings are pale greyish ochreous.
