= Agonopterix vietnamella =

Scientific classification
- Kingdom: Animalia
- Phylum: Arthropoda
- Clade: Pancrustacea
- Class: Insecta
- Order: Lepidoptera
- Family: Depressariidae
- Genus: Agonopterix
- Species: A. vietnamella

Binomial name
- Agonopterix vietnamella Lvovsky, 2013

Synonyms
- Agonopterix (Subagonopterix) vietnamella

Species of moth

Agonopterix vietnamella is a moth in the family Depressariidae. It was described by Alexandr L. Lvovsky in 2013. It is found in Vietnam.
