= Agonopterix caucasiella =

Scientific classification
- Kingdom: Animalia
- Phylum: Arthropoda
- Clade: Pancrustacea
- Class: Insecta
- Order: Lepidoptera
- Family: Depressariidae
- Genus: Agonopterix
- Species: A. caucasiella

Binomial name
- Agonopterix caucasiella Karsholt, Lvovsky & Nielsen, 2006

Species of moth

Agonopterix caucasiella is a moth in the family Depressariidae. It was described by Ole Karsholt, Alexandr L. Lvovsky and Charlotte Nielsen in 2006. It is found in the Caucasus.

The larvae feed on Heracleum mantegazzianum. They feed on the buds, flowers and developing fruits within the umbels.
