= Agonopterix pergandeella =

Scientific classification
- Kingdom: Animalia
- Phylum: Arthropoda
- Clade: Pancrustacea
- Class: Insecta
- Order: Lepidoptera
- Family: Depressariidae
- Genus: Agonopterix
- Species: A. pergandeella

Binomial name
- Agonopterix pergandeella (Busck, 1908)

Synonyms
- Depressaria pergandeella Busck, 1908

Species of moth

Agonopterix pergandeella is a moth in the family Depressariidae. It was described by August Busck in 1908. It is found in North America, where it has been recorded from Minnesota and Nebraska.

The wingspan is about 21 mm. The forewings are light brown, irrorated (speckled) with poorly defined blackish-fuscous spots and with a series of similarly colored spots around the termen. There are two black discal spots at the basal third in the cell and another similar spot at the end of the cell, preceded by an ill-defined blackish-fuscous cloud. The base of the costa is fuscous and there is a well-defined black spot in the inner angle. The hindwings are shining light yellowish fuscous.
