= Agonopterix glabrella =

Scientific classification
- Kingdom: Animalia
- Phylum: Arthropoda
- Clade: Pancrustacea
- Class: Insecta
- Order: Lepidoptera
- Family: Depressariidae
- Genus: Agonopterix
- Species: A. glabrella

Binomial name
- Agonopterix glabrella (Turati, 1921)

Synonyms
- Depressaria glabrella Turati, 1921

Species of moth

Agonopterix glabrella is a moth in the family Depressariidae. It was described by Turati in 1921. It is found in Morocco.
