= Agonopterix burmana =

Scientific classification
- Kingdom: Animalia
- Phylum: Arthropoda
- Clade: Pancrustacea
- Class: Insecta
- Order: Lepidoptera
- Family: Depressariidae
- Genus: Agonopterix
- Species: A. burmana

Binomial name
- Agonopterix burmana Lvovsky, 1998

Synonyms
- Agonopterix costaemaculella burmana Lvovsky, 1998

Species of moth

Agonopterix burmana is a moth in the family Depressariidae. It was described by Alexandr L. Lvovsky in 1998. It is found in north-eastern Myanmar and Shaanxi, China.
