= Agonopterix mendesi =

Scientific classification
- Kingdom: Animalia
- Phylum: Arthropoda
- Clade: Pancrustacea
- Class: Insecta
- Order: Lepidoptera
- Family: Depressariidae
- Genus: Agonopterix
- Species: A. mendesi

Binomial name
- Agonopterix mendesi Corley, 2002

Species of moth

Agonopterix mendesi is a moth of the family Depressariidae which is endemic to Portugal.

The larvae feed on Centaurea sphaerocephala.
