= Agonopterix archangelicella =

Scientific classification
- Kingdom: Animalia
- Phylum: Arthropoda
- Clade: Pancrustacea
- Class: Insecta
- Order: Lepidoptera
- Family: Depressariidae
- Genus: Agonopterix
- Species: A. archangelicella

Binomial name
- Agonopterix archangelicella (Caradja, 1920)

Synonyms
- Depressaria archangelicella Caradja, 1920

Species of moth

Agonopterix archangelicella is a moth in the family Depressariidae. It was described by Aristide Caradja in 1920. It is found in south-eastern Siberia.
