= Agonopterix socerbi =

Scientific classification
- Kingdom: Animalia
- Phylum: Arthropoda
- Clade: Pancrustacea
- Class: Insecta
- Order: Lepidoptera
- Family: Depressariidae
- Genus: Agonopterix
- Species: A. socerbi

Binomial name
- Agonopterix socerbi Šumpich, 2012

Species of moth

Agonopterix socerbi is a moth of the family Depressariidae. It is found in south-western Slovenia. The habitat consists of open grassy steppes.

The wingspan is 15–17 mm.
