= Agonopterix liesella =

Scientific classification
- Kingdom: Animalia
- Phylum: Arthropoda
- Clade: Pancrustacea
- Class: Insecta
- Order: Lepidoptera
- Family: Depressariidae
- Genus: Agonopterix
- Species: A. liesella

Binomial name
- Agonopterix liesella Viette, 1987

Species of moth

Agonopterix liesella is a moth in the family Depressariidae. It was described by Viette in 1987. It is found in Madagascar.
