= Agonopterix l-nigrum =

Scientific classification
- Kingdom: Animalia
- Phylum: Arthropoda
- Clade: Pancrustacea
- Class: Insecta
- Order: Lepidoptera
- Family: Depressariidae
- Genus: Agonopterix
- Species: A. l-nigrum

Binomial name
- Agonopterix l-nigrum (Matsumura, 1931)

Synonyms
- Depressaria l-nigrum Matsumura, 1931

Species of moth

Agonopterix l-nigrum is a moth in the family Depressariidae. It was described by Shōnen Matsumura in 1931. It is found on the Japanese island of Hokkaido and the Amur and Primorsky regions of the Russian Far East.
