= Agonopterix lacteella =

Scientific classification
- Kingdom: Animalia
- Phylum: Arthropoda
- Clade: Pancrustacea
- Class: Insecta
- Order: Lepidoptera
- Family: Depressariidae
- Genus: Agonopterix
- Species: A. lacteella

Binomial name
- Agonopterix lacteella (Caradja, 1920)

Synonyms
- Depressaria lacteella Caradja, 1920

Species of moth

Agonopterix lacteella is a moth in the family Depressariidae. It was described by Aristide Caradja in 1920. It is found in the Russian Far East (south-eastern Siberia).
