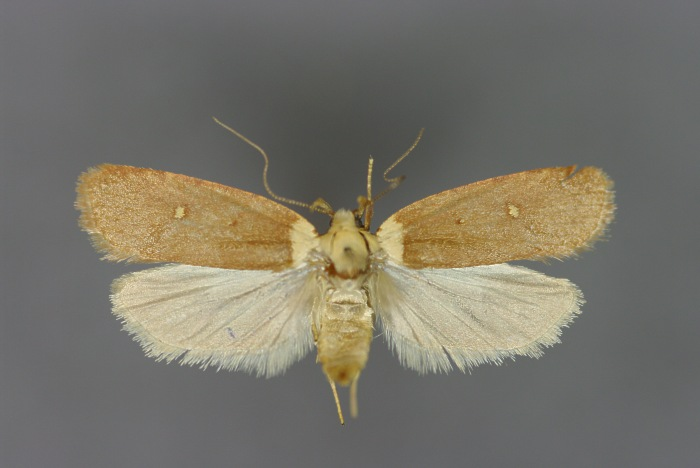
- Agonopterix furvella

Scientific classification
- Kingdom: Animalia
- Phylum: Arthropoda
- Clade: Pancrustacea
- Class: Insecta
- Order: Lepidoptera
- Family: Depressariidae
- Subfamily: Depressariinae
- Genus: Agonopterix; Hübner, 1825

Type species
- "Tinea signella" Hübner, 1796

Synonyms
- Epeleustia Hübner, 1825; Pinaris Hübner, 1825; Tichonia Hübner, 1825; Haemylis Treitschke, 1832; Syllochitis Meyrick, 1910; Ctenioxena Meyrick, 1923; Agonopteryx; Subagonopterix Lvovsky, 2013

= Agonopterix =

Genus of moths

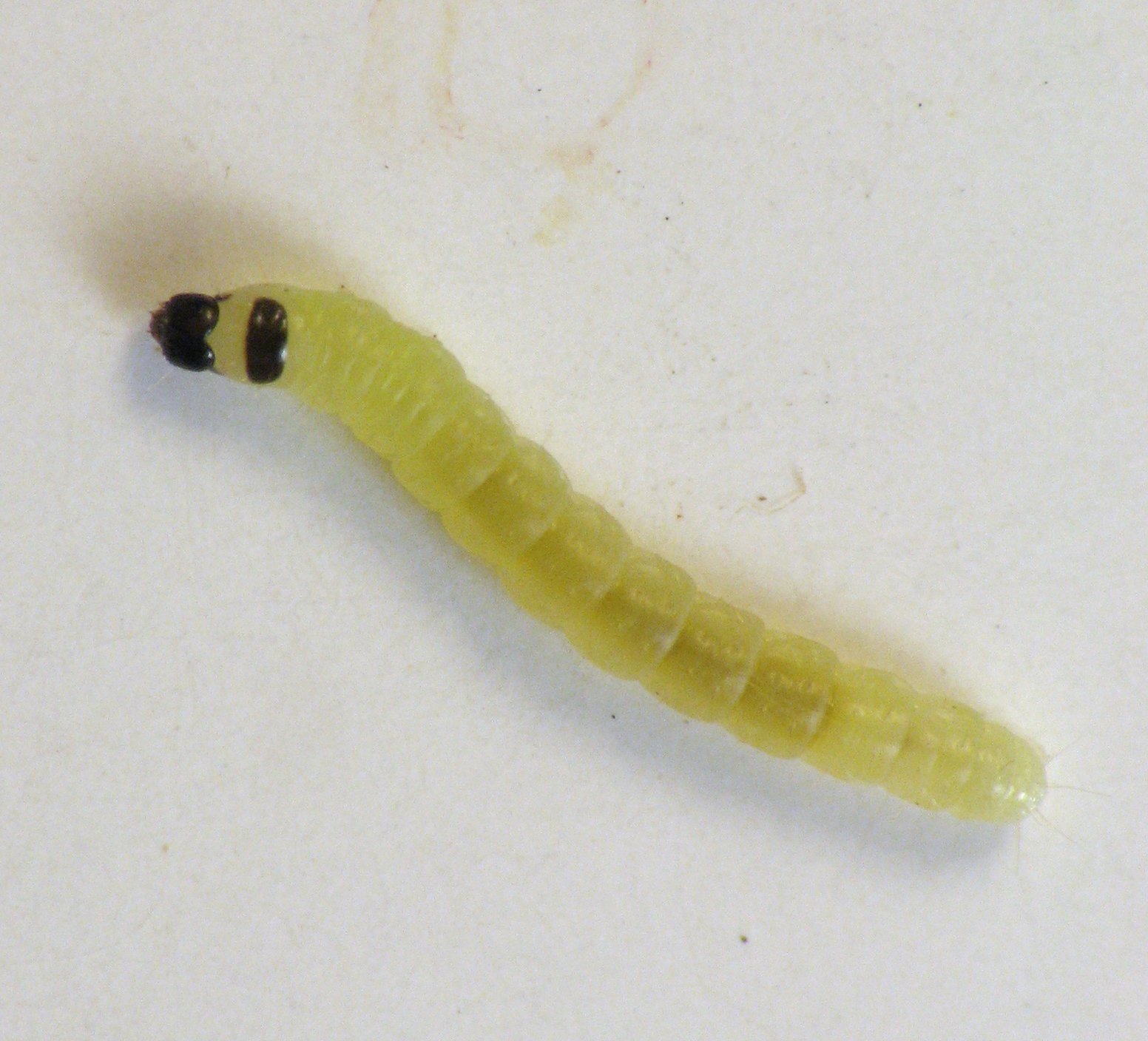
A. senicionella caterpillar

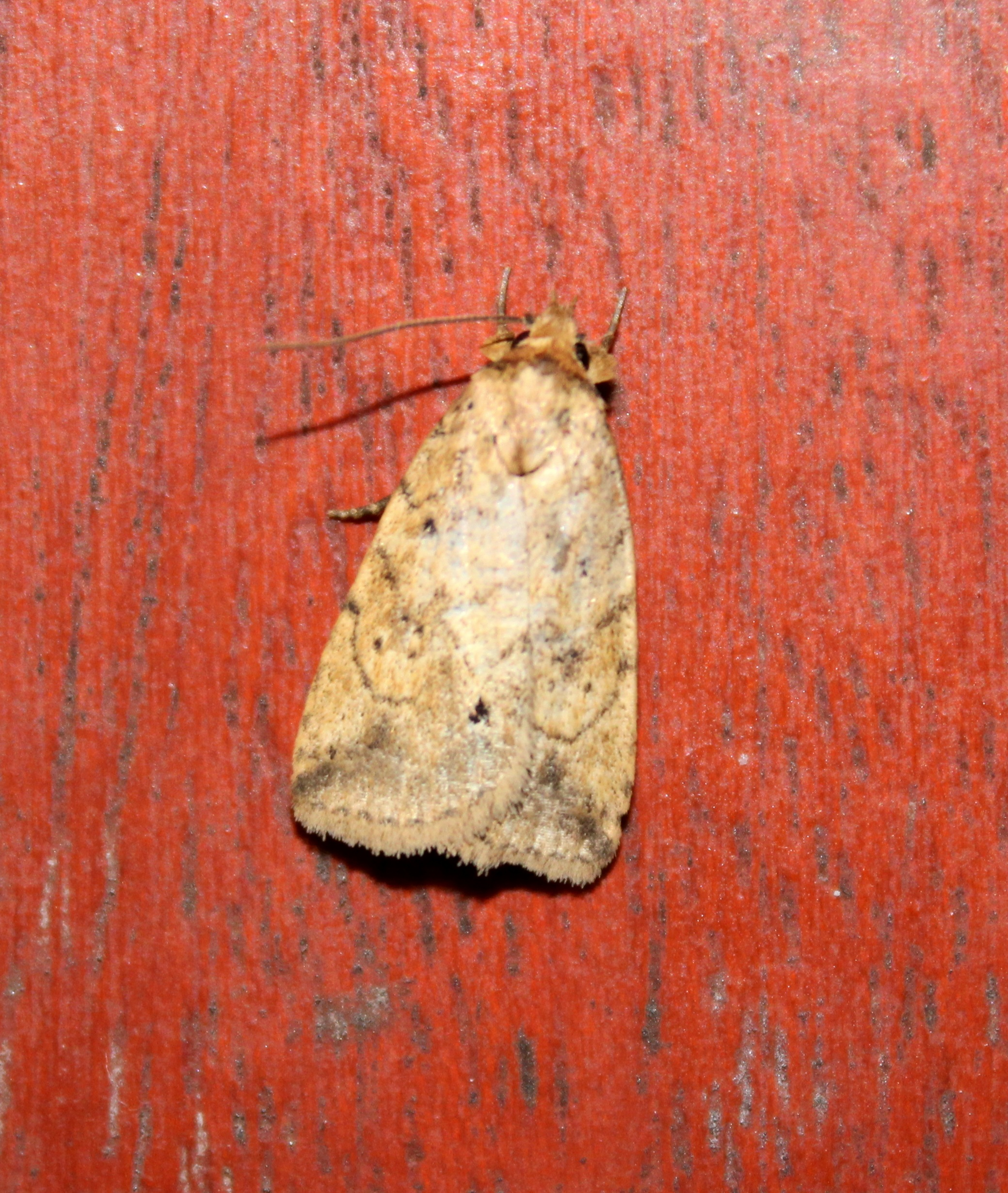
in Sri Lanka

Agonopterix is a moth genus of the superfamily Gelechioidea. It is placed in the family Depressariidae, which was often – particularly in older treatments – considered a subfamily of the Oecophoridae or included in the Elachistidae.

== Species ==
- Agonopterix abditella Hannemann, 1959
- Agonopterix abjectella Christoph, 1882
- Agonopterix acuta (Stringer, 1930)
- Agonopterix acutivalvula S.X. Wang, 2007
- Agonopterix adspersella (Kollar, 1832)
- Agonopterix agyrella (Rebel, 1917)
- Agonopterix alpigena (Frey, 1870)
- Agonopterix alstromeriana (Clerck, 1759) – poison hemlock moth
- Agonopterix amissella (Busck, 1908)
- Agonopterix amyrisella (Busck, 1900)
- Agonopterix angelicella (Hubner, 1813)
- Agonopterix antennariella Clarke, 1941
- Agonopterix anticella (Erschoff, [1877])
- Agonopterix aperta Hannemann, 1959
- Agonopterix archangelicella (Caradja, 1920)
- Agonopterix arctica (Strand, 1902)
- Agonopterix arenella (Denis & Schiffermuller, 1775)
- Agonopterix argillacea (Walsingham, 1881)
- Agonopterix arnicella (Walsingham, 1881)
- Agonopterix aspersella (Constant, 1888)
- Agonopterix assimilella (Treitschke, 1832)
- Agonopterix astrantiae (Heinemann, 1870)
- Agonopterix atomella (Denis & Schiffermuller, 1775)
- Agonopterix atrodorsella (Clemens, 1863)
- Agonopterix babaella Amsel, 1972
- Agonopterix bakriella (Amsel, 1958)
- Agonopterix baleni (Zeller, 1877)
- Agonopterix banatica Georgesco, 1965
- Agonopterix bipunctifera (Matsumura, 1931)
- Agonopterix bipunctosa (Curtis, 1850)
- Agonopterix broennoeensis (Strand, 1920)
- Agonopterix budashkini Lvovsky, 1998
- Agonopterix burmana (Lvovsky, 1998)
- Agonopterix cachritis (Staudinger, 1859)
- Agonopterix cadurciella (Chretien, 1914)
- Agonopterix cajonensis Clarke, 1941
- Agonopterix canadensis (Busck, 1902) – Canadian agonopterix moth
- Agonopterix canuflavella (Hannemann, 1953)
- Agonopterix capreolella (Zeller, 1839)
- Agonopterix carduella (Hubner, 1817)
- Agonopterix caucasiella Karsholt et al., 2006
- Agonopterix cervariella (Constant, 1884)
- Agonopterix chaetosoma Clarke, 1962
- Agonopterix chironiella (Constant, 1893)
- Agonopterix chrautis Hodges, 1974
- Agonopterix ciliella (Stainton, 1849)
- Agonopterix cinerariae Walsingham, 1908
- Agonopterix clarkei Keifer, 1936
- Agonopterix clemensella (Chambers, 1876)
- Agonopterix cluniana Huemer & Lvovsky, 2000
- Agonopterix cnicella (Treitschke, 1832)
- Agonopterix coenosella Zerny, 1940
- Agonopterix comitella (Lederer, 1855)
- Agonopterix communis (Meyrick, 1920)
- Agonopterix compacta (Meyrick, 1914)
- Agonopterix conterminella (Zeller, 1839)
- Agonopterix costaemaculella (Christoph, 1882)
- Agonopterix costimacula Clarke, 1941
- Agonopterix crassiventrella (Rebel, 1891)
- Agonopterix cratia Hodges, 1974
- Agonopterix crypsicosma (Meyrick, 1920)
- Agonopterix cuillerella Amsel, 1972
- Agonopterix curvilineella (Beutenmüller, 1889) – curved-line agonopterix moth
- Agonopterix curvipunctosa (Haworth, 1811)
- Agonopterix cyclas (Meyrick, 1910)
- Agonopterix cynarivora Meyrick, 1932
- Agonopterix cyrniella (Rebel, 1929)
- Agonopterix dammersi Clarke, 1947
- Agonopterix demissella (Hannemann, 1958)
- Agonopterix deliciosella Turati, 1924
- Agonopterix deltopa (Meyrick, 1935)
- Agonopterix dideganella Amsel, 1972
- Agonopterix dierli Lvovsky, 2011
- Agonopterix dilatata S.X. Wang, 2007
- Agonopterix dimorphella Clarke, 1941
- Agonopterix divergella (Caradja, 1920)
- Agonopterix doronicella (Wocke, 1849)
- Agonopterix dryocrates (Meyrick, 1921)
- Agonopterix dubatolovi Lvovsky, 1995
- Agonopterix dumitrescui Georgesco, 1965
- Agonopterix echinopella (Chrétien, 1907)
- Agonopterix elbursella Hannemann, 1976
- Agonopterix encentra (Meyrick, 1914)
- Agonopterix epichersa (Meyrick, 1914)
- Agonopterix erythrella (Snellen, 1884)
- Agonopterix eupatoriiella (Chambers, 1878)
- Agonopterix exquisitella (Caradja, 1920)
- Agonopterix farsensis Hannemann, 1958
- Agonopterix ferocella (Chretien, 1910)
- Agonopterix ferulae (Zeller, 1847)
- Agonopterix flavicomella (Engel, 1907)
- Agonopterix flurii Sonderegger, 2013
- Agonopterix fruticosella (Walsingham, 1903)
- Agonopterix furvella (Treitschke, 1832)
- Agonopterix fusciterminella Clarke, 1941
- Agonopterix fuscovenella (Rebel, 1917)
- Agonopterix galbella Hannemann, 1959
- Agonopterix gelidella (Busck, 1908)
- Agonopterix glabrella (Turati, 1921)
- Agonopterix glyphidopa (Meyrick, 1828)
- Agonopterix goughi (Bradley, 1958)
- Agonopterix graecella Hannemann, 1976
- Agonopterix grammatopa (Meyrick, 1920)
- Agonopterix hamriella (Chrétien, 1922)
- Agonopterix heracliana (Linnaeus, 1758)
- Agonopterix hesphoea Hodges, 1975
- Agonopterix hippomarathri (Nickerl, 1864)
- Agonopterix hoenei Lvovsky & S.X. Wang, 2011
- Agonopterix homogenes (Meyrick, 1920)
- Agonopterix hyperella Ely, 1910
- Agonopterix hypericella (Hubner, 1817)
- Agonopterix iharai Fujisawa, 1985
- Agonopterix iliensis (Rebel, 1936)
- Agonopterix inoxiella Hannemann, 1959
- Agonopterix intersecta (Filipjev, 1929)
- Agonopterix invenustella (Hannemann, 1953)
- Agonopterix irrorata (Staudinger, 1870)
- Agonopterix issikii Clarke, 1962
- Agonopterix japonica Saito, 1980
- Agonopterix jezonica (Matsumura, 1931)
- Agonopterix kaekeritziana (Linnaeus, 1767)
- Agonopterix kisojiana Fujisawa, 1985
- Agonopterix kuznetzovi Lvovsky, 1983
- Agonopterix lacteella (Caradja, 1920)
- Agonopterix laterella (Denis & Schiffermuller, 1775)
- Agonopterix latipalpella Barnes & Busck, 1920
- Agonopterix latipennella Zerny, 1934
- Agonopterix lecontella (Clemens, 1860)
- Agonopterix leptopa (Diakonoff, 1952)
- Agonopterix leucadensis (Rebel, 1932)
- Agonopterix liesella Viette, 1987
- Agonopterix ligusticella (Chretien, 1908)
- Agonopterix likiangella Lvovsky & S.X. Wang, 2011
- Agonopterix liturosa (Haworth, 1811)
- Agonopterix l-nigrum (Matsumura, 1931)
- Agonopterix lythrella (Walsingham, 1889)
- Agonopterix malaisei (Diakonoff, 1952)
- Agonopterix melanarcha (Meyrick, 1913)
- Agonopterix melancholica (Rebel, 1917)
- Agonopterix mendesi Corley, 2002
- Agonopterix metamelopa Meyrick, 1931
- Agonopterix mikkolai Lvovsky, 2011
- Agonopterix mikomoensis Fujisawa, 1985
- Agonopterix miyanella Amsel, 1972
- Agonopterix monotona Caradja, 1927
- Agonopterix multiplicella (Erschoff, 1877)
- Agonopterix muricolorella (Busck, 1902)
- Agonopterix mutatella Hannemann, 1989
- Agonopterix mutuurai Saito, 1980
- Agonopterix nanatella (Stainton, 1849)
- Agonopterix nebulosa (Zeller, 1873)
- Agonopterix neoxesta (Meyrick, 1918)
- Agonopterix nervosa (Haworth, 1811) – gorse tip moth
- Agonopterix nigrinotella (Busck, 1908)
- Agonopterix nodiflorella (Milliere, 1866)
- Agonopterix nubiferella (Walsingham, 1881)
- Agonopterix nyctalopis (Meyrick, 1930)
- Agonopterix occaecata (Meyrick, 1922)
- Agonopterix ocellana (Fabricius, 1775)
- Agonopterix ochrocephala Saito, 1980
- Agonopterix oinochroa (Turati, 1879)
- Agonopterix omelkoi Lvovsky, 1985
- Agonopterix ordubadensis Hannemann, 1959
- Agonopterix oregonensis Clarke, 1941
- Agonopterix orientalis S.X. Wang, 2007
- Agonopterix pallidior (Stringer, 1930)
- Agonopterix pallorella (Zeller, 1839)
- Agonopterix panjaoella Amsel, 1972
- Agonopterix parilella (Treitschke, 1835)
- Agonopterix parinkini Lvovsky, 2011
- Agonopterix paulae Harrison, 2005
- Agonopterix pavida (Meyrick, 1913)
- Agonopterix perezi Walsingham, 1908
- Agonopterix pergandeella (Busck, 1908)
- Agonopterix perstrigella (Chretien, 1925)
- Agonopterix petasitis (Standfuss, 1851)
- Agonopterix petraea (Meyrick, 1910)
- Agonopterix phaeocausta (Meyrick, 1934)
- Agonopterix posticella (Walsingham, 1881)
- Agonopterix probella (Hannemann, 1953)
- Agonopterix propinquella (Treitschke, 1835)
- Agonopterix pseudorutana Turati, 1934
- Agonopterix psoraliella (Walsingham, 1881)
- Agonopterix pteleae Barnes & Busck, 1920
- Agonopterix pullella Hannemann, 1971
- Agonopterix pulvipennella (Clemens, 1864)
- Agonopterix pupillana (Wocke, 1887)
- Agonopterix purpurea (Haworth, 1811)
- Agonopterix putridella (Denis & Schiffermuller, 1775)
- Agonopterix quadripunctata (Wocke, 1857)
- Agonopterix ramosella Stainton, 1867
- Agonopterix remota (Meyrick, 1921)
- Agonopterix rhododrosa (Meyrick, 1934)
- Agonopterix rhodogastra Meyrick, 1935
- Agonopterix rimulella Caradja, 1920
- Agonopterix robiniella (Packard, 1869) – four-dotted agonopterix moth
- Agonopterix rosaciliella (Busck, 1904)
- Agonopterix roseocaudella Stringer, 1930
- Agonopterix rotundella (Douglas, 1846)
- Agonopterix rubristricta (Walsingham, 1912)
- Agonopterix rubrovittella Caradja, 1926
- Agonopterix rutana (Fabricius, 1794)
- Agonopterix sabulella (Walsingham, 1881)
- Agonopterix salangella Amsel, 1972
- Agonopterix sanguinella (Busck, 1902)
- Agonopterix sapporensis (Matsumura, 1931)
- Agonopterix scopariella (Heinemann, 1870)
- Agonopterix selini (Heinemann, 1870)
- Agonopterix senecionis (Nickerl, 1864)
- Agonopterix seneciovora Fujisawa, 1985
- Agonopterix senicionella (Busck, 1902)
- Agonopterix septicella Snellen, 1884
- Agonopterix seraphimella (Lhomme, 1929)
- Agonopterix silerella (Stainton, 1865)
- Agonopterix socerbi Šumpich, 2012
- Agonopterix squamosa (Mann, 1864)
- Agonopterix stigmella (Moore, 1878)
- Agonopterix straminella (Staudinger, 1859)
- Agonopterix subpropinquella (Stainton, 1849)
- Agonopterix subumbellana Hannemann, 1959
- Agonopterix sumizome Fujisawa, 1985
- Agonopterix sutschanella Caradja, 1926
- Agonopterix tabghaella Amsel, 1953
- Agonopterix taciturna (Meyrick, 1910)
- Agonopterix takamukui (Matsumura, 1931)
- Agonopterix thaiensis Hannemann, 1986
- Agonopterix thapsiella (Zeller, 1847)
- Agonopterix thelmae Clarke, 1941 – Thelma's agonopterix moth
- Agonopterix thurneri (Rebel, 1941)
- Agonopterix tibetana S.X. Wang, 2007
- Agonopterix toega Hodges, 1974
- Agonopterix tolli Hannemann, 1959
- Agonopterix triallactis Meyrick, 1935
- Agonopterix trimenella (Walsingham, 1881)
- Agonopterix tschorbadjiewi (Rebel, 1916)
- Agonopterix umbellana (Fabricius, 1794)
- Agonopterix vasta Amsel, 1935
- Agonopterix vendettella (Chretien, 1908)
- Agonopterix ventrangulata Lvovsky & S.X. Wang, 2011
- Agonopterix vietnamella Lvovsky, 2013
- Agonopterix walsinghamella (Busck, 1902) – Walsingham's agonopterix moth
- Agonopterix xylinopis Caradja, 1931
- Agonopterix yamatoensis Fujisawa, 1985
- Agonopterix yeatiana (Fabricius, 1781)
- Agonopterix yomogiella Saito, 1980

== Former species ==
- Agonopterix acerbella (Walker, 1864)
