= Agonopterix cadurciella =

Scientific classification
- Kingdom: Animalia
- Phylum: Arthropoda
- Clade: Pancrustacea
- Class: Insecta
- Order: Lepidoptera
- Family: Depressariidae
- Genus: Agonopterix
- Species: A. cadurciella

Binomial name
- Agonopterix cadurciella (Chretien, 1914)

Synonyms
- Depressaria cadurciella Chretien, 1914

Species of moth

Agonopterix cadurciella is a moth of the family Depressariidae. It is found in France.

The wingspan is 22–23 mm.
