= Agonopterix deltopa =

Scientific classification
- Kingdom: Animalia
- Phylum: Arthropoda
- Clade: Pancrustacea
- Class: Insecta
- Order: Lepidoptera
- Family: Depressariidae
- Genus: Agonopterix
- Species: A. deltopa

Binomial name
- Agonopterix deltopa (Meyrick & Caradja, 1935)

Synonyms
- Depressaria deltopa Meyrick & Caradja, 1935

Species of moth

Agonopterix deltopa is a moth in the family Depressariidae. It was described by Edward Meyrick and Aristide Caradja in 1935. It is found in China and Japan.
