= Agonopterix acuta =

Scientific classification
- Kingdom: Animalia
- Phylum: Arthropoda
- Clade: Pancrustacea
- Class: Insecta
- Order: Lepidoptera
- Family: Depressariidae
- Genus: Agonopterix
- Species: A. acuta

Binomial name
- Agonopterix acuta Stringer, 1930

Species of moth

Agonopterix acuta is a moth in the family Depressariidae. It was described by Stringer in 1930. It is found in Japan.
