= Agonopterix cyclas =

Scientific classification
- Kingdom: Animalia
- Phylum: Arthropoda
- Clade: Pancrustacea
- Class: Insecta
- Order: Lepidoptera
- Family: Depressariidae
- Genus: Agonopterix
- Species: A. cyclas

Binomial name
- Agonopterix cyclas (Meyrick, 1910)

Synonyms
- Depressaria cyclas Meyrick, 1910

Species of moth

Agonopterix cyclas is a moth in the family Depressariidae. It was described by Edward Meyrick in 1910. It is found in Kashmir.

The wingspan is 19–20 mm. The forewings are pale brownish fuscous with irregularly scattered small dots and strigulae of black scales. There is an oblique black subdorsal dash at the base. The costa is irregularly spotted with blackish throughout. The hindwings are light grey, but paler towards the base with three or four blackish-grey marks on the upper part of the termen.
