= Agonopterix galbella =

Scientific classification
- Kingdom: Animalia
- Phylum: Arthropoda
- Clade: Pancrustacea
- Class: Insecta
- Order: Lepidoptera
- Family: Depressariidae
- Genus: Agonopterix
- Species: A. galbella

Binomial name
- Agonopterix galbella Hannemann, 1959

Species of moth

Agonopterix galbella is a moth in the family Depressariidae. It was described by Hans-Joachim Hannemann in 1959. It is found in Northeast China.
