= Agonopterix amyrisella =

Scientific classification
- Kingdom: Animalia
- Phylum: Arthropoda
- Clade: Pancrustacea
- Class: Insecta
- Order: Lepidoptera
- Family: Depressariidae
- Genus: Agonopterix
- Species: A. amyrisella

Binomial name
- Agonopterix amyrisella (Busck, 1900)

Synonyms
- Depressaria amyrisella Busck, 1900; Depressaria amyridella Meyrick, 1922

Species of moth

Agonopterix amyrisella is a moth in the family Depressariidae. It was described by August Busck in 1900. It is found in North America, where it has been recorded from Florida.

The wingspan is 16–17 mm. The forewings are dark violaceous brown with sparse black scales. The extreme dorsal base is purplish black, with a collection of purplish black scales at the basal third. There is a small round white dot at the end of the cell, which is black margined at both sides. The costal and apical edge are lighter brown, with five costal and six to eight smaller apical dots. The hindwings are light shining yellowish brown, with a blackish edge.

The larvae feed on Amyris floridana. They live in a folded young leaf, with a round hole at the petiole, lined with silk. The larvae have a yellowish body and black head. Pupation takes place within the leaf fold.
