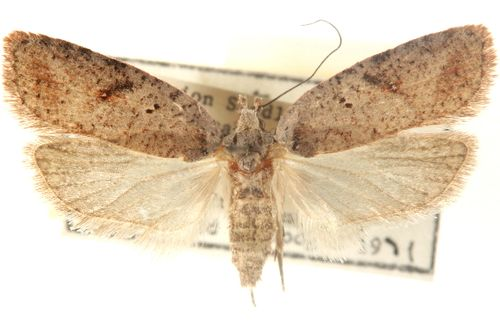

Scientific classification
- Kingdom: Animalia
- Phylum: Arthropoda
- Clade: Pancrustacea
- Class: Insecta
- Order: Lepidoptera
- Family: Depressariidae
- Genus: Agonopterix
- Species: A. sanguinella

Binomial name
- Agonopterix sanguinella (Busck, 1902)

Synonyms
- Depressaria sanguinella Busck, 1902

= Agonopterix sanguinella =

Species of moth

Agonopterix sanguinella is a moth in the family Depressariidae. It was described by August Busck in 1902. It is found in North America, where it has been recorded from Arizona, New Mexico and Nevada.

The wingspan is about 21 mm. The forewings are grey, irrorated (sprinkled) with black and with a carmine tinge, this carmine color is more pronounced along the costa and apex. The base of the wing and costa are pale grayish ochrous, the former followed by and the latter narrowly edged with black. There are two black discal spots edged with a few carmine scales at the basal third and a white discal spot edged with carmine at the end of the cell. There is also a blackish dash from the discal spot at the end of the cell. The hindwings are light ochrous fuscous.

The larvae feed on Robinia neoxmexicana.
