= Agonopterix sutschanella =

Scientific classification
- Kingdom: Animalia
- Phylum: Arthropoda
- Clade: Pancrustacea
- Class: Insecta
- Order: Lepidoptera
- Family: Depressariidae
- Genus: Agonopterix
- Species: A. sutschanella

Binomial name
- Agonopterix sutschanella (Caradja, 1926)

Synonyms
- Depressaria sutschanella Caradja, 1926

Species of moth

Agonopterix sutschanella is a moth in the family Depressariidae. It was described by Aristide Caradja in 1926. It is found in south-eastern Siberia.
