= Agonopterix pseudorutana =

Scientific classification
- Kingdom: Animalia
- Phylum: Arthropoda
- Clade: Pancrustacea
- Class: Insecta
- Order: Lepidoptera
- Family: Depressariidae
- Genus: Agonopterix
- Species: A. pseudorutana

Binomial name
- Agonopterix pseudorutana (Turati, 1934)

Synonyms
- Depressaria pseudorutana Turati, 1934

Species of moth

Agonopterix pseudorutana is a moth in the family Depressariidae. It was first described by Turati in 1934. It is found in Libya.
