= Agonopterix homogenes =

Scientific classification
- Kingdom: Animalia
- Phylum: Arthropoda
- Clade: Pancrustacea
- Class: Insecta
- Order: Lepidoptera
- Family: Depressariidae
- Genus: Agonopterix
- Species: A. homogenes

Binomial name
- Agonopterix homogenes (Meyrick, 1920)

Synonyms
- Depressaria homogenes Meyrick, 1920

Species of moth

Agonopterix homogenes is a moth in the family Depressariidae. It was described by Edward Meyrick in 1920. It is found in South Africa.

The wingspan is about 18 mm. The forewings are greyish ochreous, the costa irregularly strigulated with blackish irroration (sprinkles). There is a small blackish mark above the dorsum near the base, posteriorly suffused with grey. The hindwings are light grey, darker posteriorly.
