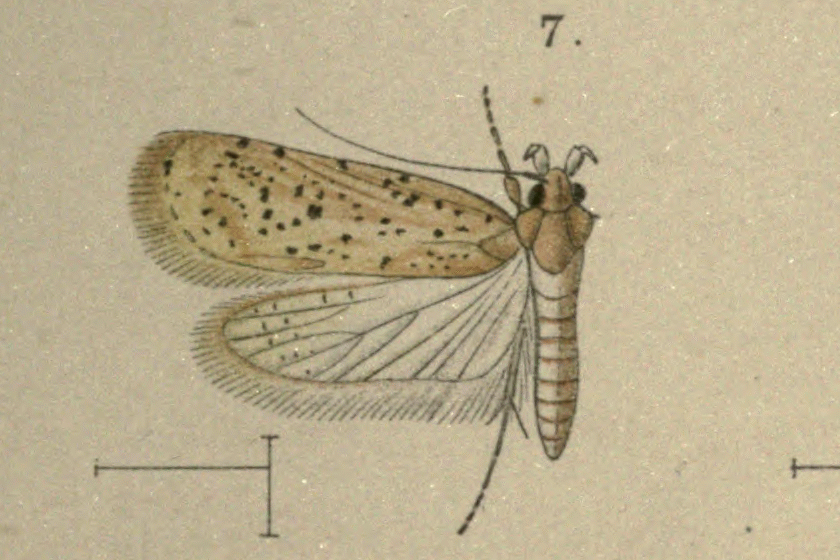

Scientific classification
- Kingdom: Animalia
- Phylum: Arthropoda
- Clade: Pancrustacea
- Class: Insecta
- Order: Lepidoptera
- Family: Depressariidae
- Genus: Agonopterix
- Species: A. cinerariae

Binomial name
- Agonopterix cinerariae Walsingham, 1908

= Agonopterix cinerariae =

Species of moth

Agonopterix cinerariae is a moth of the family Depressariidae. It is found on the Canary Islands.

The wingspan is 17–20 mm. The forewings are pale ochreous with a few darker fawn-ochreous shades and scattered with black dots. The hindwings are very pale, shining whitish ochreous.

The larvae feed on Senecio halimifolius and Senecio heritieri. They mine the leaves of their host plant. Mining takes place the upper and under surface of the leaves, causing a slightly puckered appearance. Larvae can be found from April to May.
