= Agonopterix arnicella =

Scientific classification
- Kingdom: Animalia
- Phylum: Arthropoda
- Clade: Pancrustacea
- Class: Insecta
- Order: Lepidoptera
- Family: Depressariidae
- Genus: Agonopterix
- Species: A. arnicella

Binomial name
- Agonopterix arnicella (Walsingham, 1881)

Synonyms
- Depressaria arnicella Walsingham, 1881

Species of moth

Agonopterix arnicella is a moth in the family Depressariidae. It was described by Thomas de Grey, 6th Baron Walsingham, in 1881. It is found in North America, where it has been recorded from Alberta, Ontario, Washington, Oregon and California.

The wingspan is about 22 mm. The forewings are pale ochreous, suffused and blotched with greyish fuscous. There are three fuscous discal dots, with a slight greyish fuscous cloud between them. There is an ill-defined pale basal patch and the costal and apical margins are diffusely dotted with greyish fuscous. The hindwings are shining grey. Adults are on wing from June to September.

The larvae feed on Erigeron species, as well as Arnica angustifolia.
