= Agonopterix thurneri =

Scientific classification
- Kingdom: Animalia
- Phylum: Arthropoda
- Clade: Pancrustacea
- Class: Insecta
- Order: Lepidoptera
- Family: Depressariidae
- Genus: Agonopterix
- Species: A. thurneri

Binomial name
- Agonopterix thurneri (Rebel, 1941)

Synonyms
- Depressaria thurneri Rebel, 1941

Species of moth

Agonopterix thurneri is a moth of the family Depressariidae. It is found in North Macedonia.
