= Agonopterix agyrella =

Scientific classification
- Kingdom: Animalia
- Phylum: Arthropoda
- Clade: Pancrustacea
- Class: Insecta
- Order: Lepidoptera
- Family: Depressariidae
- Genus: Agonopterix
- Species: A. agyrella

Binomial name
- Agonopterix agyrella (Rebel, 1917)

Synonyms
- Depressaria agyrella Rebel, 1917

Species of moth

Agonopterix agyrella is a moth in the family Depressariidae. It was described by Hans Rebel in 1917. It is found in Central Asia (Tannuola).
