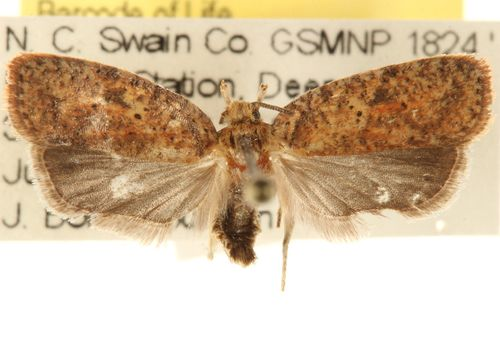

Scientific classification
- Kingdom: Animalia
- Phylum: Arthropoda
- Clade: Pancrustacea
- Class: Insecta
- Order: Lepidoptera
- Family: Depressariidae
- Genus: Agonopterix
- Species: A. dimorphella

Binomial name
- Agonopterix dimorphella J. F. G. Clarke, 1941

= Agonopterix dimorphella =

Species of moth

Agonopterix dimorphella is a moth in the family Depressariidae. It was described by John Frederick Gates Clarke in 1941. It is found in North America, where it has been recorded from South Carolina, Illinois, Nebraska, Kansas and Arkansas.

The wingspan is 11–18 mm. The forewings are reddish-ocherous, suffused with fuscous. There is a fuscous median shade from the costa almost to the inner margin and there is a similar shade before the termen. There are two small black discal spots before the middle of the cell and a yellow discal spot at the end of the cell. The hindwings are blackish fuscous.

The larvae feed on Amorpha fruticosa.
