= Agonopterix costimacula =

Scientific classification
- Kingdom: Animalia
- Phylum: Arthropoda
- Clade: Pancrustacea
- Class: Insecta
- Order: Lepidoptera
- Family: Depressariidae
- Genus: Agonopterix
- Species: A. costimacula

Binomial name
- Agonopterix costimacula J. F. G. Clarke, 1941

Species of moth

Agonopterix costimacula is a moth in the family Depressariidae. It was described by John Frederick Gates Clarke in 1941. The Global Lepidoptera Names Index lists it as a synonym of Agonopterix nigrinotella. It is found in North America, where it has been recorded from Maryland, Michigan, Ohio and Ontario.

The wingspan is 21–25 mm. The forewings are ocherous-fuscous, the base and the costa to about the middle slightly lighter. The light basal area is followed by blackish-fuscous shading. There are two black discal spots at the basal third and a light whitish-ocherous discal spot, narrowly edged with fuscous, at the end of the cell. There are six to eight fuscous spots on the costa, as well as a series of smaller ones at the ends of the veins around the termen. The wing is irrorated (sprinkled) with black scales. The hindwings are light smoky fuscous, but lighter basally.

The larvae feed on Ptelea trifolia.
