= Agonopterix omelkoi =

Scientific classification
- Kingdom: Animalia
- Phylum: Arthropoda
- Clade: Pancrustacea
- Class: Insecta
- Order: Lepidoptera
- Family: Depressariidae
- Genus: Agonopterix
- Species: A. omelkoi

Binomial name
- Agonopterix omelkoi Lvovsky, 1985

Species of moth

Agonopterix omelkoi is a moth in the family Depressariidae. It was described by Alexandr L. Lvovsky in 1985. It is found in the Russian Far East.
