= Agonopterix mutatella =

Scientific classification
- Kingdom: Animalia
- Phylum: Arthropoda
- Clade: Pancrustacea
- Class: Insecta
- Order: Lepidoptera
- Family: Depressariidae
- Genus: Agonopterix
- Species: A. mutatella

Binomial name
- Agonopterix mutatella Hannemann, 1989

Species of moth

Agonopterix mutatella is a moth of the family Depressariidae. It is found on the Canary Islands.
