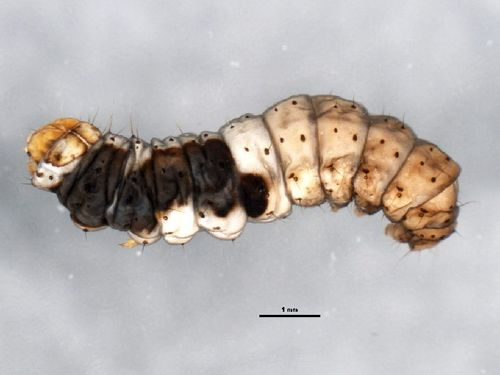

Scientific classification
- Kingdom: Animalia
- Phylum: Arthropoda
- Clade: Pancrustacea
- Class: Insecta
- Order: Lepidoptera
- Family: Depressariidae
- Genus: Agonopterix
- Species: A. gelidella

Binomial name
- Agonopterix gelidella (Busck, 1908)

Synonyms
- Depressaria gelidella Busck, 1908

= Agonopterix gelidella =

Species of moth

Agonopterix gelidella is a moth in the family Depressariidae. It was described by August Busck in 1908. It is found in North America, where it has been recorded from Alberta, Maine, Manitoba and North Carolina.

The wingspan is about 20 mm. The forewings are dark purplish fuscous, sprinkled with black scales. There is a transverse yellowish-white streak near the base from the dorsal edge to near the costa. There is a crescent-shaped black streak on the disc and a small round black dot at the end of the cell, posteriorly edged with white. The costal edge is mottled with black and yellowish white. The hindwings are light yellowish fuscous.

The larvae feed on Salix species and Betula papyrifera.
