= Agonopterix ventrangulata =

Scientific classification
- Kingdom: Animalia
- Phylum: Arthropoda
- Clade: Pancrustacea
- Class: Insecta
- Order: Lepidoptera
- Family: Depressariidae
- Genus: Agonopterix
- Species: A. ventrangulata

Binomial name
- Agonopterix ventrangulata Lvovsky & S.-X. Wang, 2011

Species of moth

Agonopterix ventrangulata is a moth in the family Depressariidae. It was described by Alexandr L. Lvovsky and Shu-Xia Wang in 2011. It is found in Fujian, China.

The wingspan is about 20 millimetres (0.79 in).
