= Agonopterix cluniana =

Scientific classification
- Kingdom: Animalia
- Phylum: Arthropoda
- Clade: Pancrustacea
- Class: Insecta
- Order: Lepidoptera
- Family: Depressariidae
- Genus: Agonopterix
- Species: A. cluniana

Binomial name
- Agonopterix cluniana Huemer & Lvovsky, 2000

Species of moth

Agonopterix cluniana is a moth of the family Depressariidae. It is found in the northern Alps in Austria.

== Etymology ==
It is named for the Roman postal station Clunia in Feldkirch.
