= Agonopterix melanarcha =

Scientific classification
- Kingdom: Animalia
- Phylum: Arthropoda
- Clade: Pancrustacea
- Class: Insecta
- Order: Lepidoptera
- Family: Depressariidae
- Genus: Agonopterix
- Species: A. melanarcha

Binomial name
- Agonopterix melanarcha (Meyrick, 1913)

Synonyms
- Depressaria melanarcha Meyrick, 1913; Martyrhilda melanarcha (Meyrick, 1913)

Species of moth

Agonopterix melanarcha is a moth in the family Depressariidae. It was described by Edward Meyrick in 1913. It is endemic to South Africa.
