= Agonopterix latipennella =

Scientific classification
- Kingdom: Animalia
- Phylum: Arthropoda
- Clade: Pancrustacea
- Class: Insecta
- Order: Lepidoptera
- Family: Depressariidae
- Genus: Agonopterix
- Species: A. latipennella

Binomial name
- Agonopterix latipennella Zerny, 1934

Species of moth

Agonopterix latipennella is a moth in the family Depressariidae. It was described by Zerny in 1934. It is found in Lebanon.
