= Agonopterix crypsicosma =

Scientific classification
- Kingdom: Animalia
- Phylum: Arthropoda
- Clade: Pancrustacea
- Class: Insecta
- Order: Lepidoptera
- Family: Depressariidae
- Genus: Agonopterix
- Species: A. crypsicosma

Binomial name
- Agonopterix crypsicosma (Meyrick, 1920)

Synonyms
- Depressaria crypsicosma Meyrick, 1920

Species of moth

Agonopterix crypsicosma is a moth in the family Depressariidae. It was described by Edward Meyrick in 1920. It is found in South Africa.

The wingspan is about 20 mm (0.79 in). The forewings are pale yellow ochreous with a fuscous costal edge, irrorated (sprinkled) with whitish and slightly thickened posteriorly. It is united with a broad marginal band of fuscous suffusion irrorated with whitish extending towards around the apex and termen and continued more narrowly along the dorsum to before the middle. The hindwings are whitish grey.
