= Agonopterix triallactis =

Scientific classification
- Kingdom: Animalia
- Phylum: Arthropoda
- Clade: Pancrustacea
- Class: Insecta
- Order: Lepidoptera
- Family: Depressariidae
- Genus: Agonopterix
- Species: A. triallactis

Binomial name
- Agonopterix triallactis (Meyrick, 1935)

Synonyms
- Depressaria triallactis Meyrick, 1935

Species of moth

Agonopterix triallactis is a moth in the family Depressariidae. It was described by Edward Meyrick in 1935. It is found in Morocco.
