= Agonopterix metamelopa =

Scientific classification
- Kingdom: Animalia
- Phylum: Arthropoda
- Clade: Pancrustacea
- Class: Insecta
- Order: Lepidoptera
- Family: Depressariidae
- Genus: Agonopterix
- Species: A. metamelopa

Binomial name
- Agonopterix metamelopa Meyrick, 1931

Synonyms
- Depressaria eupatoriiella Chambers, 1878; Agonopteryx plummerella Busck, 1908

Species of moth

Agonopterix metamelopa is a moth in the family Depressariidae. It was described by Edward Meyrick in 1931. It is found in south-eastern Siberia.
