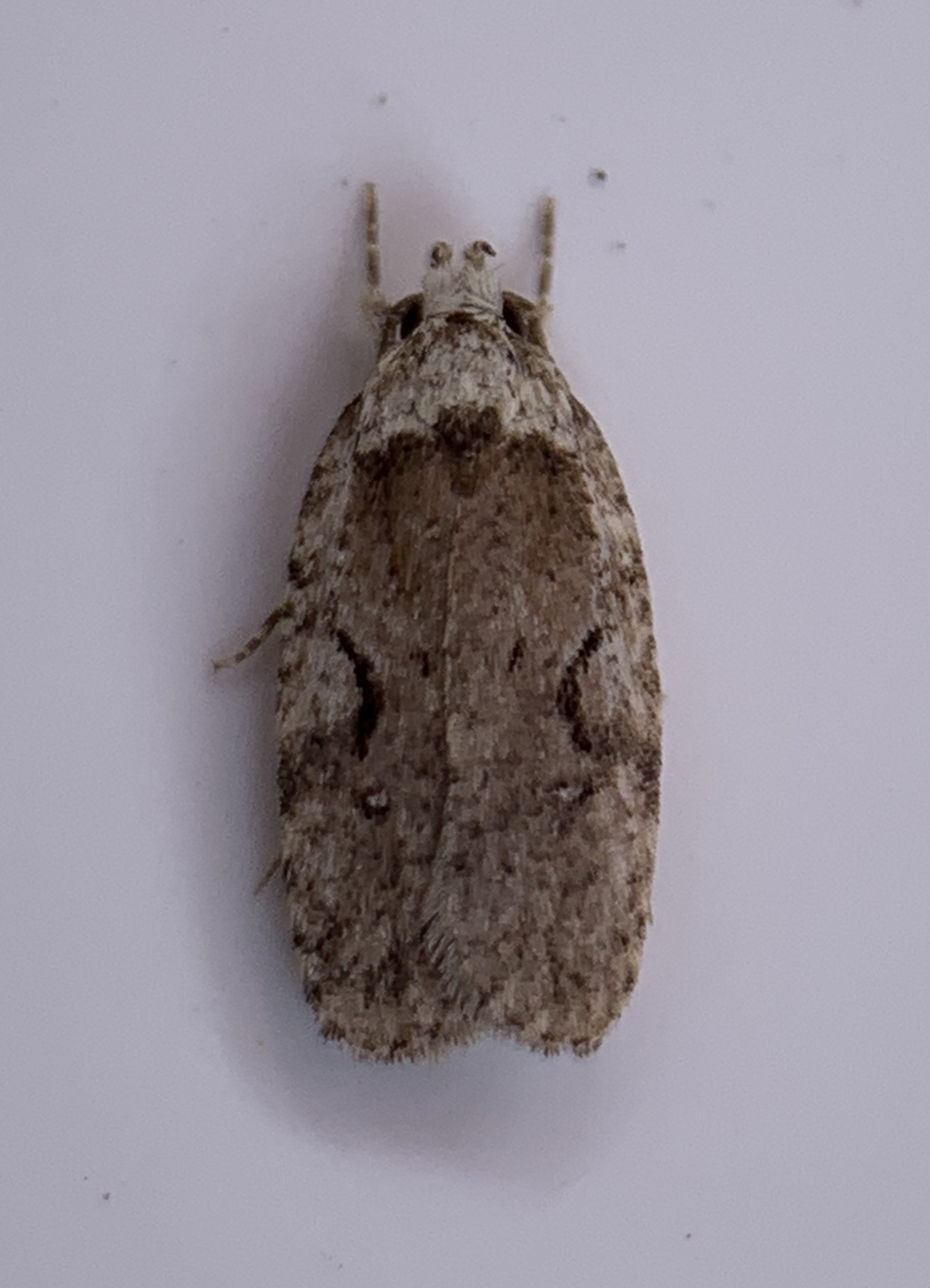

Scientific classification
- Kingdom: Animalia
- Phylum: Arthropoda
- Clade: Pancrustacea
- Class: Insecta
- Order: Lepidoptera
- Family: Depressariidae
- Genus: Agonopterix
- Species: A. curvilineella

Binomial name
- Agonopterix curvilineella (Beutenmüller, 1889)

Synonyms
- Depressaria curvilineella Beutenmüller, 1889

= Agonopterix curvilineella =

Species of moth

Agonopterix curvilineella, the curved-line agonopterix moth, is a species of moth in the family Depressariidae. It was first described by William Beutenmüller in 1889. It is found in North America, where it has been recorded from Illinois, Indiana, Kentucky, Maine, Maryland, Massachusetts, Michigan, Minnesota, Mississippi, New Brunswick, New York, Ohio, Ontario, Quebec, Tennessee, West Virginia and Wisconsin.

The wingspan is about 18 mm. The forewings are gray, clouded with grayish-ochreous scales, especially at the base beyond the pale basal field which extends to the costal third. There is a curved black streak on the disc before the middle, followed by a small white spot edged with black. The costa is sprinkled with fuscous scales. The hindwings are gray fuscous. Adults are on wing from March to December.
