= Agonopterix jezonica =

Scientific classification
- Kingdom: Animalia
- Phylum: Arthropoda
- Clade: Pancrustacea
- Class: Insecta
- Order: Lepidoptera
- Family: Depressariidae
- Genus: Agonopterix
- Species: A. jezonica

Binomial name
- Agonopterix jezonica (Matsumura, 1931)

Synonyms
- Depressaria furvella f. jezonica Matsumura, 1931

Species of moth

Agonopterix jezonica is a moth in the family Depressariidae. It was described by Shōnen Matsumura in 1931. It is found on the Japanese island of Honshu.
