= Agonopterix dierli =

Scientific classification
- Kingdom: Animalia
- Phylum: Arthropoda
- Clade: Pancrustacea
- Class: Insecta
- Order: Lepidoptera
- Family: Depressariidae
- Genus: Agonopterix
- Species: A. dierli

Binomial name
- Agonopterix dierli Lvovsky, 2011

Species of moth

Agonopterix dierli is a moth in the family Depressariidae. It was described by Alexandr L. Lvovsky in 2011. It is found in Nepal.

The wingspan is 20–24 millimetres (0.79–0.94 in).

== Etymology ==
The species is named after the late Dr. Wolfgang Dierl, the collector of the type series.
