= Agonopterix demissella =

Scientific classification
- Kingdom: Animalia
- Phylum: Arthropoda
- Clade: Pancrustacea
- Class: Insecta
- Order: Lepidoptera
- Family: Depressariidae
- Genus: Agonopterix
- Species: A. demissella

Binomial name
- Agonopterix demissella (Hannemann, 1958)

Synonyms
- Agonopteryx demissella Hannemann, 1958

Species of moth

Agonopterix demissella is a moth in the family Depressariidae. It was described by Hans-Joachim Hannemann in 1958. It is found in south-western Iran.
