= Agonopterix rhododrosa =

Scientific classification
- Kingdom: Animalia
- Phylum: Arthropoda
- Clade: Pancrustacea
- Class: Insecta
- Order: Lepidoptera
- Family: Depressariidae
- Genus: Agonopterix
- Species: A. rhododrosa

Binomial name
- Agonopterix rhododrosa (Meyrick, 1934)

Synonyms
- Depressaria rhododrosa Meyrick, 1934

Species of moth

Agonopterix rhododrosa is a moth in the family Depressariidae. It was described by Edward Meyrick in 1934. It is found in Japan.
