= Agonopterix posticella =

Scientific classification
- Kingdom: Animalia
- Phylum: Arthropoda
- Clade: Pancrustacea
- Class: Insecta
- Order: Lepidoptera
- Family: Depressariidae
- Genus: Agonopterix
- Species: A. posticella

Binomial name
- Agonopterix posticella (Walsingham, 1881)

Synonyms
- Depressaria posticella Walsingham, 1881

Species of moth

Agonopterix posticella is a moth in the family Depressariidae. It was described by Thomas de Grey, 6th Baron Walsingham, in 1881. It is found in North America, where it has been recorded from Washington to California and in Wyoming and Colorado.

The wingspan is 17–21 mm. The forewings are dull whitish ochreous, irrorated with black and fuscous and suffused with reddish. There is a blackish-fuscous spot on the costa at the base and on the inner angle near the base. There is also a black discal spot at the basal third, followed by a similar one at the end of the cell, as well as a fuscous blotch on the inner margin, before the tornus. The hindwings are light greyish fuscous.

The larvae feed on Psoralea physodes, Psoralea macrostachya and Psoralea tenuiflora.
