= Agonopterix nyctalopis =

Scientific classification
- Kingdom: Animalia
- Phylum: Arthropoda
- Clade: Pancrustacea
- Class: Insecta
- Order: Lepidoptera
- Family: Depressariidae
- Genus: Agonopterix
- Species: A. nyctalopis

Binomial name
- Agonopterix nyctalopis (Meyrick, 1930)

Synonyms
- Depressaria nyctalopis Meyrick, 1930

Species of moth

Agonopterix nyctalopis is a moth of the family Depressariidae. It is found on the Comoros (Grand Comore).

This species has a wingspan of 23 mm. The head is ochreous-whitish sprinkled light grey, the forewings whitish-ochreous irregularly strigulated brownish.
