= Agonopterix remota =

Scientific classification
- Kingdom: Animalia
- Phylum: Arthropoda
- Clade: Pancrustacea
- Class: Insecta
- Order: Lepidoptera
- Family: Depressariidae
- Genus: Agonopterix
- Species: A. remota

Binomial name
- Agonopterix remota (Meyrick, 1921)

Synonyms
- Depressaria remota Meyrick, 1921

Species of moth

Agonopterix remota is a moth in the family Depressariidae. It was described by Edward Meyrick in 1921. It is found in Palestine.

The wingspan is about 19 mm. The forewings are pale ochreous, distinctly pinkish tinged and with some scattered dark grey scales towards the termen. There are small dark fuscous dots on the base of the costa and towards the dorsum near the base and the discal stigmata is small and blackish with a rather large cloudy dark grey spot beyond and above the first. There are slight indistinct dark grey marginal dots around the apex and termen. The hindwings are pale grey.
