= Agonopterix communis =

Scientific classification
- Kingdom: Animalia
- Phylum: Arthropoda
- Clade: Pancrustacea
- Class: Insecta
- Order: Lepidoptera
- Family: Depressariidae
- Genus: Agonopterix
- Species: A. communis

Binomial name
- Agonopterix communis (Meyrick, 1920)

Synonyms
- Depressaria communis Meyrick, 1920

Species of moth

Agonopterix communis is a moth in the family Depressariidae. It was described by Edward Meyrick in 1920. It is found in South Africa.

The wingspan is 14–15 mm. The forewings are light fuscous, with a pinkish tinge and a black dot towards the costa near the base. The discal stigmata is small and blackish and there is an additional dot before and above the first, as well as a few scattered blackish scales towards the costa between them. A second stigma is sometimes edged anteriorly by a faint whitish dot. There is a marginal series of blackish dots around the posterior part of the costa and termen. The hindwings are grey, but lighter towards the base.
