= Agonopterix tabghaella =

Scientific classification
- Kingdom: Animalia
- Phylum: Arthropoda
- Clade: Pancrustacea
- Class: Insecta
- Order: Lepidoptera
- Family: Depressariidae
- Genus: Agonopterix
- Species: A. tabghaella

Binomial name
- Agonopterix tabghaella (Amsel, 1953)

Synonyms
- Depressaria tabghaella Amsel, 1953

Species of moth

Agonopterix tabghaella is a moth in the family Depressariidae. It was described by Hans Georg Amsel in 1953. It is found in North Africa.
