= Agonopterix erythrella =

Scientific classification
- Kingdom: Animalia
- Phylum: Arthropoda
- Clade: Pancrustacea
- Class: Insecta
- Order: Lepidoptera
- Family: Depressariidae
- Genus: Agonopterix
- Species: A. erythrella

Binomial name
- Agonopterix erythrella (Snellen, 1884)

Synonyms
- Depressaria erythrella Snellen, 1884

Species of moth

Agonopterix erythrella is a moth in the family Depressariidae. It was described by Snellen in 1884. It is found in south-eastern Siberia and Japan.
