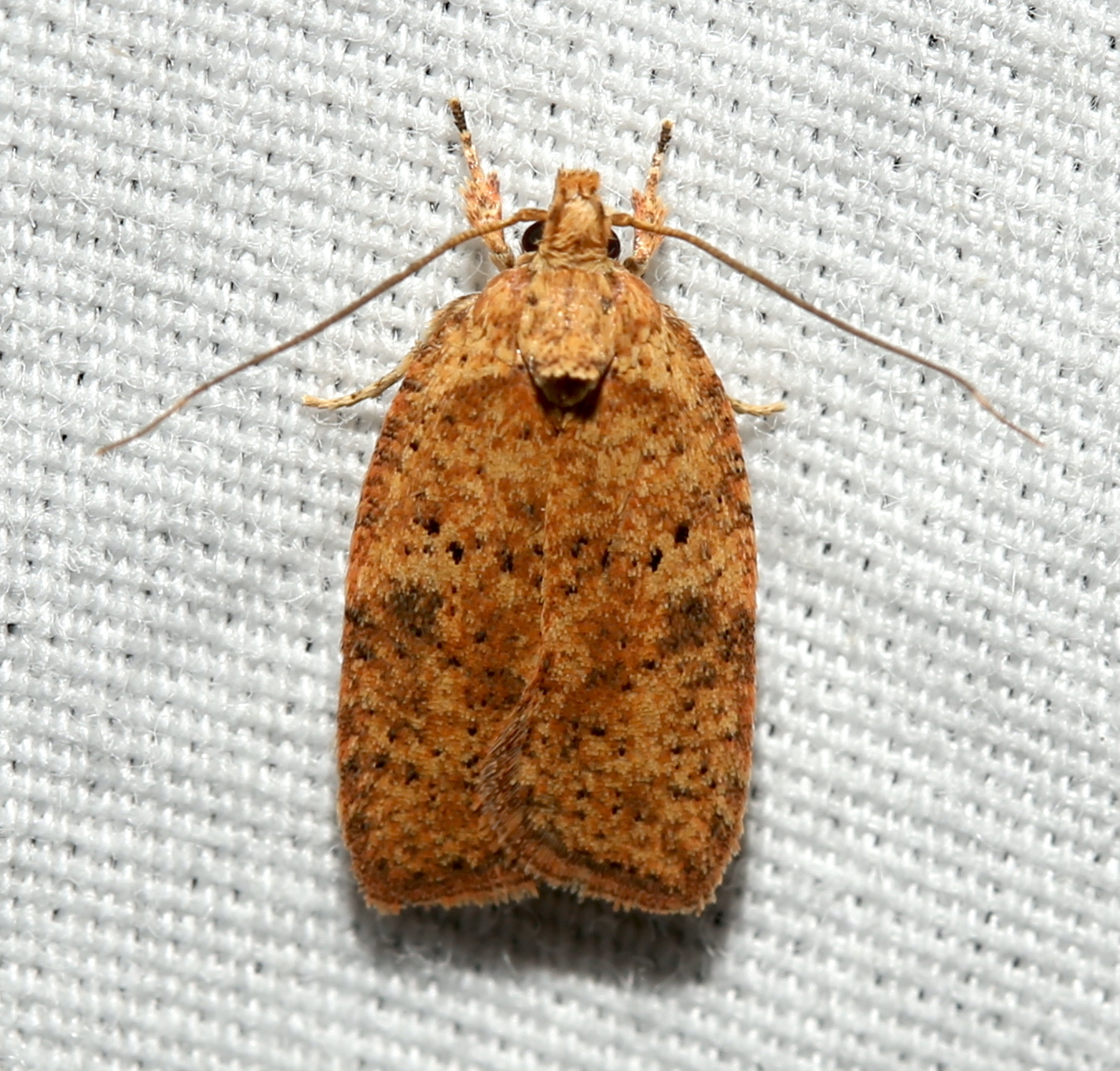

Scientific classification
- Kingdom: Animalia
- Phylum: Arthropoda
- Clade: Pancrustacea
- Class: Insecta
- Order: Lepidoptera
- Family: Depressariidae
- Genus: Agonopterix
- Species: A. thelmae

Binomial name
- Agonopterix thelmae Clarke, 1941

= Agonopterix thelmae =

Species of moth

Thelma's agonopterix moth (Agonopterix thelmae) is a moth of the family Depressariidae. It is found in North America from New England to South Carolina, west to Kentucky and Illinois, north to Michigan and southern Ontario.

The wingspan is about 21 mm.

Adults are on wing from July to October in Kentucky and from August to September in southern Ontario.
