= Agonopterix ordubadensis =

Scientific classification
- Kingdom: Animalia
- Phylum: Arthropoda
- Clade: Pancrustacea
- Class: Insecta
- Order: Lepidoptera
- Family: Depressariidae
- Genus: Agonopterix
- Species: A. ordubadensis

Binomial name
- Agonopterix ordubadensis Hannemann, 1959

Species of moth

Agonopterix ordubadensis is a moth of the family Depressariidae. It is found in Armenia and Russia.
