= Agonopterix epichersa =

Scientific classification
- Kingdom: Animalia
- Phylum: Arthropoda
- Clade: Pancrustacea
- Class: Insecta
- Order: Lepidoptera
- Family: Depressariidae
- Genus: Agonopterix
- Species: A. epichersa

Binomial name
- Agonopterix epichersa (Meyrick, 1914)

Synonyms
- Depressaria epichersa Meyrick, 1914

Species of moth

Agonopterix epichersa is a moth in the family Depressariidae. It was described by Edward Meyrick in 1914. It is found in Sichuan, China.

The wingspan is about 22 mm. The forewings are light fuscous, slightly rosy tinged and finely sprinkled with whitish and with scattered dark fuscous scales. There are about seven small indistinct rather dark fuscous dots along the costa and two indistinct rather dark fuscous spots in the disc about two-fifths. There is a small cloudy fuscous spot towards the costa in the middle. The hindwings are light rosy fuscous sprinkled with whitish.
