= Agonopterix fuscovenella =

Scientific classification
- Kingdom: Animalia
- Phylum: Arthropoda
- Clade: Pancrustacea
- Class: Insecta
- Order: Lepidoptera
- Family: Depressariidae
- Genus: Agonopterix
- Species: A. fuscovenella

Binomial name
- Agonopterix fuscovenella (Rebel, 1917)

Synonyms
- Depressaria fuscovenella Rebel, 1917

Species of moth

Agonopterix fuscovenella is a moth in the family Depressariidae. It was described by Hans Rebel in 1917. It is found in Tunisia.
