= Agonopterix trimenella =

Scientific classification
- Kingdom: Animalia
- Phylum: Arthropoda
- Clade: Pancrustacea
- Class: Insecta
- Order: Lepidoptera
- Family: Depressariidae
- Genus: Agonopterix
- Species: A. trimenella

Binomial name
- Agonopterix trimenella (Walsingham, 1881)

Synonyms
- Depressaria trimenella Walsingham, 1881

Species of moth

Agonopterix trimenella is a moth in the family Depressariidae. It was described by Thomas de Grey, 6th Baron Walsingham, in 1881. It is found in South Africa.

The wingspan is 11–20 mm. The forewings are pale ochreous, partly suffused with a pale brownish shade, especially on the lower half of the wing before the middle, at the extreme end of the cell, and immediately above the anal angle. There is a large blackish patch, starting at the middle of the costa, continued more than half-way to the apex, extending nearly half across the wing, where it ends at its inner angle in a conspicuous black spot, preceded by some detached black scales. Before this patch are three or four blackish spots on the costa, other smaller ones being distributed around the apical margin. The hindwings are pale cinereous.
