= Agonopterix pupillana =

Scientific classification
- Kingdom: Animalia
- Phylum: Arthropoda
- Clade: Pancrustacea
- Class: Insecta
- Order: Lepidoptera
- Family: Depressariidae
- Genus: Agonopterix
- Species: A. pupillana

Binomial name
- Agonopterix pupillana (Wocke, 1887)

Synonyms
- Depressaria pupillana Wocke, 1887

Species of moth

Agonopterix pupillana is a moth of the family Depressariidae. It is found in Italy and Austria.
