= Agonopterix rubrovittella =

Scientific classification
- Kingdom: Animalia
- Phylum: Arthropoda
- Clade: Pancrustacea
- Class: Insecta
- Order: Lepidoptera
- Family: Depressariidae
- Genus: Agonopterix
- Species: A. rubrovittella

Binomial name
- Agonopterix rubrovittella Caradja, 1926

Species of moth

Agonopterix rubrovittella is a moth in the family Depressariidae. It was described by Aristide Caradja in 1926. It is found in Siberia.
