= Agonopterix canuflavella =

Scientific classification
- Kingdom: Animalia
- Phylum: Arthropoda
- Clade: Pancrustacea
- Class: Insecta
- Order: Lepidoptera
- Family: Depressariidae
- Genus: Agonopterix
- Species: A. canuflavella

Binomial name
- Agonopterix canuflavella (Hannemann, 1953)

Synonyms
- Agonopteryx canuflavella Hannemann, 1953

Species of moth

Agonopterix canuflavella is a moth in the family Depressariidae. It was described by Hans-Joachim Hannemann in 1953. It is found in Algeria.
