= Agonopterix issikii =

Scientific classification
- Kingdom: Animalia
- Phylum: Arthropoda
- Clade: Pancrustacea
- Class: Insecta
- Order: Lepidoptera
- Family: Depressariidae
- Genus: Agonopterix
- Species: A. issikii

Binomial name
- Agonopterix issikii Clarke, 1962

Species of moth

Agonopterix issikii is a moth in the family Depressariidae. It was described by Clarke in 1962. It is found in Japan.

The larvae feed on Orixa japonica.
