= Agonopterix chaetosoma =

Scientific classification
- Kingdom: Animalia
- Phylum: Arthropoda
- Clade: Pancrustacea
- Class: Insecta
- Order: Lepidoptera
- Family: Depressariidae
- Genus: Agonopterix
- Species: A. chaetosoma

Binomial name
- Agonopterix chaetosoma Clarke, 1962

Species of moth

Agonopterix chaetosoma is a moth in the family Depressariidae. It was described by Clarke in 1962. It is found in Japan (Honshyu).

The larvae feed on Fagara schinifolia.
