= Agonopterix straminella =

Scientific classification
- Kingdom: Animalia
- Phylum: Arthropoda
- Clade: Pancrustacea
- Class: Insecta
- Order: Lepidoptera
- Family: Depressariidae
- Genus: Agonopterix
- Species: A. straminella

Binomial name
- Agonopterix straminella (Staudinger, 1859)

Synonyms
- Depressaria straminella Staudinger, 1859

Species of moth

Agonopterix straminella is a moth of the family Depressariidae. It is found in Spain, France, Greece, North Africa and Palestina.

The wingspan is 23–24 mm.
