= Agonopterix thaiensis =

Scientific classification
- Kingdom: Animalia
- Phylum: Arthropoda
- Clade: Pancrustacea
- Class: Insecta
- Order: Lepidoptera
- Family: Depressariidae
- Genus: Agonopterix
- Species: A. thaiensis

Binomial name
- Agonopterix thaiensis Hannemann, 1986

Species of moth

Agonopterix thaiensis is a moth in the family Depressariidae. It was described by Hans-Joachim Hannemann in 1986. It is found in Thailand.
