= Agonopterix stigmella =

Scientific classification
- Kingdom: Animalia
- Phylum: Arthropoda
- Clade: Pancrustacea
- Class: Insecta
- Order: Lepidoptera
- Family: Depressariidae
- Genus: Agonopterix
- Species: A. stigmella

Binomial name
- Agonopterix stigmella (Moore, 1878)

Synonyms
- Depressaria stigmella Moore, 1878

Species of moth

Agonopterix stigmella is a moth in the family Depressariidae. It was described by Frederic Moore in 1878. It is found in eastern Turkmenistan.
