= Agonopterix yomogiella =

Scientific classification
- Kingdom: Animalia
- Phylum: Arthropoda
- Clade: Pancrustacea
- Class: Insecta
- Order: Lepidoptera
- Family: Depressariidae
- Genus: Agonopterix
- Species: A. yomogiella

Binomial name
- Agonopterix yomogiella Saito, 1980

Species of moth

Agonopterix yomogiella is a moth in the family Depressariidae. It was described by Saito in 1980. It is found in Japan.
