= Agonopterix echinopella =

Scientific classification
- Kingdom: Animalia
- Phylum: Arthropoda
- Clade: Pancrustacea
- Class: Insecta
- Order: Lepidoptera
- Family: Depressariidae
- Genus: Agonopterix
- Species: A. echinopella

Binomial name
- Agonopterix echinopella (Chrétien, 1907)

Synonyms
- Depressaria echinopella Chrétien, 1907; Depressaria liodryas Meyrick, 1921; Ctenioxena crypsiptila Meyrick, 1923

Species of moth

Agonopterix echinopella is a moth in the family Depressariidae. It was described by Pierre Chrétien in 1907. It is found in Algeria and Palestine.

The wingspan is about 25 mm. The forewings are pale ochreous with a few scattered dark fuscous scales. The discal stigmata is dark fuscous and a similar dot midway between the second and termen and there is a terminal series of fuscous interneural dots. The hindwings are whitish grey, with cloudy dark grey interneural dots on the termen.
