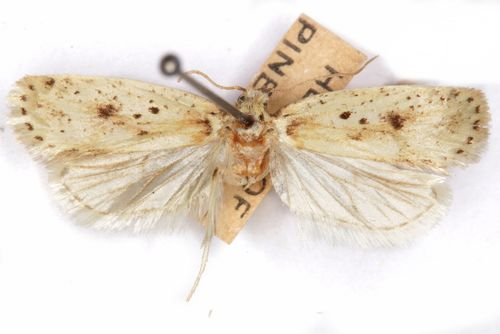

Scientific classification
- Kingdom: Animalia
- Phylum: Arthropoda
- Clade: Pancrustacea
- Class: Insecta
- Order: Lepidoptera
- Family: Depressariidae
- Genus: Agonopterix
- Species: A. chrautis

Binomial name
- Agonopterix chrautis Hodges, 1974

= Agonopterix chrautis =

Species of moth

Agonopterix chrautis is a moth in the family Depressariidae. It was described by Ronald W. Hodges in 1974. It is found in North America, where it has been recorded from Alberta to New Mexico and California.
