= Agonopterix nebulosa =

Scientific classification
- Kingdom: Animalia
- Phylum: Arthropoda
- Clade: Pancrustacea
- Class: Insecta
- Order: Lepidoptera
- Family: Depressariidae
- Genus: Agonopterix
- Species: A. nebulosa

Binomial name
- Agonopterix nebulosa (Zeller, 1873)

Synonyms
- Depressaria nebulosa Zeller, 1873

Species of moth

Agonopterix nebulosa is a moth in the family Depressariidae. It was described by Philipp Christoph Zeller in 1873. It is found in North America, where it has been recorded from Arkansas, Illinois, Iowa, Maine, Maryland and Virginia.

Adults have been recorded on wing from May to June.

The larvae feed on Antennaria plantaginifolia. They tie the leaves of their host plant.
