= Agonopterix latipalpella =

Scientific classification
- Kingdom: Animalia
- Phylum: Arthropoda
- Clade: Pancrustacea
- Class: Insecta
- Order: Lepidoptera
- Family: Depressariidae
- Genus: Agonopterix
- Species: A. latipalpella

Binomial name
- Agonopterix latipalpella Barnes & Busck, 1920

Species of moth

Agonopterix latipalpella is a moth in the family Depressariidae. It was described by William Barnes and August Busck in 1920. It is found in North America, where it has been recorded from Texas.

The wingspan is 17–19 mm. The forewings are light fuscous ocherous, sprinkled with black. The extreme base is light ocherous, edged with black. The light shade continues faintly along the costa, hardly paler than the rest of the wing and there is a series of black cloudy costal spots. The hindwings are ocherous fuscous.
