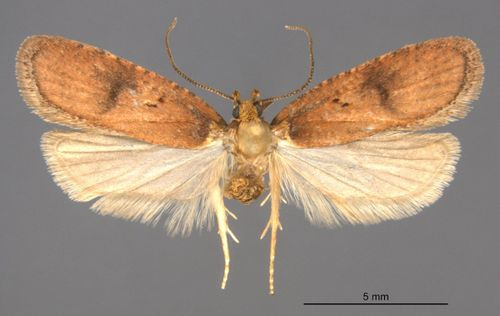

Scientific classification
- Kingdom: Animalia
- Phylum: Arthropoda
- Clade: Pancrustacea
- Class: Insecta
- Order: Lepidoptera
- Family: Depressariidae
- Genus: Agonopterix
- Species: A. nubiferella

Binomial name
- Agonopterix nubiferella (Walsingham, 1881)

Synonyms
- Depressaria nubiferella Walsingham, 1881

= Agonopterix nubiferella =

Species of moth

Agonopterix nubiferella is a moth in the family Depressariidae. It was described by Thomas de Grey, 6th Baron Walsingham, in 1881. It is found in North America, where it has been recorded from northern California to British Columbia.

The wingspan is 18–20 mm. The forewings are ochreous, the extreme base (except the costa) unmarked, while the remainder is suffused with brownish red and irrorated with scattered fuscous scales. There is a dark brownish-red shade with a fuscous central discal dot from the costa, across the end of the cell, almost to the inner margin. This shade is preceded by two distinct brownish-red discal dots. There is a series of reddish-fuscous spots along the costa and a line of the same colour around the termen. The hindwings are greyish fuscous.

The larvae feed on Hypericum perforatum.
