= Agonopterix compacta =

Scientific classification
- Kingdom: Animalia
- Phylum: Arthropoda
- Clade: Pancrustacea
- Class: Insecta
- Order: Lepidoptera
- Family: Depressariidae
- Genus: Agonopterix
- Species: A. compacta

Binomial name
- Agonopterix compacta (Meyrick, 1914)

Synonyms
- Depressaria compacta Meyrick, 1914

Species of moth

Agonopterix compacta is a moth in the family Depressariidae. It was described by Edward Meyrick in 1914. It is found in South Africa.

The wingspan is 19–20 mm. The forewings are whitish ochreous, partially tinged with brownish and with some scattered blackish specks and a blackish-grey spot on the base of the costa, its edge marked with a black dot above the middle of the wing. The hindwings are ochreous whitish, slightly tinged with grey.
