= Agonopterix dilatata =

Scientific classification
- Kingdom: Animalia
- Phylum: Arthropoda
- Clade: Pancrustacea
- Class: Insecta
- Order: Lepidoptera
- Family: Depressariidae
- Genus: Agonopterix
- Species: A. dilatata

Binomial name
- Agonopterix dilatata S.X. Wang, 2007

Species of moth

Agonopterix dilatata is a moth in the family Depressariidae. It was described by S.X. Wang in 2007. It is found in China.
