= Agonopterix exquisitella =

Scientific classification
- Kingdom: Animalia
- Phylum: Arthropoda
- Clade: Pancrustacea
- Class: Insecta
- Order: Lepidoptera
- Family: Depressariidae
- Genus: Agonopterix
- Species: A. exquisitella

Binomial name
- Agonopterix exquisitella (Caradja, 1920)

Synonyms
- Depressaria exquisitella Caradja, 1920

Species of moth

Agonopterix exquisitella is a moth in the family Depressariidae. It was described by Aristide Caradja in 1920. It is found in south-eastern Siberia.
