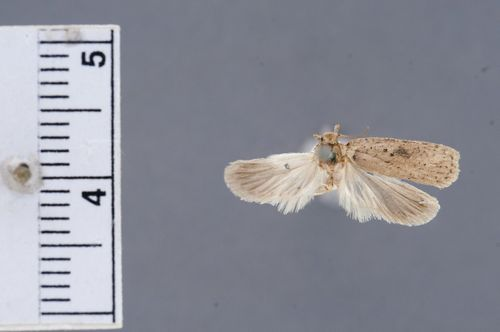

Scientific classification
- Kingdom: Animalia
- Phylum: Arthropoda
- Clade: Pancrustacea
- Class: Insecta
- Order: Lepidoptera
- Family: Depressariidae
- Genus: Agonopterix
- Species: A. amissella

Binomial name
- Agonopterix amissella (Busck, 1908)

Synonyms
- Depressaria amissella Busck, 1908

= Agonopterix amissella =

Species of moth

Agonopterix amissella is a moth in the family Depressariidae. It was described by August Busck in 1908. It is found in North America, where it has been recorded from Florida.

The wingspan is about 17 mm. The forewings are ochreous brown, sparsely sprinkled with black scales, especially on the costal apical area. The extreme base is somewhat lighter than the rest of the wing, and this light shade is faintly continued along the base of the costal edge. The basal area is sharply limited by a short black streak from the dorsal edge. There are two round deep black dots in the middle of the disc and there is an ill-defined blackish-brown blotch just before the end of the cell. The hindwings are light ochreous fuscous.
