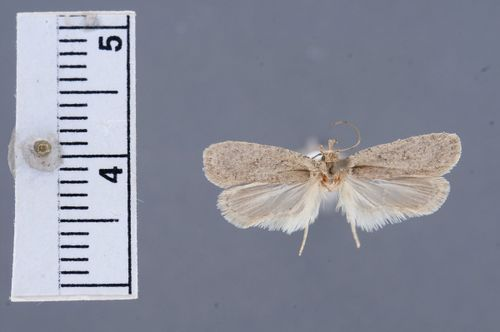

Scientific classification
- Kingdom: Animalia
- Phylum: Arthropoda
- Clade: Pancrustacea
- Class: Insecta
- Order: Lepidoptera
- Family: Depressariidae
- Genus: Agonopterix
- Species: A. cajonensis

Binomial name
- Agonopterix cajonensis J. F. G. Clarke, 1941

= Agonopterix cajonensis =

Species of moth

Agonopterix cajonensis is a moth in the family Depressariidae. It was described by John Frederick Gates Clarke in 1941. It is found in North America, where it has been recorded from California.

The wingspan is 20–23 mm. The forewings are grayish fuscous, overlaid with ocherous-white. The base of the forewings is and the basal third of the costa is ocherous-white. The light basal area is followed by a dark fuscous shade. The whole forewing is irrorated (speckled) with small fuscous spots and there is an ocherous-white spot, narrowly edged with fuscous, at the end of the cell. The hindwings are grayish fuscous.
