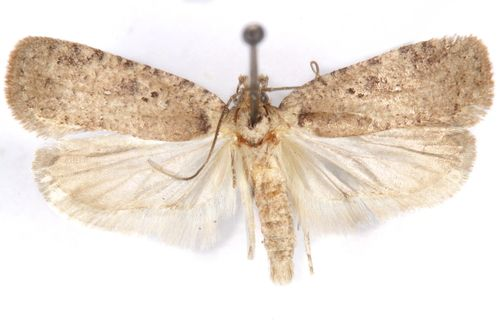

Scientific classification
- Kingdom: Animalia
- Phylum: Arthropoda
- Clade: Pancrustacea
- Class: Insecta
- Order: Lepidoptera
- Family: Depressariidae
- Genus: Agonopterix
- Species: A. clarkei

Binomial name
- Agonopterix clarkei Keifer, 1936

Synonyms
- Agonopteryx clarkei Keifer, 1936

= Agonopterix clarkei =

Species of moth

Agonopterix clarkei is a moth in the family Depressariidae. It was described by Keifer in 1936. It is found in North America, where it has been recorded from California, Washington and Manitoba.

The larvae feed on Artermisia vulgaris.
