= Agonopterix hamriella =

Scientific classification
- Kingdom: Animalia
- Phylum: Arthropoda
- Clade: Pancrustacea
- Class: Insecta
- Order: Lepidoptera
- Family: Depressariidae
- Genus: Agonopterix
- Species: A. hamriella

Binomial name
- Agonopterix hamriella (Chrétien, 1922)

Synonyms
- Depressaria hamriella Chrétien, 1922

Species of moth

Agonopterix hamriella is a moth in the family Depressariidae. It was described by Pierre Chrétien in 1922. It is found in Morocco.
