= Agonopterix rubristricta =

Scientific classification
- Kingdom: Animalia
- Phylum: Arthropoda
- Clade: Pancrustacea
- Class: Insecta
- Order: Lepidoptera
- Family: Depressariidae
- Genus: Agonopterix
- Species: A. rubristricta

Binomial name
- Agonopterix rubristricta (Walsingham, 1912)

Synonyms
- Agonopteryx rubristricta Walsingham, 1912

Species of moth

Agonopterix rubristricta is a moth in the family Depressariidae. It was described by Thomas de Grey, 6th Baron Walsingham, in 1912. It is found in Guatemala.

The wingspan is about 24 mm. The forewings are greyish brown, with a strong purplish vinous suffusion. There is a series of irregular pale ochreous spots and streaks along the costa, some groups of white scales below its middle and outer third, and a bright longitudinal brick-red streak below the costa, at about one-third from the base. Below this are two black spots on the disc, one below the other, followed by a streak of white scales, with one or two brick-red scales at its outer end. On the outer end of the cell is a small white spot, there is also an outwardly oblique whitish streak arising from the dorsum, close to the base. Some lines of alternate pale cinereous and purplish fuscous speckling run along and below the fold, some sprinkling of the same between the cell and the termen. The hindwings are pale grey, with a slight brownish tinge toward the apex.
