= Agonopterix leucadensis =

Scientific classification
- Kingdom: Animalia
- Phylum: Arthropoda
- Clade: Pancrustacea
- Class: Insecta
- Order: Lepidoptera
- Family: Depressariidae
- Genus: Agonopterix
- Species: A. leucadensis

Binomial name
- Agonopterix leucadensis (Rebel, 1932)

Synonyms
- Depressaria leucadensis Rebel, 1932

Species of moth

Agonopterix leucadensis is a moth of the family Depressariidae. It is found in Greece.
