= Agonopterix encentra =

Scientific classification
- Kingdom: Animalia
- Phylum: Arthropoda
- Clade: Pancrustacea
- Class: Insecta
- Order: Lepidoptera
- Family: Depressariidae
- Genus: Agonopterix
- Species: A. encentra

Binomial name
- Agonopterix encentra (Meyrick, 1914)

Synonyms
- Depressaria encentra Meyrick, 1914

Species of moth

Agonopterix encentra is a moth in the family Depressariidae. It was described by Edward Meyrick in 1914. It is found in Japan and the Russian Far East.

The wingspan is about 22 mm. The forewings are light ochreous brownish, with scattered black specks, especially on the veins. There is a grey oblique mark from the dorsum near the base and four blackish dots on the termen. The hindwings are dark grey, lighter towards the base.
