= Agonopterix coenosella =

Scientific classification
- Kingdom: Animalia
- Phylum: Arthropoda
- Clade: Pancrustacea
- Class: Insecta
- Order: Lepidoptera
- Family: Depressariidae
- Genus: Agonopterix
- Species: A. coenosella

Binomial name
- Agonopterix coenosella Zerny, 1940

Species of moth

Agonopterix coenosella is a moth in the family Depressariidae. It was described by Hans Zerny in 1940. It is found in Turkmenistan and Tajikistan.
