= Agonopterix ligusticella =

Scientific classification
- Kingdom: Animalia
- Phylum: Arthropoda
- Clade: Pancrustacea
- Class: Insecta
- Order: Lepidoptera
- Family: Depressariidae
- Genus: Agonopterix
- Species: A. ligusticella

Binomial name
- Agonopterix ligusticella (Chretien, 1908)

Synonyms
- Depressaria ligusticella Chretien, 1908

Species of moth

Agonopterix ligusticella is a moth of the family Depressariidae. It is found in southern France, where it has been recorded from the Pyrenees.

The wingspan is about 18 mm.
