= Agonopterix ramosella =

Scientific classification
- Kingdom: Animalia
- Phylum: Arthropoda
- Clade: Pancrustacea
- Class: Insecta
- Order: Lepidoptera
- Family: Depressariidae
- Genus: Agonopterix
- Species: A. ramosella

Binomial name
- Agonopterix ramosella (Stainton, 1867)

Synonyms
- Depressaria ramosella Stainton, 1867

Species of moth

Agonopterix ramosella is a moth in the family Depressariidae. It was described by Henry Tibbats Stainton in 1867. It is found in Armenia and the Alay Mountains.
