= Agonopterix petraea =

Scientific classification
- Kingdom: Animalia
- Phylum: Arthropoda
- Clade: Pancrustacea
- Class: Insecta
- Order: Lepidoptera
- Family: Depressariidae
- Genus: Agonopterix
- Species: A. petraea

Binomial name
- Agonopterix petraea (Meyrick, 1910)

Synonyms
- Depressaria petraea Meyrick, 1910

Species of moth

Agonopterix petraea is a moth in the family Depressariidae. It was described by Edward Meyrick in 1910. It is found in Sri Lanka.

The wingspan is 17–22 mm. The forewings are dark purple fuscous, with scattered rough black scales and more or less pale ochreous irroration (speckles) towards the costa anteriorly. The first discal stigma represented by two very obliquely placed small tufts of black and whitish-ochreous scales and the second by a larger mostly black transverse tuft. There is a curved patch of undefined brownish suffusion in the disc posteriorly and an undefined black terminal line interrupted with whitish ochreous. The hindwings are thinly scaled, bronzy fuscous, with darker veins.
