= Agonopterix likiangella =

Scientific classification
- Kingdom: Animalia
- Phylum: Arthropoda
- Clade: Pancrustacea
- Class: Insecta
- Order: Lepidoptera
- Family: Depressariidae
- Genus: Agonopterix
- Species: A. likiangella

Binomial name
- Agonopterix likiangella Lvovsky & S.-X. Wang, 2011

Species of moth

Agonopterix likiangella is a moth in the family Depressariidae. It was described by Alexandr L. Lvovsky and Shu-Xia Wang in 2011. It is found in Yunnan, China.

The wingspan is 20–22 millimetres (0.79–0.87 in).

== Etymology ==
The species name is derived from Likiang, the type locality.
