= Agonopterix invenustella =

Scientific classification
- Kingdom: Animalia
- Phylum: Arthropoda
- Clade: Pancrustacea
- Class: Insecta
- Order: Lepidoptera
- Family: Depressariidae
- Genus: Agonopterix
- Species: A. invenustella

Binomial name
- Agonopterix invenustella (Hannemann, 1953)

Synonyms
- Agonopteryx invenustella Hannemann, 1953

Species of moth

Agonopterix invenustella is a moth in the family Depressariidae. It was described by Hans-Joachim Hannemann in 1953. It is found in Algeria.
