= Agonopterix cynarivora =

Scientific classification
- Kingdom: Animalia
- Phylum: Arthropoda
- Clade: Pancrustacea
- Class: Insecta
- Order: Lepidoptera
- Family: Depressariidae
- Genus: Agonopterix
- Species: A. cynarivora

Binomial name
- Agonopterix cynarivora Meyrick, 1932

Species of moth

Agonopterix cynarivora is a moth in the family Depressariidae. It was described by Edward Meyrick in 1932. It is found in Morocco.
