= Agonopterix dryocrates =

Scientific classification
- Kingdom: Animalia
- Phylum: Arthropoda
- Clade: Pancrustacea
- Class: Insecta
- Order: Lepidoptera
- Family: Depressariidae
- Genus: Agonopterix
- Species: A. dryocrates

Binomial name
- Agonopterix dryocrates (Meyrick, 1921)

Synonyms
- Depressaria dryocrates Meyrick, 1921

Species of moth

Agonopterix dryocrates is a moth in the family Depressariidae. It was described by Edward Meyrick in 1921. It is found in South Africa.
