= Agonopterix graecella =

Scientific classification
- Kingdom: Animalia
- Phylum: Arthropoda
- Clade: Pancrustacea
- Class: Insecta
- Order: Lepidoptera
- Family: Depressariidae
- Genus: Agonopterix
- Species: A. graecella

Binomial name
- Agonopterix graecella Hannemann, 1976

Species of moth

Agonopterix graecella is a moth of the family Depressariidae. It is found in Greece and Italy.
