= Agonopterix flurii =

Scientific classification
- Kingdom: Animalia
- Phylum: Arthropoda
- Clade: Pancrustacea
- Class: Insecta
- Order: Lepidoptera
- Family: Depressariidae
- Genus: Agonopterix
- Species: A. flurii

Binomial name
- Agonopterix flurii Sonderegger, 2013

Species of moth

Agonopterix flurii is a moth in the family Depressariidae. It was described by Sonderegger in 2013. It is found in the Alps in Switzerland.

The wingspan is 16.5–19 mm for males and 16–18 mm for females. Adults are on wing in August and September.

The larvae feed on Centaurea scabiosa.
