= Agonopterix takamukui =

Scientific classification
- Kingdom: Animalia
- Phylum: Arthropoda
- Clade: Pancrustacea
- Class: Insecta
- Order: Lepidoptera
- Family: Depressariidae
- Genus: Agonopterix
- Species: A. takamukui

Binomial name
- Agonopterix takamukui (Matsumura, 1931)

Synonyms
- Depressaria takamukui Matsumura, 1931

Species of moth

Agonopterix takamukui is a moth in the family Depressariidae. It was described by Shōnen Matsumura in 1931. It is found in Japan (Kyushu) and the Russian Far East (Amur and Primorye regions).
