= Agonopterix xylinopis =

Scientific classification
- Kingdom: Animalia
- Phylum: Arthropoda
- Clade: Pancrustacea
- Class: Insecta
- Order: Lepidoptera
- Family: Depressariidae
- Genus: Agonopterix
- Species: A. xylinopis

Binomial name
- Agonopterix xylinopis (Caradja, 1931)

Synonyms
- Depressaria xylinopis Caradja, 1931

Species of moth

Agonopterix xylinopis is a moth in the family Depressariidae. It was described by Aristide Caradja in 1931. It is found in China.
