= Agonopterix leptopa =

Scientific classification
- Kingdom: Animalia
- Phylum: Arthropoda
- Clade: Pancrustacea
- Class: Insecta
- Order: Lepidoptera
- Family: Depressariidae
- Genus: Agonopterix
- Species: A. leptopa

Binomial name
- Agonopterix leptopa (Diakonoff, 1952)

Synonyms
- Cryptolechia leptopa Diakonoff, 1952

Species of moth

Agonopterix leptopa is a moth in the family Depressariidae. It was described by Alexey Diakonoff in 1952. It is found in China (northern Yunnan) and north-eastern Myanmar.
