= Agonopterix iliensis =

Scientific classification
- Kingdom: Animalia
- Phylum: Arthropoda
- Clade: Pancrustacea
- Class: Insecta
- Order: Lepidoptera
- Family: Depressariidae
- Genus: Agonopterix
- Species: A. iliensis

Binomial name
- Agonopterix iliensis (Rebel, 1936)

Synonyms
- Depressaria iliensis Rebel, 1936

Species of moth

Agonopterix iliensis is a moth of the family Depressariidae. It is found in Italy and on Sardinia.
