= Agonopterix dubatolovi =

Scientific classification
- Kingdom: Animalia
- Phylum: Arthropoda
- Clade: Pancrustacea
- Class: Insecta
- Order: Lepidoptera
- Family: Depressariidae
- Genus: Agonopterix
- Species: A. dubatolovi

Binomial name
- Agonopterix dubatolovi Lvovsky, 1995

Species of moth

Agonopterix dubatolovi is a moth in the family Depressariidae. It was described by Alexandr L. Lvovsky in 1995. It is found in Russia, where it has been recorded from Chita Oblast.
