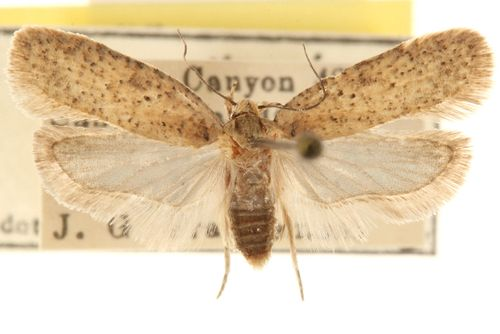

Scientific classification
- Kingdom: Animalia
- Phylum: Arthropoda
- Clade: Pancrustacea
- Class: Insecta
- Order: Lepidoptera
- Family: Depressariidae
- Genus: Agonopterix
- Species: A. dammersi

Binomial name
- Agonopterix dammersi Clarke, 1947

= Agonopterix dammersi =

Species of moth

Agonopterix dammersi is a moth in the family Depressariidae. It was described by Clarke in 1947. It is found in North America, where it has been recorded from southern Arizona and California.

The larvae feed on Senecio douglasii and Eriophyllum species.
