= Agonopterix dideganella =

Scientific classification
- Kingdom: Animalia
- Phylum: Arthropoda
- Clade: Pancrustacea
- Class: Insecta
- Order: Lepidoptera
- Family: Depressariidae
- Genus: Agonopterix
- Species: A. dideganella

Binomial name
- Agonopterix dideganella Amsel, 1972

Species of moth

Agonopterix dideganella is a moth in the family Depressariidae. It was described by Hans Georg Amsel in 1972. It is found in Iran.
