= Agonopterix taciturna =

Scientific classification
- Kingdom: Animalia
- Phylum: Arthropoda
- Clade: Pancrustacea
- Class: Insecta
- Order: Lepidoptera
- Family: Depressariidae
- Genus: Agonopterix
- Species: A. taciturna

Binomial name
- Agonopterix taciturna (Meyrick, 1910)

Synonyms
- Depressaria taciturna Meyrick, 1910

Species of moth

Agonopterix taciturna is a moth in the family Depressariidae. It was described by Edward Meyrick in 1910. It is found in the Himalayas, the Russian Far East and Japan.

The wingspan is 24–25 mm. The forewings are brownish, sprinkled with darker, the costal and terminal areas sprinkled with fuscous whitish. There are two indistinctly indicated oblique darker streaks from the costa towards the base, the apex of the second more or less marked with dark fuscous. The first discal stigma is indicated by an oblique dark fuscous mark and the second by a fuscous-whitish dot, edged with some darker scales. These are connected by an indistinct streak of darker suffusion and there is an interrupted similar streak along the postmedian fold. There is also a darker curved subterminal line and a series of cloudy dots of dark fuscous irroration around the apex and termen. The hindwings are pale fuscous, darker posteriorly.
