= Agonopterix bipunctifera =

Scientific classification
- Kingdom: Animalia
- Phylum: Arthropoda
- Clade: Pancrustacea
- Class: Insecta
- Order: Lepidoptera
- Family: Depressariidae
- Genus: Agonopterix
- Species: A. bipunctifera

Binomial name
- Agonopterix bipunctifera (Matsumura, 1931)

Synonyms
- Depressaria bipunctifera Matsumura, 1931

Species of moth

Agonopterix bipunctifera is a moth in the family Depressariidae. It was described by Shōnen Matsumura in 1931. It is found in the Japanese islands of Honshu and Hokkaido and on the Kuriles of Russia.

The wingspan is about 13 mm.
