= Agonopterix septicella =

Scientific classification
- Kingdom: Animalia
- Phylum: Arthropoda
- Clade: Pancrustacea
- Class: Insecta
- Order: Lepidoptera
- Family: Depressariidae
- Genus: Agonopterix
- Species: A. septicella

Binomial name
- Agonopterix septicella (Snellen, 1884)

Synonyms
- Depressaria septicella Snellen, 1884

Species of moth

Agonopterix septicella is a moth in the family Depressariidae. It was described by Snellen in 1884. It is found in south-eastern Siberia.
