= Agonopterix goughi =

Scientific classification
- Kingdom: Animalia
- Phylum: Arthropoda
- Clade: Pancrustacea
- Class: Insecta
- Order: Lepidoptera
- Family: Depressariidae
- Genus: Agonopterix
- Species: A. goughi

Binomial name
- Agonopterix goughi (Bradley, 1958)

Synonyms
- Egonopterix goughi Bradley, 1958; Exaeretia goughi Bradley, 1958

Species of moth

Agonopterix goughi is a moth in the family Depressariidae. It was described by John David Bradley in 1958. It is found in South Africa and Saint Helena (Gough Island).
