= Agonopterix occaecata =

Scientific classification
- Kingdom: Animalia
- Phylum: Arthropoda
- Clade: Pancrustacea
- Class: Insecta
- Order: Lepidoptera
- Family: Depressariidae
- Genus: Agonopterix
- Species: A. occaecata

Binomial name
- Agonopterix occaecata (Meyrick, 1922)

Synonyms
- Depressaria occaecata Meyrick, 1922

Species of moth

Agonopterix occaecata is a moth in the family Depressariidae. It was described by Edward Meyrick in 1922. It is found in the Levant.

The wingspan is about 21 mm. The forewings are pale ochreous, partially faintly pinkish tinged. The first discal stigma is blackish, with an additional dot obliquely before and above it. The second discal is indicated only by a faint partial grey margin. There are also three or four indistinct dark grey terminal dots. The hindwings are ochreous whitish.
