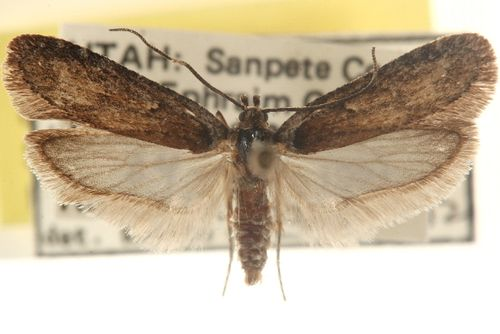

Scientific classification
- Kingdom: Animalia
- Phylum: Arthropoda
- Clade: Pancrustacea
- Class: Insecta
- Order: Lepidoptera
- Family: Depressariidae
- Genus: Agonopterix
- Species: A. psoraliella

Binomial name
- Agonopterix psoraliella (Walsingham, 1881)

Synonyms
- Depressaria psoraliella Walsingham, 1881; Depressaria murmurans Meyrick, 1927

= Agonopterix psoraliella =

Species of moth

Agonopterix psoraliella is a moth in the family Depressariidae. It was described by Thomas de Grey, 6th Baron Walsingham, in 1881. It is found in North America, where it has been recorded from California to Washington, Utah, South Dakota and Arizona.

The wingspan is 20–24 mm. The forewings are deep red-brown, irrorated with blackish fuscous and grey. There are two small yellowish discal dots at the basal third, followed by another at the end of the cell. All spots are edged with deep red. There is a series of indistinct blackish-fuscous spots along the costa and around the termen. The hindwings are dark greyish-fuscous.

The larvae feed on Psoralea lanceolata and Psoralea physodes.
