= Agonopterix neoxesta =

Scientific classification
- Kingdom: Animalia
- Phylum: Arthropoda
- Clade: Pancrustacea
- Class: Insecta
- Order: Lepidoptera
- Family: Depressariidae
- Genus: Agonopterix
- Species: A. neoxesta

Binomial name
- Agonopterix neoxesta (Meyrick, 1918)

Synonyms
- Depressaria neoxesta Meyrick, 1918

Species of moth

Agonopterix neoxesta is a moth in the family Depressariidae. It was described by Edward Meyrick in 1918. It is found in South Africa.
