= Agonopterix vasta =

Scientific classification
- Kingdom: Animalia
- Phylum: Arthropoda
- Clade: Pancrustacea
- Class: Insecta
- Order: Lepidoptera
- Family: Depressariidae
- Genus: Agonopterix
- Species: A. vasta

Binomial name
- Agonopterix vasta (Amsel, 1935)

Synonyms
- Depressaria vasta Amsel, 1935

Species of moth

Agonopterix vasta is a moth in the family Depressariidae. It was described by Hans Georg Amsel in 1935. It is found in Palestine.
