= Agonopterix rimulella =

Scientific classification
- Kingdom: Animalia
- Phylum: Arthropoda
- Clade: Pancrustacea
- Class: Insecta
- Order: Lepidoptera
- Family: Depressariidae
- Genus: Agonopterix
- Species: A. rimulella

Binomial name
- Agonopterix rimulella (Caradja, 1920)

Synonyms
- Depressaria rimulella Caradja, 1920

Species of moth

Agonopterix rimulella is a moth of the family Depressariidae. It is found in the Russian Far East, north-eastern China and Japan.
