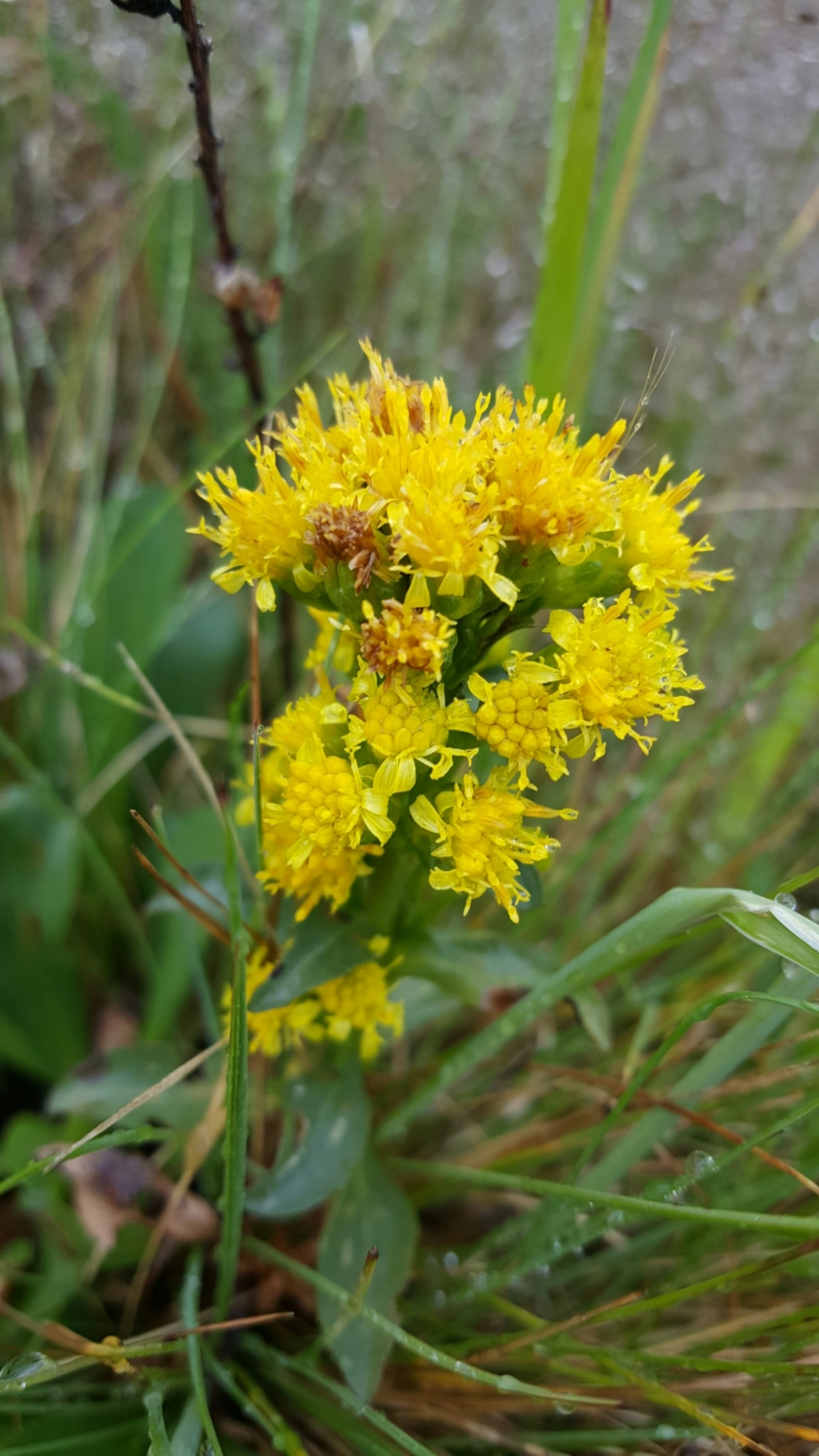

Scientific classification
- Kingdom: Plantae
- Clade: Tracheophytes
- Clade: Angiosperms
- Clade: Eudicots
- Clade: Asterids
- Order: Asterales
- Family: Asteraceae
- Genus: Senecio
- Species: S. aronicoides

Binomial name
- Senecio aronicoides DC.

Synonyms
- Senecio leptolepis Senecio rawsonianus

= Senecio aronicoides =

Species of flowering plant

Senecio aronicoides is a species of flowering plant in the aster family known by the common name rayless ragwort. It is native to Oregon and northern and central California, where it can be found in the woodlands and forests of mountains and foothills, often in relatively dry habitat. It is a biennial or perennial herb growing up to about 90 centimeters tall from a fleshy root attached to a buttonlike caudex. The plant is often slightly woolly or cobwebby in texture. The leaves have lance-shaped to oval blades measuring up to 20 centimeters long, the largest ones lower on the stem. The inflorescence is a corymb which is flat and spreading, often resembling an umbel. The flower heads are cups lined with black- or green-tipped phyllaries and filled with many gold disc florets. There are usually no ray florets but one or two occasionally emerge from a head. The fruit is a hairless achene tipped with a pappus of long, white bristles.
