= Depressaria leptotaeniae =

Scientific classification
- Domain: Eukaryota
- Kingdom: Animalia
- Phylum: Arthropoda
- Class: Insecta
- Order: Lepidoptera
- Family: Depressariidae
- Genus: Depressaria
- Species: D. leptotaeniae

Binomial name
- Depressaria leptotaeniae J. F. G. Clarke, 1933

Species of moth

Depressaria leptotaeniae is a moth in the family Depressariidae. It was described by John Frederick Gates Clarke in 1933. It is found in North America, where it has been recorded from Oregon, Alberta, Idaho and Washington.

The wingspan is 17–23 mm.

The larvae feed on Lomatium dissectum.
