= Depressaria betina =

Scientific classification
- Domain: Eukaryota
- Kingdom: Animalia
- Phylum: Arthropoda
- Class: Insecta
- Order: Lepidoptera
- Family: Depressariidae
- Genus: Depressaria
- Species: D. betina

Binomial name
- Depressaria betina J. F. G. Clarke, 1947

Species of moth

Depressaria betina is a moth in the family Depressariidae. It was described by John Frederick Gates Clarke in 1947. It is found in North America, where it has been recorded from California to Washington.

The larvae feed on Lomatium nudicaule, Lomatium triternatum, Lomatium columbianum and Lomatium dissectum.
