= Depressaria assalella =

Scientific classification
- Domain: Eukaryota
- Kingdom: Animalia
- Phylum: Arthropoda
- Class: Insecta
- Order: Lepidoptera
- Family: Depressariidae
- Genus: Depressaria
- Species: D. assalella

Binomial name
- Depressaria assalella Chrétien, 1915

Species of moth

Depressaria assalella is a moth of the family Depressariidae. It is found in Algeria.
