= Depressaria besma =

Scientific classification
- Domain: Eukaryota
- Kingdom: Animalia
- Phylum: Arthropoda
- Class: Insecta
- Order: Lepidoptera
- Family: Depressariidae
- Genus: Depressaria
- Species: D. besma

Binomial name
- Depressaria besma Clarke, 1947

Species of moth

Depressaria besma is a moth in the family Depressariidae. It was described by Clarke in 1947. It is found in North America, where it has been recorded from Washington and California.

The larvae feed on Lomatium utriculatum.
