= Depressaria macrotrichella =

Scientific classification
- Domain: Eukaryota
- Kingdom: Animalia
- Phylum: Arthropoda
- Class: Insecta
- Order: Lepidoptera
- Family: Depressariidae
- Genus: Depressaria
- Species: D. macrotrichella

Binomial name
- Depressaria macrotrichella Rebel, 1917

Species of moth

Depressaria macrotrichella is a moth in the family Depressariidae. It was described by Hans Rebel in 1917. It is found in northern Iran and Egypt.
