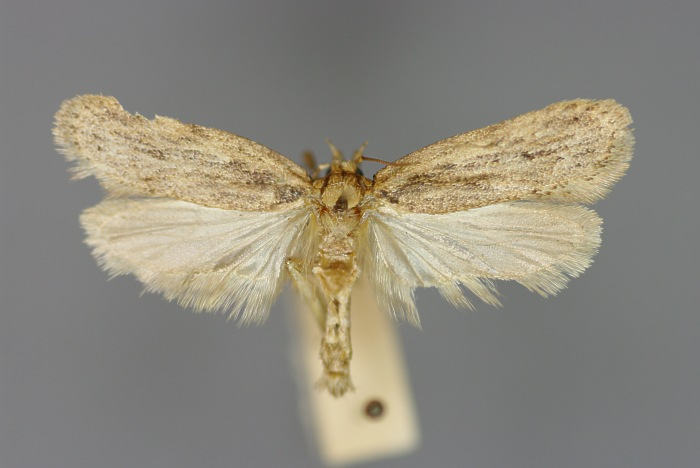

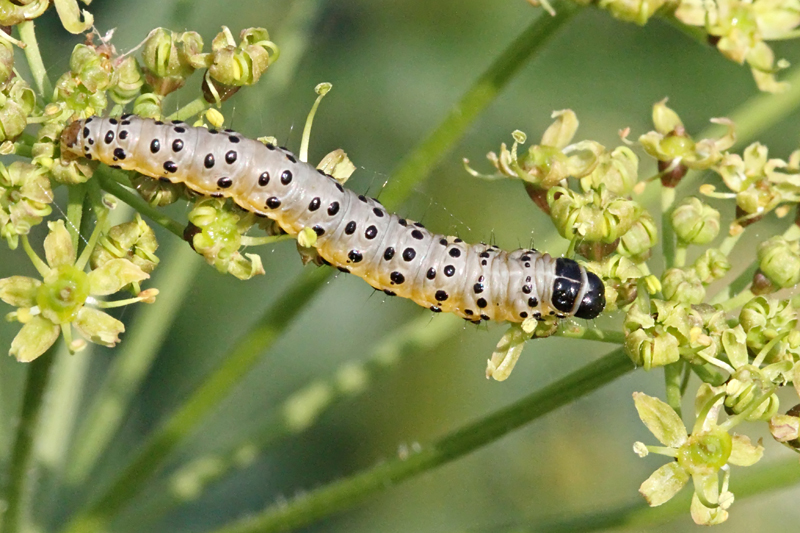

Scientific classification
- Kingdom: Animalia
- Phylum: Arthropoda
- Clade: Pancrustacea
- Class: Insecta
- Order: Lepidoptera
- Family: Depressariidae
- Genus: Depressaria
- Species: D. radiella

Binomial name
- Depressaria radiella (Goeze, 1783)

Synonyms
- Phalaena radiella Goeze, 1783; Haemilis pastinacella Duponchel, 1838; Phalaena heraclei Retzius, 1783; Depressaria heraclei; Depressaria sphondiliella Bruand, 1851; Depressaria ontariella Bethune, 1870; Depressaria caucasica Christoph, 1877; Depressaria obscura Dufrane, 1957; Depressaria marginata Dufrane, 1957; Depressaria lineata Dufrane, 1957

= Depressaria radiella =

Parsnip webworm

Depressaria radiella, the parsnip moth or parsnip webworm, is a moth of the family Depressariidae. It is found in most of Europe, except Portugal and most of the Balkan Peninsula. This species has also been introduced into New Zealand.

The wingspan is 19–27 millimetres (3/4–1 in). Separated from similar species by the numerous longitudinal black streaks emanating from central area of discmost terminating at fascia at 3/4 but always finishing before the termen and closely following the venation.

Adults are on wing from August to (after overwintering in a sheltered place) May of the following year. There is one generation per year.

The larvae feed on Heracleum sphondylium, Pastinaca sativa and Apium nodiflorum. They feed on the flowers and developing seeds, defending their territory by enclosing an umbel in silk, while safely metabolizing the ingested furocoumarins. Pupation takes place in the main stem of the food plant.

== Taxonomy ==
Depressaria radiella is the type species of the genus Depressaria. Its scientific name has been much confused for about 200 years. A.H. Haworth, on establishing the genus Depressaria in his 1811 issues of Lepidoptera Britannica, called the eventual type species Phalaena heraclei, an unjustified emendation of P. (Tortrix) heracliana. In this he followed such entomologists of his time as A.J. Retzius, who in 1783 had believed the parsnip moth to be a species originally described by Carl Linnaeus in 1758. But in fact, this was a misidentification; Linnaeus' moth was actually the one known today as Agonopterix heracliana. To make matters worse, J. Curtis popularized another incorrect spelling, D. heracleana, apparently first introduced (as Pyralis heracleana) by J.C. Fabricius in his 1775 Systema Entomologiae.

When the error of Retzius, Haworth and others was realized, it was assumed that the parsnip moth was only validly described (as Haemilis pastinacella) by P.A.J. Duponchel in 1838, and consequently it was throughout much of the 20th century known as D. pastinacella. But according to the ICZN's judgement, there already was an older valid description – that of J.A.E. Goeze, who in 1783 named the species Phalaena radiella. Thus, the correct scientific name of the type species is D. radiella.

== Distribution ==
=== Introduced ===
D. pastinacella was first known to be present in North America in 1883. This species has also been recorded in New Zealand in January 2004.

== Interactions with hosts ==
Sphondin - a furanocoumarin - is a chemical produced by some plants. It deters D. pastinacella and higher amounts confer even higher host resistance. Over the time of D. pastinacella's presence in North America, parsnips (Pastinaca sativa) have evolved steadily higher amounts of sphondin production. This likely indicates coevolution with D. pastinacella.
