= Depressaria varzobella =

Scientific classification
- Kingdom: Animalia
- Phylum: Arthropoda
- Clade: Pancrustacea
- Class: Insecta
- Order: Lepidoptera
- Family: Depressariidae
- Genus: Depressaria
- Species: D. varzobella

Binomial name
- Depressaria varzobella Lvovsky, 1982

Species of moth

Depressaria varzobella is a moth in the family Depressariidae. It was described by Alexandr L. Lvovsky in 1982. It is found in Tadzhikistan.
