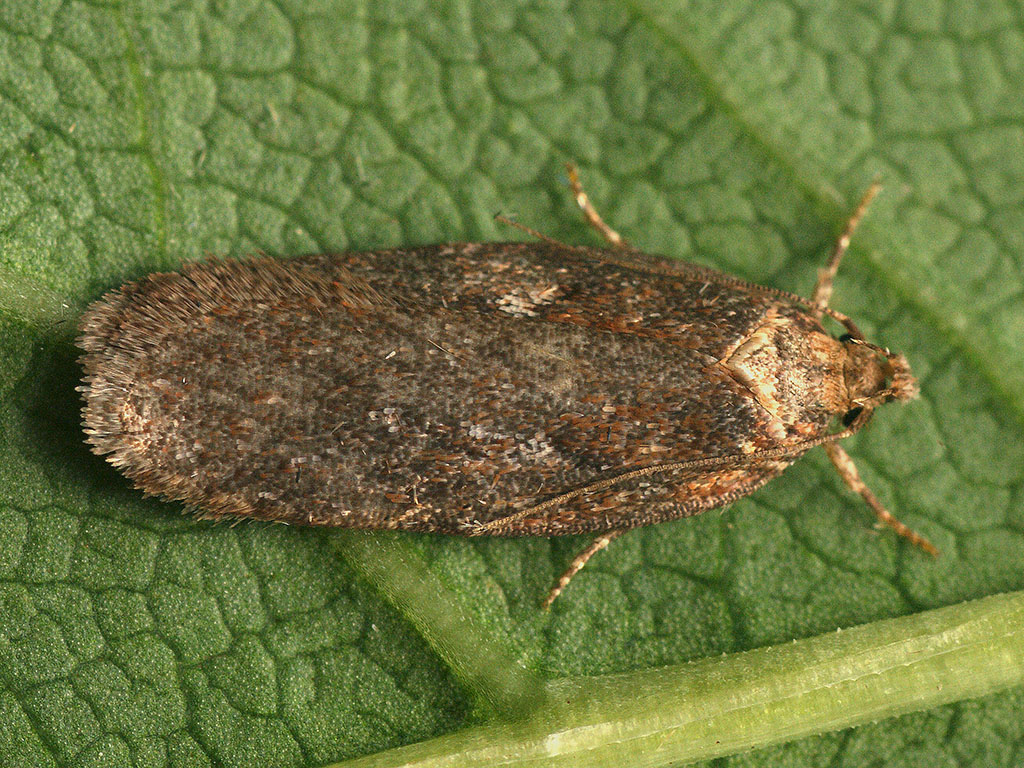
- Depressaria badiella Moscow oblast

Scientific classification
- Domain: Eukaryota
- Kingdom: Animalia
- Phylum: Arthropoda
- Class: Insecta
- Order: Lepidoptera
- Family: Depressariidae
- Genus: Depressaria
- Species: D. badiella

Binomial name
- Depressaria badiella (Hubner, 1796)

Synonyms
- List: Tinea badiella Hubner 1796; Depressaria brunneella Ragonot, 1874; Depressaria frigidella Turati, 1919; Depressaria frustratella Rebel, 1936; Depressaria badiella f. unicolor Tengström, 1869

= Depressaria badiella =

Species of moth

Depressaria badiella is a moth of the family Depressariidae. It is found in most of Europe, Libya, the Caucasus and Mongolia.

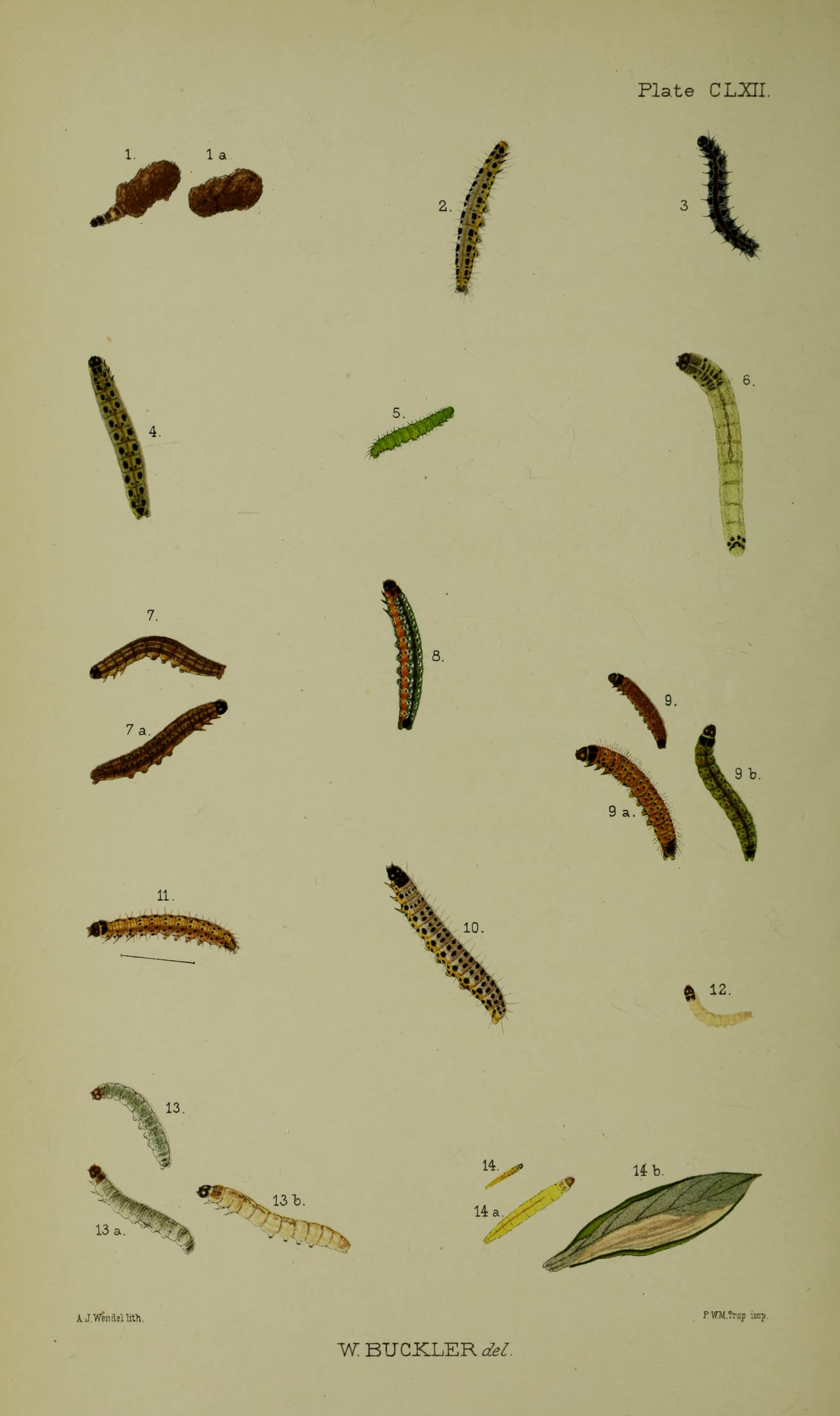
Fig. 9. 9a, 9b larvae in various stages of growth

== Description ==
The wingspan is 20–25 mm. The terminal joint of palpi with two black bands. Forewings are rather dark fuscous, somewhat whitish-sprinkled; a dark suffusion above dorsal dash; first discal stigma sometimes represented by an obscure dark fuscous dash, second cloudy, dark fuscous. Hindwings whitish-fuscous, becoming fuscous terminally. The larva is dull olive-green, often suffused with dark red; head dark red-brown; plate of 2 black, bisected, edged with pale yellowish anteriorly.

Adults are on wing from July to October in one generation per year and come to light.

The larvae feed on cat's ear (Hypochaeris radicata), perennial sow-thistle (Sonchus arvensis) and dandelion (Taraxacum species). They initially feed between spun leaves, but later amongst the roots of their host plant. Larvae can be found from May to July.

== Subspecies ==
- Depressaria badiella badiella
- Depressaria badiella frustratella Rebel, 1936 (Sardinia)
