= Depressaria beckmanni =

Scientific classification
- Kingdom: Animalia
- Phylum: Arthropoda
- Clade: Pancrustacea
- Class: Insecta
- Order: Lepidoptera
- Family: Depressariidae
- Genus: Depressaria
- Species: D. beckmanni

Binomial name
- Depressaria beckmanni Heinemann, 1870

Species of moth

Depressaria beckmanni is a moth of the family Depressariidae. It is found in Portugal, Spain, France, Germany, the Czech Republic, Slovakia, Austria, Switzerland, Italy, Finland, Serbia and Montenegro, Albania, North Macedonia and Greece.

The wingspan is 18–22 mm.

The larvae feed on the leaves of Pimpinella major.
