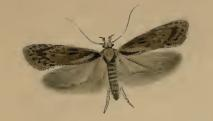

Scientific classification
- Domain: Eukaryota
- Kingdom: Animalia
- Phylum: Arthropoda
- Class: Insecta
- Order: Lepidoptera
- Family: Depressariidae
- Genus: Depressaria
- Species: D. artemisiae

Binomial name
- Depressaria artemisiae Nickerl, 1864

Synonyms
- Depressaria dracunculi Clarke, 1933

= Depressaria artemisiae =

Species of moth

Depressaria artemisiae is a moth of the family Depressariidae. It is found in most of Europe, except Ireland, Great Britain, the Netherlands, Belgium, the Iberian Peninsula and most of the Balkan Peninsula. It is also found in North America.

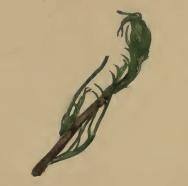
An apical shoot of Artemisia campestris inhabited by larva

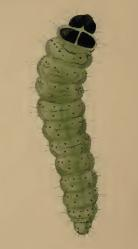
Larva

The wingspan is 15–19 mm. Adults are on wing in August and September.

The larvae feed on Artemisia campestris.
