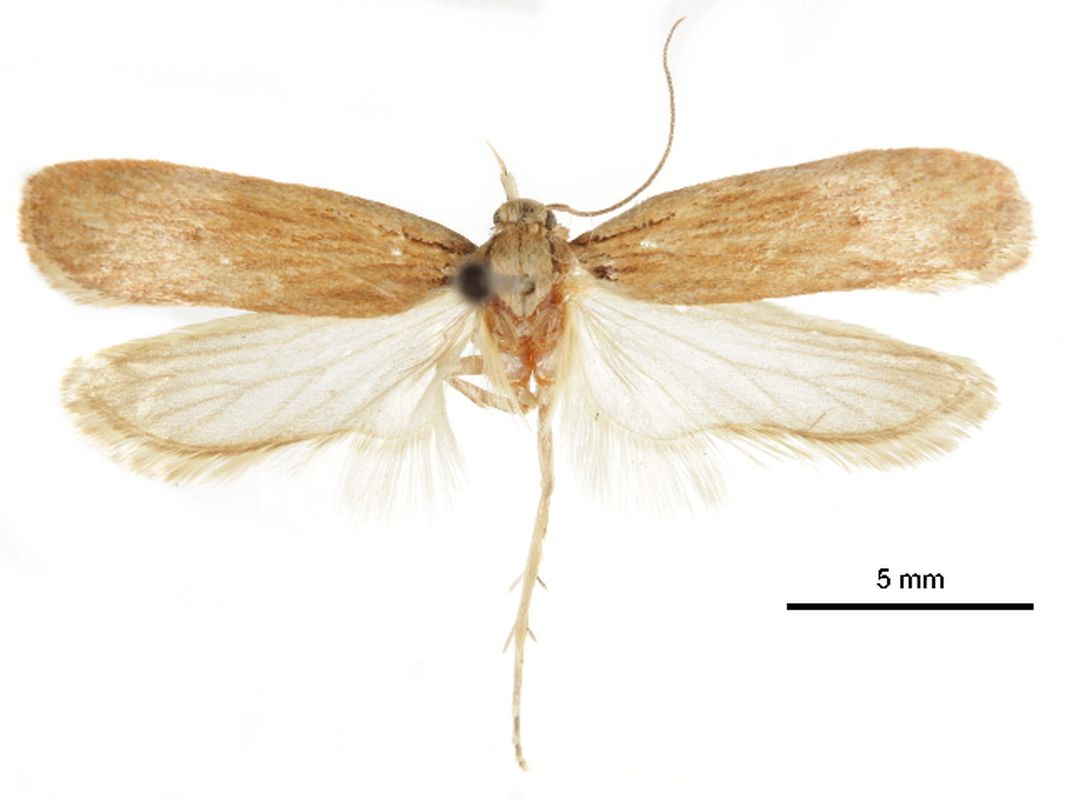

Scientific classification
- Kingdom: Animalia
- Phylum: Arthropoda
- Clade: Pancrustacea
- Class: Insecta
- Order: Lepidoptera
- Family: Depressariidae
- Genus: Depressaria
- Species: D. juliella

Binomial name
- Depressaria juliella Busck, 1908

= Depressaria juliella =

Species of moth

Depressaria juliella is a moth in the family Depressariidae. It was described by August Busck in 1908. It is found in North America, where it has been recorded from Washington, Oregon, Wyoming, Utah and New Mexico.

The wingspan is 21–25 mm. The forewings are light ochreous suffused and mottled with red. There is a reddish-fuscous streak from the base of the costa, following the fold, to about the basal fourth and there is a small reddish-fuscous patch in the anal angle. Both these dark markings are mixed with black scales. There are white scales along the costa and inner margin and in the apical third and all the veins are indicated by reddish fuscous and black mixed. The discal spot at the end of the cell is faintly indicated by a few red scales. The hindwings are fuscous, but lighter basally.

The larvae feed on Cicuta occidentals and Cicuta maculata.
