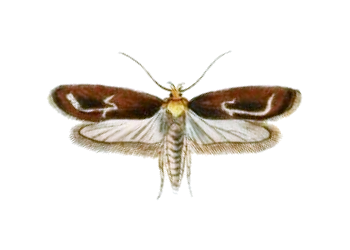
- Purple carrot-seed moth imago (Depressaria depressana)

Scientific classification
- Kingdom: Animalia
- Phylum: Arthropoda
- Clade: Pancrustacea
- Class: Insecta
- Order: Lepidoptera
- Family: Depressariidae
- Subfamily: Depressariinae
- Genus: Depressaria; Haworth, 1811

Type species
- "Phalaena heraclei" sensu Haworth, 1811

Synonyms
- Depressia (lapsus); Hasenfussia Fetz, 1994 (but see text); Piesta Billberg, 1820; Schistodepressaria Spuler, 1910; Siganorosis Wallengren, 1881; Volucra Latreille, 1829 (unjustified emendation); Volucrum Berthold, 1827

= Depressaria =

Genus of moths

Depressaria is a genus of moths in the superfamily Gelechioidea. It is the type genus of subfamily Depressariinae, which is often – particularly in older treatments – considered a distinct family Depressariidae or included in the Elachistidae, but actually seems to belong in the Oecophoridae.

The genus' type species is the parsnip moth. Its scientific name has been much confused for about 200 years. Adrian Hardy Haworth, on establishing the genus Depressaria in his 1811 issues of Lepidoptera Britannica, called the eventual type species Phalaena heraclei, an unjustified emendation of P. (Tortrix) heracliana. In this he followed such entomologists of his time as Anders Jahan Retzius, who in 1783 had believed the parsnip moth to be a species originally described by Carl Linnaeus in 1758. But in fact, this was a misidentification; Linnaeus' moth was actually the one known today as Agonopterix heracliana. John Curtis also popularized another incorrect spelling, D. heracleana, apparently first introduced (as Pyralis heracleana) by Johan Christian Fabricius in his 1775 Systema Entomologiae.

== Species ==
New species of Depressaria continue to be discovered and described. Known species include:

- Depressaria absynthiella Herrich-Schäffer, 1865
- Depressaria adustatella Turati, 1927
- Depressaria albipunctella (Denis & Schiffermüller, 1775) (= D. aegopodiella, D. albipuncta)
- Depressaria alienella Busck, 1904 (= D. corystopa, D. nymphidia)
- Depressaria altaica Zeller, 1854
- Depressaria angelicivora Clarke, 1952
- Depressaria angustati Clarke, 1941
- Depressaria armata Clarke, 1952
- Depressaria artemisiae Nickerl, 1864 (= D. dracunculi)
- Depressaria artemisiella McDunnough, 1927
- Depressaria assalella Chrétien, 1915
- Depressaria atrostrigella Clarke, 1941
- Depressaria basicostata Matsumura, 1931
- Depressaria badiella (Hübner, 1796)
- Depressaria beckmanni Heinemann, 1870
- Depressaria besma Clarke, 1947
- Depressaria betina Clarke, 1947
- Depressaria bupleurella Heinemann, 1870
- Depressaria cervicella Herrich-Schäffer, 1854
- Depressaria chaerophylli Zeller, 1839
- Depressaria chlorothorax Meyrick, 1921
- Depressaria cinderella Corley, 2002
- Depressaria cinereocostella Clemens, 1864 (= D. clausella)
- Depressaria clausulata Meyrick, 1911
- Depressaria colossella Caradja, 1920
- Depressaria compactella Caradja, 1920
- Depressaria constancei Clarke, 1947
- Depressaria corticinella Zeller, 1854
- Depressaria danilevskyi Lvovsky, 1981
- Depressaria daucella (Denis & Schiffermüller, 1775) (= D. apiella, D. nervosa (sensu auct. non Haworth, 1811: misidentified), D. rubricella)
- Depressaria daucivorella Ragonot, 1889
- Depressaria depressana – purple carrot-seed moth
- Depressaria despoliatella Erschoff, 1874
- Depressaria deverrella Chrétien, 1915
- Depressaria dictamnella (Treitschke, 1835)
- Depressaria discipunctella Herrich-Schäffer, 1854
- Depressaria djakonovi Lvovsky, 1981
- Depressaria douglasella Stainton, 1849
- Depressaria eleanorae Clarke, 1941
- Depressaria emeritella Stainton, 1849
- Depressaria erinaceella Staudinger, 1870
- Depressaria eryngiella Millière, 1881
- Depressaria erzurumella Lvovsky, 1996
- Depressaria filipjevi Lvovsky, 1981
- Depressaria floridella Mann, 1864
- Depressaria fuscipedella Chrétien, 1915
- Depressaria fusconigerella Hanneman, 1990
- Depressaria fuscovirgatella Hannemann, 1967
- Depressaria gallicella Chrétien, 1908
- Depressaria genistella Walsingham, 1903
- Depressaria halophilella Chrétien, 1908
- Depressaria hannemanniana Lvovsky, 1990
- Depressaria heydenii Zeller, 1854
- Depressaria hofmanni Stainton, 1861
- Depressaria hystricella Moschler, 1860
- Depressaria hirtipalpis Zeller, 1854
- Depressaria illepida Hannemann, 1958
- Depressaria incognitella Hannemann, 1990
- Depressaria indecorella Rebel, 1917
- Depressaria indelibatella Hannemann, 1971
- Depressaria irregularis Matsumura, 1931
- Depressaria ivinskisi Lvovsky, 1990
- Depressaria jugurthella (Lucas, 1849)
- Depressaria juliella Busck, 1908
- Depressaria kailai Lvovsky, 2009
- Depressaria karmeliella Amsel, 1935
- Depressaria kasyi Hannemann, 1976
- Depressaria krasnowodskella Hannemann, 1953
- Depressaria kondarella Lvovsky, 1981
- Depressaria lacticapitella Klimesch, 1942
- Depressaria latisquamella Chrétien, 1922
- Depressaria leptotaeniae Clarke, 1933
- Depressaria leucocephala Snellen, 1884
- Depressaria libanotidella Schläger, 1849
- Depressaria longipennella Lvovsky, 1981
- Depressaria macrotrichella Rebel, 1917
- Depressaria manglisiella Lvovsky, 1981
- Depressaria marcella Rebel, 1901
- Depressaria millefoliella Chrétien, 1908
- Depressaria moranella Chrétien, 1907
- Depressaria moya Clarke, 1947
- Depressaria multifidae Clarke, 1933
- Depressaria nemolella Svensson, 1982
- Depressaria niphosyrphas Meyrick, 1931
- Depressaria nomia Butler, 1879
- Depressaria olerella Zeller, 1854
- Depressaria orthobathra Meyrick, 1918
- Depressaria palousella Clarke, 1941
- Depressaria peniculatella Turati, 1922
- Depressaria panurga Meyrick, 1920
- Depressaria parahofmanni Hannemann, 1958
- Depressaria pentheri Rebel, 1904
- Depressaria peregrinella Hannemann, 1967
- Depressaria petronoma Meyrick, 1934
- Depressaria pimpinellae Zeller, 1839
- Depressaria platytaeniella Hannemann, 1977
- Depressaria prospicua Meyrick, 1914
- Depressaria pteryxiphaga Clarke, 1952
- Depressaria pulcherrimella Stainton, 1849
- Depressaria pyrenaella Sumpich, 2013
- Depressaria radiella (Goeze, 1783) – parsnip moth (= D. heracleana, D. heraclei, D. heracliana (sensu auct. non (Linnaeus, 1758): misidentified), D. ontariella, D. pastinacella)
- Depressaria radiosquamella Walsingham, 1898
- Depressaria rhodoscelis Meyrick, 1920
- Depressaria rjabovi Lvovsky, 1990
- Depressaria rubripalpella Chrétien, 1922
- Depressaria ruticola Christoph, 1873
- Depressaria schaidurovi Lvovsky, 1981
- Depressaria schellbachi Clarke, 1947
- Depressaria sibirella Lvovsky, 1981
- Depressaria silesiaca Heinemann, 1870
- Depressaria sordidatella Tengström, 1848 (= D. weirella)
- Depressaria spectrocentra Meyrick, 1935
- Depressaria subalbipunctella Lvovsky, 1981
- Depressaria subhirtipalpis Hannemann, 1958
- Depressaria subnervosa Oberthür, 1888
- Depressaria tenebricosa Zeller, 1854
- Depressaria togata Walsingham, 1889 (= D. thustra)
- Depressaria ultimella Stainton, 1849
- Depressaria ululana Rössler, 1866
- Depressaria varzobella Lvovsky, 1982
- Depressaria velox Staudinger, 1859
- Depressaria veneficella Zeller, 1847
- Depressaria venustella Hannemann, 1990
- Depressaria whitmani Clarke, 1941
- Depressaria yakimae Clarke, 1941
- Depressaria zelleri Staudinger, 1879

Some other Oecophoridae were formerly included here, among them close relatives of the present genus (e.g. Psorosticha zizyphi and many species of Agonopterix), as well as more distantly related taxa (e.g. Ironopolia sobriella). Horridopalpus is sometimes still included in Depressaria as a subgenus (namely by sources that uprank Depressariinae to full family status), but may be a far more distant relative. The members of the proposed subgenus Hasenfussia are tentatively retained here on the other hand, but their relationship to other Depressaria requires further study.

== Unknown and undescribed species ==
- Depressaria albiocellata Staudinger, 1871, described from Greece
- Depressaria aurantiella Tutt, 1893, described from Great Britain
- Depressaria kollari Zeller, 1854, described from Australia
- Depressaria pavoniella (Amary, 1840) (Oecophora), described from France
- Depressaria reticulatella Bruand, 1851, described from France
- Depressaria sp. A 'Wyoming-California'
- Depressaria sp. B 'Modoc County, California'

== Former species ==
- Depressaria tabghaella Amsel, 1935
