= Depressaria armata =

Scientific classification
- Domain: Eukaryota
- Kingdom: Animalia
- Phylum: Arthropoda
- Class: Insecta
- Order: Lepidoptera
- Family: Depressariidae
- Genus: Depressaria
- Species: D. armata

Binomial name
- Depressaria armata Clarke, 1952

Species of moth

Depressaria armata is a moth in the family Depressariidae. It was described by Clarke in 1952. It is found in North America, where it has been recorded from Oregon and Washington.

The larvae feed on Lomatium brandegei.
