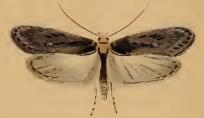

Scientific classification
- Kingdom: Animalia
- Phylum: Arthropoda
- Clade: Pancrustacea
- Class: Insecta
- Order: Lepidoptera
- Family: Depressariidae
- Genus: Depressaria
- Species: D. hofmanni

Binomial name
- Depressaria hofmanni Stainton, 1861

= Depressaria hofmanni =

Species of moth

Depressaria hofmanni is a moth of the family Depressariidae. It is found from France and Spain to Poland and Romania and from Germany to Italy and Austria. It has also been recorded from Greece and Russia.

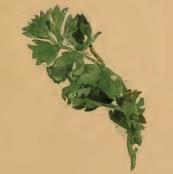
A leaf of Seseli libanotis with a larval web

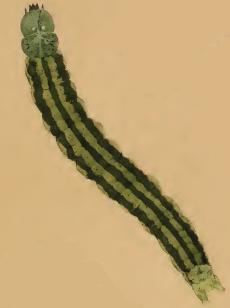
Larva

The larvae feed on Seseli libanotis.
