= Depressaria longipennella =

Scientific classification
- Kingdom: Animalia
- Phylum: Arthropoda
- Clade: Pancrustacea
- Class: Insecta
- Order: Lepidoptera
- Family: Depressariidae
- Genus: Depressaria
- Species: D. longipennella

Binomial name
- Depressaria longipennella Lvovsky, 1981

Species of moth

Depressaria longipennella is a moth in the family Depressariidae. It was described by Alexandr L. Lvovsky in 1981. It is found in Turkmenistan.
