= Depressaria hirtipalpis =

Scientific classification
- Kingdom: Animalia
- Phylum: Arthropoda
- Clade: Pancrustacea
- Class: Insecta
- Order: Lepidoptera
- Family: Depressariidae
- Genus: Depressaria
- Species: D. hirtipalpis

Binomial name
- Depressaria hirtipalpis Zeller, 1854

Synonyms
- Hasenfussia hirtipalpis

Species of moth

Depressaria hirtipalpis is a moth of the family Depressariidae. It is found in Spain, Croatia, North Macedonia and Turkey.

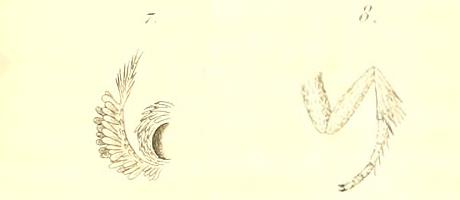
Illustration of the head and a leg

The larvae feed on Salvia officinalis.
