= Depressaria cinderella =

Scientific classification
- Domain: Eukaryota
- Kingdom: Animalia
- Phylum: Arthropoda
- Class: Insecta
- Order: Lepidoptera
- Family: Depressariidae
- Genus: Depressaria
- Species: D. cinderella

Binomial name
- Depressaria cinderella Corley, 2002

Species of moth

Depressaria cinderella is a moth of the family Depressariidae which is endemic to Portugal.

The larvae feed on Conopodium capillifolium.
