= Depressaria pteryxiphaga =

Scientific classification
- Domain: Eukaryota
- Kingdom: Animalia
- Phylum: Arthropoda
- Class: Insecta
- Order: Lepidoptera
- Family: Depressariidae
- Genus: Depressaria
- Species: D. pteryxiphaga

Binomial name
- Depressaria pteryxiphaga Clarke, 1952

Species of moth

Depressaria pteryxiphaga is a moth in the family Depressariidae. It was described by Clarke in 1952. It is found in North America, where it has been recorded from Wyoming and Utah.

The larvae feed on Preryxia terebinthina.
