= Depressaria togata =

Scientific classification
- Domain: Eukaryota
- Kingdom: Animalia
- Phylum: Arthropoda
- Class: Insecta
- Order: Lepidoptera
- Family: Depressariidae
- Genus: Depressaria
- Species: D. togata

Binomial name
- Depressaria togata Walsingham, 1889

Synonyms
- Depressaria thustra Clarke, 1947

Species of moth

Depressaria togata is a moth in the family Depressariidae. It was described by Lord Walsingham in 1889. It is found in North America, where it has been recorded from Montana, from British Columbia to Arizona and in Oregon and Washington.

The wingspan is about 20 mm. The forewings are pale greyish ochreous, thickly suffused and streaked with purplish fuscous. The markings are ill-defined and consist of a dark fuscous patch at the base of the dorsal margin, a dash of the same colour immediately above the middle of the wing at one third from the base, followed by some pale greyish-ochreous scales, as well as a pale greyish-ochreous spot on the middle of the wing at about the end of the cell, preceded and followed by fuscous scales. Beyond and above this are several fuscous dashes radiating outwards to the costal and to the upper half of the apical margin, where a row of obscure fuscous spots is found. The hindwings are pale shining whitish grey.

The larvae feed on Lomatium ambiguum, Lomatium triternatum macrocarpum, Lomatium togata, Lomatium brandegei, Perideridia bolanderi and Preryxia terebenthina foeniculacea.
