= Depressaria despoliatella =

Scientific classification
- Domain: Eukaryota
- Kingdom: Animalia
- Phylum: Arthropoda
- Class: Insecta
- Order: Lepidoptera
- Family: Depressariidae
- Genus: Depressaria
- Species: D. despoliatella

Binomial name
- Depressaria despoliatella Erschoff, 1874

Species of moth

Depressaria despoliatella is a moth in the family Depressariidae. It was described by Nikolay Grigoryevich Erschoff in 1874. It is found in Turkmenistan.
