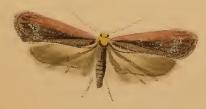

Scientific classification
- Domain: Eukaryota
- Kingdom: Animalia
- Phylum: Arthropoda
- Class: Insecta
- Order: Lepidoptera
- Family: Depressariidae
- Genus: Depressaria
- Species: D. depressana

Binomial name
- Depressaria depressana (Fabricius, 1775)

Synonyms
- Depressaria depressella (Fabricius, 1798); Depressaria bluntii Curtis, 1829; Pyralis depressana Fabricius, 1775; Tinea depressella Fabricius, 1798; Depressaria rhodochlora Meyrick, 1923; Depressaria depressella var. amasiella Staudinger, 1879; Depressaria depressella var. prangosella Walsingham, 1903

= Depressaria depressana =

Species of moth

Depressaria depressana, Blunt's flat-body or the purple carrot-seed moth, is a moth of the family Depressariidae. It is found in most of Europe. It is also found in the Near East, North Africa, the eastern part of the Palearctic realm and since 2009 in North America.

The wingspan is 14–20 mm. Adults are on wing from March to May. There is one generation in the north. There are two generations in the northern Caucasus and up to three generations in the south of Ukraine.

The larvae feed on Daucus carota, Pimpinella, Pastinaca, Seseli and Peucedanum oreoselinum.

== Gallery ==
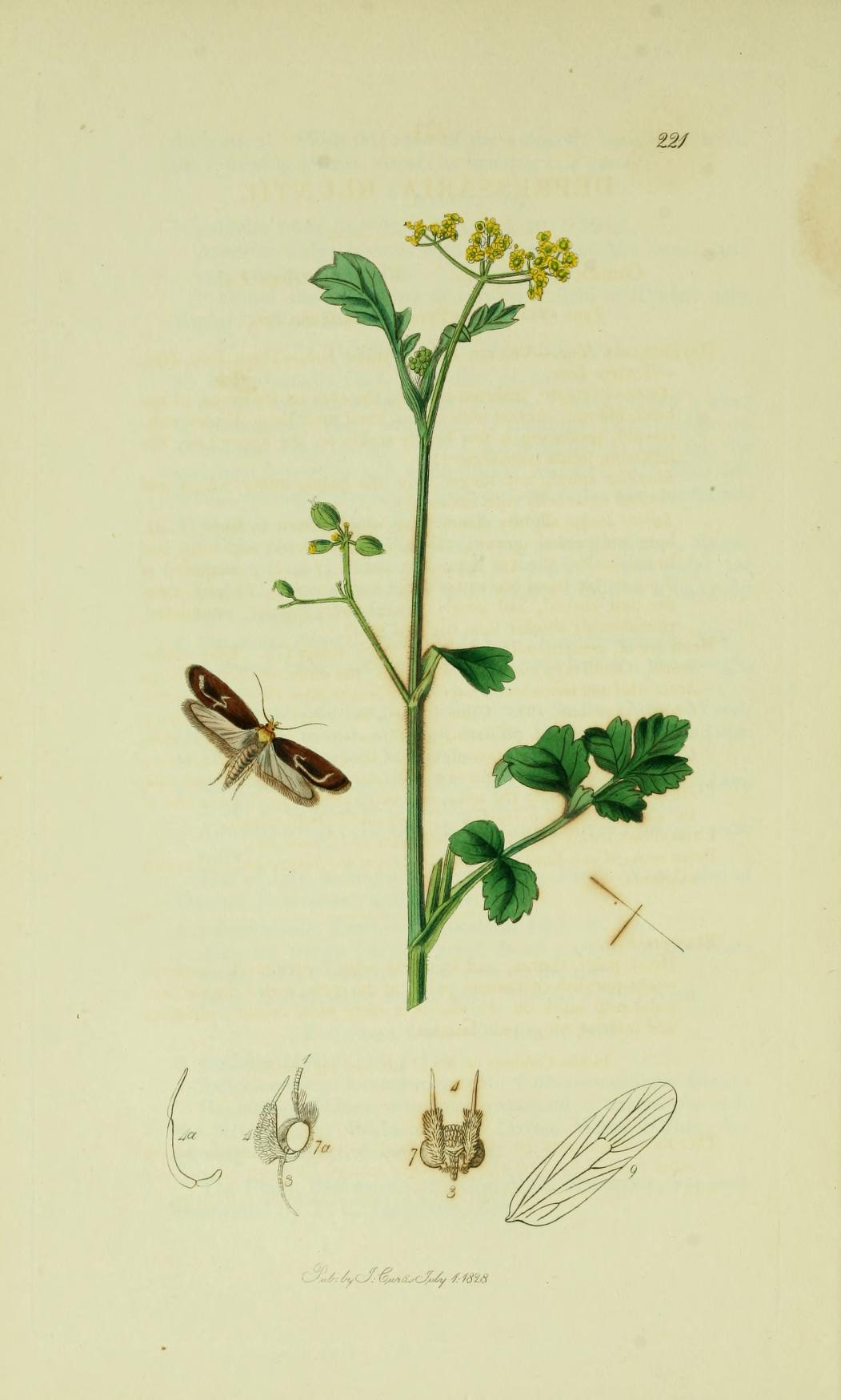
Illustration from John Curtis's British Entomology Volume 6

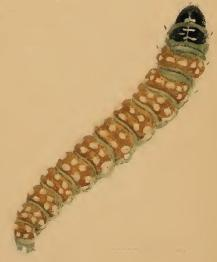
Larva

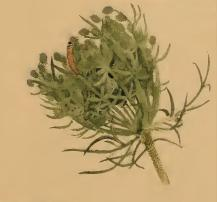
A carrot inflorescence inhabited by a larva
