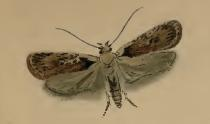

Scientific classification
- Kingdom: Animalia
- Phylum: Arthropoda
- Class: Insecta
- Order: Lepidoptera
- Family: Depressariidae
- Genus: Depressaria
- Species: D. ululana

Binomial name
- Depressaria ululana Rossler, 1866

= Depressaria ululana =

Species of moth

Depressaria ululana is a moth of the family Depressariidae. It is found in Spain, Portugal, France, Switzerland, Germany, Romania and North Macedonia.

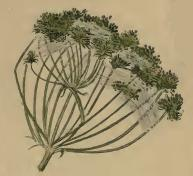
An umbel of Bunium bulbocastanum with larval webs

Larva

The larvae feed on the flowers and unripe seeds of Bunium persicum. The larvae can be found from the end of June to the beginning of July.
