= Depressaria fusconigerella =

Scientific classification
- Domain: Eukaryota
- Kingdom: Animalia
- Phylum: Arthropoda
- Class: Insecta
- Order: Lepidoptera
- Family: Depressariidae
- Genus: Depressaria
- Species: D. fusconigerella

Binomial name
- Depressaria fusconigerella Hanneman, 1990

Species of moth

Depressaria fusconigerella is a moth in the family Depressariidae. It was described by Hanneman in 1990.
