= Depressaria multifidae =

Scientific classification
- Domain: Eukaryota
- Kingdom: Animalia
- Phylum: Arthropoda
- Class: Insecta
- Order: Lepidoptera
- Family: Depressariidae
- Genus: Depressaria
- Species: D. multifidae

Binomial name
- Depressaria multifidae J. F. G. Clarke, 1933

Species of moth

Depressaria multifidae is a moth in the family Depressariidae. It was described by John Frederick Gates Clarke in 1933. It is found in North America, where it has been recorded from Oregon, Washington, Idaho and California.

The wingspan is 17–21 mm.

The larvae feed on Lomatium columbianum, Lomatium grayi and Pteryxia terebinthina.
