= Depressaria constancei =

Scientific classification
- Domain: Eukaryota
- Kingdom: Animalia
- Phylum: Arthropoda
- Class: Insecta
- Order: Lepidoptera
- Family: Depressariidae
- Genus: Depressaria
- Species: D. constancei

Binomial name
- Depressaria constancei Clarke, 1947

Species of moth

Depressaria constancei is a moth in the family Depressariidae. It was described by Clarke in 1947. It is found in North America, where it has been recorded from Oregon and California.

The larvae feed on Lomatium californicum.
