= Depressaria adustatella =

Scientific classification
- Domain: Eukaryota
- Kingdom: Animalia
- Phylum: Arthropoda
- Class: Insecta
- Order: Lepidoptera
- Family: Depressariidae
- Genus: Depressaria
- Species: D. adustatella

Binomial name
- Depressaria adustatella Turati, 1927

Synonyms
- Depressaria delphinias Meyrick, 1936; Depressaria subtenebricosa Hannemann, 1953

Species of moth

Depressaria adustatella is a moth of the family Depressariidae. It is found in France and on the Iberian Peninsula and Sardinia. It is also present in North Africa, where it has been recorded from Morocco, Algeria and Libya.
