= Depressaria panurga =

Scientific classification
- Kingdom: Animalia
- Phylum: Arthropoda
- Class: Insecta
- Order: Lepidoptera
- Family: Depressariidae
- Genus: Depressaria
- Species: D. panurga

Binomial name
- Depressaria panurga Meyrick, 1920

Species of moth

Depressaria panurga is a moth in the family Depressariidae. It was described by Edward Meyrick in 1920. It is found in South Africa.

The wingspan is about 17 mm. The forewings are brown suffused with fuscous except beneath the costa on the anterior half, and with rather dark purplish fuscous on the dorsal two-thirds, darkest towards the base. The costa is marked with small obscure dark fuscous spots or strigulae from the base to three-fourths. The discal stigmata are rather large and whitish, the first irregularly edged anteriorly with blackish suffusion or irroration, the second preceded by an irregular whitish dot or group of scales almost connected with it. The hindwings are light grey.
