= Depressaria genistella =

Scientific classification
- Domain: Eukaryota
- Kingdom: Animalia
- Phylum: Arthropoda
- Class: Insecta
- Order: Lepidoptera
- Family: Depressariidae
- Genus: Depressaria
- Species: D. genistella

Binomial name
- Depressaria genistella Walsingham, 1903

Species of moth

Depressaria genistella is a moth of the family Depressariidae. It is found in Spain.

The wingspan is about 22 mm. The forewings are pale mouse-grey and the hindwings are shining pale stone-grey.

The larvae feed on the flowers of Genista species, possibly Genista hispanica.
