= Depressaria platytaeniella =

Scientific classification
- Domain: Eukaryota
- Kingdom: Animalia
- Phylum: Arthropoda
- Class: Insecta
- Order: Lepidoptera
- Family: Depressariidae
- Genus: Depressaria
- Species: D. platytaeniella

Binomial name
- Depressaria platytaeniella Hanneman, 1977

Species of moth

Depressaria platytaeniella is a moth in the family Depressariidae. It was described by Hans-Joachim Hannemann in 1977. It is found in Afghanistan.
