= Depressaria spectrocentra =

Scientific classification
- Kingdom: Animalia
- Phylum: Arthropoda
- Class: Insecta
- Order: Lepidoptera
- Family: Depressariidae
- Genus: Depressaria
- Species: D. spectrocentra

Binomial name
- Depressaria spectrocentra Meyrick, 1935

Species of moth

Depressaria spectrocentra is a moth in the family Depressariidae. It was described by Edward Meyrick in 1935. It is found in Japan.
