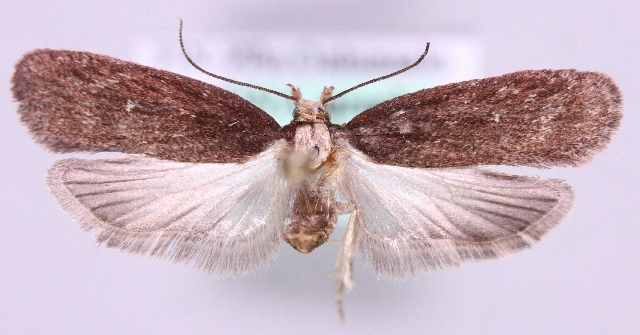

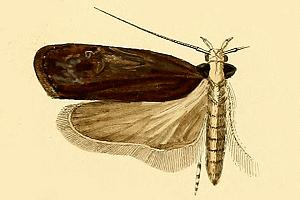

Scientific classification
- Domain: Eukaryota
- Kingdom: Animalia
- Phylum: Arthropoda
- Class: Insecta
- Order: Lepidoptera
- Family: Depressariidae
- Genus: Depressaria
- Species: D. leucocephala

Binomial name
- Depressaria leucocephala Snellen, 1884

Synonyms
- Depressaria thomanniella Rebel, 1917; Depressaria urzhunella Krulikovsky, 1909

= Depressaria leucocephala =

Species of moth

Depressaria leucocephala is a moth of the family Depressariidae. It is found in Fennoscandia, the Baltic region, Russia, Austria, Switzerland and Italy.

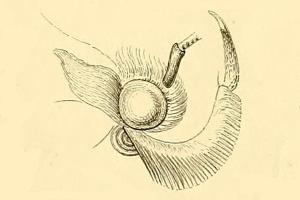
Close-up of the head

The wingspan is about 20 mm. Adults are on wing from June to September.

The larvae feed on Artemisia vulgaris.
