= Depressaria deverrella =

Scientific classification
- Kingdom: Animalia
- Phylum: Arthropoda
- Clade: Pancrustacea
- Class: Insecta
- Order: Lepidoptera
- Family: Depressariidae
- Genus: Depressaria
- Species: D. deverrella

Binomial name
- Depressaria deverrella Chrétien, 1915

Synonyms
- Depressaria duplicatella Chretien, 1915

Species of moth

Depressaria deverrella is a moth of the family Depressariidae. It is found in Algeria and France.

The wingspan is 15–19 mm.

The larvae feed on the flowers of Deverra scoparia and Deverra tortuosa.
