= Depressaria subnervosa =

Scientific classification
- Kingdom: Animalia
- Phylum: Arthropoda
- Clade: Pancrustacea
- Class: Insecta
- Order: Lepidoptera
- Family: Depressariidae
- Genus: Depressaria
- Species: D. subnervosa

Binomial name
- Depressaria subnervosa Oberthür, 1888

Species of moth

Depressaria subnervosa is a moth in the family Depressariidae. It was described by Charles Oberthür in 1888. It is found in Algeria.
