= Depressaria peregrinella =

Scientific classification
- Domain: Eukaryota
- Kingdom: Animalia
- Phylum: Arthropoda
- Class: Insecta
- Order: Lepidoptera
- Family: Depressariidae
- Genus: Depressaria
- Species: D. peregrinella

Binomial name
- Depressaria peregrinella Hanneman, 1967

Species of moth

Depressaria peregrinella is a moth in the family Depressariidae. It was described by Hans-Joachim Hannemann in 1967. It is found in Iran.
