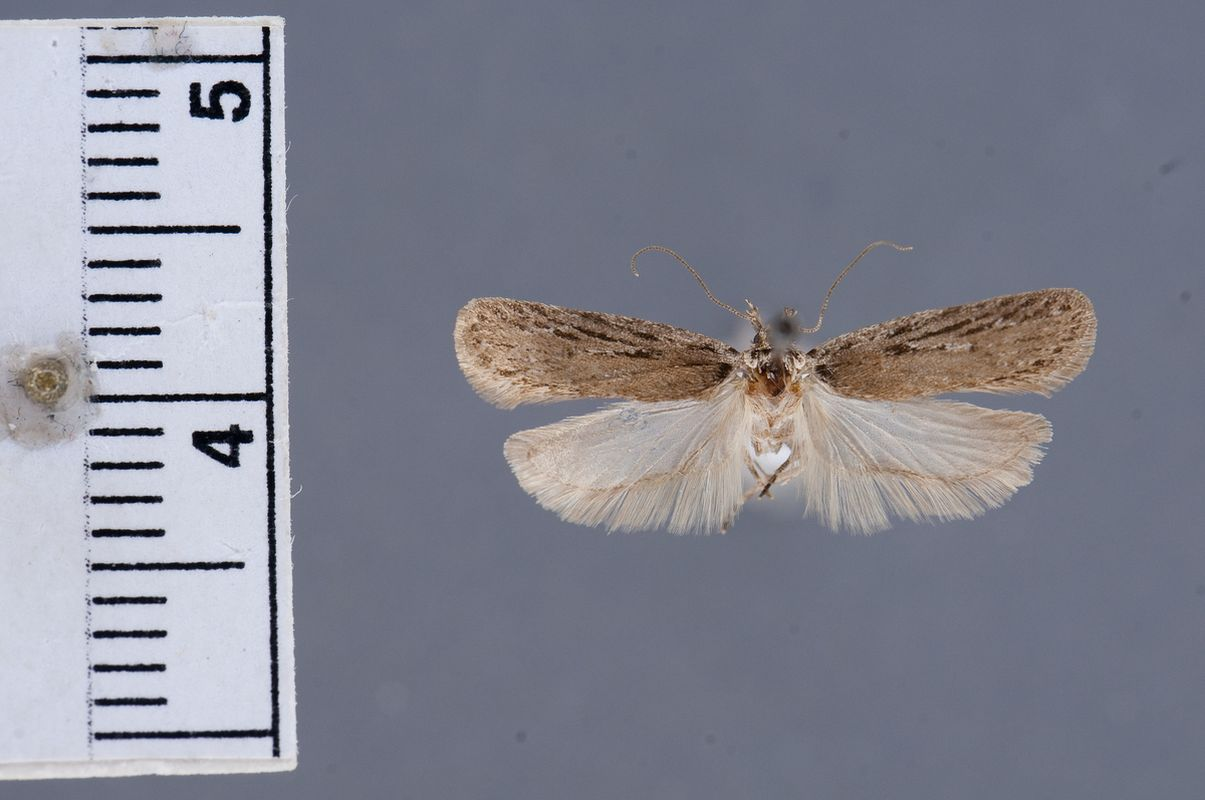

Scientific classification
- Kingdom: Animalia
- Phylum: Arthropoda
- Clade: Pancrustacea
- Class: Insecta
- Order: Lepidoptera
- Family: Depressariidae
- Genus: Depressaria
- Species: D. palousella

Binomial name
- Depressaria palousella J. F. G. Clarke, 1941

= Depressaria palousella =

Species of moth

Depressaria palousella is a moth in the family Depressariidae. It was described by John Frederick Gates Clarke in 1941. It is known from Washington, Western North America.

== Description ==
The wingspan is 19–20 mm. The base of the forewings is black, the costa is marked with cinereous (ash gray) to the middle. The ground color is light brownish fuscous, darker basally and faintly irrorated (sprinkled) with cinereous. There is a strongly marked, longitudinal black dash in the cell, edged anteriorly with cinereous. There is a series of indistinct, blackish spots around the termen at the ends of the veins. The hindwings are light grayish-fuscous but darker at the apex and around the termen.
