= Depressaria latisquamella =

Scientific classification
- Domain: Eukaryota
- Kingdom: Animalia
- Phylum: Arthropoda
- Class: Insecta
- Order: Lepidoptera
- Family: Depressariidae
- Genus: Depressaria
- Species: D. latisquamella

Binomial name
- Depressaria latisquamella Chrétien, 1922

Species of moth

Depressaria latisquamella is a moth in the family Depressariidae. It was described by Pierre Chrétien in 1922. It is found in Morocco.
