= Depressaria douglasella =

Scientific classification
- Kingdom: Animalia
- Phylum: Arthropoda
- Clade: Pancrustacea
- Class: Insecta
- Order: Lepidoptera
- Family: Depressariidae
- Genus: Depressaria
- Species: D. douglasella

Binomial name
- Depressaria douglasella Stainton, 1849

Synonyms
- Depressaria miserella Herrich-Schäffer, 1855; Depressaria thoracella Müller-Rutz, 1922

Species of moth

Depressaria douglasella is a moth of the family Depressariidae. It is found in most of Europe.

The wingspan is 17–20 mm. The head and thorax are whitish, patagia fuscous. Terminal joint of palpi with two black bands. Forewings are brown, more or less mixed with dark fuscous and whitish, costal edge rosy -tinged; some inconspicuous darker dashes; first and second discal stigmata whitish, connected by a dark dash, first preceded by an oblique dark fuscous dash; an obscure paler angulated fascia about 2/3 Hindwings are whitish-grey, darker posteriorly. The larva is green; dorsal and subdorsal lines darker; head yellowish-green.

Adults are on wing from July to September in one generation per year.

The larvae feed on Daucus, Anthriscus, Seseli, Carum and Pastinaca species.
