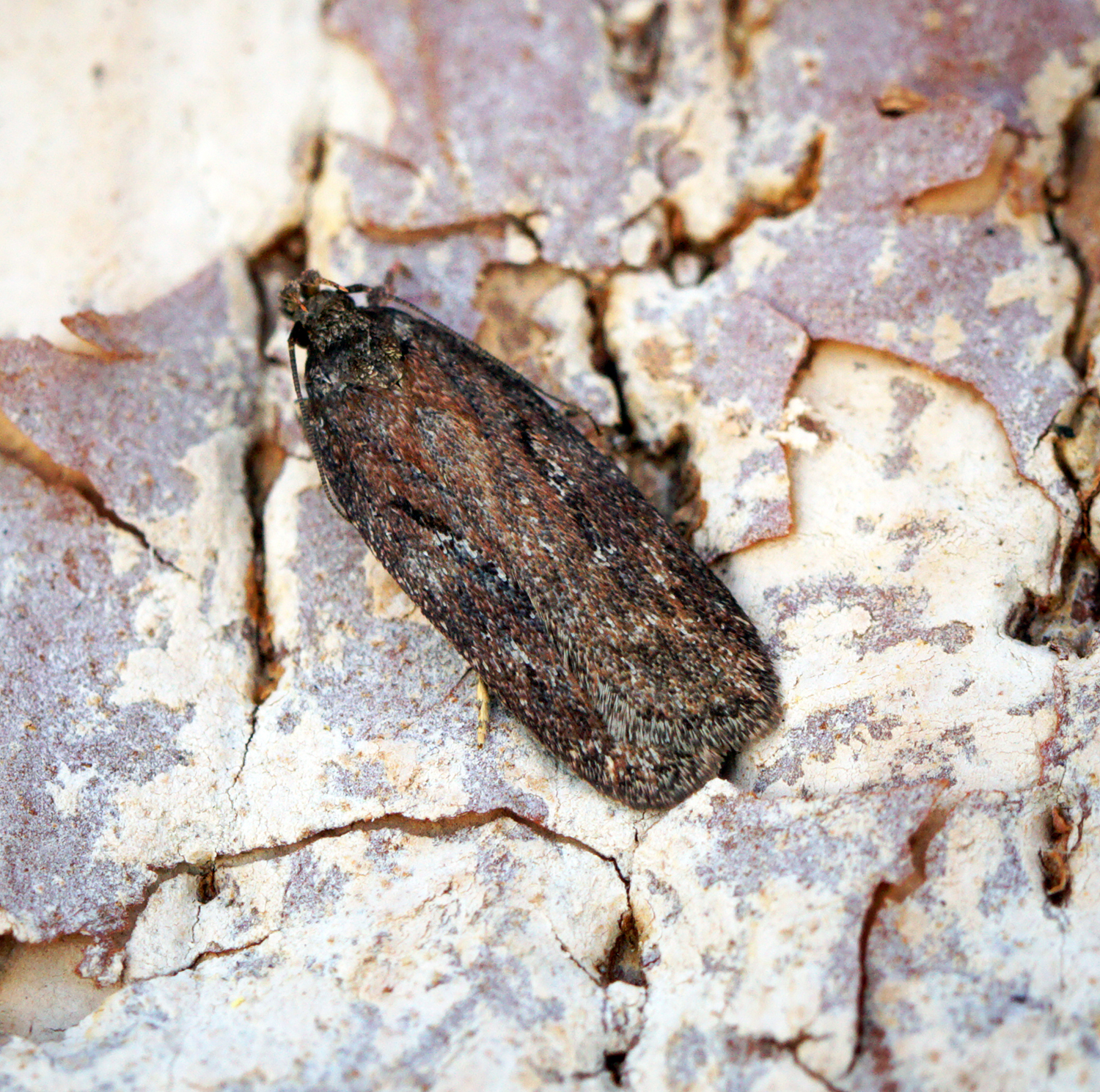

Scientific classification
- Domain: Eukaryota
- Kingdom: Animalia
- Phylum: Arthropoda
- Class: Insecta
- Order: Lepidoptera
- Family: Depressariidae
- Genus: Depressaria
- Species: D. sordidatella

Binomial name
- Depressaria sordidatella Tengstrom, 1848

Synonyms
- Depressaria gudmanni Rebel, 1927; Depressaria larseniana Strand, 1927; Depressaria weirella Stainton, 1849

= Depressaria sordidatella =

Species of moth

Depressaria sordidatella is a moth of the family Depressariidae. It is found in most of Europe, except Ireland, Portugal, Belgium, Ukraine and most of the Balkan Peninsula.

The wingspan is 18–22 mm. Adults are on wing from July to August in one generation per year.

The larvae feed on Anthriscus, Angelica, Peucedanum, Aegopodium, Pastinaca, Chaerophyllum and Heracleum sphondylium. They live between leaves spun together with silk.
