= Depressaria venustella =

Scientific classification
- Kingdom: Animalia
- Phylum: Arthropoda
- Clade: Pancrustacea
- Class: Insecta
- Order: Lepidoptera
- Family: Depressariidae
- Genus: Depressaria
- Species: D. venustella

Binomial name
- Depressaria venustella Hannemann, 1990

Species of moth

Depressaria venustella is a moth of the family Depressariidae. It is found on Sicily.
