= Depressaria moranella =

Scientific classification
- Kingdom: Animalia
- Phylum: Arthropoda
- Class: Insecta
- Order: Lepidoptera
- Family: Depressariidae
- Genus: Depressaria
- Species: D. moranella

Binomial name
- Depressaria moranella Chrétien, 1907

Synonyms
- Horridopalpus moranella; Depressaria moranellus; Depressaria arabica Amsel, 1972

Species of moth

Depressaria moranella is a moth of the family Depressariidae. It is found in Algeria and North Macedonia.

The wingspan is 16–18 mm.

The larvae feed on Hoplophyllum tuberculatum.
