= Depressaria moya =

Scientific classification
- Kingdom: Animalia
- Phylum: Arthropoda
- Clade: Pancrustacea
- Class: Insecta
- Order: Lepidoptera
- Family: Depressariidae
- Genus: Depressaria
- Species: D. moya

Binomial name
- Depressaria moya Clarke, 1947

Species of moth

Depressaria moya is a moth in the family Depressariidae. It was described by Clarke in 1947. It is found in North America, where it has been recorded from California.

The wingspan is 18–19 mm.

The larvae feed on Lomatium vaginatum.
