= Depressaria corticinella =

Scientific classification
- Kingdom: Animalia
- Phylum: Arthropoda
- Clade: Pancrustacea
- Class: Insecta
- Order: Lepidoptera
- Family: Depressariidae
- Genus: Depressaria
- Species: D. corticinella

Binomial name
- Depressaria corticinella Zeller, 1854

Synonyms
- Depressaria uhrykella Fuchs, 1903

Species of moth

Depressaria corticinella is a moth of the family Depressariidae. It is found in France, Spain, Hungary, Romania and Turkey.
