= Depressaria lacticapitella =

Scientific classification
- Kingdom: Animalia
- Phylum: Arthropoda
- Clade: Pancrustacea
- Class: Insecta
- Order: Lepidoptera
- Family: Depressariidae
- Genus: Depressaria
- Species: D. lacticapitella

Binomial name
- Depressaria lacticapitella Klimesch, 1942

Species of moth

Depressaria lacticapitella is a moth of the family Depressariidae. It is found in Austria.

The wingspan is 22–24 mm.

The larvae feed on Athamanta cretensis.
