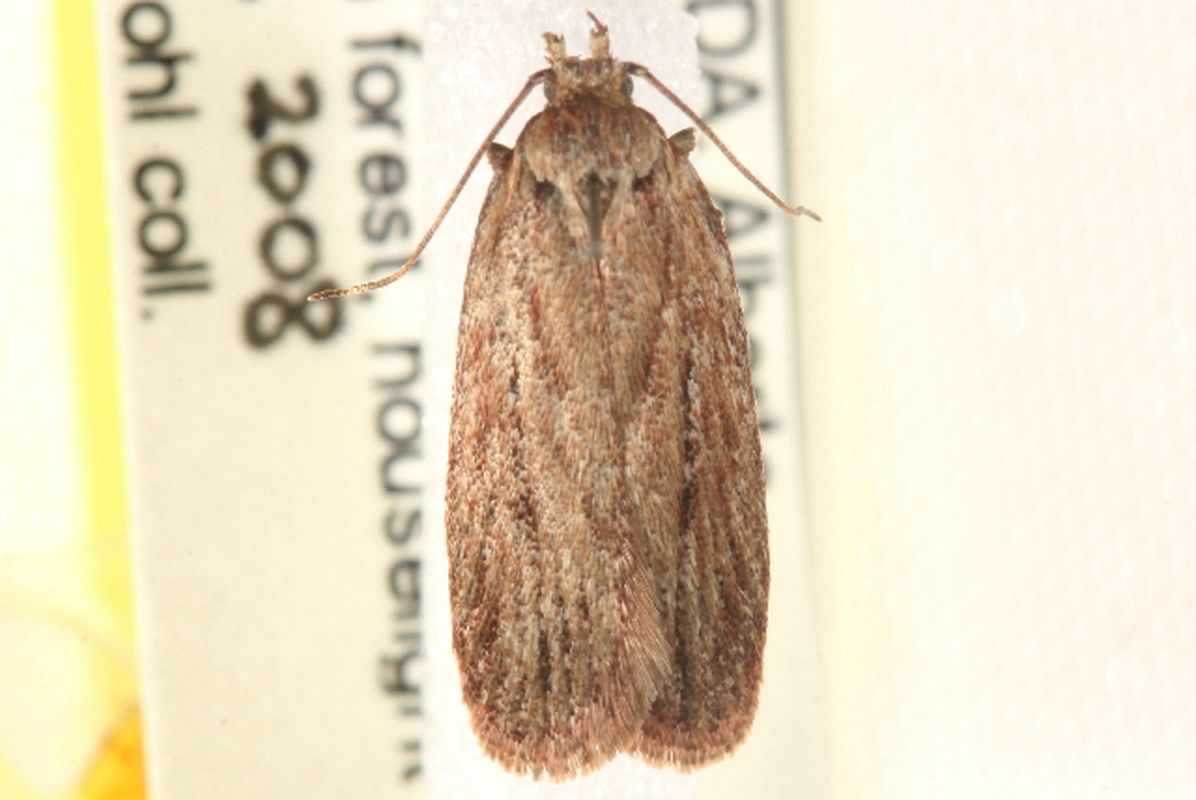

Scientific classification
- Kingdom: Animalia
- Phylum: Arthropoda
- Clade: Pancrustacea
- Class: Insecta
- Order: Lepidoptera
- Family: Depressariidae
- Genus: Depressaria
- Species: D. eleanorae

Binomial name
- Depressaria eleanorae J. F. G. Clarke, 1941

= Depressaria eleanorae =

Species of moth

Depressaria eleanorae is a moth in the family Depressariidae. It was described by John Frederick Gates Clarke in 1941. It is found in North America, where it has been recorded from Alberta, Ontario and in Maine.

The wingspan is 18–20 mm. The forewings are ochreous overlaid with red, reddish fuscous and white scales. There is a black spot at the base of the wing on the costa and a similar one on the dorsum. The wing is narrowly but strongly tinged with bright red. There is an indistinct longitudinal streak of mixed reddish fuscous and white scales in the middle of the cell. The hindwings are light fuscous, but lighter basally and with a distinct reddish hue.
