= Depressaria subalbipunctella =

Scientific classification
- Kingdom: Animalia
- Phylum: Arthropoda
- Clade: Pancrustacea
- Class: Insecta
- Order: Lepidoptera
- Family: Depressariidae
- Genus: Depressaria
- Species: D. subalbipunctella

Binomial name
- Depressaria subalbipunctella Lvovsky, 1981

Species of moth

Depressaria subalbipunctella is a moth of the family Depressariidae. It is found in Russia and Ukraine.
