= Depressaria ruticola =

Scientific classification
- Kingdom: Animalia
- Phylum: Arthropoda
- Class: Insecta
- Order: Lepidoptera
- Family: Depressariidae
- Genus: Depressaria
- Species: D. ruticola

Binomial name
- Depressaria ruticola Christoph, 1873

Species of moth

Depressaria ruticola is a moth in the family Depressariidae. It was described by Hugo Theodor Christoph in 1873. It is found in North Africa (Tunisia), Iran, Palestine, Turkmenistan, Uzbekistan, Tajikistan, as well as the United Arab Emirates.

The larvae feed on Haplophyllum tuberculatum.

== Subspecies ==
- Depressaria ruticola ruticola
- Depressaria ruticola arabica Lvovsky, 2009 (United Arab Emirates)
