= Depressaria daucivorella =

Anise moth

Scientific classification
- Kingdom: Animalia
- Phylum: Arthropoda
- Class: Insecta
- Order: Lepidoptera
- Family: Depressariidae
- Genus: Depressaria
- Species: D. daucivorella

Binomial name
- Depressaria daucivorella Ragonot, 1889

Synonyms
- Depressaria mesopotamica Amsel, 1949

Species of moth

Depressaria daucivorella, the anise moth, is a moth of the family Depressariidae. It is found in France, Switzerland, Austria, Italy and on Cyprus. It has also been recorded from Israel, Turkey and Iraq.

The wingspan is about 23 mm.

The larvae feed on Laserpitium species, including Laserpitium siler and Laserpitium halleri, as well as Pimpinella anisum (anise).
