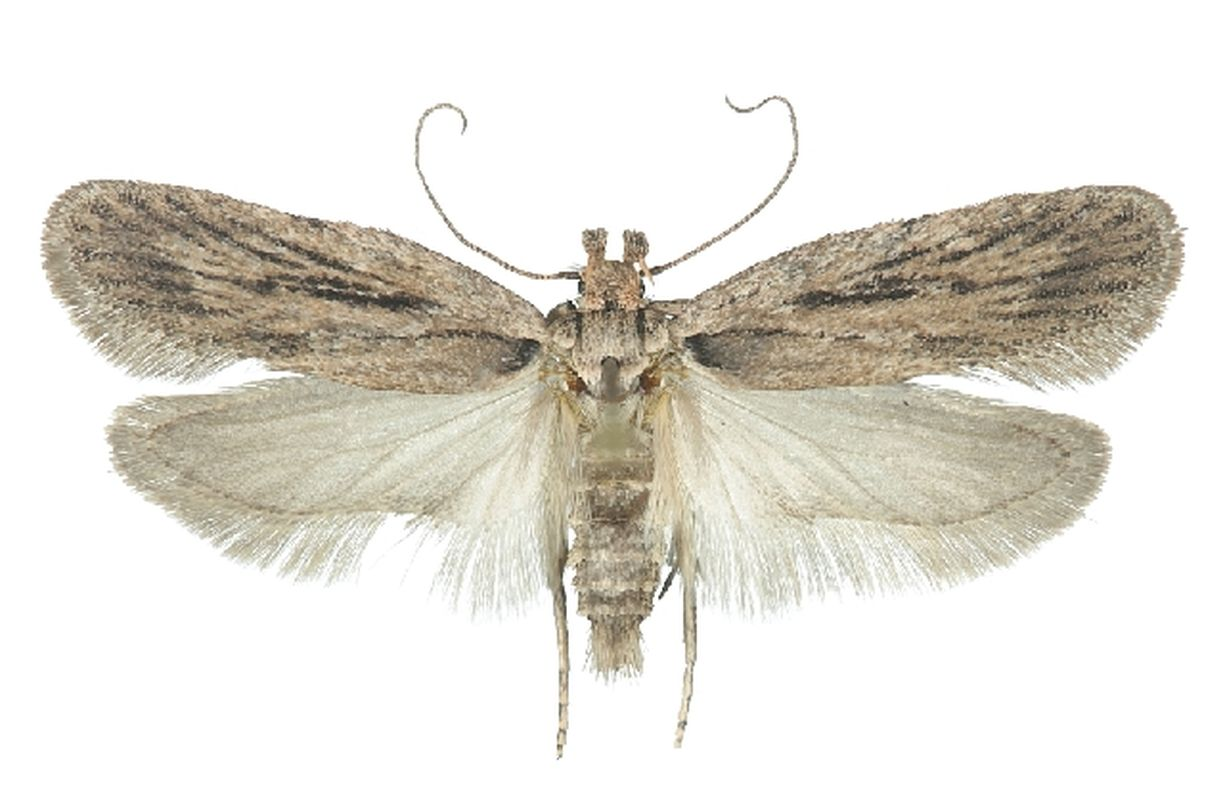

Scientific classification
- Kingdom: Animalia
- Phylum: Arthropoda
- Clade: Pancrustacea
- Class: Insecta
- Order: Lepidoptera
- Family: Depressariidae
- Genus: Depressaria
- Species: D. atrostrigella

Binomial name
- Depressaria atrostrigella Clarke, 1941

= Depressaria atrostrigella =

Species of moth

Depressaria atrostrigella is a moth in the family Depressariidae. It was described by John Frederick Gates Clarke in 1941. It is found in North America, where it has been recorded from south-western Manitoba and Colorado.

The wingspan is 21–24 mm. The forewings are ocherous white, strongly suffused with deep gray. The inner angle, veins, a longitudinal dash in the cell and a series of spots around the termen are all blackish fuscous. The hindwings are pale smoky gray.
