= Depressaria bupleurella =

Scientific classification
- Kingdom: Animalia
- Phylum: Arthropoda
- Clade: Pancrustacea
- Class: Insecta
- Order: Lepidoptera
- Family: Depressariidae
- Genus: Depressaria
- Species: D. bupleurella

Binomial name
- Depressaria bupleurella Heinemann, 1870

Species of moth

Depressaria bupleurella is a moth of the family Depressariidae. It is found from Italy, France and Germany east to Poland, Ukraine and Romania.

The larvae feed on Bupleurum falcatum.
