= Depressaria nomia =

Scientific classification
- Domain: Eukaryota
- Kingdom: Animalia
- Phylum: Arthropoda
- Class: Insecta
- Order: Lepidoptera
- Family: Depressariidae
- Genus: Depressaria
- Species: D. nomia

Binomial name
- Depressaria nomia Butler, 1879

Species of moth

Depressaria nomia is a moth in the family Depressariidae. It was described by Arthur Gardiner Butler in 1879. It is found in Japan.

The wingspan is about 25 mm. There are two whitish discoidal spots partly enclosed in black dots on the forewings, as well as an ill-defined discal series of longitudinal black internervular lines or dashes and a marginal series of black spots.
