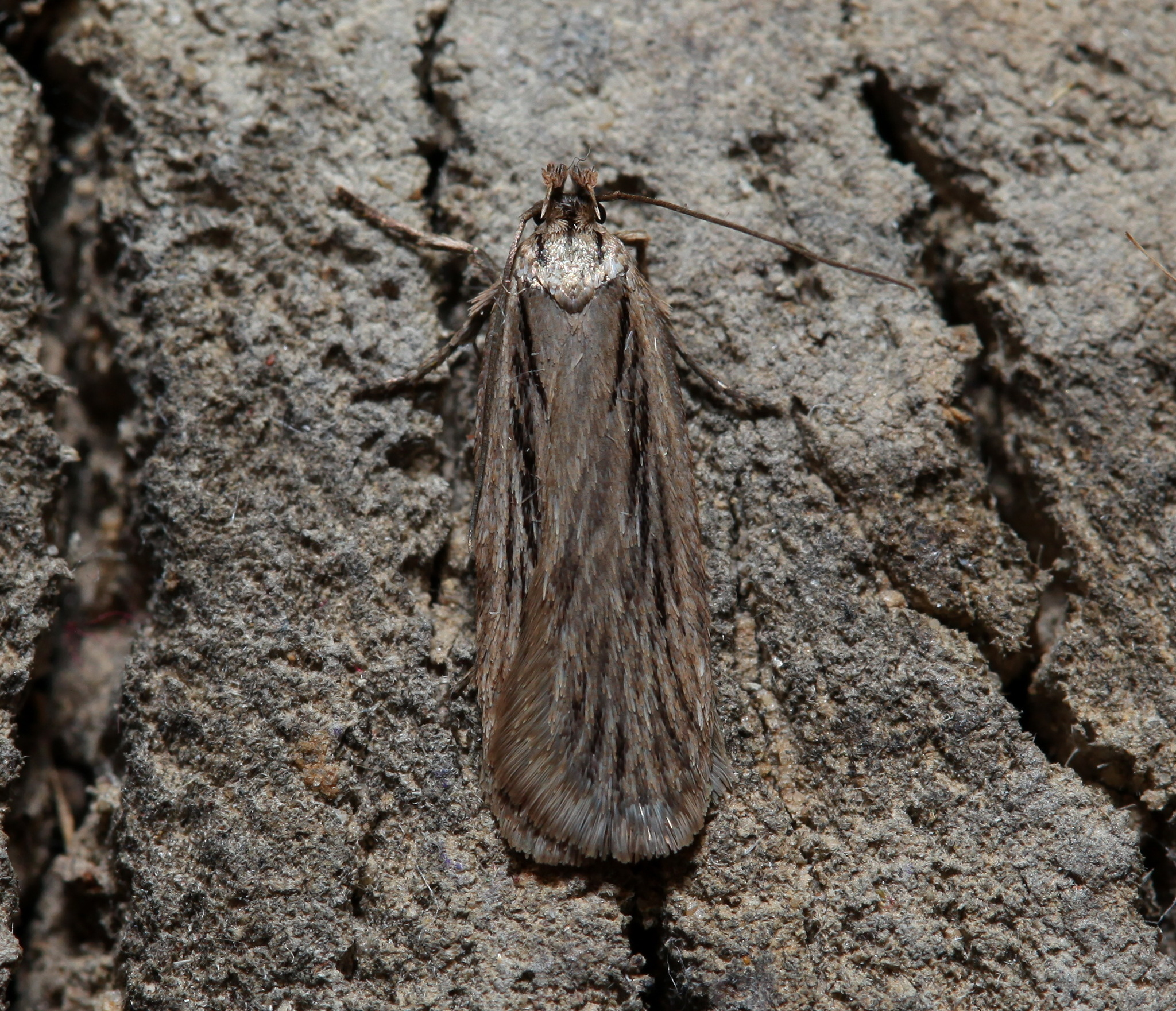

Scientific classification
- Kingdom: Animalia
- Phylum: Arthropoda
- Class: Insecta
- Order: Lepidoptera
- Family: Depressariidae
- Genus: Depressaria
- Species: D. cervicella

Binomial name
- Depressaria cervicella Herrich-Schaffer, 1854

= Depressaria cervicella =

Species of moth

Depressaria cervicella is a species of moth in the family Depressariidae. It is found in Europe (Spain, Italy, Austria, the Czech Republic, Hungary and Croatia), Asia Minor, and Iran.

The larvae feed on the flowers and leaves of Trinia glauca.
