= Depressaria niphosyrphas =

Scientific classification
- Kingdom: Animalia
- Phylum: Arthropoda
- Class: Insecta
- Order: Lepidoptera
- Family: Depressariidae
- Genus: Depressaria
- Species: D. niphosyrphas

Binomial name
- Depressaria niphosyrphas Meyrick, 1931

Species of moth

Depressaria niphosyrphas is a moth in the family Depressariidae. It was described by Edward Meyrick in 1931. It is found in south-eastern Siberia.
