= Depressaria angelicivora =

Scientific classification
- Domain: Eukaryota
- Kingdom: Animalia
- Phylum: Arthropoda
- Class: Insecta
- Order: Lepidoptera
- Family: Depressariidae
- Genus: Depressaria
- Species: D. angelicivora

Binomial name
- Depressaria angelicivora Clarke, 1952

Species of moth

Depressaria angelicivora is a moth in the family Depressariidae. It was described by Clarke in 1952. It is found in North America, where it has been recorded from Montana and Washington.

The larvae feed on Angelica arguta.
