= Depressaria whitmani =

Scientific classification
- Domain: Eukaryota
- Kingdom: Animalia
- Phylum: Arthropoda
- Class: Insecta
- Order: Lepidoptera
- Family: Depressariidae
- Genus: Depressaria
- Species: D. whitmani

Binomial name
- Depressaria whitmani J. F. G. Clarke, 1941

Species of moth

Depressaria whitmani is a moth in the family Depressariidae. It was described by John Frederick Gates Clarke in 1941. It is found in North America, where it has been recorded from California, Arizona, Washington, Colorado and Montana.

The wingspan is 18–22 mm. The forewings are blackish fuscous irrorated (sprinkled) with drab and olive-buff scales. There are three short dashes at the basal third and the bases of veins nine to eleven, as well as a series of small spots at the ends of all the veins around the termen are black. There is an olive-buff spot at the end of the cell, preceded by a few black scales. The hindwings are light fuscous, but darker apically.

The larvae feed on Lomatium macrocarpum.
