= Depressaria prospicua =

Scientific classification
- Kingdom: Animalia
- Phylum: Arthropoda
- Class: Insecta
- Order: Lepidoptera
- Family: Depressariidae
- Genus: Depressaria
- Species: D. prospicua

Binomial name
- Depressaria prospicua Meyrick, 1914

Species of moth

Depressaria prospicua is a moth in the family Depressariidae. It was described by Edward Meyrick in 1914 and is found in South Africa.

The wingspan is 19–20 mm. The forewings are whitish ochreous, tinged here and there with brownish, and scattered with blackish specks. A blackish-grey spot appears at the base of the costa, with its edge marked by a black dot above the middle of the wing; the corresponding dorsal space is whitish. The first discal stigma is black, accompanied by an additional dot placed obliquely before and slightly above it, both surrounded by a white suffusion. The second discal stigma is white, edged with dark fuscous, and is sometimes preceded by an indistinct white dot slightly above it. These markings are often surrounded by ochreous-brown suffusion, occasionally forming a longitudinal streak. There is also an undefined, angulated subterminal fascia of brownish suffusion. Dots composed of two or three black specks are found along the posterior part of the costa and termen. The hindwings are ochreous whitish, slightly tinged with grey.
