= Depressaria veneficella =

Scientific classification
- Kingdom: Animalia
- Phylum: Arthropoda
- Clade: Pancrustacea
- Class: Insecta
- Order: Lepidoptera
- Family: Depressariidae
- Genus: Depressaria
- Species: D. veneficella

Binomial name
- Depressaria veneficella Zeller, 1847

Species of moth

Depressaria veneficella is a moth of the family Depressariidae. It is found in Spain, Croatia, Greece, Romania and Turkey and on Sardinia, Sicily and Crete. It has also been recorded from Mongolia.

The larvae feed on Thapsia garganica. They feed on the unexpanded umbels still enclosed within their sheaths. They devour the flowers and the tender stems. In the latter, they bore holes, causing the stems to become black and die off in some cases. They eat out the inner pith of the stem, into which they bore at intervals. When the blossoms have unfolded, they spin them together and live amongst them. Pupation takes place under decayed remains of plants in a slight cocoon.
