= Depressaria eryngiella =

Scientific classification
- Domain: Eukaryota
- Kingdom: Animalia
- Phylum: Arthropoda
- Class: Insecta
- Order: Lepidoptera
- Family: Depressariidae
- Genus: Depressaria
- Species: D. eryngiella

Binomial name
- Depressaria eryngiella Milliere, 1881

Synonyms
- Depressaria campestrella Chretien, 1896; Depressaria obolucha Meyrick, 1936

Species of moth

Depressaria eryngiella is a moth of the family Depressariidae. It is found in France, Spain and Ukraine.
