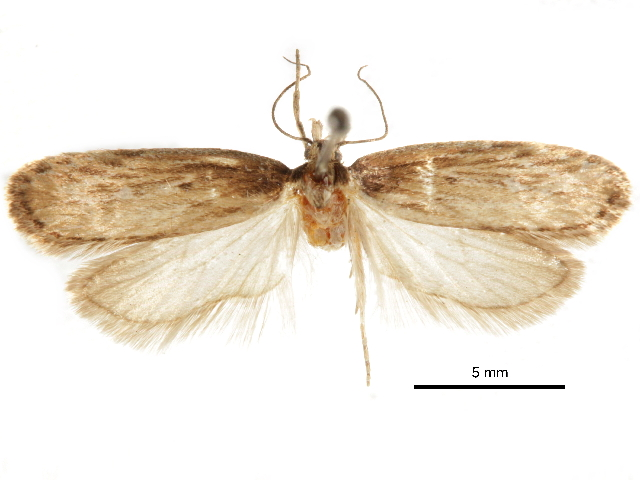

Scientific classification
- Domain: Eukaryota
- Kingdom: Animalia
- Phylum: Arthropoda
- Class: Insecta
- Order: Lepidoptera
- Family: Depressariidae
- Genus: Depressaria
- Species: D. artemisiella

Binomial name
- Depressaria artemisiella McDunnough, 1927

= Depressaria artemisiella =

Species of moth

Depressaria artemisiella is a species of moth in the family Depressariidae. It was first described by James Halliday McDunnough in 1927. It is found in North America, where it has been recorded from British Columbia and Utah.

== Description ==
The wingspan is about 22 mm, the forewings are light wood brown, shaded with deep brown on the costal half at the base and streaked with white and black. The subcostal vein is black irrorated (sprinkled) with white on the outer half and veins five to nine are indicated by black scaling. There is a transverse crescentic whitish fascia at the apical third and an indistinct black discal spot at the basal third in the cell, followed by a white streak. There is a series of ill-defined blackish spots from the apical third of the costa, around the termen to the middle of the inner margin. The hindwings are pale smoky.

== Ecology ==
The larvae feed on Artemisia species.
