= Depressaria indecorella =

Scientific classification
- Domain: Eukaryota
- Kingdom: Animalia
- Phylum: Arthropoda
- Class: Insecta
- Order: Lepidoptera
- Family: Depressariidae
- Genus: Depressaria
- Species: D. indecorella

Binomial name
- Depressaria indecorella Rebel, 1917

Species of moth

Depressaria indecorella is a moth of the family Depressariidae. It is found in Russia.

The wingspan is about 21 mm.
