= Depressaria krasnowodskella =

Scientific classification
- Domain: Eukaryota
- Kingdom: Animalia
- Phylum: Arthropoda
- Class: Insecta
- Order: Lepidoptera
- Family: Depressariidae
- Genus: Depressaria
- Species: D. krasnowodskella

Binomial name
- Depressaria krasnowodskella Hannemann, 1953

Species of moth

Depressaria krasnowodskella is a moth of the family Depressariidae. It is found in Turkmenistan and Portugal.
