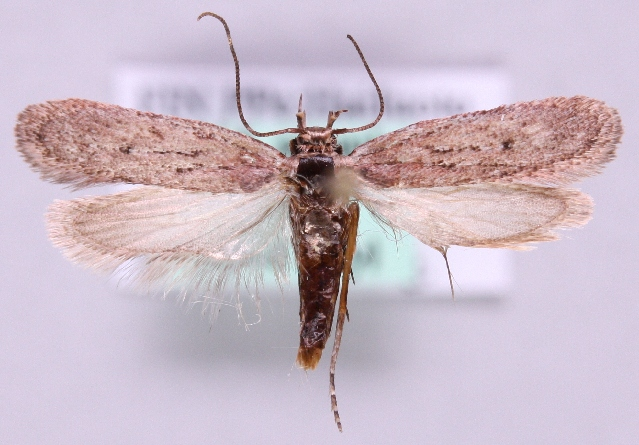

Scientific classification
- Kingdom: Animalia
- Phylum: Arthropoda
- Clade: Pancrustacea
- Class: Insecta
- Order: Lepidoptera
- Family: Depressariidae
- Genus: Depressaria
- Species: D. silesiaca

Binomial name
- Depressaria silesiaca Heinemann, 1870

Synonyms
- Depressaria millefoliella Chretien, 1908; Schistodepressaria freyi Hering, 1924

= Depressaria silesiaca =

Species of moth

Depressaria silesiaca is a moth of the family Depressariidae. It is widespread in Europe from the Pyrenees through the Alps to Fennoscandia, northern Russia, and Poland; it is also known from Great Britain.

The wingspan is 13–17 mm. Adults have been recorded from April to October.

The larvae feed on Achillea millefolium and Tanacetum vulgare. They live within a spun or rolled leaf.
