= Depressaria incognitella =

Scientific classification
- Domain: Eukaryota
- Kingdom: Animalia
- Phylum: Arthropoda
- Class: Insecta
- Order: Lepidoptera
- Family: Depressariidae
- Genus: Depressaria
- Species: D. incognitella

Binomial name
- Depressaria incognitella Hannemann, 1990

Species of moth

Depressaria incognitella is a moth of the family Depressariidae. It is found in France, Spain, Switzerland and Italy.
