= Depressaria erzurumella =

Scientific classification
- Kingdom: Animalia
- Phylum: Arthropoda
- Clade: Pancrustacea
- Class: Insecta
- Order: Lepidoptera
- Family: Depressariidae
- Genus: Depressaria
- Species: D. erzurumella

Binomial name
- Depressaria erzurumella Lvovsky, 1996

Species of moth

Depressaria erzurumella is a moth in the family Depressariidae. It was described by Alexandr L. Lvovsky in 1996. It is found in Turkey.
