= Depressaria altaica =

Scientific classification
- Kingdom: Animalia
- Phylum: Arthropoda
- Clade: Pancrustacea
- Class: Insecta
- Order: Lepidoptera
- Family: Depressariidae
- Genus: Depressaria
- Species: D. altaica

Binomial name
- Depressaria altaica Zeller, 1854

Species of moth

Depressaria altaica is a moth of the family Depressariidae. It is found in Russia (Altai Mountains).
