= Depressaria basicostata =

Scientific classification
- Kingdom: Animalia
- Phylum: Arthropoda
- Clade: Pancrustacea
- Class: Insecta
- Order: Lepidoptera
- Family: Depressariidae
- Genus: Depressaria
- Species: D. basicostata

Binomial name
- Depressaria basicostata Matsumura, 1931

Species of moth

Depressaria basicostata is a moth of the family Depressariidae. It is found in Japan.
