= Depressaria angustati =

Scientific classification
- Domain: Eukaryota
- Kingdom: Animalia
- Phylum: Arthropoda
- Class: Insecta
- Order: Lepidoptera
- Family: Depressariidae
- Genus: Depressaria
- Species: D. angustati

Binomial name
- Depressaria angustati J. F. G. Clarke, 1941

Species of moth

Depressaria angustati is a moth in the family Depressariidae. It was described by John Frederick Gates Clarke in 1941. It is found in North America, where it has been recorded from Washington.

The wingspan is 17–21 mm. The forewings are blackish fuscous with scattered ochreous scales. The discal spot at the middle of the cell is black with some mixed ochreous scales. There is an ochreous spot at the end of the cell, preceded and followed by black scales. There is an indistinct broad ochreous fascia from the costa to the center of the cell and a similarly colored but narrower fascia at two-thirds from the costa. The costa is sprinkled with ochreous scales. The hindwings are fuscous, but lighter basally.

The larvae feed on Lomatium angustatum.
