= Depressaria jugurthella =

Scientific classification
- Domain: Eukaryota
- Kingdom: Animalia
- Phylum: Arthropoda
- Class: Insecta
- Order: Lepidoptera
- Family: Depressariidae
- Genus: Depressaria
- Species: D. jugurthella

Binomial name
- Depressaria jugurthella (H. Lucas, 1849)

Synonyms
- Haemylis jugurthella H. Lucas, 1849

Species of moth

Depressaria jugurthella is a moth in the family Depressariidae. It was described by Hippolyte Lucas in 1849. It is found in Algeria.
