= Depressaria radiosquamella =

Scientific classification
- Domain: Eukaryota
- Kingdom: Animalia
- Phylum: Arthropoda
- Class: Insecta
- Order: Lepidoptera
- Family: Depressariidae
- Genus: Depressaria
- Species: D. radiosquamella

Binomial name
- Depressaria radiosquamella Walsingham, 1898

Species of moth

Depressaria radiosquamella is a moth of the family Depressariidae. It is found on Corsica.

The wingspan is 20–24 mm. The forewings are pale cinereous (ash-grey) with a rosy tinge and smeared with fuscous, especially towards the base of the fold and dorsum. The hindwings are shining pale bone colour.
