= Depressaria erinaceella =

Scientific classification
- Domain: Eukaryota
- Kingdom: Animalia
- Phylum: Arthropoda
- Class: Insecta
- Order: Lepidoptera
- Family: Depressariidae
- Genus: Depressaria
- Species: D. erinaceella

Binomial name
- Depressaria erinaceella Staudinger, 1870

Synonyms
- Hasenfussia erinaceella; Depressaria sardoniella Rebel, 1936

Species of moth

Depressaria erinaceella is a moth of the family Depressariidae. It is found in France, Spain, Portugal, North Macedonia and on the Italian islands of Sardinia and Sicily.

The wingspan is about 25 mm. A new generation is born about once a year.

The larvae feed on Cynara cardunculus. They bore the stem of their host plant.
