= Depressaria fuscipedella =

Scientific classification
- Domain: Eukaryota
- Kingdom: Animalia
- Phylum: Arthropoda
- Class: Insecta
- Order: Lepidoptera
- Family: Depressariidae
- Genus: Depressaria
- Species: D. fuscipedella

Binomial name
- Depressaria fuscipedella Chrétien, 1915

Species of moth

Depressaria fuscipedella is a moth in the family Depressariidae. It was described by Pierre Chrétien in 1915. It is found in North Africa.
