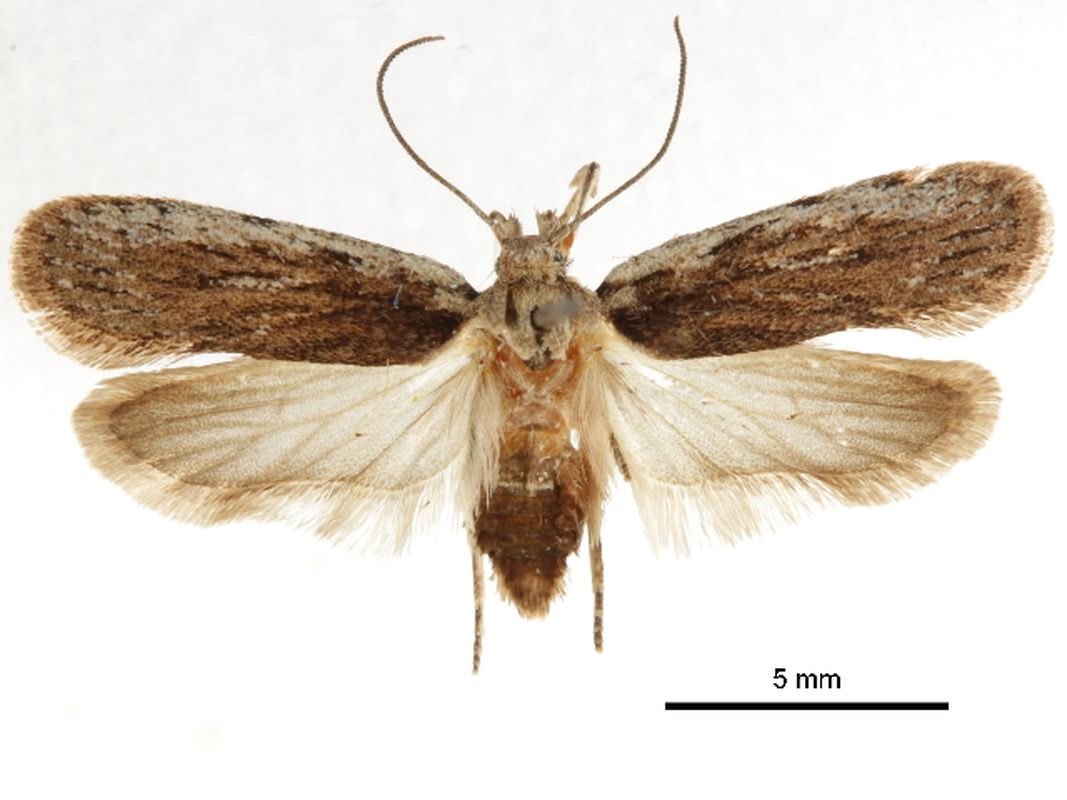

Scientific classification
- Kingdom: Animalia
- Phylum: Arthropoda
- Clade: Pancrustacea
- Class: Insecta
- Order: Lepidoptera
- Family: Depressariidae
- Genus: Depressaria
- Species: D. cinereocostella

Binomial name
- Depressaria cinereocostella Clemens, 1864

Synonyms
- Depressaria clausella Walker, 1864

= Depressaria cinereocostella =

Species of moth

Depressaria cinereocostella is a moth in the family Depressariidae. It was described by James Brackenridge Clemens in 1864. It is found in North America, where it has been recorded from Manitoba, Nova Scotia to Georgia and in Nebraska.

The wingspan is 15–22 mm. The forewings are cinereous, overlaid with dull brownish red (except at the costa) and suffused with blackish fuscous in the basal half and irrorated (sprinkled) with black and cinereous scales. There is a series of longitudinal black dashes in the fold and along the veins and the base of the costa and anal angle are blackish fuscous. There is a series of ill-defined blackish-fuscous spots from the middle of the costa around the termen to the inner margin. The hindwings are greyish fuscous, but lighter basally.

The larvae feed on Oxypolis rigidior, Sium suave, Cicuta maculata, Carum carvi and Ligusticum scoticum.
