= Depressaria kasyi =

Scientific classification
- Domain: Eukaryota
- Kingdom: Animalia
- Phylum: Arthropoda
- Class: Insecta
- Order: Lepidoptera
- Family: Depressariidae
- Genus: Depressaria
- Species: D. kasyi

Binomial name
- Depressaria kasyi Hanneman, 1976

Species of moth

Depressaria kasyi is a moth in the family Depressariidae. It was described by Hans-Joachim Hannemann in 1976. It is found in Afghanistan.
