= Depressaria zelleri =

Scientific classification
- Domain: Eukaryota
- Kingdom: Animalia
- Phylum: Arthropoda
- Class: Insecta
- Order: Lepidoptera
- Family: Depressariidae
- Genus: Depressaria
- Species: D. zelleri

Binomial name
- Depressaria zelleri Staudinger, 1879

Species of moth

Depressaria zelleri is a moth of the family Depressariidae. It is found in Italy, Romania and Turkey.

The wingspan is 25–27 mm.
