= Depressaria halophilella =

Scientific classification
- Kingdom: Animalia
- Phylum: Arthropoda
- Clade: Pancrustacea
- Class: Insecta
- Order: Lepidoptera
- Family: Depressariidae
- Genus: Depressaria
- Species: D. halophilella

Binomial name
- Depressaria halophilella Chretien, 1908

Species of moth

Depressaria halophilella is a moth of the family Depressariidae. It is found in the Mediterranean Europe (from Spain to Greece, including the Balearic Islands, Sicily, Corsica, and Crete) and on Madeira.

The wingspan is 15–18 mm. The larvae feed on Crithmum maritimum.
