= Depressaria chlorothorax =

Scientific classification
- Kingdom: Animalia
- Phylum: Arthropoda
- Class: Insecta
- Order: Lepidoptera
- Family: Depressariidae
- Genus: Depressaria
- Species: D. chlorothorax

Binomial name
- Depressaria chlorothorax Meyrick, 1921

Species of moth

Depressaria chlorothorax is a moth in the family Depressariidae. It was described by Edward Meyrick in 1921. It is found in Asia Minor and Palestine.

The wingspan is about 18 mm. The forewings are light brownish, irregularly sprinkled dark fuscous and with a small dark fuscous spot on the base of the costa, surrounded by light suffusion. There is a short ochreous-whitish mark on the base of the dorsum, surmounted by a spot of dark fuscous suffusion. The stigmata are represented by cloudy spots of dark fuscous suffusion, the plical rather beyond the first discal, both discal connected by transverse dark suffusion with a similar streak extending along the costa from near the base. There is a curved subterminal fascia and terminal streak of similar suffusion largely confluent. The hindwings are whitish grey.
