= Depressaria hystricella =

Scientific classification
- Domain: Eukaryota
- Kingdom: Animalia
- Phylum: Arthropoda
- Class: Insecta
- Order: Lepidoptera
- Family: Depressariidae
- Genus: Depressaria
- Species: D. hystricella

Binomial name
- Depressaria hystricella Moschler, 1860

Synonyms
- Horridopalpus hystricella

Species of moth

Depressaria hystricella is a moth of the family Depressariidae. It is found in Slovakia and Russia.

The larvae feed on Spiraea media.
