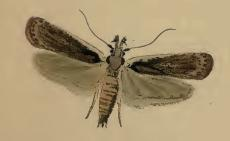

Scientific classification
- Kingdom: Animalia
- Phylum: Arthropoda
- Class: Insecta
- Order: Lepidoptera
- Family: Depressariidae
- Genus: Depressaria
- Species: D. dictamnella

Binomial name
- Depressaria dictamnella (Treitschke, 1835)

Synonyms
- Haemylis dictamnella Treitschke, 1835; Horridopalpus dictamnella; Depressaria albicostella Krone, 1911

= Depressaria dictamnella =

Species of moth

Depressaria dictamnella is a moth of the family Depressariidae. It is found in Germany, Austria, Italy, Hungary, Croatia, North Macedonia, Bulgaria, Romania, Moldova and Ukraine.

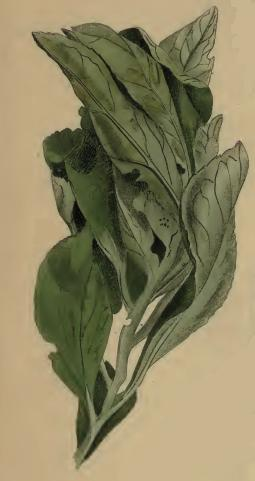
A sprig of Dictamnus albus attacked by larva

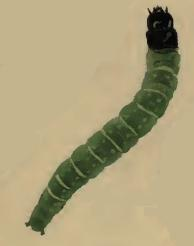
Larva

The wingspan is about 26 mm.

The larvae feed on the flowers and leaves of Dictamnus albus. They feed from a spinning.
