= Depressaria marcella =

Scientific classification
- Kingdom: Animalia
- Phylum: Arthropoda
- Class: Insecta
- Order: Lepidoptera
- Family: Depressariidae
- Genus: Depressaria
- Species: D. marcella

Binomial name
- Depressaria marcella Rebel, 1901

Synonyms
- Depressaria chneouriella Lucas, 1939; Depressaria cuprinella Walsingham, 1907; Platyedra cruenta Meyrick, 1920; Depressaria marcella marcidella Walsingham, 1907

Species of moth

Depressaria marcella is a moth of the family Depressariidae. It is found in France, Spain, Portugal, Slovakia, Hungary, Croatia, Romania, Bulgaria, North Macedonia, Greece and Turkey and on Sardinia and Sicily. It has also been recorded from Israel, Iran and North Africa.

The wingspan is about 15 mm. The forewings are light brownish, towards the base faintly rosy-tinged and in the disc somewhat mixed with whitish-ochreous. There is an undefined rather dark fuscous suffusion forming a basal patch, as well as a streak along the costa and there are oblique streaks from this to the disc before and beyond the middle indicating the stigmata. There is a rather broad angulated subterminal fascia and a narrow terminal fascia almost confluent with it. The hindwings are light grey.

The larvae feed on the flower buds of Daucus species, including Daucus carota and Daucus muricatus.
