= Depressaria ivinskisi =

Scientific classification
- Kingdom: Animalia
- Phylum: Arthropoda
- Clade: Pancrustacea
- Class: Insecta
- Order: Lepidoptera
- Family: Depressariidae
- Genus: Depressaria
- Species: D. ivinskisi

Binomial name
- Depressaria ivinskisi Lvovsky, 1990

Species of moth

Depressaria ivinskisi is a moth in the family Depressariidae. It was described by Alexandr L. Lvovsky in 1990. It is found in the Gissar Range of Central Asia.
