= Depressaria fuscovirgatella =

Scientific classification
- Kingdom: Animalia
- Phylum: Arthropoda
- Clade: Pancrustacea
- Class: Insecta
- Order: Lepidoptera
- Family: Depressariidae
- Genus: Depressaria
- Species: D. fuscovirgatella

Binomial name
- Depressaria fuscovirgatella Hanneman, 1967

Species of moth

Depressaria fuscovirgatella is a moth in the family Depressariidae. It was described by Hanneman in 1967. It is found in Iran.
