= Depressaria compactella =

Scientific classification
- Domain: Eukaryota
- Kingdom: Animalia
- Phylum: Arthropoda
- Class: Insecta
- Order: Lepidoptera
- Family: Depressariidae
- Genus: Depressaria
- Species: D. compactella

Binomial name
- Depressaria compactella Caradja, 1920

Species of moth

Depressaria compactella is a moth in the family Depressariidae. It was described by Aristide Caradja in 1920. It is found in south-eastern Siberia.
