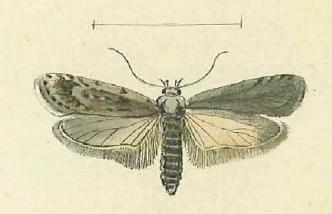

Scientific classification
- Domain: Eukaryota
- Kingdom: Animalia
- Phylum: Arthropoda
- Class: Insecta
- Order: Lepidoptera
- Family: Depressariidae
- Genus: Depressaria
- Species: D. floridella

Binomial name
- Depressaria floridella Mann, 1864

= Depressaria floridella =

Species of moth

Depressaria floridella is a moth of the family Depressariidae. It is found in Greece, Turkey and Israel.
