= Depressaria petronoma =

Scientific classification
- Kingdom: Animalia
- Phylum: Arthropoda
- Class: Insecta
- Order: Lepidoptera
- Family: Depressariidae
- Genus: Depressaria
- Species: D. petronoma

Binomial name
- Depressaria petronoma Meyrick, 1934

Species of moth

Depressaria petronoma is a moth in the family Depressariidae. It was described by Edward Meyrick in 1934. It is found in Japan.
