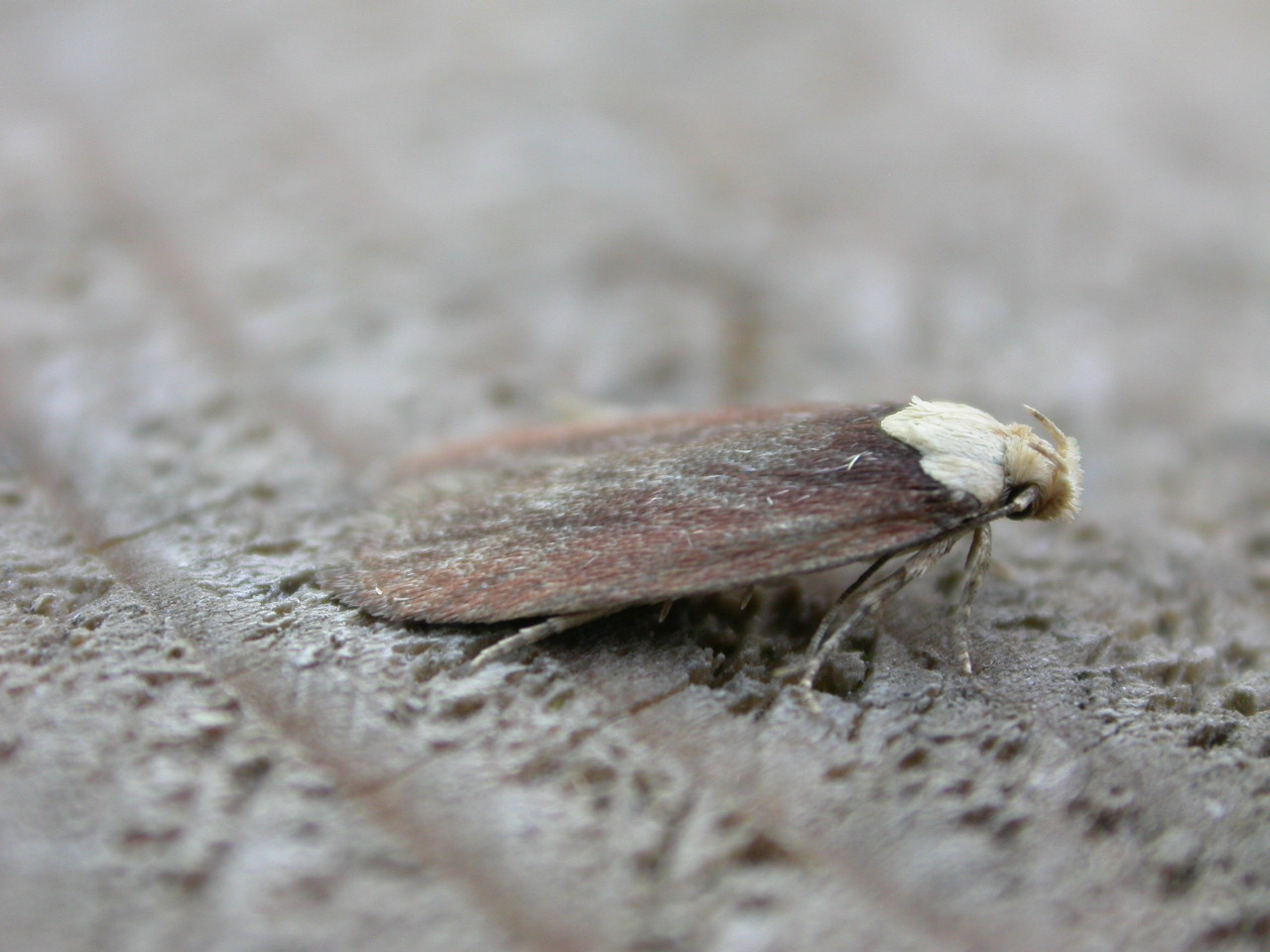

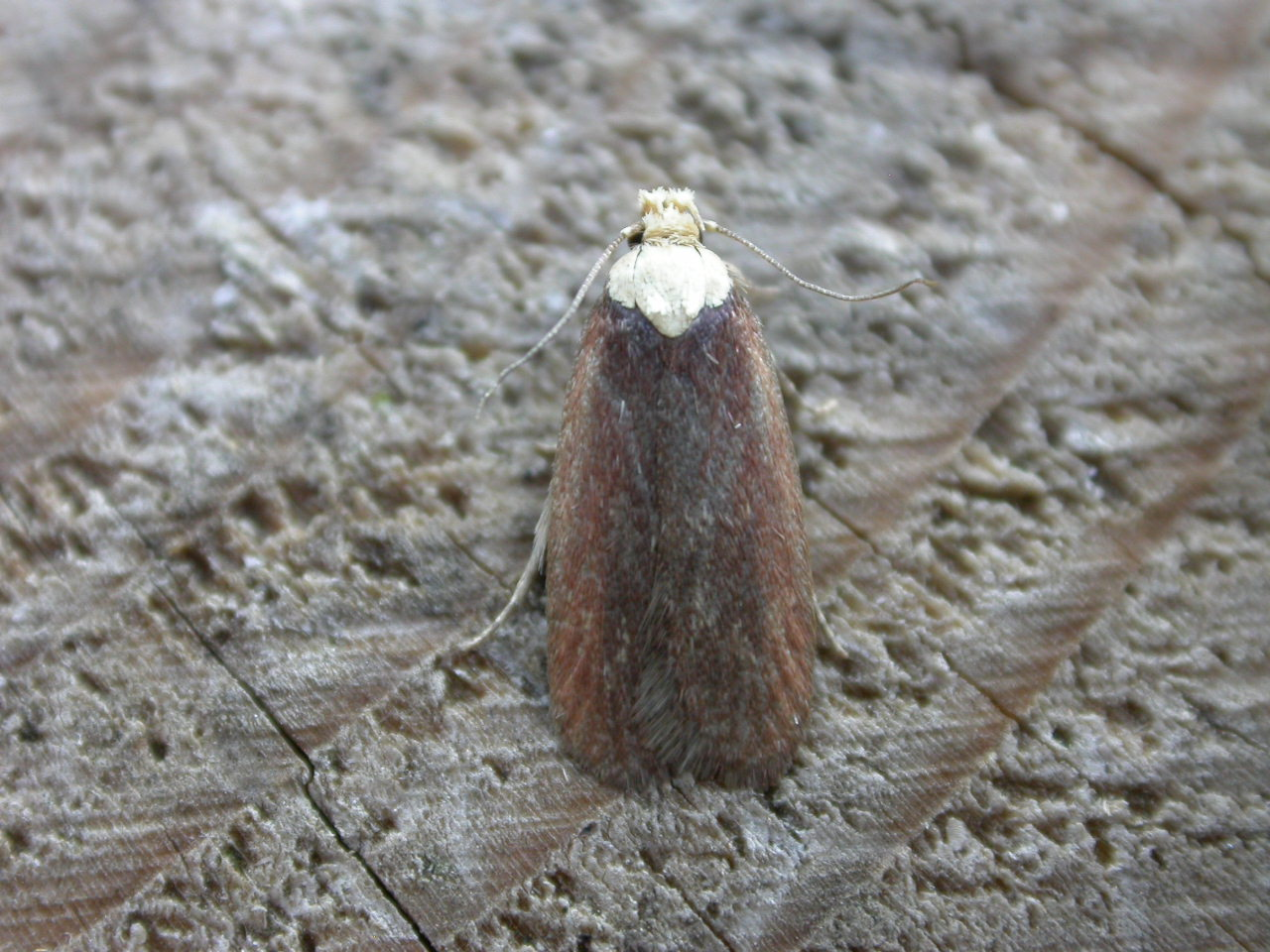

Scientific classification
- Kingdom: Animalia
- Phylum: Arthropoda
- Clade: Pancrustacea
- Class: Insecta
- Order: Lepidoptera
- Family: Depressariidae
- Genus: Depressaria
- Species: D. emeritella

Binomial name
- Depressaria emeritella Stainton, 1849

= Depressaria emeritella =

Species of moth

Depressaria emeritella is a moth of the family Depressariidae. It is found in most of Europe. It is also found in the Near East and the eastern part of the Palearctic realm.

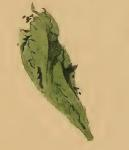
Part of a Tanacetum vulgare leaf folded by larva

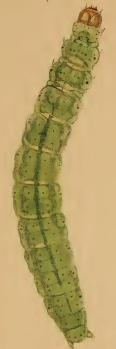
Larva

The wingspan is 22–26 mm. Adults are on wing from July to August and then hibernating until the following spring. There is one generation per year.

The larvae feed on Tanacetum vulgare.
