= Depressaria orthobathra =

Scientific classification
- Kingdom: Animalia
- Phylum: Arthropoda
- Class: Insecta
- Order: Lepidoptera
- Family: Depressariidae
- Genus: Depressaria
- Species: D. orthobathra

Binomial name
- Depressaria orthobathra Meyrick, 1918

Species of moth

Depressaria orthobathra is a moth in the family Depressariidae. It was described by Edward Meyrick in 1918. It is found in South Africa.

The wingspan is 15–18 mm. The forewings are whitish ochreous or light greyish ochreous, with some small scattered dark fuscous strigulae and with the base narrowly dark ashy grey mixed with black and the edge direct. The first discal stigma is small and blackish, with a similar dot obliquely before and above it, the second formed by a whitish dot ringed with fuscous. There is a marginal series of small black dots around the posterior half of the costa and termen. The hindwings of the males are pale grey, and grey in females.
