= Depressaria yakimae =

Scientific classification
- Domain: Eukaryota
- Kingdom: Animalia
- Phylum: Arthropoda
- Class: Insecta
- Order: Lepidoptera
- Family: Depressariidae
- Genus: Depressaria
- Species: D. yakimae

Binomial name
- Depressaria yakimae J. F. G. Clarke, 1941

Species of moth

Depressaria yakimae is a moth in the family Depressariidae. It was described by John Frederick Gates Clarke in 1941. It is found in North America, where it has been recorded from Washington.

The wingspan is 20–22 mm. The forewings are brownish ocherous mixed with white scales with a blackish-fuscous base and fuscous costa, mixed with white. The hindwings are fuscous, but lighter basally.

The larvae feed on Pteryxia terebenthina foeniculacea.
