= Depressaria kailai =

Scientific classification
- Kingdom: Animalia
- Phylum: Arthropoda
- Clade: Pancrustacea
- Class: Insecta
- Order: Lepidoptera
- Family: Depressariidae
- Genus: Depressaria
- Species: D. kailai

Binomial name
- Depressaria kailai Lvovsky, 2009

Species of moth

Depressaria kailai is a moth in the family Depressariidae. It was described by Alexandr L. Lvovsky in 2009. It is found in Kazakhstan and Tajikistan.
