= Depressaria colossella =

Scientific classification
- Domain: Eukaryota
- Kingdom: Animalia
- Phylum: Arthropoda
- Class: Insecta
- Order: Lepidoptera
- Family: Depressariidae
- Genus: Depressaria
- Species: D. colossella

Binomial name
- Depressaria colossella Caradja, 1920

Species of moth

Depressaria colossella is a moth in the family Depressariidae. It was described by Aristide Caradja in 1920. It is found in Japan and the Russian Far East.

The wingspan is about 30 mm.
