= Depressaria parahofmanni =

Scientific classification
- Domain: Eukaryota
- Kingdom: Animalia
- Phylum: Arthropoda
- Class: Insecta
- Order: Lepidoptera
- Family: Depressariidae
- Genus: Depressaria
- Species: D. parahofmanni

Binomial name
- Depressaria parahofmanni Hanneman, 1958

Species of moth

Depressaria parahofmanni is a moth in the family Depressariidae. It was described by Hans-Joachim Hannemann in 1958. It is found in Iran.
