= Depressaria gallicella =

Scientific classification
- Kingdom: Animalia
- Phylum: Arthropoda
- Class: Insecta
- Order: Lepidoptera
- Family: Depressariidae
- Genus: Depressaria
- Species: D. gallicella

Binomial name
- Depressaria gallicella Chretien, 1908

Synonyms
- Depressaria quintana Weber, 1945

Species of moth

Depressaria gallicella is a moth of the family Depressariidae. It is found in France and Switzerland.

The wingspan is 22–26 mm.
