= Depressaria pyrenaella =

Scientific classification
- Domain: Eukaryota
- Kingdom: Animalia
- Phylum: Arthropoda
- Class: Insecta
- Order: Lepidoptera
- Family: Depressariidae
- Genus: Depressaria
- Species: D. pyrenaella

Binomial name
- Depressaria pyrenaella Sumpich, 2013

Species of moth

Depressaria pyrenaella is a moth in the family Depressariidae. It was described by Jan Šumpich in 2013. It is found in the Pyrenees of Spain and France (Region of Languedoc-Roussillon).
