= Depressaria clausulata =

Scientific classification
- Kingdom: Animalia
- Phylum: Arthropoda
- Class: Insecta
- Order: Lepidoptera
- Family: Depressariidae
- Genus: Depressaria
- Species: D. clausulata

Binomial name
- Depressaria clausulata Meyrick, 1911

Species of moth

Depressaria clausulata is a moth in the family Depressariidae. It was described by Edward Meyrick in 1911. It is found in South Africa.

The wingspan is about 22 mm. The forewings are chocolate brown, towards the costa somewhat suffused with pale ochreous irroration (speckles) and with the costal edge grey strigulated with blackish irroration. The base of the dorsum is narrowly whitish edged above by some black scales and a patch of dark purple-fuscous suffusion. The first discal stigma is black, with a similar dot obliquely before and above it, both edged posteriorly with some white scales. The second discal stigma is white, and there is a group of several white scales midway between the first and second. There are some undefined black dots on the termen. The hindwings are grey, becoming whitish grey towards the base.
