= Depressaria indelibatella =

Scientific classification
- Domain: Eukaryota
- Kingdom: Animalia
- Phylum: Arthropoda
- Class: Insecta
- Order: Lepidoptera
- Family: Depressariidae
- Genus: Depressaria
- Species: D. indelibatella

Binomial name
- Depressaria indelibatella Hanneman, 1971

Species of moth

Depressaria indelibatella is a moth in the family Depressariidae. It was described by Hanneman in 1971. It is found in Mongolia.
