= Depressaria tenebricosa =

Scientific classification
- Kingdom: Animalia
- Phylum: Arthropoda
- Clade: Pancrustacea
- Class: Insecta
- Order: Lepidoptera
- Family: Depressariidae
- Genus: Depressaria
- Species: D. tenebricosa

Binomial name
- Depressaria tenebricosa Zeller, 1854

Synonyms
- Depressaria amblyopa Meyrick, 1921

Species of moth

Depressaria tenebricosa is a moth of the family Depressariidae. It is found in Spain, Portugal, Italy, Croatia, Romania, North Macedonia and Greece. It has also been recorded from Israel and Asia Minor.

The larvae feed on Conopodium majus.
