= Depressaria discipunctella =

Scientific classification
- Domain: Eukaryota
- Kingdom: Animalia
- Phylum: Arthropoda
- Class: Insecta
- Order: Lepidoptera
- Family: Depressariidae
- Genus: Depressaria
- Species: D. discipunctella

Binomial name
- Depressaria discipunctella Herrich-Schäffer, 1854

Synonyms
- Depressaria discipunctella var. helladicella Rebel, 1906

Species of moth

Depressaria discipunctella is a moth of the family Depressariidae. It is found in the Netherlands, Belgium, Germany, France, Spain, Portugal, Italy, Slovakia, Ukraine, Romania, Bulgaria, North Macedonia and Greece. Outside Europe it has been recorded from Lebanon, Syria and Iran. Formally found in Great Britain (last record in 1924 in Oxfordshire), where it was previously widespread.

The wingspan is 21–25 mm. Adults are on wing from May to June.
