= Depressaria peniculatella =

Scientific classification
- Domain: Eukaryota
- Kingdom: Animalia
- Phylum: Arthropoda
- Class: Insecta
- Order: Lepidoptera
- Family: Depressariidae
- Genus: Depressaria
- Species: D. peniculatella

Binomial name
- Depressaria peniculatella Turati, 1922

Synonyms
- Hasenfussia peniculatella; Depressaria rungsiella Hannemann, 1953

Species of moth

Depressaria peniculatella is a moth of the family Depressariidae. It is found in Spain and Portugal.
