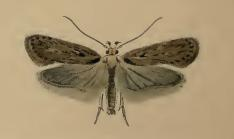

Scientific classification
- Kingdom: Animalia
- Phylum: Arthropoda
- Clade: Pancrustacea
- Class: Insecta
- Order: Lepidoptera
- Family: Depressariidae
- Genus: Depressaria
- Species: D. absynthiella

Binomial name
- Depressaria absynthiella Herrich-Schaffer, 1865

Synonyms
- Depressaria absinthivora Frey, 1880; Depressaria tenerifae Walsingham, 1907; Depressaria anchusella Nowicki, 1860; Depressaria absinthivora Frey, 1880

= Depressaria absynthiella =

Species of moth

Depressaria absynthiella is a moth of the family Depressariidae. It is found in France, Germany, Switzerland, Austria, Italy, the Czech Republic, Hungary, Romania, Ukraine, Bulgaria, North Macedonia, Albania and Greece.

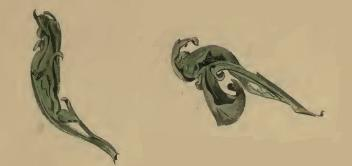
Shoots of Artemisia absinthium inhabited by larvae

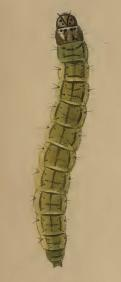
Larva

The larvae feed on Artemisia absinthium.
