= Depressaria velox =

Scientific classification
- Kingdom: Animalia
- Phylum: Arthropoda
- Class: Insecta
- Order: Lepidoptera
- Family: Depressariidae
- Genus: Depressaria
- Species: D. velox

Binomial name
- Depressaria velox Staudinger, 1859

Synonyms
- Depressaria tortuosella Chretien, 1908

Species of moth

Depressaria velox is a moth of the family Depressariidae. It is found in Spain, France, Ukraine and Greece.

The wingspan is 20–25 mm.

The larvae feed on Ferula species.
