= Depressaria alienella =

Scientific classification
- Kingdom: Animalia
- Phylum: Arthropoda
- Clade: Pancrustacea
- Class: Insecta
- Order: Lepidoptera
- Family: Depressariidae
- Genus: Depressaria
- Species: D. alienella

Binomial name
- Depressaria alienella Busck, 1904

Synonyms
- Depressaria nymphidia Meyrick, 1918; Depressaria corystopa Meyrick, 1927

Species of moth

Depressaria alienella is a moth in the family Depressariidae. It was described by August Busck in 1904. It is found in North America, where it has been recorded from Yukon to Nova Scotia, south to New England, Arizona and California.

The wingspan is 18–21 mm. The forewings are light fuscous overlaid with red or reddish fuscous, irrorated with cinereous and fuscous and streaked with blackish fuscous. There is a white discal spot at the end of the cell, preceded and followed by fuscous. There is an ill-defined row of fuscous spots around the termen. Adults are on wing from July to September.

The larvae feed on the flowers of Artemisia and Achillea species.
