= Depressaria schellbachi =

Scientific classification
- Kingdom: Animalia
- Phylum: Arthropoda
- Class: Insecta
- Order: Lepidoptera
- Family: Depressariidae
- Genus: Depressaria
- Species: D. schellbachi

Binomial name
- Depressaria schellbachi Clarke, 1947

Species of moth

Depressaria schellbachi is a moth in the family Depressariidae. It was described by Clarke in 1947. It is found in North America, where it has been recorded from Arizona and Wyoming.
