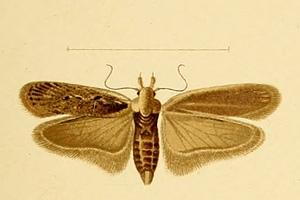

Scientific classification
- Domain: Eukaryota
- Kingdom: Animalia
- Phylum: Arthropoda
- Class: Insecta
- Order: Lepidoptera
- Family: Depressariidae
- Genus: Depressaria
- Species: D. pentheri

Binomial name
- Depressaria pentheri Rebel, 1904

= Depressaria pentheri =

Species of moth

Depressaria pentheri is a species of moth in the family Depressariidae. It is found in Bulgaria, Albania and Bosnia and Herzegovina.

The wingspan is about 23 mm.
