= Depressaria irregularis =

Scientific classification
- Kingdom: Animalia
- Phylum: Arthropoda
- Clade: Pancrustacea
- Class: Insecta
- Order: Lepidoptera
- Family: Depressariidae
- Genus: Depressaria
- Species: D. irregularis

Binomial name
- Depressaria irregularis Matsumura, 1931

Species of moth

Depressaria irregularis is a moth of the family Depressariidae. It is found in Japan and the Russian Far East.
