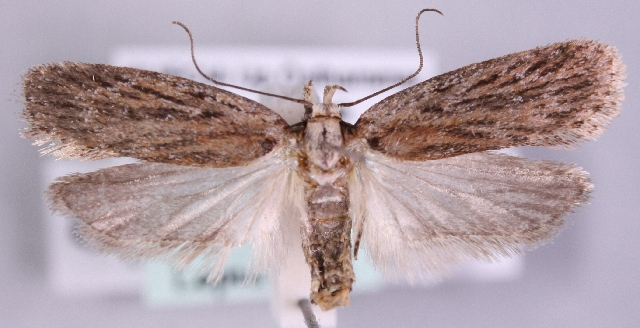

Scientific classification
- Domain: Eukaryota
- Kingdom: Animalia
- Phylum: Arthropoda
- Class: Insecta
- Order: Lepidoptera
- Family: Depressariidae
- Genus: Depressaria
- Species: D. nemolella

Binomial name
- Depressaria nemolella Svensson, 1982

= Depressaria nemolella =

Species of moth

Depressaria nemolella is a moth of the family Depressariidae. It is found in Sweden, where it is listed as critically endangered. It is only known from its type locality on eastern Gotland, and from three localities along the coast in the Stockholm and Uppsala counties.

The wingspan is 20–25 mm. Adults are on wing from June to July.

The larvae feed on Seseli libanotis.
