= Depressaria rhodoscelis =

Scientific classification
- Kingdom: Animalia
- Phylum: Arthropoda
- Class: Insecta
- Order: Lepidoptera
- Family: Depressariidae
- Genus: Depressaria
- Species: D. rhodoscelis

Binomial name
- Depressaria rhodoscelis Meyrick, 1920

Species of moth

Depressaria rhodoscelis is a moth in the family Depressariidae. It was described by Edward Meyrick in 1920. It is found in South Africa.

The wingspan is about 22 mm. The forewings are pale ochreous with a few scattered black scales and a small blackish subdorsal mark near the base, as well as a faint fuscous median streak from the base to the end of the cell, and cloudy light fuscous lines along veins 4-8, the other veins faintly tinged with fuscous. The first discal stigma is minute and black, the second represented by a white dot surrounded by a few black scales. There is a series of small indistinct blackish marginal dots around the posterior part of the costa and termen. The hindwings are light grey, whitish tinged towards the base, the apex darker.
