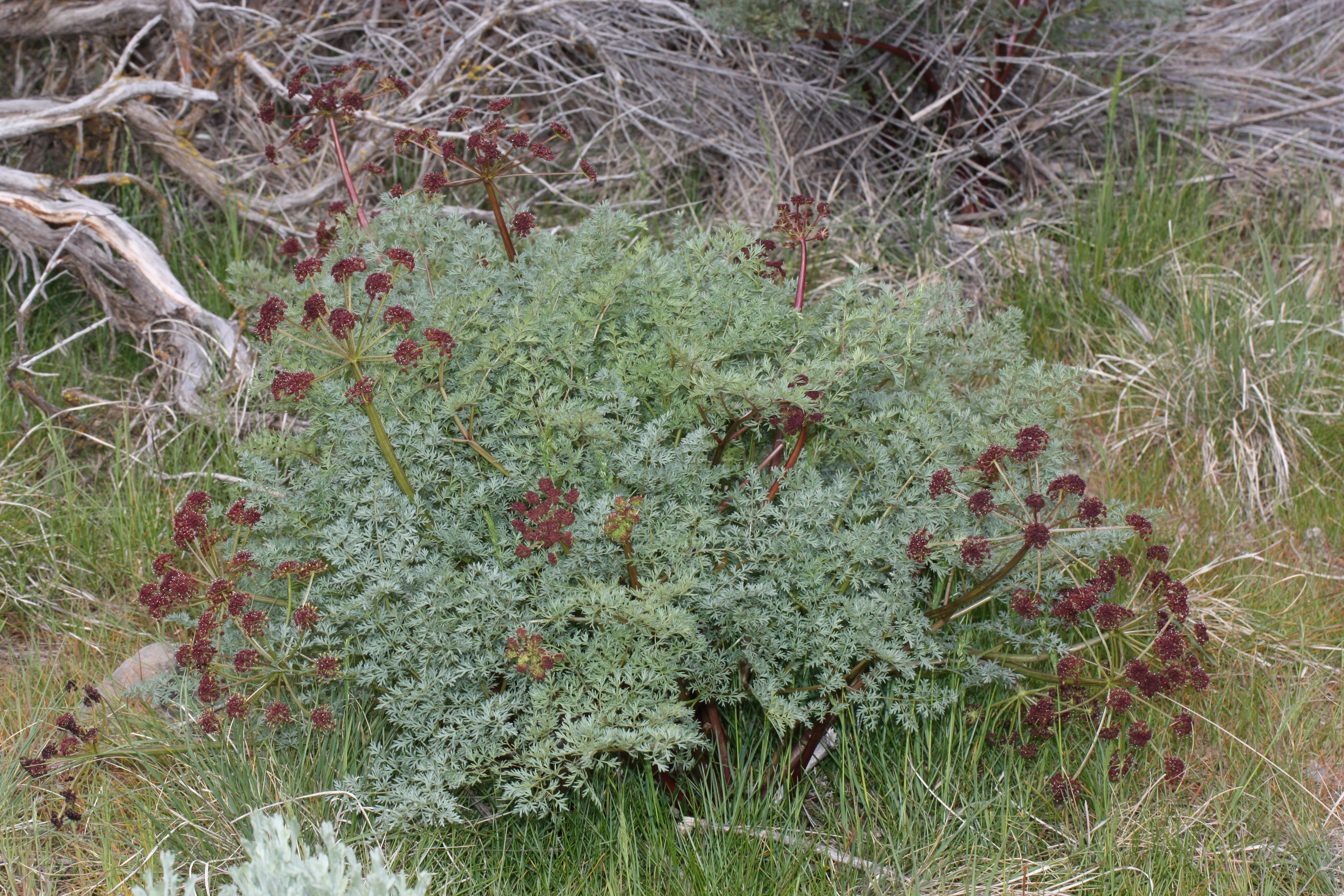
- In Wenas Wildlife Area

Conservation status
- Apparently Secure (NatureServe)

Scientific classification
- Kingdom: Plantae
- Clade: Tracheophytes
- Clade: Angiosperms
- Clade: Eudicots
- Clade: Asterids
- Order: Apiales
- Family: Apiaceae
- Genus: Lomatium
- Species: L. dissectum

Binomial name
- Lomatium dissectum (Nutt. ex Torr. & A.Gray) Mathias & Constance

= Lomatium dissectum =

Species of flowering plant

Lomatium dissectum is a species of flowering plant in the carrot family known by the common names fernleaf biscuitroot, fernleaf desert parsley, carrotleaf biscuitroot, chocolate tips and coastal chocolate-tips

== Description ==
It is a perennial herb reaching up to 1.2 metres (3 ft 11 in) tall, growing from a thick taproot. The leaves are mostly attached near the base of the plant, spreading with petioles up to 30 centimetres (12 in) long and large blades divided into many small, narrow segments. The inflorescence is an umbel of many small yellow, purple, or reddish flowers, each cluster on a leafless stem up to 10 cm long. The fruits resemble pumpkin seeds. Screening tests have been performed on root extracts of L. dissectum to assess its activity against viruses and bacteria.

== Distribution and range ==
Lomatium dissectum is native to much of western North America, where it grows in varied habitat. It is found in coastal areas west of the Cascade Range (var. dissectum), the eastern slopes of the Cascade Range, Rocky Mountains, Klamath Mountains, eastern Transverse Ranges and the Sierra Nevada in California.

== Taxonomy ==
There are two varieties recognized, which have been treated as separate species (L. multifidum and L. dissectum) and as varieties of single species (L. dissectum var. multifidum and L. dissectum var. dissectum). In regions where both taxa co-occur, L. dissectum is still in flower when L. multifidum is producing fruit.

- Lomatium dissectum var. multifidum (Nutt.) R.P. McNeill & Darrach – throughout western North America; interior British Columbia, Alberta, Saskatchewan, Arizona, California, Colorado, Idaho, Montana, Nevada, Oregon, Utah, Washington, Wyoming – south-facing slopes of shallow, rocky soil sites, at lower elevations – well-developed stalks, with yellow flowers.
- Lomatium dissectum var. dissectum (Nutt.) Mathias & Constance – west of the Cascade Range; coastal British Columbia (southeastern Vancouver Island and adjacent Gulf Islands) California, Oregon, Washington, disjunct in Idaho – north-facing slopes of deep soil sites, at higher elevations – short-stalked or stalkless, with purple flowers (rarely yellow/purple).

Lomatium dissectum var. dissectum is considered imperilled in Canada, occurring in 20 or fewer extant locations.

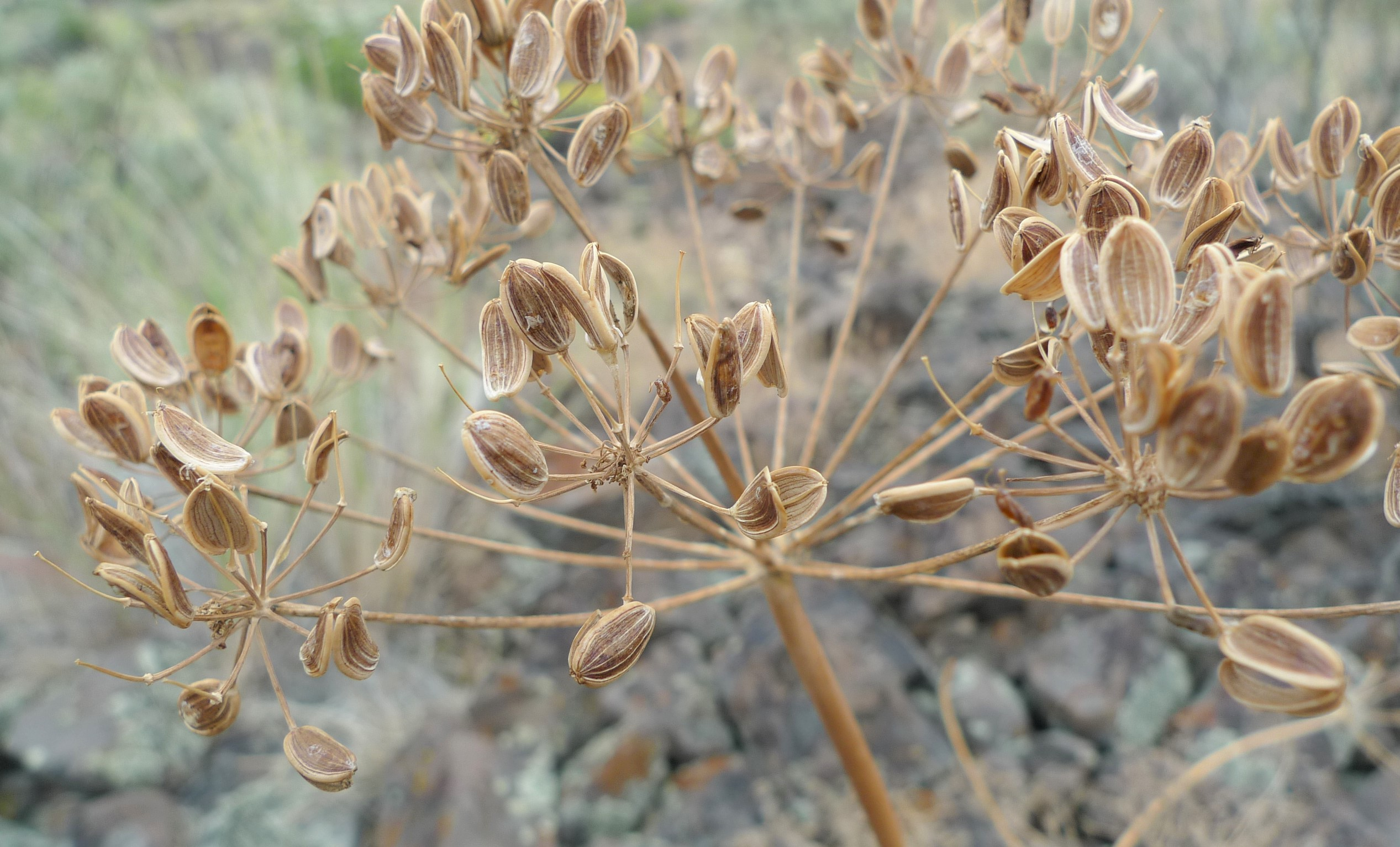
Mature seeds of var. multifidum

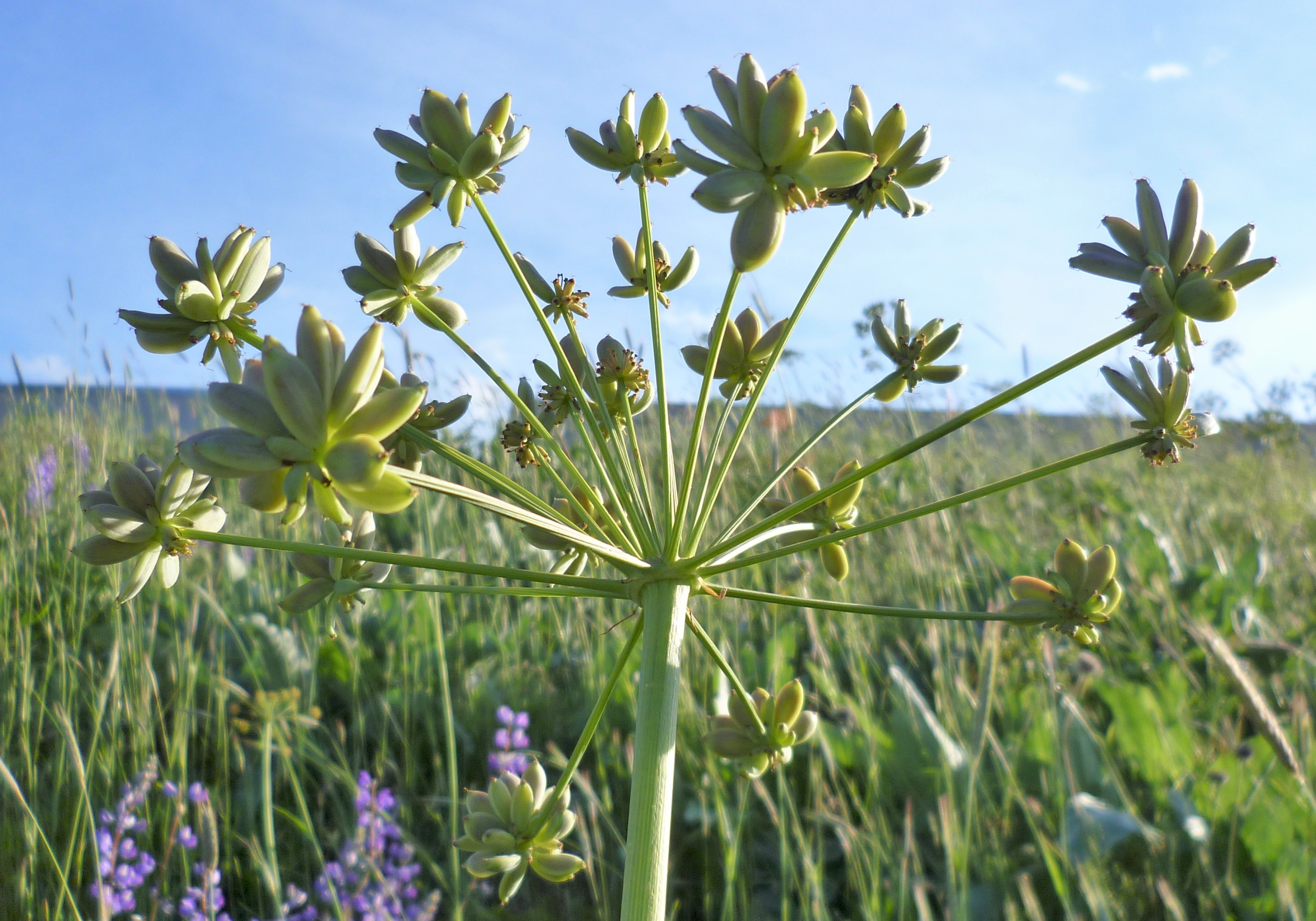
Green seeds of var. dissectum
