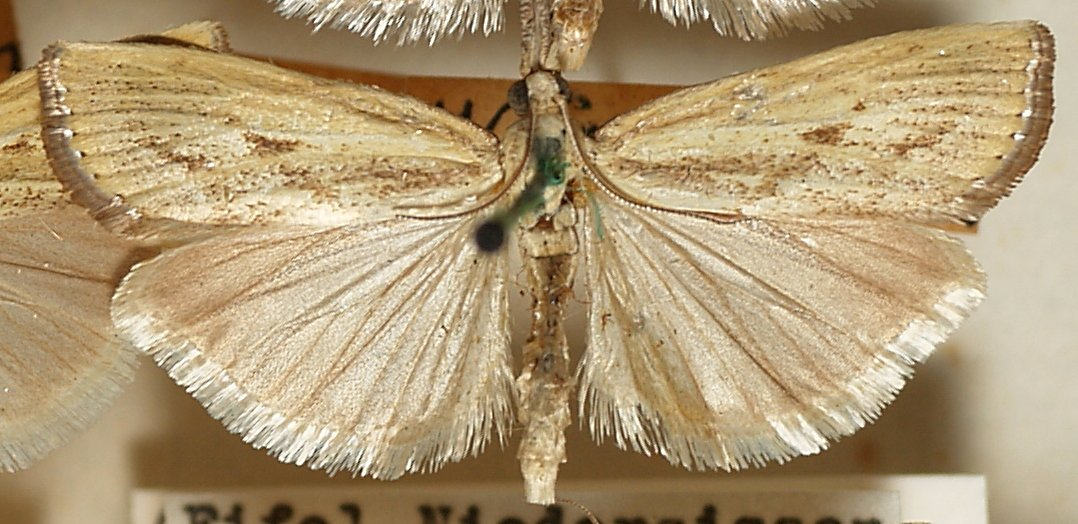
- Adult, museum specimen
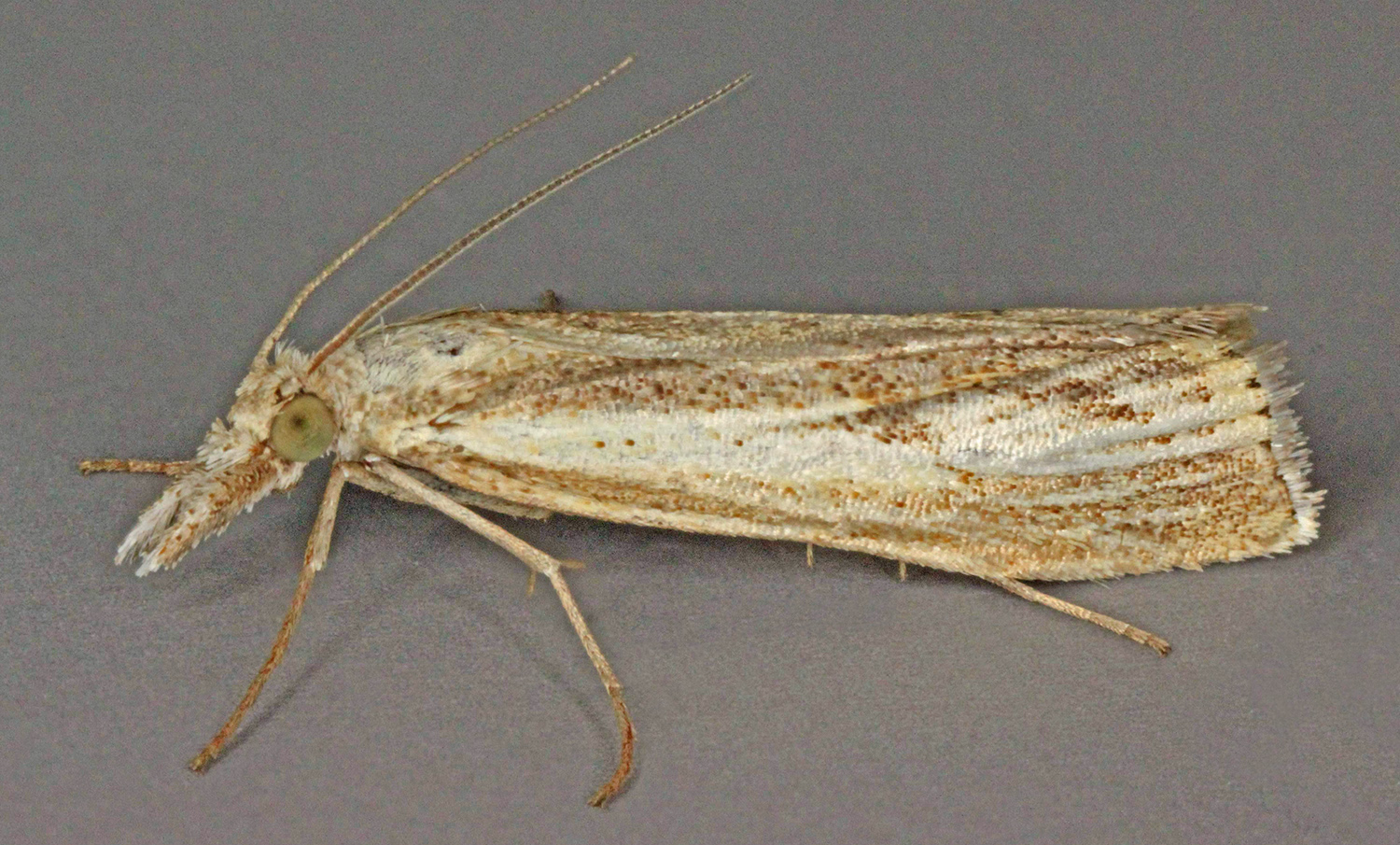

Scientific classification
- Kingdom: Animalia
- Phylum: Arthropoda
- Clade: Pancrustacea
- Class: Insecta
- Order: Lepidoptera
- Family: Crambidae
- Genus: Agriphila
- Species: A. inquinatella

Binomial name
- Agriphila inquinatella (Denis & Schiffermüller, 1775)

Synonyms
- Argiphila inquinatella (lapsus); Crambus elbursellus Zerny, 1939; Crambus inquinatellus (Denis & Schiffermüller, 1775); Pediasia inquinatalis Hübner, [1825]; Tinea arbustella Schrank, 1802; Tinea inquinatella Denis & Schiffermüller, 1775

= Agriphila inquinatella =

Species of moth

The name Agriphila inquinatella has been misapplied to some related species in the past; see below for details.

Agriphila inquinatella is a small moth species of the family Crambidae. It is found in Europe, around the Caucasus area to Turkestan, and in the Near East to Jordan. The type locality is in Austria.

Three subspecies are accepted today:

- Agriphila inquinatella inquinatella (Denis & Schiffermüller, 1775) – most of the range
- Agriphila inquinatella nevadensis (Caradja, 1910) – Sierra Nevada and presumably elsewhere in Spain
- Agriphila inquinatella elbursella (Zerny, 1939) – Alborz mountains and presumably elsewhere in the Caucasus region

Their wingspan is 23–29 mm. Similar to Agriphila geniculea and Agriphila tolli. The forewing ground colour is cream to straw brown.The forewing has scattered black scales and the veins are widely marked whitish.There is a distinctive dark stain on dorsal side of the discal cell (and on the upper edge of the angled median streak).The outer cross-line is broken by projections of the median streak. There is a single row of black sub-terminal dots. The cilia are grey. In the similar A. geniculea the lines are strongly angled and the cilia glossy or metallic. Meyrick - Face with sharp cone. Forewings light yellow-ochreous, somewhat mixed with pale brownish, with scattered dark fuscous scales, sometimes more or less wholly suffused with rather dark brown; veins suffusedly paler or whitish-ochreous, especially median; angulated median and second lines indistinct, brownish, marked with dark fuscous below middle; a terminal series of black dots; cilia rather dark shining fuscous, in female paler. Hindwings grey. Larva dull grey-greenish to purplish-brown; spots large, darker; head dark brown or blackish.

The caterpillars feed mainly on Poaceae grasses, such as meadow-grass species (Poa) or sheep's fescue (Festuca ovina) in silken galleries. They can be found under pebbles adjacent to their food plants, suggesting that they feed on the plants' roots. A more unusual food plant is the Pottiales moss Tortula muralis.

== Misidentifications involving this species ==
Apart from the junior synonyms listed, two scientific names have been misapplied to this species in the past:

- Crambus luteellus, used by James Francis Stephens in 1834, William Wood in 1839, and Stanisław Błeszyński in 1955 – actually a junior synonym of Pediasia luteella
- Palparia rorea, used by Adrian Hardy Haworth in 1811 – actually a lapsus for Palparia rorella, junior synonym of Chrysocrambus craterellus craterellus

In turn, the present species' scientific name was erroneously used for the related moths Pediasia contaminella (by Jacob Hübner in 1817), Agriphila geniculea (by J.F. Stephens in 1834 and W. Wood in 1839), Pediasia aridella (by Philipp Christoph Zeller in 1839), and Agriphila brioniella (by Aristide Caradja in 1910 and Alexander Kirilow Drenowski in 1923).
