= Agriphila beieri =

Scientific classification
- Kingdom: Animalia
- Phylum: Arthropoda
- Clade: Pancrustacea
- Class: Insecta
- Order: Lepidoptera
- Family: Crambidae
- Genus: Agriphila
- Species: A. beieri

Binomial name
- Agriphila beieri Błeszyński, 1953

Synonyms
- Agriphila dalmatinella beieri Błeszyński, 1955

Species of moth

Agriphila beieri is a species of moth in the family Crambidae. It was described by Stanisław Błeszyński in 1953. It is found on Crete and Cyprus, as well as in Russia, Armenia, Central Asia, Turkey, Syria, Iraq and Iran.

== Subspecies ==
There are two subspecies:

- Agriphila beieri beieri
- Agriphila beieri josifovi Ganev, 1985 (Turkey)

== Taxonomy ==
Agriphila beieri was originally described as a subspecies of Agriphila dalmatinella. The species is sometimes treated as a subspecies of Agriphila tolli.
