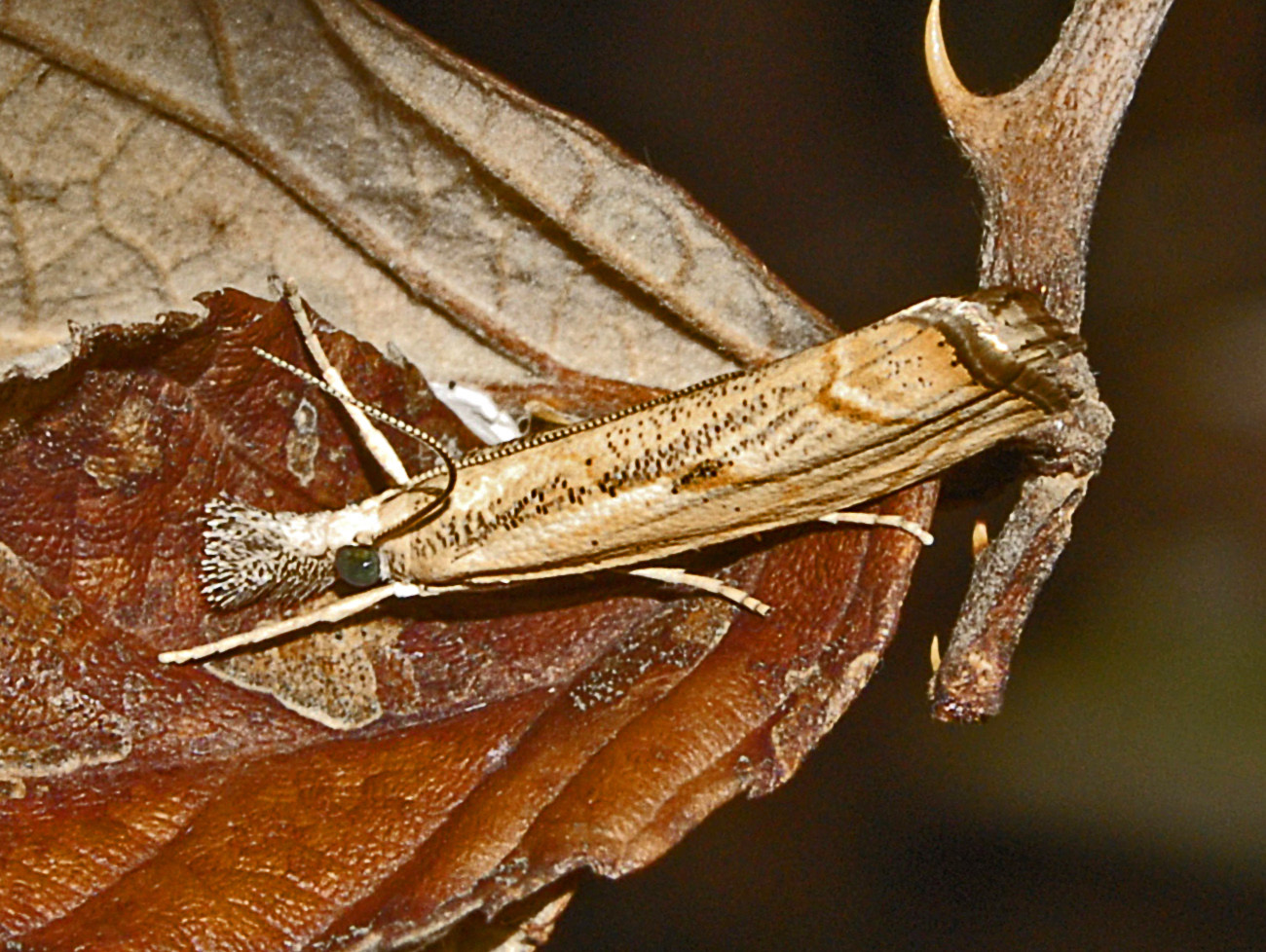

Scientific classification
- Kingdom: Animalia
- Phylum: Arthropoda
- Clade: Pancrustacea
- Class: Insecta
- Order: Lepidoptera
- Family: Crambidae
- Genus: Agriphila
- Species: A. geniculea

Binomial name
- Agriphila geniculea (Haworth, 1811)

Synonyms
- Palparia geniculea Haworth, 1811; Agriphila geniculea andalusiellus (Caradja, 1910); Crambus angulatellus Duponchel, 1836; Crambus suspectellus Zeller, 1839; Tinea imistella Hübner, 1813

= Agriphila geniculea =

Species of moth

Agriphila geniculea, the elbow-striped grass-veneer, is a species of moth of the family Crambidae. It was first described by Adrian Hardy Haworth in 1811.

== Subspecies ==
- Agriphila geniculea geniculea (Haworth, 1811) (Europe, Algeria)
- Agriphila geniculea andalusiella (Caradja, 1910) (Spain, southern France, southern Italy, north-western Africa)

== Distribution and habitat ==
This species can be found in most of Europe and parts of North Africa. It usually occurs in dry pastures, grassy area, sand-dunes, gardens and grassland.

== Description ==
The wingspan is 20–26 mm. The forewings usually show two strongly curved cross-lines, but sometimes these lines are not visible.

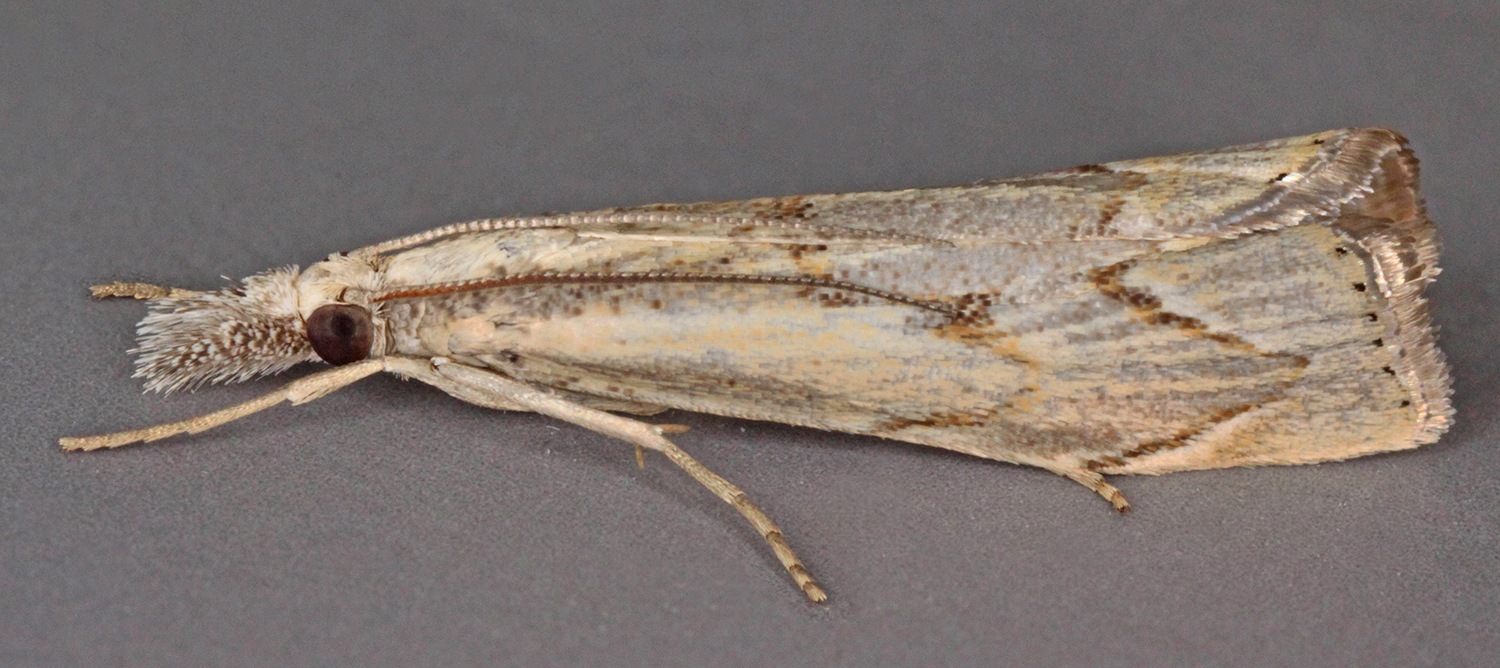
Agriphila geniculea

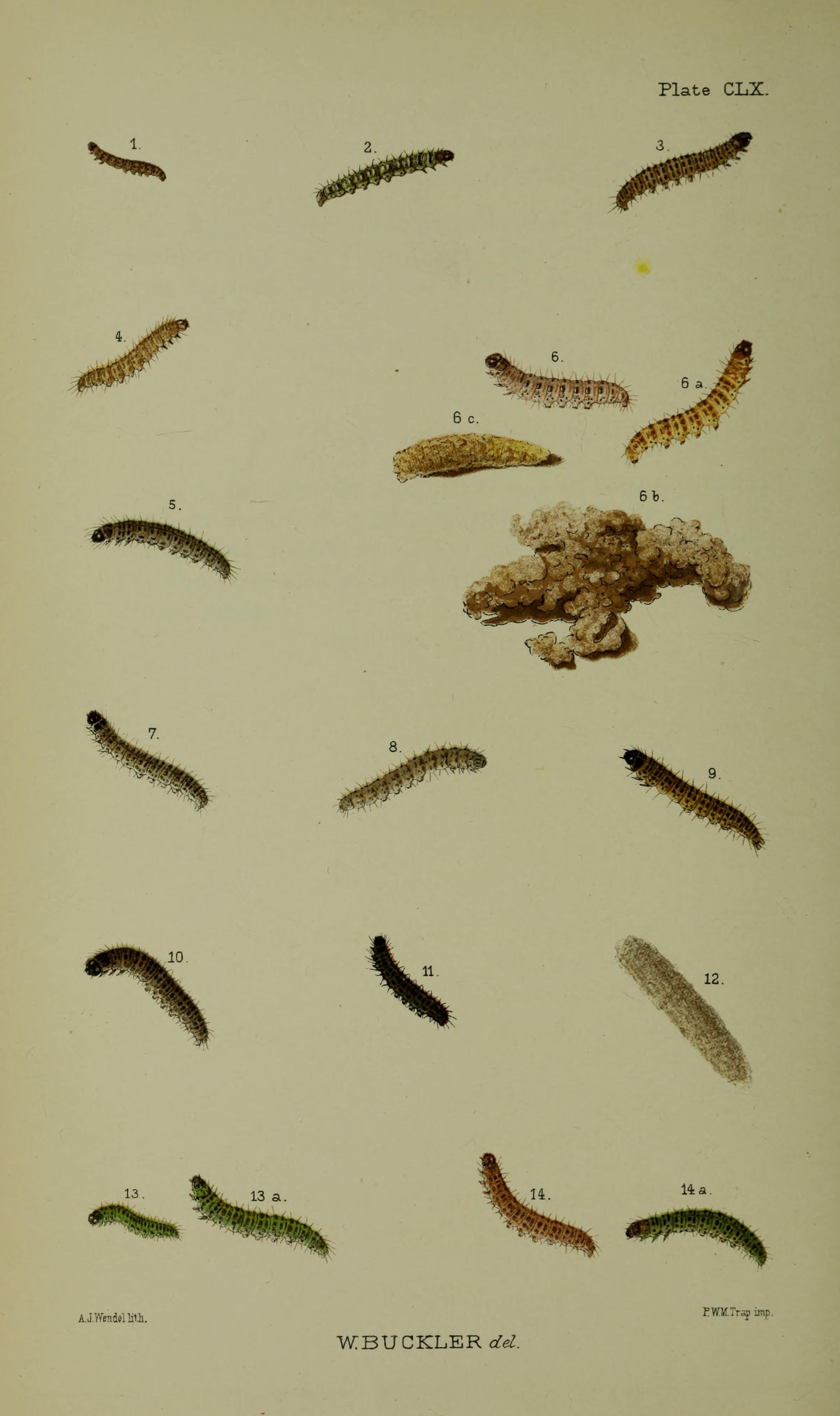
Figs. 7 larva after final moult

This species is very similar to Agriphila tolli and Agriphila inquinatella. It can be distinguished from the first on the basis of the higher distance that separates said cross-lines. Moreover, in A. geniculea the forewings are crossed by a couple of chevrons, while A. inquinatella is longitudinally variably streaked.

== Biology ==
The species has one generation. The moth flies at dusk from July to October depending on the location. When disturbed they come to light. The larvae can be found from late September to early May, as they winter in the larval stage. They feed within stems of Festuca ovina and various other grasses. They inhabit silken galleries, camouflaged with excrement, at the base of small grasses. Sometimes they leave these galleries and curl themselves tightly in a coil along the stem-bases of grasses.

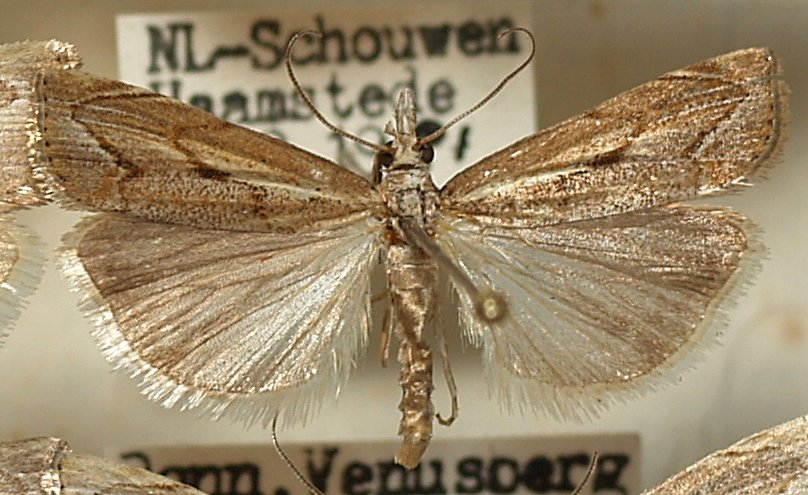
Mounted specimen
