= Agriphila sakayehamana =

Scientific classification
- Kingdom: Animalia
- Phylum: Arthropoda
- Clade: Pancrustacea
- Class: Insecta
- Order: Lepidoptera
- Family: Crambidae
- Genus: Agriphila
- Species: A. sakayehamana

Binomial name
- Agriphila sakayehamana (Matsumura, 1925)

Synonyms
- Crambus sakayehamana Matsumura, 1925; Crambus sakeyehamanus Błeszyński & Collins, 1962

Species of moth

Agriphila sakayehamana is a moth in the family Crambidae. It was described by Shōnen Matsumura in 1925. It is found in Russia's Sakhalinisland and Japan.
