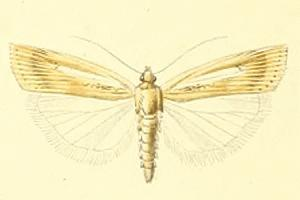

Scientific classification
- Kingdom: Animalia
- Phylum: Arthropoda
- Clade: Pancrustacea
- Class: Insecta
- Order: Lepidoptera
- Family: Crambidae
- Genus: Agriphila
- Species: A. argentistrigellus

Binomial name
- Agriphila argentistrigellus (Ragonot, 1888)

Synonyms
- Crambus argentistrigellus Ragonot, 1888; Agriphila argentistrigella; Agriphila monica Bleszynski, 1956; Crambus libystidellus Turati, 1924; Crambus lybistidellus Bleszynski & Collins, 1962; Crambus nebrodellus Zerny, 1943; Crambus argentistrigellus osseellus Hampson, 1900; Crambus osellus Hampson, 1896; Platytes bipunctellus D. Lucas, 1956

= Agriphila argentistrigellus =

Species of moth

Agriphila argentistrigellus is a species of moth in the family Crambidae. It is found in France, Spain and on Sicily, as well as in North Africa, including Morocco, Libya and Algeria.

The wingspan is about 25 mm.

== Subspecies ==
- Agriphila argentistrigellus argentistrigella
- Agriphila argentistrigellus osseella (Hampson, 1900) (Spain)
