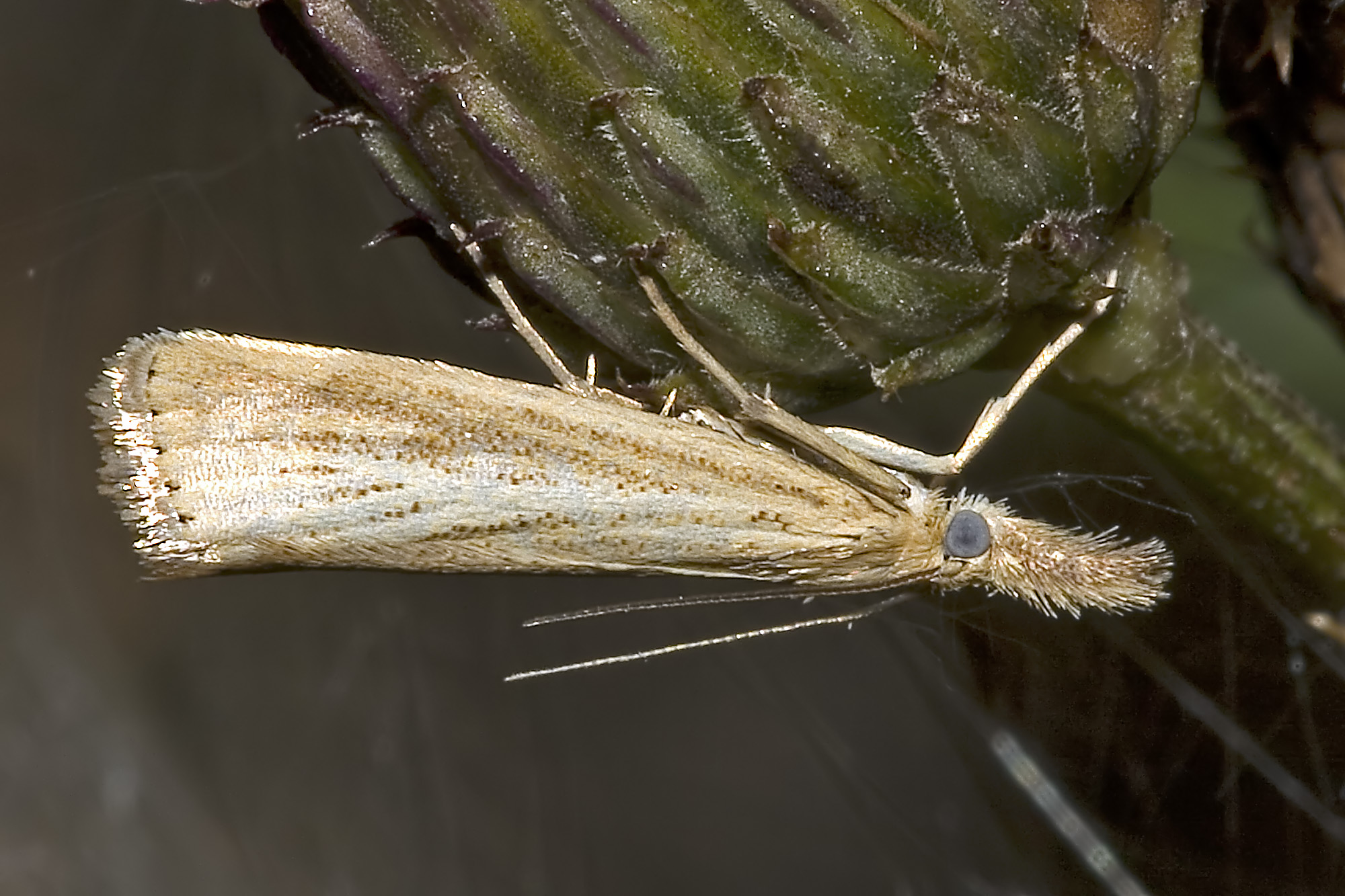

Scientific classification
- Domain: Eukaryota
- Kingdom: Animalia
- Phylum: Arthropoda
- Class: Insecta
- Order: Lepidoptera
- Family: Crambidae
- Genus: Agriphila
- Species: A. straminella

Binomial name
- Agriphila straminella (Denis & Schiffermüller, 1775)

Synonyms
- Tinea straminella Denis & Schiffermüller, 1775; Tinea marginellus Stephens, 1834; Agriphila culmella

= Agriphila straminella =

Species of moth

Agriphila straminella on Achillea

Agriphila straminella is a species of moth of the family Crambidae. It was described by Michael Denis and Ignaz Schiffermüller in 1775 and is found in Europe and east across the Palearctic.

The wingspan is 16–20 mm. The forewings are brown; a whitish median streak, ending in branches along veins 2-5, often separated by dark fuscous scales; dorsal 2/3 often wholly suffused with whitish-ochreous; a terminal series of black dots; cilia metallic. Hindwings are rather dark grey. The larva is pale pinkish-ochreous; spots brown; head and plate of 2 brown, darker-marked

The moth flies from June to September depending on the location.

The larvae feed on various grasses, such as sheep's fescue (Festuca ovina), smooth meadowgrass (Poa pratensis), and wheat (Triticum aestivum).
