= Agriphila costalipartella =

Scientific classification
- Kingdom: Animalia
- Phylum: Arthropoda
- Clade: Pancrustacea
- Class: Insecta
- Order: Lepidoptera
- Family: Crambidae
- Genus: Agriphila
- Species: A. costalipartella

Binomial name
- Agriphila costalipartella (Dyar, 1921)

Synonyms
- Crambus costalipartella Dyar, 1921; Agriphila costalipartellus

Species of moth

Agriphila costalipartella is a moth in the family Crambidae. It was described by Harrison Gray Dyar Jr. in 1921. It is found in North America, where it has been recorded from Arizona, California, Nevada and Montana.

The wingspan is about 24 mm. Adults have been recorded on wing from July to August.
