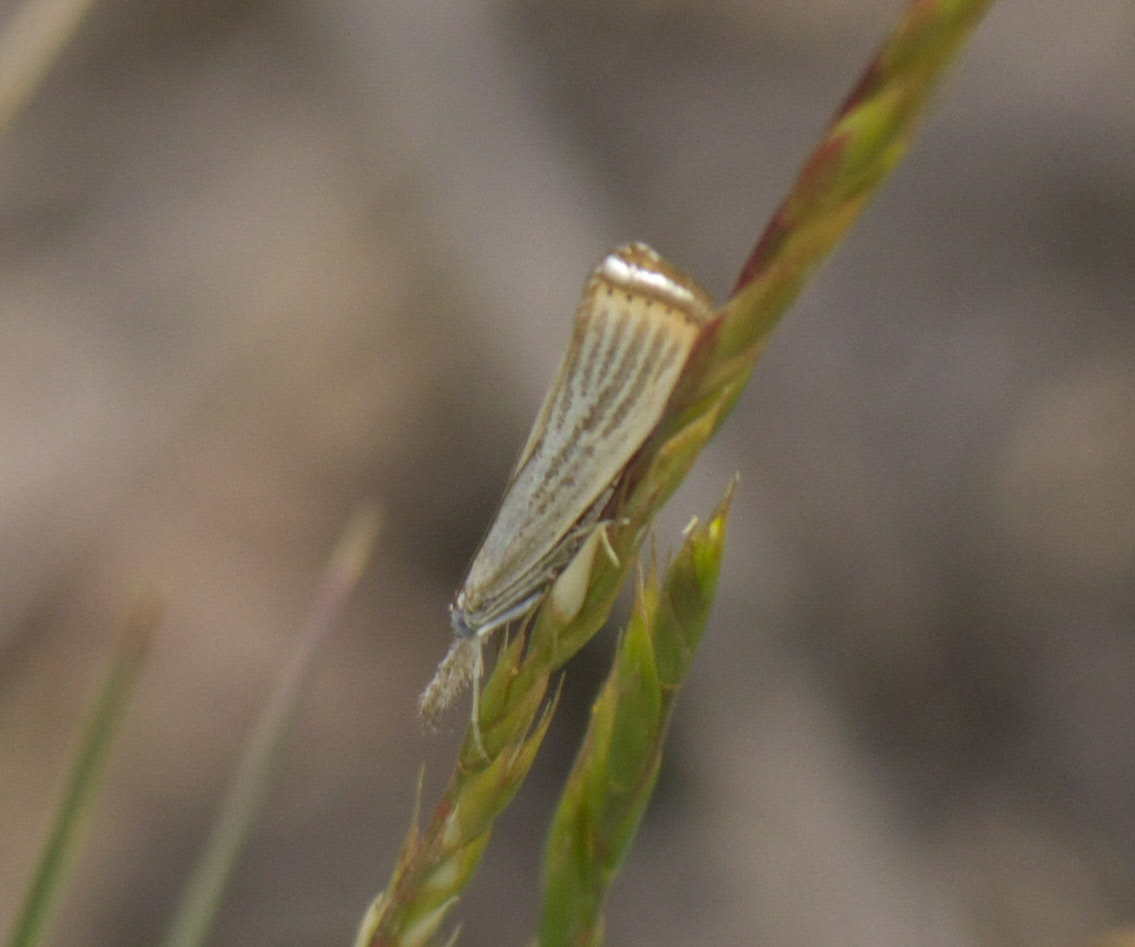

Scientific classification
- Kingdom: Animalia
- Phylum: Arthropoda
- Clade: Pancrustacea
- Class: Insecta
- Order: Lepidoptera
- Family: Crambidae
- Genus: Agriphila
- Species: A. plumbifimbriella

Binomial name
- Agriphila plumbifimbriella (Dyar, 1904)

Synonyms
- Crambus plumbifimbriellus Dyar, 1904; Agriphila plumbifimbriellus

= Agriphila plumbifimbriella =

Species of moth

Agriphila plumbifimbriella is a moth in the family Crambidae. It was described by Harrison Gray Dyar Jr. in 1904. It is found in North America, where it has been recorded from British Columbia, Alberta and the western United States. The habitat consists of grassland areas in mountains and foothills.

The larvae probably feed on the roots of grass species.
