= Agriphila undata =

Scientific classification
- Kingdom: Animalia
- Phylum: Arthropoda
- Clade: Pancrustacea
- Class: Insecta
- Order: Lepidoptera
- Family: Crambidae
- Genus: Agriphila
- Species: A. undata

Binomial name
- Agriphila undata (Grote, 1881)

Synonyms
- Crambus undatus Grote, 1881; Agriphila undatus

Species of moth

Agriphila undata is a moth in the family Crambidae. It was described by Augustus Radcliffe Grote in 1881. It is found in North America, where it has been recorded from California.

The wingspan is about 22 mm. Adults are on wing from September to October.
