= Agriphila impurella =

Scientific classification
- Kingdom: Animalia
- Phylum: Arthropoda
- Clade: Pancrustacea
- Class: Insecta
- Order: Lepidoptera
- Family: Crambidae
- Genus: Agriphila
- Species: A. impurella

Binomial name
- Agriphila impurella (Hampson, 1896)

Synonyms
- Crambus impurellus Hampson, 1896; Agriphila impurellus

Species of moth

Agriphila impurella is a moth in the family Crambidae. It was described by George Hampson in 1896. It is found in Afghanistan.
