= Agriphila bleszynskiella =

Scientific classification
- Kingdom: Animalia
- Phylum: Arthropoda
- Clade: Pancrustacea
- Class: Insecta
- Order: Lepidoptera
- Family: Crambidae
- Genus: Agriphila
- Species: A. bleszynskiella

Binomial name
- Agriphila bleszynskiella Amsel, 1961

Species of moth

Agriphila bleszynskiella is a moth in the family Crambidae. It was described by Hans Georg Amsel in 1961. It is found in Iran, Afghanistan, and Turkey.
