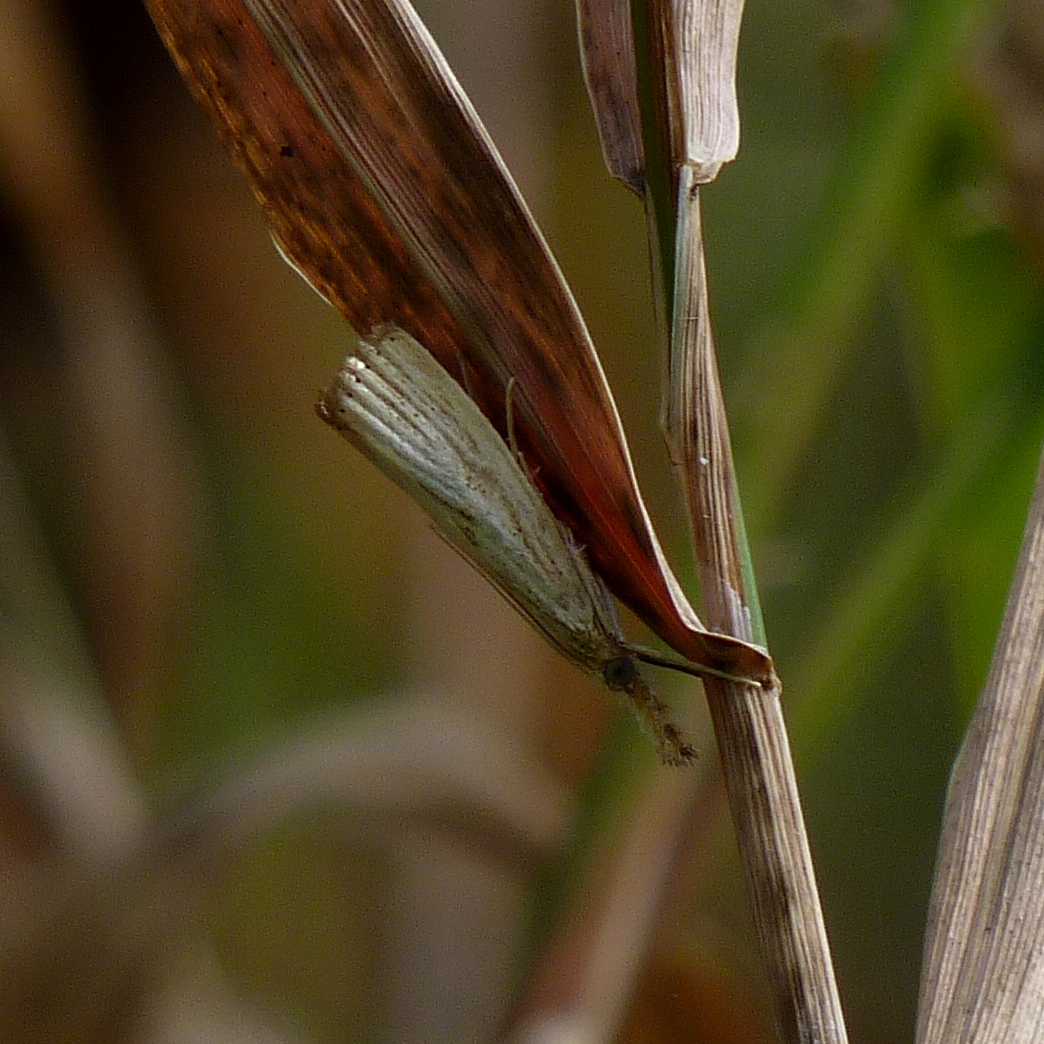

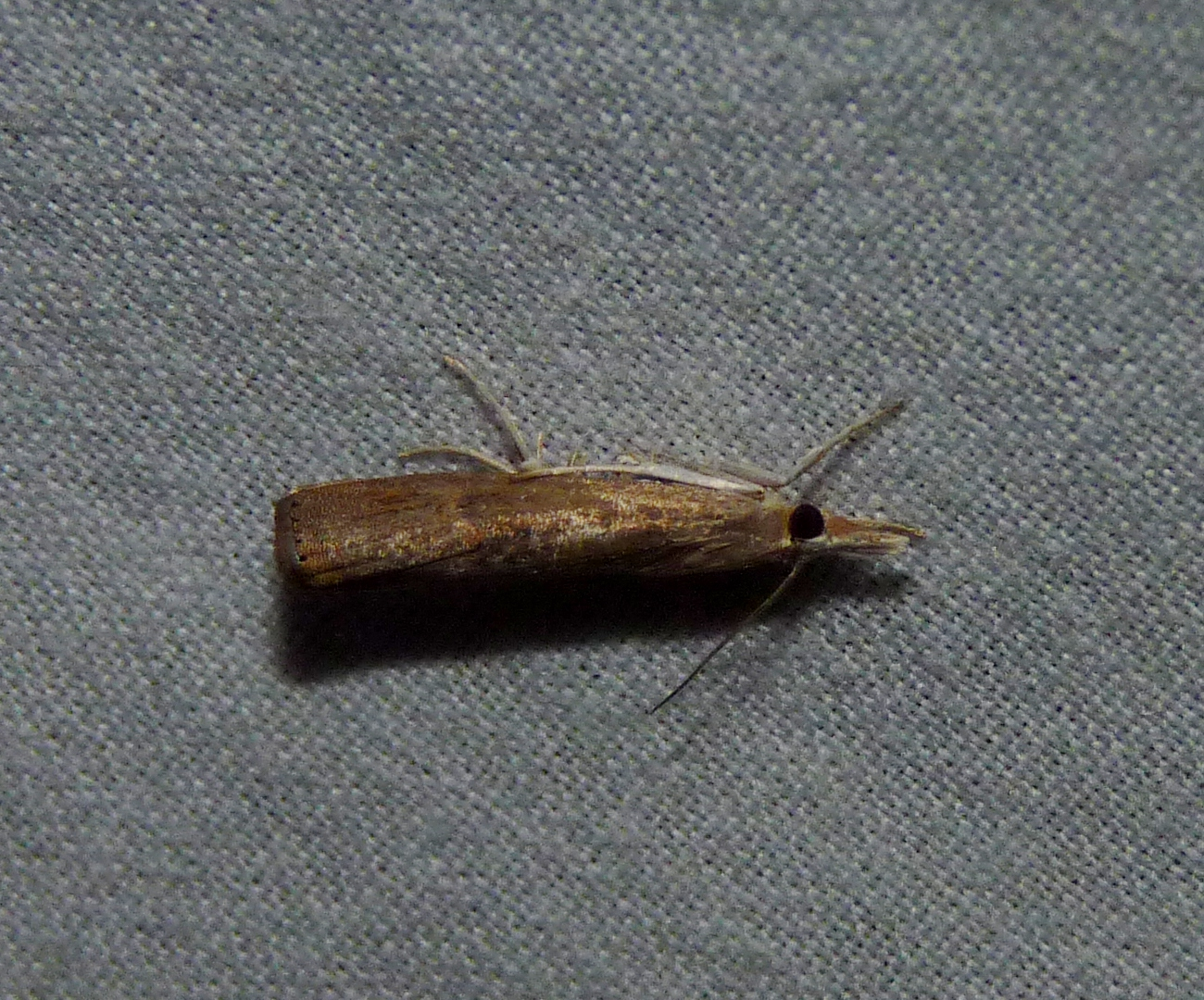

Scientific classification
- Kingdom: Animalia
- Phylum: Arthropoda
- Clade: Pancrustacea
- Class: Insecta
- Order: Lepidoptera
- Family: Crambidae
- Genus: Agriphila
- Species: A. vulgivagellus

Binomial name
- Agriphila vulgivagellus (Clemens, 1860)

Synonyms
- Crambus vulgivagellus Clemens, 1860; Crambus aurifimbrialis Walker, 1863; Crambus chalybirostris Zeller, 1863

= Agriphila vulgivagellus =

Species of moth

Agriphila vulgivagellus, the vagabond crambus or vagabond sod webworm, is a moth of the family Crambidae. It is found from Quebec and New England to Florida, west to Texas and north to Alberta.

The wingspan is 20–39 mm. Adults are on wing from August to October in one generation per year.

The larvae feed on various grasses, as well as wheat, rye and other grains. Immature larvae overwinter.
