= Agriphila argentea =

Scientific classification
- Kingdom: Animalia
- Phylum: Arthropoda
- Clade: Pancrustacea
- Class: Insecta
- Order: Lepidoptera
- Family: Crambidae
- Genus: Agriphila
- Species: A. argentea

Binomial name
- Agriphila argentea Bassi, 1999

Species of moth

Agriphila argentea is a moth in the family Crambidae. It was described by Graziano Bassi in 1999. It is found in Nepal.
