= Agriphila anceps =

Scientific classification
- Kingdom: Animalia
- Phylum: Arthropoda
- Clade: Pancrustacea
- Class: Insecta
- Order: Lepidoptera
- Family: Crambidae
- Genus: Agriphila
- Species: A. anceps

Binomial name
- Agriphila anceps (Grote, 1880)

Synonyms
- Crambus anceps Grote, 1880

Species of moth

Agriphila anceps is a moth in the family Crambidae. It was described by Augustus Radcliffe Grote in 1880. It is found in North America, where it has been recorded from California.
