= Agriphila gerinella =

Scientific classification
- Kingdom: Animalia
- Phylum: Arthropoda
- Clade: Pancrustacea
- Class: Insecta
- Order: Lepidoptera
- Family: Crambidae
- Genus: Agriphila
- Species: A. gerinella

Binomial name
- Agriphila gerinella P. Leraut, 2012

Species of moth

Agriphila gerinella is a moth in the family Crambidae. It was described by Patrice J.A. Leraut in 2012. It is found in Morocco.
