= Agriphila melike =

Scientific classification
- Kingdom: Animalia
- Phylum: Arthropoda
- Clade: Pancrustacea
- Class: Insecta
- Order: Lepidoptera
- Family: Crambidae
- Genus: Agriphila
- Species: A. melike

Binomial name
- Agriphila melike Kemal & Koçak, 2004

Synonyms
- Agriphila asiatica Ganev & Hacker, 1984 (preocc. Caradja, 1910)

Species of moth

Agriphila melike is a moth in the family Crambidae. It was described by Muhabbet Kemal and Ahmet Ömer Koçak in 2004. It is found in Turkey.
