= Agriphila atlanticus =

Scientific classification
- Kingdom: Animalia
- Phylum: Arthropoda
- Clade: Pancrustacea
- Class: Insecta
- Order: Lepidoptera
- Family: Crambidae
- Genus: Agriphila
- Species: A. atlanticus

Binomial name
- Agriphila atlanticus (Wollaston, 1858)

Synonyms
- Crambus atlanticus Wollaston, 1858; Agriphila atlantica

Species of moth

Agriphila atlanticus is a species of moth in the family Crambidae. It is found on Madeira.
