= Agriphila trabeatellus =

Scientific classification
- Kingdom: Animalia
- Phylum: Arthropoda
- Clade: Pancrustacea
- Class: Insecta
- Order: Lepidoptera
- Family: Crambidae
- Genus: Agriphila
- Species: A. trabeatellus

Binomial name
- Agriphila trabeatellus (Herrich-Schaffer, 1848)

Synonyms
- Crambus trabeatellus Herrich-Schaffer, 1848; Agriphila trabeatella; Crambus atlanticus var. canariensis Rebel, 1892; Crambus divisellus de Joannis in de Joannis & Ragonot, 1889

Species of moth

Agriphila trabeatellus is a species of moth in the family Crambidae. The species was described by Gottlieb August Wilhelm Herrich-Schäffer in 1848. It is found in France, Spain, Portugal, Italy, Greece and on Corsica, Sardinia, Sicily, Malta and Crete, as well as in Asia Minor, Lebanon, Algeria, Libya and the Canary Islands.

== Subspecies ==
- Agriphila trabeatellus trabeatellus (Europe, Algeria, Libya, Asia Minor, Lebanon)
- Agriphila trabeatellus canariensis (Rebel, 1892) (Canary Islands)
