= Agriphila hymalayensis =

Scientific classification
- Kingdom: Animalia
- Phylum: Arthropoda
- Clade: Pancrustacea
- Class: Insecta
- Order: Lepidoptera
- Family: Crambidae
- Genus: Agriphila
- Species: A. hymalayensis

Binomial name
- Agriphila hymalayensis Ganev, 1984

Species of insect

Agriphila hymalayensis is a moth in the family Crambidae. It was described by Julius Ganev in 1984. It is found in Pakistan and the south-western Himalayas.
