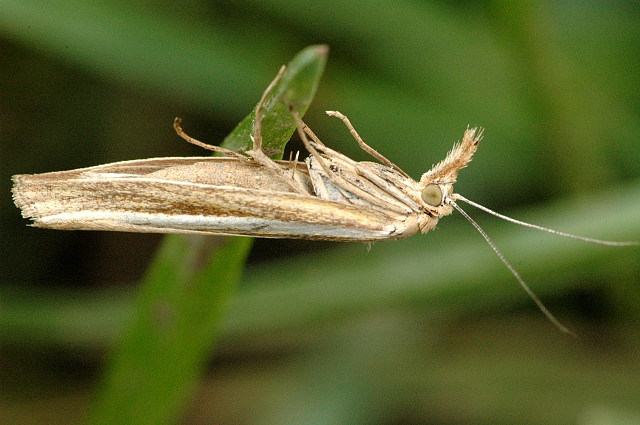

Scientific classification
- Kingdom: Animalia
- Phylum: Arthropoda
- Clade: Pancrustacea
- Class: Insecta
- Order: Lepidoptera
- Family: Crambidae
- Genus: Agriphila
- Species: A. latistria

Binomial name
- Agriphila latistria (Haworth, [1811])

Synonyms
- Palparia latistria Haworth, 1811; Crambus gueneellus Duponchel, 1836; Crambus monotaeniellus Herrich-Schäffer, 1852; Crambus vectifer Zeller, 1863; Agriphila Crambus vectifer fuscatellus (Turati, 1913); Agriphila latistria vallicolellus A. Costa, 1885

= Agriphila latistria =

Species of moth

Agriphila latistria is a species of moth of the family Crambidae. It is found in Europe, but originates from the area surrounding the Mediterranean Sea.

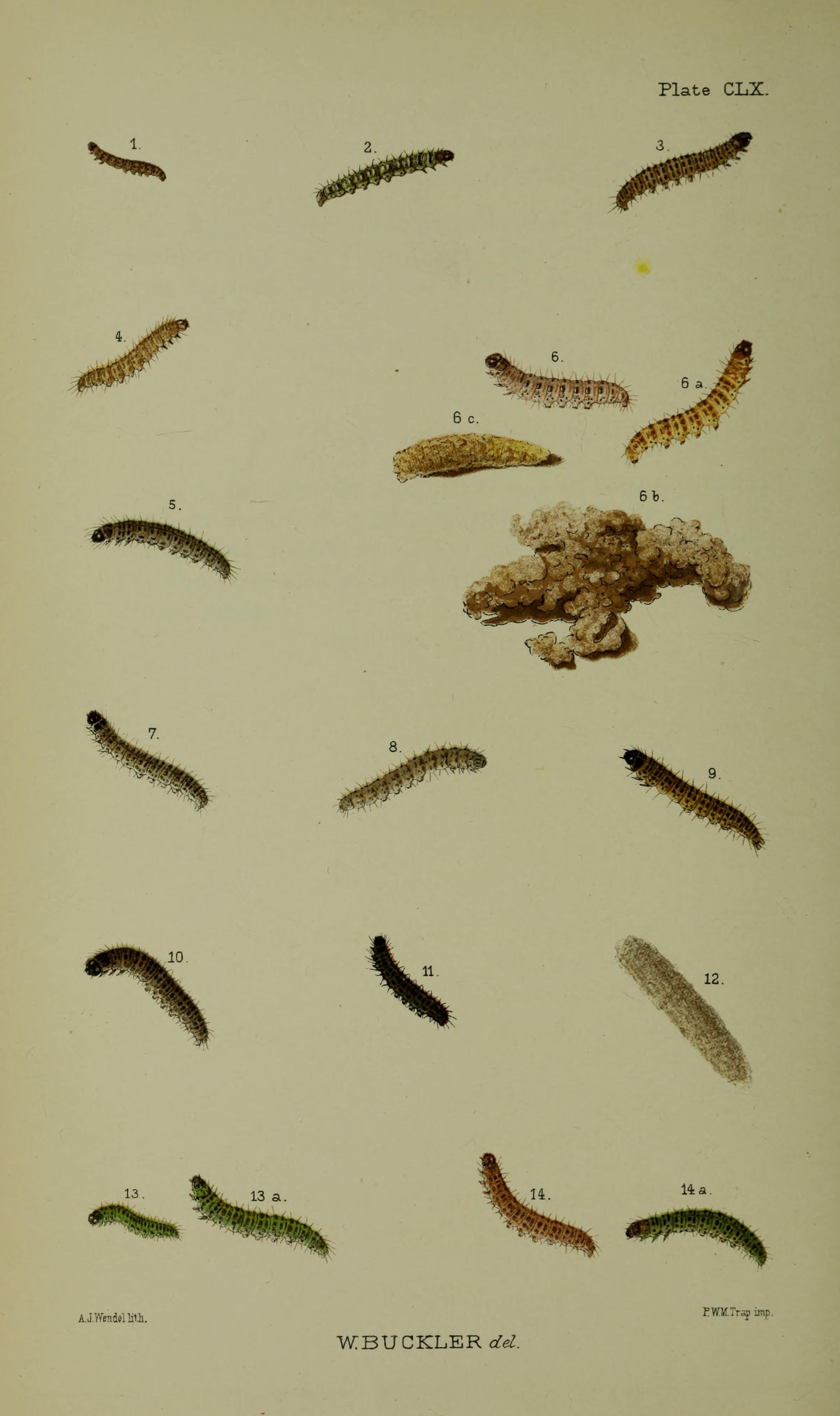
Fig.12 case of sand

The wingspan is 22–27 mm. The face has a strong sharp cone. Forewings light are ferruginous-brown tinged with grey; a shining white evenly broad median streak from base to termen, edged with dark fuscous scales; some blackish terminal dots:cilia shining fuscous, opposite median streak white. Hindwings are pale ochreous-grey.

The moth flies from July to September depending on the location.

The larvae feed on various grasses, especially Bromus species.
