= Agriphila biarmicus =

Scientific classification
- Kingdom: Animalia
- Phylum: Arthropoda
- Clade: Pancrustacea
- Class: Insecta
- Order: Lepidoptera
- Family: Crambidae
- Genus: Agriphila
- Species: A. biarmicus

Binomial name
- Agriphila biarmicus (Tengström, 1865)

Synonyms
- Crambus biarmicus Tengström, 1865; Agriphila biarmica; Agriphila biarmicus alpina Bleszynski, 1957; Crambus biarmicus var. pallidus Strand, 1900; Crambus biarmicus var. illatella Fuchs, 1902; Crambus biarmicus paganellus McDunnough, 1925

Species of moth

Agriphila biarmicus is a species of moth in the family Crambidae first described by Johan Martin Jakob von Tengström in 1865. It is found in Fennoscandia, north-western Russia, Estonia, Latvia and in the Alps of Switzerland, Austria and Italy. It is also found in Canada, including Alberta and Quebec.

The wingspan is about 19 mm for ssp. paganella and 12–13 mm for European subspecies.

== Subspecies ==
- Agriphila biarmicus biarmicus (Scandinavia, north-western Russia)
- Agriphila biarmicus illatella (Fuchs, 1902) (Scandinavia)
- Agriphila biarmicus alpina (Bleszynski, 1957) (Alps)
- Agriphila biarmicus paganella (McDunnough, 1925) (North America)
