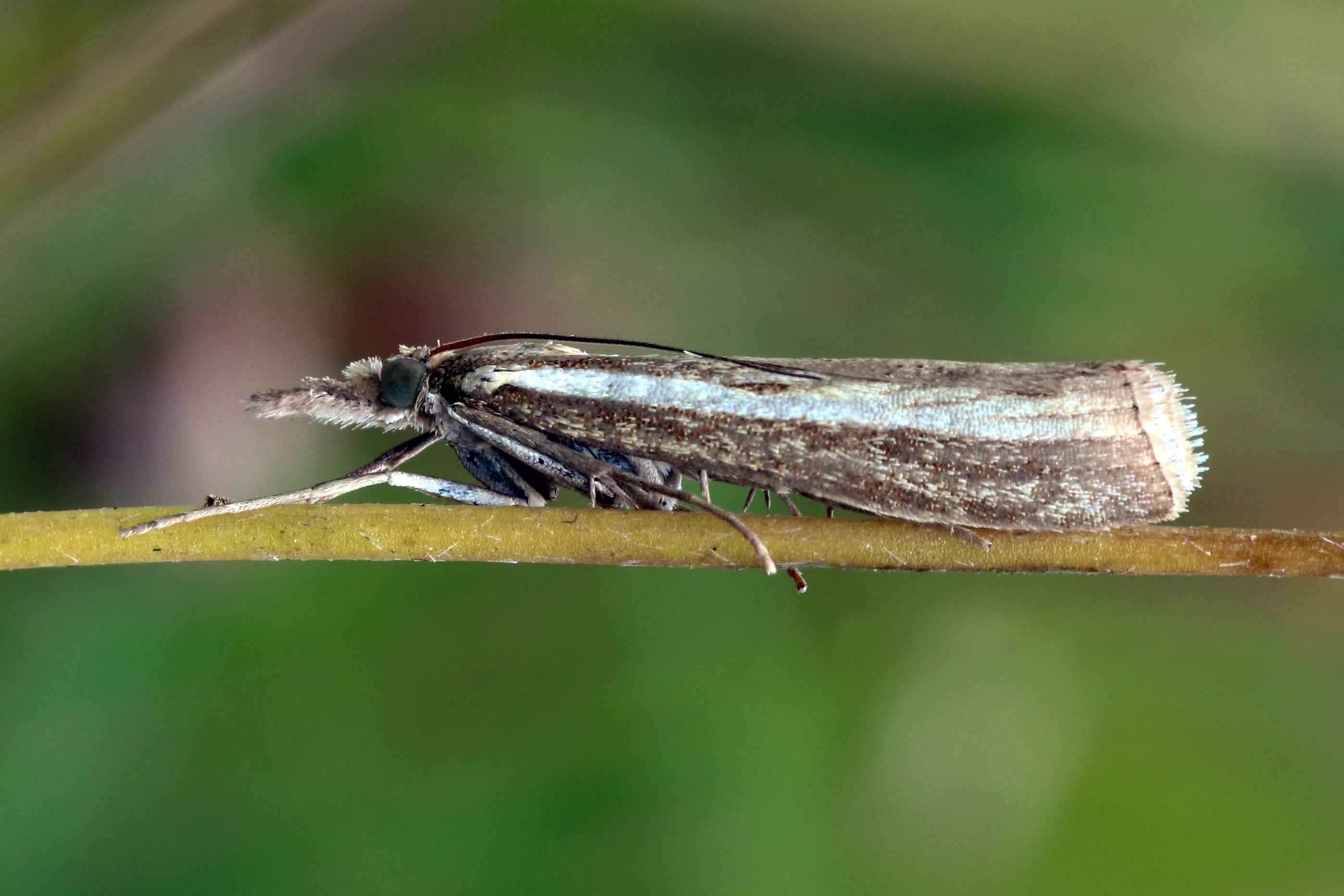

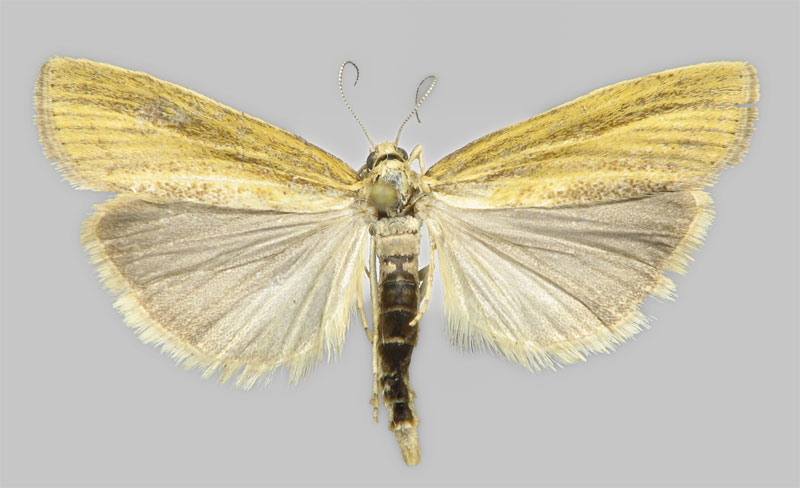

Scientific classification
- Kingdom: Animalia
- Phylum: Arthropoda
- Class: Insecta
- Order: Lepidoptera
- Family: Crambidae
- Genus: Agriphila
- Species: A. tristella

Binomial name
- Agriphila tristella ([Denis & Schiffermüller], 1775)

Synonyms
- List: Tinea ferruginella Thunberg, 1788; Tinea tristella Denis & Schiffermüller, 1775; Crambus discistrigatus Hampson, 1919; Crambus fuscelinellus Stephens, 1834; Crambus hertwigae Rasmussen, 1964; Crambus moerens Fabricius, 1798; Crambus nigristriellus Stephens, 1834; Agriphila tristella pseudotristellus (Zerny, 1943); Tinea aquilella Hübner, 1796; Tinea fuscinella Schrank, 1802; Tinea paleella Hübner, 1796

= Agriphila tristella =

Species of moth

Agriphila tristella, the common grass-veneer, is a species of moth of the family Crambidae found in Europe and Asia.

== Distribution and habitat ==
Agriphila tristella is found in grassy habitats. It occurs across Europe including the British Islands, as well as in Asia, including in Iran, north-western India, and Pakistan. Its type locality is in Austria.

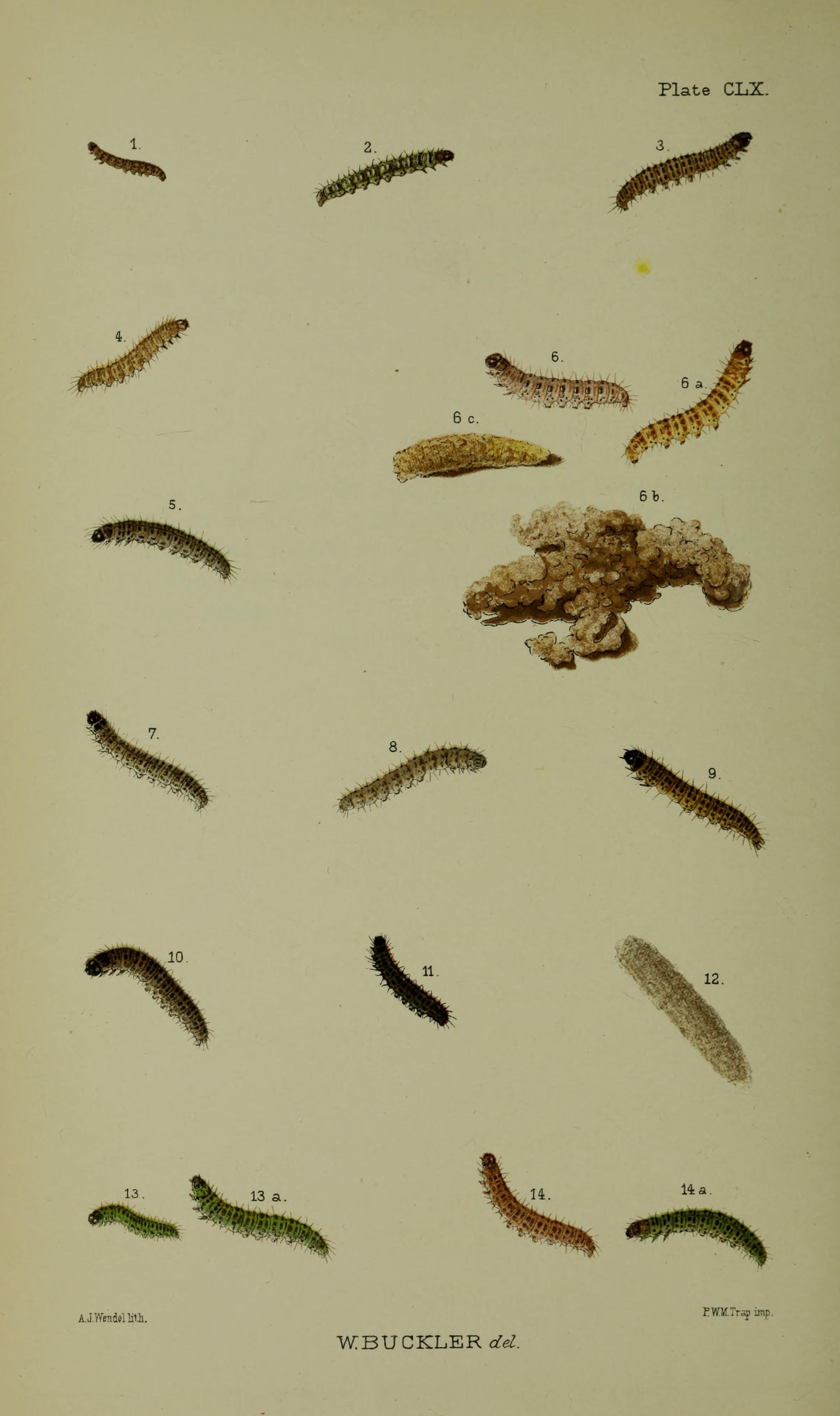
Fig. 10 larva after final moult

== Behaviour ==
In the UK, the moth flies from June to September. It is nocturnal and attracted to light.

The larvae feed on various grasses, such as Poa and Deschampsia species.

== Description ==
=== Handbook of British Lepidoptera ===
The following description of Agriphila tristella was published in Edward Meyrick's 1895 A Handbook of British Lepidoptera:

The wingspan is 22–30 mm. The face has a short cone. Forewings are pale or deep yellow-ochreous, often mixed and sometimes wholly suffused with dark brown; median vein and lb pale or whitish; second line indistinctly brownish, acutely angulated, sometimes obsolete; sometimes some indistinct blackish terminal dots; cilia shining whitish-ochreous to fuscous. Hindwings are grey. The larva is pale ochreous or brownish; spots large, blackish-brown; head and plate of 2 black

— Edward Meyrick

See also Parsons et al.
