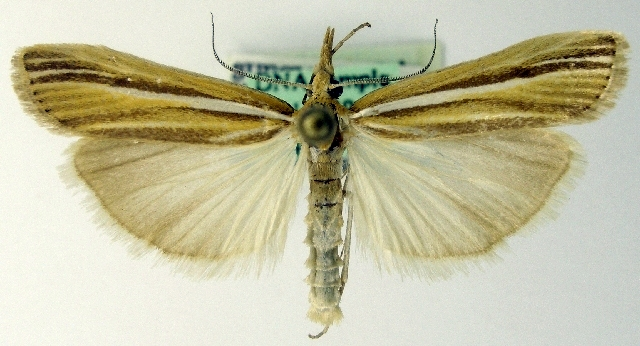

Scientific classification
- Kingdom: Animalia
- Phylum: Arthropoda
- Clade: Pancrustacea
- Class: Insecta
- Order: Lepidoptera
- Family: Crambidae
- Genus: Agriphila
- Species: A. deliella

Binomial name
- Agriphila deliella (Hübner, 1813)

Synonyms
- Tinea deliella Hübner, [1813]; Agriphila hispanodeliella Bleszynski, 1959; Agriphila deliella f. clarella Krulikovsky, 1908; Agriphila deliella f. unicolorella Klemensiewicz, 1901; Agriphila deliella f. aszneri Szent-Ivány, 1942

= Agriphila deliella =

Species of moth

Agriphila deliella is a species of moth of the family Crambidae. It is found in most of Europe and North Africa and from Anatolia to Afghanistan.

The wingspan is 16–20 mm. There is one generation per year with adults on wing from August to September.

The larvae feed on various Poaceae species, including Corynephorus canescens, Carex arenaria and Molinia caerulea.

== Subspecies ==
- Agriphila deliella deliella (Europe, Asia Minor, Transcaucasus, North Africa, Algeria, Afghanistan)
- Agriphila deliella hispanodeliella Bleszynski, 1959 (Spain)
- Agriphila deliella asiatica Caradja, 1910 (Iran)
