= Agriphila cernyi =

Scientific classification
- Kingdom: Animalia
- Phylum: Arthropoda
- Clade: Pancrustacea
- Class: Insecta
- Order: Lepidoptera
- Family: Crambidae
- Genus: Agriphila
- Species: A. cernyi

Binomial name
- Agriphila cernyi Ganev, 1985

Species of moth

Agriphila cernyi is a moth in the family Crambidae. It was described by Julius Ganev in 1985. It is found in Mongolia.
