= Agriphila cyrenaicellus =

Scientific classification
- Kingdom: Animalia
- Phylum: Arthropoda
- Clade: Pancrustacea
- Class: Insecta
- Order: Lepidoptera
- Family: Crambidae
- Genus: Agriphila
- Species: A. cyrenaicellus

Binomial name
- Agriphila cyrenaicellus (Ragonot, 1887)

Synonyms
- Crambus cyrenaicellus Ragonot, 1887; Agriphila cyrenaicella; Crambus alexandriensis Bethune-Baker, 1894; Crambus permixtellus Kalchberg, 1897

Species of moth

Agriphila cyrenaicellus is a species of moth in the family Crambidae. It is found in southern Europe; (Note: in Spain, Portugal, Greece, and on Sardinia, Sicily and Crete) in the Middle East; (Note: on Cyprus, and in Iraq, Iran, Israel, Jordan, Libya and Syria) in northern Africa; (Note: in Tunisia and Egypt) and in Central Asia.

The wingspan is about 22 mm.
