= Agriphila aeneociliella =

Scientific classification
- Kingdom: Animalia
- Phylum: Arthropoda
- Clade: Pancrustacea
- Class: Insecta
- Order: Lepidoptera
- Family: Crambidae
- Genus: Agriphila
- Species: A. aeneociliella

Binomial name
- Agriphila aeneociliella (Eversmann, 1844)

Synonyms
- Chilo aeneociliella Eversmann, 1844; Crambus aeniociliellus Hampson, 1896; Crambus bivitellus Schille in Romaniszyn & Schille, 1930; Crambus bivittellus Wileman, 1911; Crambus brivittellus Klemensiewicz, 1898; Crambus quadrifidellus Lederer, 1863; Crambus trifidalis Wileman, 1911; Crambus tristellus ab. brivitellus Klemensiewicz, 1898

Species of moth

Agriphila aeneociliella, the eastern grass veneer, is a species of moth in the family Crambidae. It is found from Denmark, Poland, Ukraine and Romania through Russia to Manchuria, northern China, Korea and Japan.

The wingspan is 10–12 mm.
