= Agriphila paleatellus =

Scientific classification
- Kingdom: Animalia
- Phylum: Arthropoda
- Clade: Pancrustacea
- Class: Insecta
- Order: Lepidoptera
- Family: Crambidae
- Genus: Agriphila
- Species: A. paleatellus

Binomial name
- Agriphila paleatellus (Zeller, 1847)

Synonyms
- Crambus paleatellus Zeller, 1847; Agriphila paleatella

Species of moth

Agriphila paleatellus is a species of moth in the family Crambidae described by Philipp Christoph Zeller in 1847. It is found in Croatia, Bosnia and Herzegovina, Greece, on Sicily and in Asia Minor and Syria.
