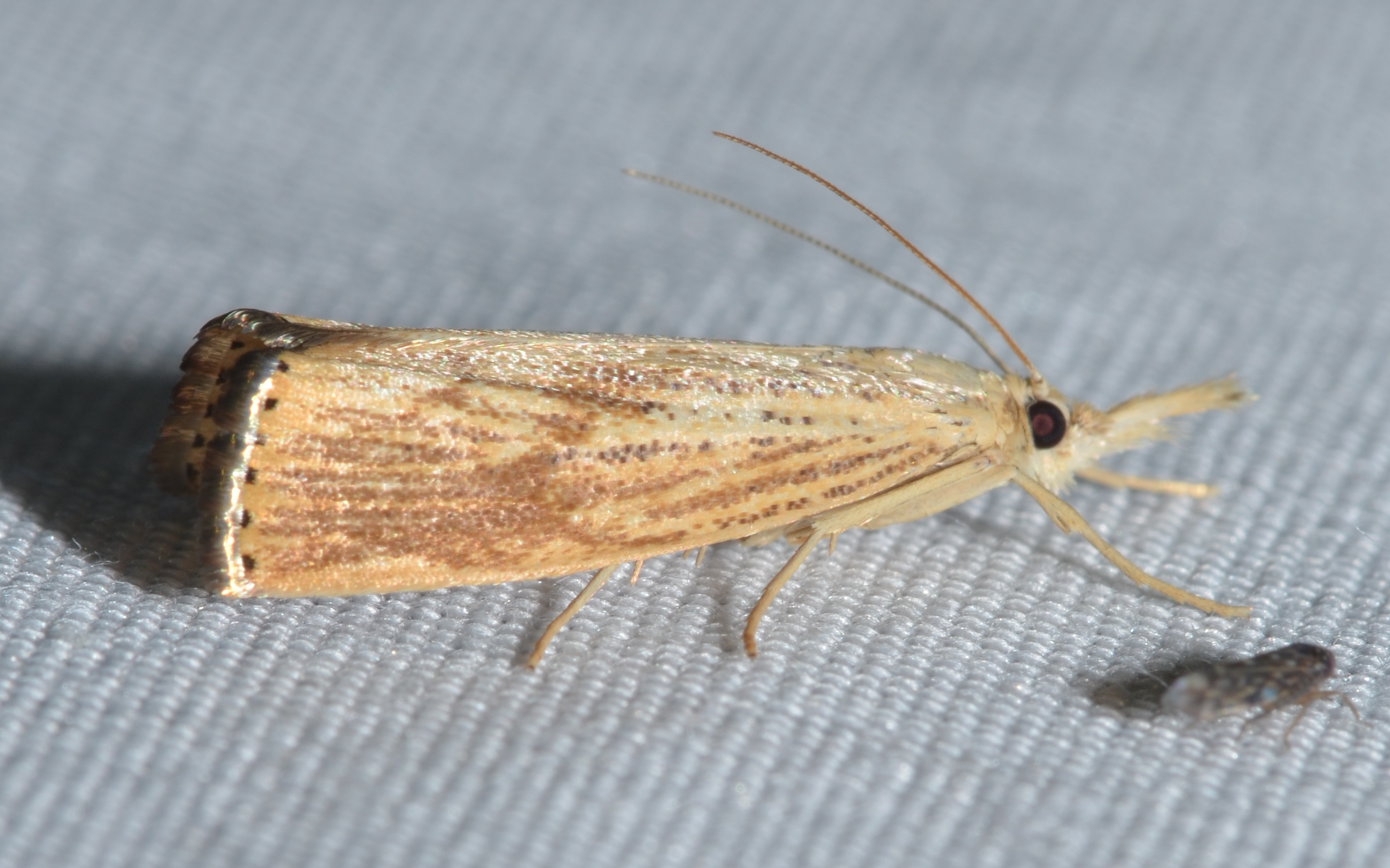

Scientific classification
- Kingdom: Animalia
- Phylum: Arthropoda
- Clade: Pancrustacea
- Class: Insecta
- Order: Lepidoptera
- Family: Crambidae
- Genus: Agriphila
- Species: A. ruricolella

Binomial name
- Agriphila ruricolella (Zeller, 1863)

Synonyms
- Crambus ruricolellus Zeller, 1863; Agriphila ruricolellus; Crambus ruricolellus canadellus Haimbach, 1930

= Agriphila ruricolella =

Species of moth

Agriphila ruricolella, the lesser vagabond sod webworm, is a moth in the family Crambidae. It was described by Philipp Christoph Zeller in 1863. It is found in North America, where it has been recorded from Quebec and Maine to South Carolina, west to Arizona and north to Alberta. The habitat consists of grasslands, weedy areas, fields and cultivated areas.

The wingspan is 18–20 mm.

The larvae feed on various grasses, as well as Rumex acetosella. The species overwinters in the larval stage.
