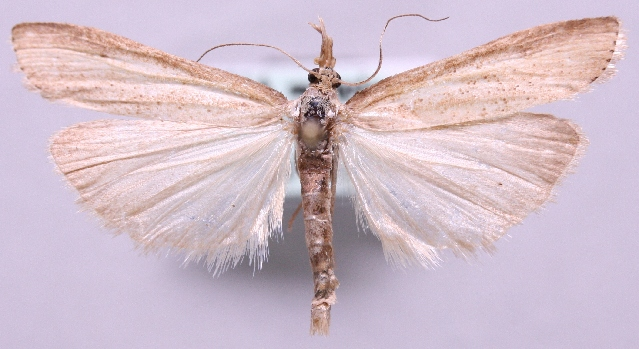

Scientific classification
- Kingdom: Animalia
- Phylum: Arthropoda
- Clade: Pancrustacea
- Class: Insecta
- Order: Lepidoptera
- Family: Crambidae
- Genus: Agriphila
- Species: A. poliellus

Binomial name
- Agriphila poliellus (Treitschke, 1832)

Synonyms
- Chilo poliellus Treitschke, 1832; Alisa amseli Ganev & Hacker, 1984; Agriphila poliella

= Agriphila poliellus =

Species of moth

Agriphila poliellus is a species of moth in the family Crambidae described by Georg Friedrich Treitschke in 1832. It is found in most of Europe (except Ireland, the Benelux, the Iberian Peninsula, Switzerland, Italy, Slovenia, Norway and Greece), Turkey, Iran, the Ural, Dagestan, Kazakhstan and Central Asia. Its type locality is in Hungary.

The wingspan is 19–26 mm.

The larvae feed on Poa species, possibly including Poa annua.
