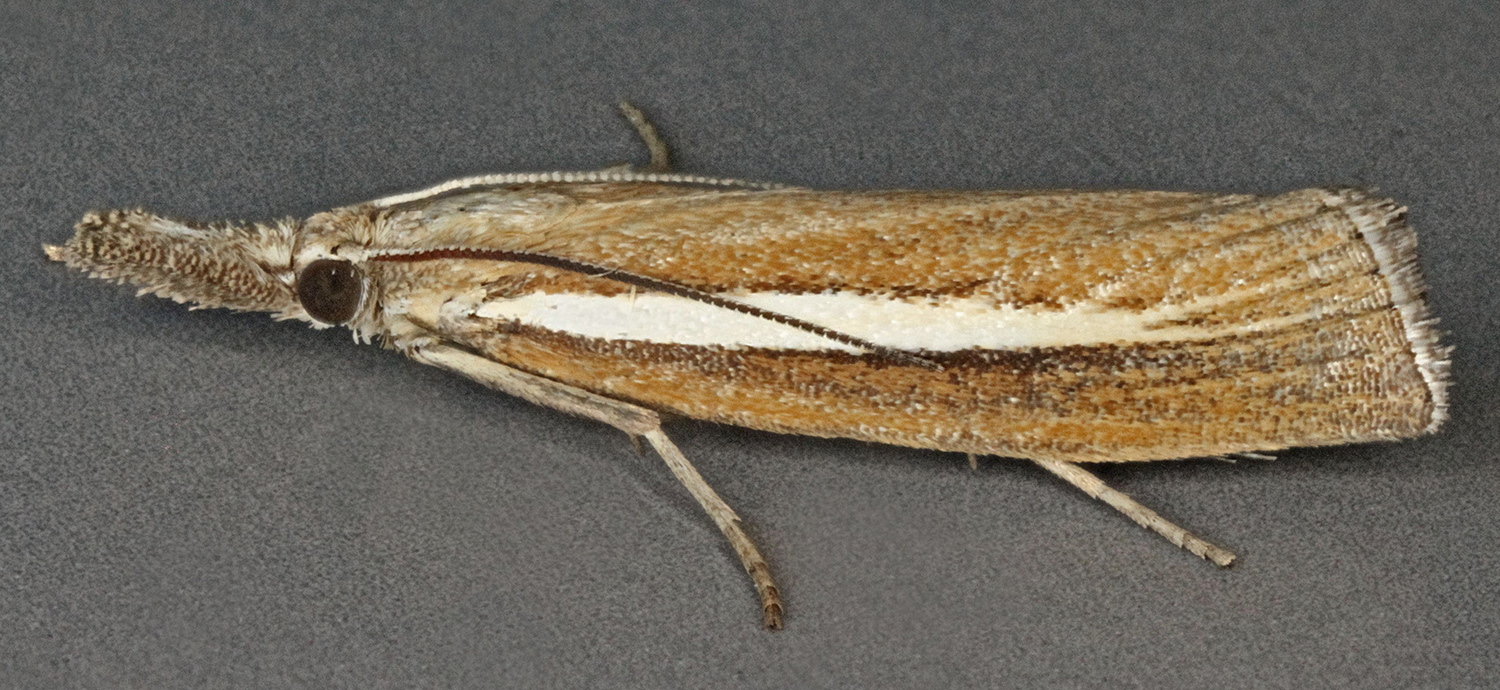

Scientific classification
- Kingdom: Animalia
- Phylum: Arthropoda
- Clade: Pancrustacea
- Class: Insecta
- Order: Lepidoptera
- Family: Crambidae
- Genus: Agriphila
- Species: A. selasella

Binomial name
- Agriphila selasella (Hübner, [1813])

Synonyms
- Tinea selasella Hübner, 1813; Crambus obtusellus Stephens, 1834; Agriphila selasella marioni Leraut, 2001

= Agriphila selasella =

Species of moth

Agriphila selasella is a species of moth of the family Crambidae. It was described by Jacob Hübner in 1813 and is found in Europe and east across the Palearctic.

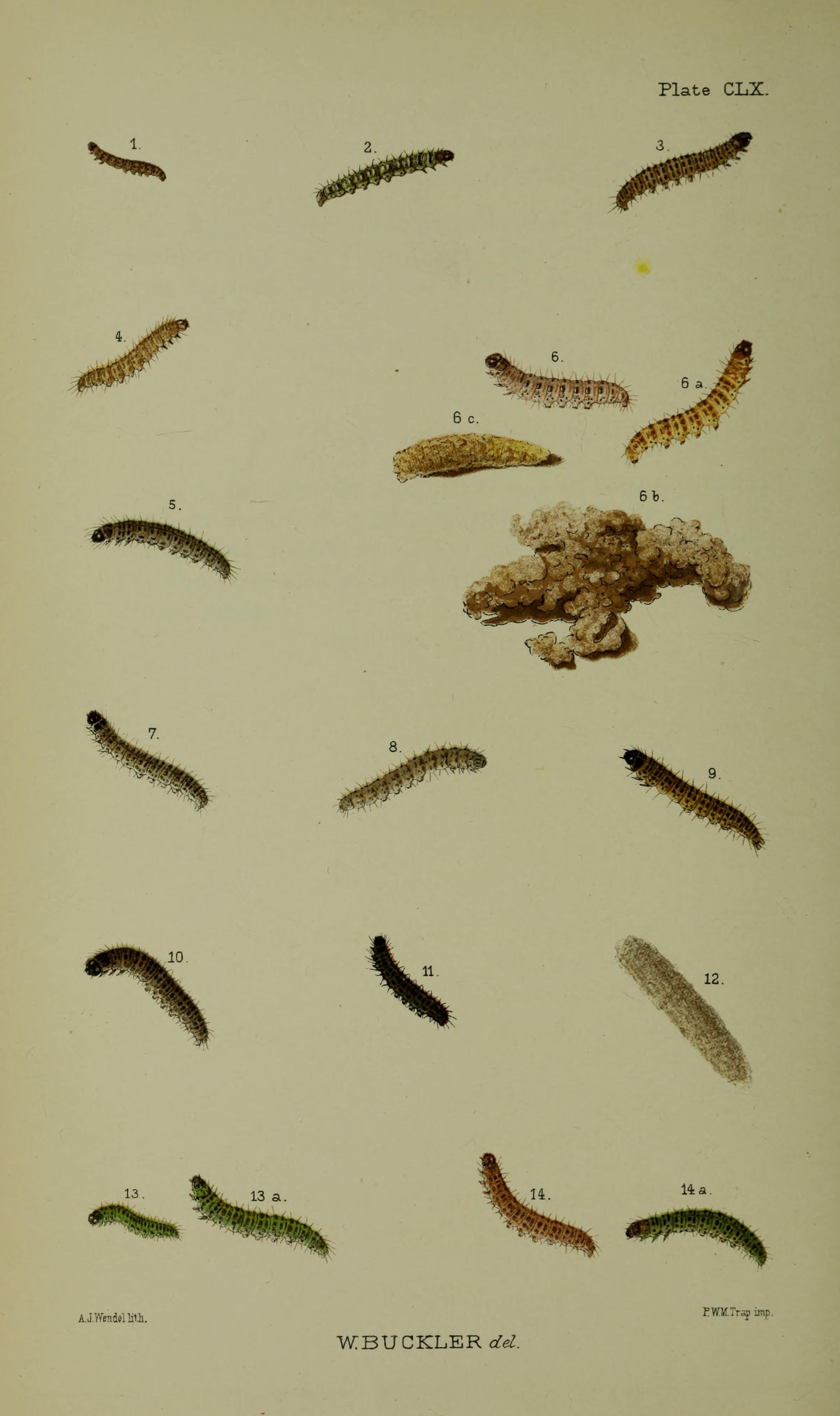
Fig.9 larva after final moult

The wingspan is about 26 mm. The face is slightly prominent. Forewings are whitish-ochreous or ochreous, mixed or sometimes much suffused with light fuscous; a moderately thick well-defined white median streak from base to 3/4 or 5/6 terminating in two or three fine whitish streaks on veins; sometimes some indistinct blackish terminal dots; cilia shining fuscous. Hindwings are grey. The larva is brown, paler laterally; spots large, dark brown; head black; plate of 2 black -brown.

The moth flies from July to August depending on the location.

The larvae feed on various grasses, such as Puccinellia maritima and Festuca ovina.
