= Agriphila indivisellus =

Scientific classification
- Kingdom: Animalia
- Phylum: Arthropoda
- Clade: Pancrustacea
- Class: Insecta
- Order: Lepidoptera
- Family: Crambidae
- Genus: Agriphila
- Species: A. indivisellus

Binomial name
- Agriphila indivisellus (Turati & Zanon, 1922)

Synonyms
- Crambus indivisellus Turati & Zanon, 1922; Agriphila indivisella; Agriphila reisseri Bleszynski, 1965

Species of moth

Agriphila indivisellus is a species of moth in the family Crambidae described by Turati and Zanon in 1922. It is found on Crete and in North Africa.
