= Agriphila attenuata =

Scientific classification
- Kingdom: Animalia
- Phylum: Arthropoda
- Clade: Pancrustacea
- Class: Insecta
- Order: Lepidoptera
- Family: Crambidae
- Genus: Agriphila
- Species: A. attenuata

Binomial name
- Agriphila attenuata (Grote, 1880)

Synonyms
- Crambus attenuatus Grote, 1880; Agriphila attenuatus

Species of moth

Agriphila attenuata is a moth in the family Crambidae. It was described by Augustus Radcliffe Grote in 1880. It is found in North America, where it has been recorded from coastal California, Washington, Wyoming, British Columbia and Alberta. The habitat consists of grasslands.

The wingspan is 24–26 mm. Adults are on wing from late August to early September.

The larvae probably feed on grasses.
