= Agriphila biothanatalis =

Scientific classification
- Kingdom: Animalia
- Phylum: Arthropoda
- Clade: Pancrustacea
- Class: Insecta
- Order: Lepidoptera
- Family: Crambidae
- Genus: Agriphila
- Species: A. biothanatalis

Binomial name
- Agriphila biothanatalis (Hulst, 1886)

Synonyms
- Crambus biothanatalis Hulst, 1886; Agriphila biotanathalis Błeszyński & Collins, 1962; Crambus behrensellus Fernald, 1887

Species of moth

Agriphila biothanatalis is a moth in the family Crambidae. It was described by George Duryea Hulst in 1886. It is found in North America, where it has been recorded from California and Oregon.

The wingspan is about 22 mm. Adults have been recorded on wing in July and from September to October.
