= Agriphila microselasella =

Scientific classification
- Kingdom: Animalia
- Phylum: Arthropoda
- Clade: Pancrustacea
- Class: Insecta
- Order: Lepidoptera
- Family: Crambidae
- Genus: Agriphila
- Species: A. microselasella

Binomial name
- Agriphila microselasella Błeszyński, 1959

Species of moth

Agriphila microselasella is a moth in the family Crambidae. It was described by Stanisław Błeszyński in 1959. It is found in Iran.
