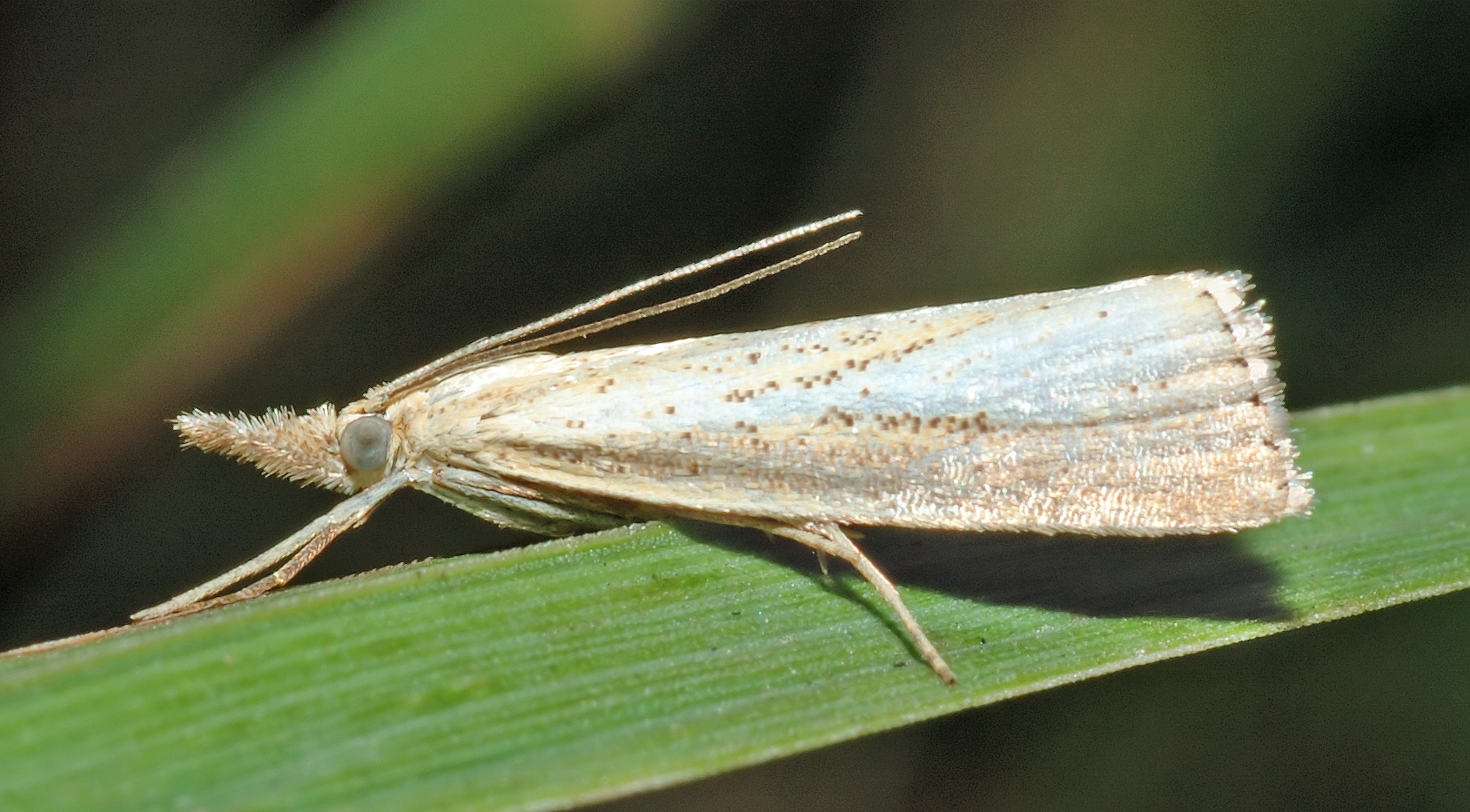
- Agriphila straminella

Scientific classification
- Kingdom: Animalia
- Phylum: Arthropoda
- Clade: Pancrustacea
- Class: Insecta
- Order: Lepidoptera
- Family: Crambidae
- Tribe: Crambini
- Genus: Agriphila; Hübner, [1825]

Species
- Numerous, see text

Synonyms
- Agrophila J. L. R. Agassiz, 1847; Alisa Ganev & Hacker, 1984

= Agriphila =

Genus of moths

Agriphila is a genus of small moths of the family Crambidae. It was first described by Jacob Hübner in 1825. They are common across temperate Eurasia and in adjacent regions.

Despite this genus being proposed as early as 1825, it was not widely recognized until the mid-20th century. Consequently, most species were initially placed in the closely related genus Crambus.

== Species ==
- Agriphila aeneociliella (Eversmann, 1844)
- Agriphila anceps (Grote, 1880)
- Agriphila argentea Bassi, 1999
- Agriphila argentistrigella (Ragonot in de Joannis & Ragonot, 1889)
- Agriphila atlantica (T. V. Wollaston, 1858)
- Agriphila attenuata (Grote, 1880)
- Agriphila beieri Błeszyński, 1955
- Agriphila biarmicus (Tengström, 1865)
- Agriphila biothanatalis (Hulst, 1886)
- Agriphila bleszynskiella Amsel, 1961
- Agriphila brioniella (Zerny, 1914) (=Agriphila vasilevi Ganev, 1983)
- Agriphila cernyi Ganev, 1985
- Agriphila costalipartella (Dyar, 1921)
- Agriphila cyrenaicella (Ragonot, 1887)
- Agriphila dalmatinella (Hampson, 1900)
- Agriphila deliella (Hübner, 1813)
- Agriphila geniculea (Haworth, 1811)
- Agriphila gerinella P. Leraut, 2012
- Agriphila hymalayensis Ganev, 1984
- Agriphila impurella (Hampson, 1896)
- Agriphila indivisella (Turati & Zanon, 1922) (=Agriphila reisseri Błeszyński, 1965)
- Agriphila inquinatella (Denis & Schiffermüller, 1775)
- Agriphila latistria (Haworth, 1811)
- Agriphila melike Kemal & Kocak, 2004 (replacement name for A. asiatica Ganev & Hacker, 1984)
- Agriphila microselasella Błeszyński, 1959
- Agriphila paleatella (Zeller, 1847)
- Agriphila plumbifimbriella (Dyar, 1904)
- Agriphila poliella (Treitschke, 1832)
- Agriphila ruricolella (Zeller, 1863) – lesser vagabond sod webworm moth
- Agriphila sakayehamana (Matsumura, 1925)
- Agriphila selasella (Hübner, 1813)
- Agriphila straminella (Denis & Schiffermüller, 1775)
- Agriphila tersella (Lederer, 1855)
- Agriphila tolli (Błeszyński, 1952)
- Agriphila trabeatella (Herrich-Schäffer, 1848)
- Agriphila tristella (Denis & Schiffermüller, 1775)
- Agriphila undata (Grote, 1881)
- Agriphila vulgivagella (Clemens, 1860) – vagabond crambus moth
