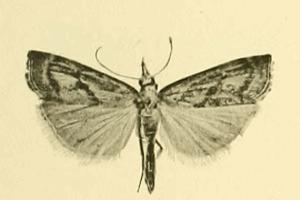

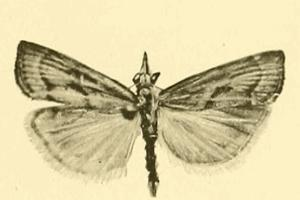

Scientific classification
- Kingdom: Animalia
- Phylum: Arthropoda
- Clade: Pancrustacea
- Class: Insecta
- Order: Lepidoptera
- Family: Crambidae
- Genus: Agriphila
- Species: A. brioniellus

Binomial name
- Agriphila brioniellus (Zerny, 1914)

Synonyms
- Crambus brioniellus Zerny, 1914; Agriphila brioniella; Agriphila vasilevi Ganev, 1983; Agriphila brioniellus subbrioniella Bleszynski in Amsel, 1959

= Agriphila brioniellus =

Species of moth

Agriphila brioniellus is a species of moth in the family Crambidae described by Hans Zerny in 1914. It is found in Spain, France, Italy, Croatia, Hungary, Slovakia, Ukraine, Romania, Bulgaria, the Republic of Macedonia, Albania, Turkey, Transcaucasia and Iraq.

The length of the forewings is 9–11 mm.

== Subspecies ==
- Agriphila brioniellus brioniellus (Europe, Asia Minor, Transcaucasia)
- Agriphila brioniellus subrioniella Bleszynski, 1959 (Iraq)
