= Agriphila dalmatinellus =

Scientific classification
- Kingdom: Animalia
- Phylum: Arthropoda
- Clade: Pancrustacea
- Class: Insecta
- Order: Lepidoptera
- Family: Crambidae
- Genus: Agriphila
- Species: A. dalmatinellus

Binomial name
- Agriphila dalmatinellus (Hampson, 1900)

Synonyms
- Crambus dalmatinellus Hampson, 1900; Agriphila dalmatinella

Species of moth

Agriphila dalmatinellus is a species of moth in the family Crambidae that is known from Europe and Asia. Within Europe, it is found in Croatia, Bosnia and Herzegovina, Italy, Bulgaria, the Republic of Macedonia and Greece. In Asia, it is known from Cyprus, Iran, Iraq, Syria and Samarkand.

The wingspan is about 24 mm. The forewings are ochreous yellow irrorated with large brown scales. The hindwings are pale brownish fuscous.
