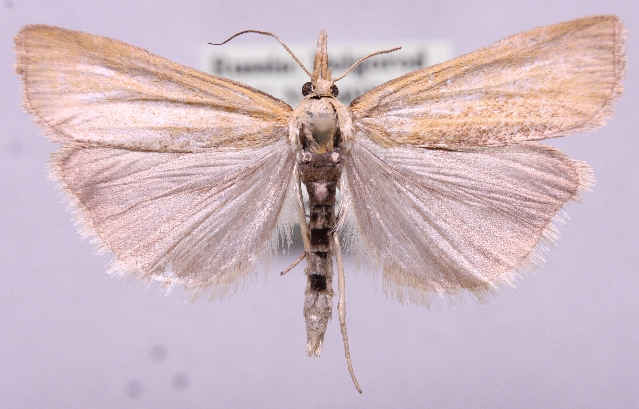

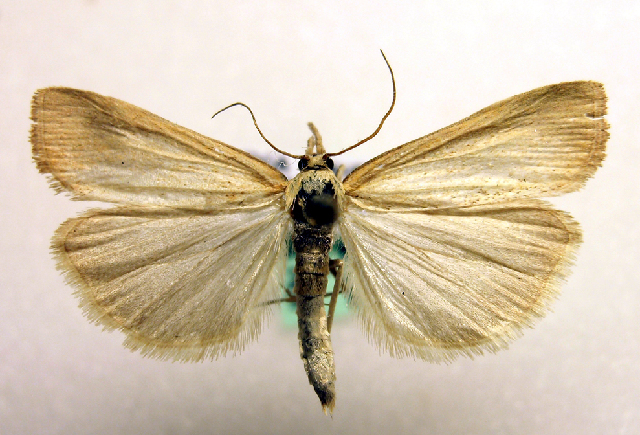

Scientific classification
- Kingdom: Animalia
- Phylum: Arthropoda
- Clade: Pancrustacea
- Class: Insecta
- Order: Lepidoptera
- Family: Crambidae
- Genus: Pediasia
- Species: P. luteella

Binomial name
- Pediasia luteella (Denis & Schiffermuller, 1775)

Synonyms
- Tinea luteella Denis & Schiffermuller, 1775; Crambus kindermanni Zeller, 1863; Crambus luteellus f. griseellus Obraztsov, 1936; Crambus uhryki Rothschild, 1911; Crambus lutealis Hübner, 1825; Tinea exoletella Denis & Schiffermüller, 1775; Agriphila exoletalis Hübner, 1825; Tinea exsoletella Hübner, 1796; Tinea convolutella Denis & Schiffermüller, 1775; Tinea ochrella Hübner, 1796

= Pediasia luteella =

Species of moth

Pediasia luteella is a species of moth in the family Crambidae. It was described by Michael Denis and Ignaz Schiffermüller in 1775. It is found in most of Europe (except Ireland, Great Britain, the Netherlands, Norway, Sweden and the Iberian Peninsula). In the east, the range extends to Central Asia, the northern Caucasus, Transcaucasia, southern Siberia and Mongolia.

Adults are on wing from the end of May to mid-July in one generation per year.

The larvae feed on Festuca ovina and Poa species.
