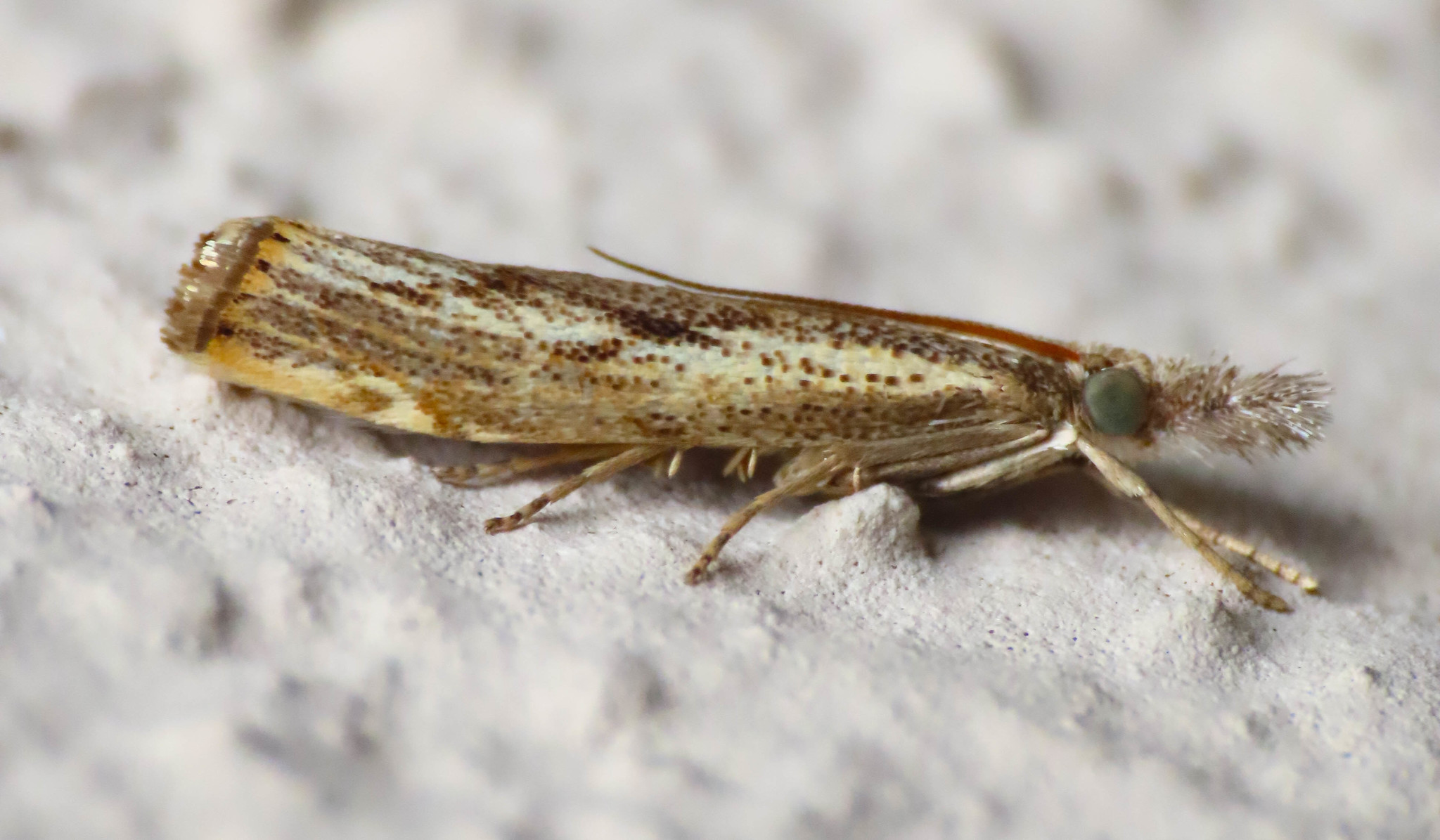

Scientific classification
- Kingdom: Animalia
- Phylum: Arthropoda
- Clade: Pancrustacea
- Class: Insecta
- Order: Lepidoptera
- Family: Crambidae
- Genus: Agriphila
- Species: A. tolli

Binomial name
- Agriphila tolli (Bleszynski, 1952)

Synonyms
- Crambus tolli Bleszynski, 1952

= Agriphila tolli =

Species of moth

Agriphila tolli is a species of moth in the family Crambidae. It is found in Ukraine, Romania, Bulgaria, Turkey, Greece, the Republic of North Macedonia, Albania, Montenegro, Hungary, Slovakia, the Czech Republic, Austria, Italy and on Corsica, Sicily and Crete.

== Subspecies ==
- Agriphila poliellus poliellus
- Agriphila poliellus pelsonius Fazekas, 1985 (Carpathian basin)
