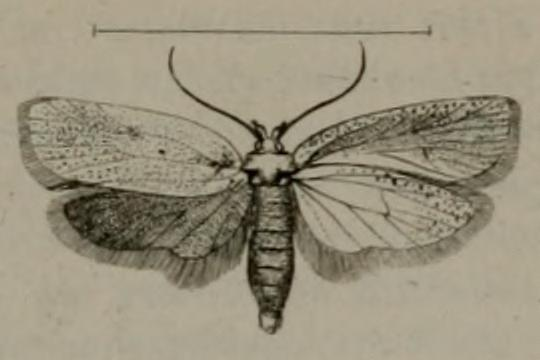

Scientific classification
- Kingdom: Animalia
- Phylum: Arthropoda
- Clade: Pancrustacea
- Class: Insecta
- Order: Lepidoptera
- Family: Depressariidae
- Genus: Agonopterix
- Species: A. comitella

Binomial name
- Agonopterix comitella (Lederer, 1855)

Synonyms
- Depressaria comitella Lederer, 1855

= Agonopterix comitella =

Species of moth

Agonopterix comitella is a moth of the family Depressariidae. It is found in Bulgaria, Greece and Turkey and on Crete. It has also been recorded from Israel, Syria and Turkey.
