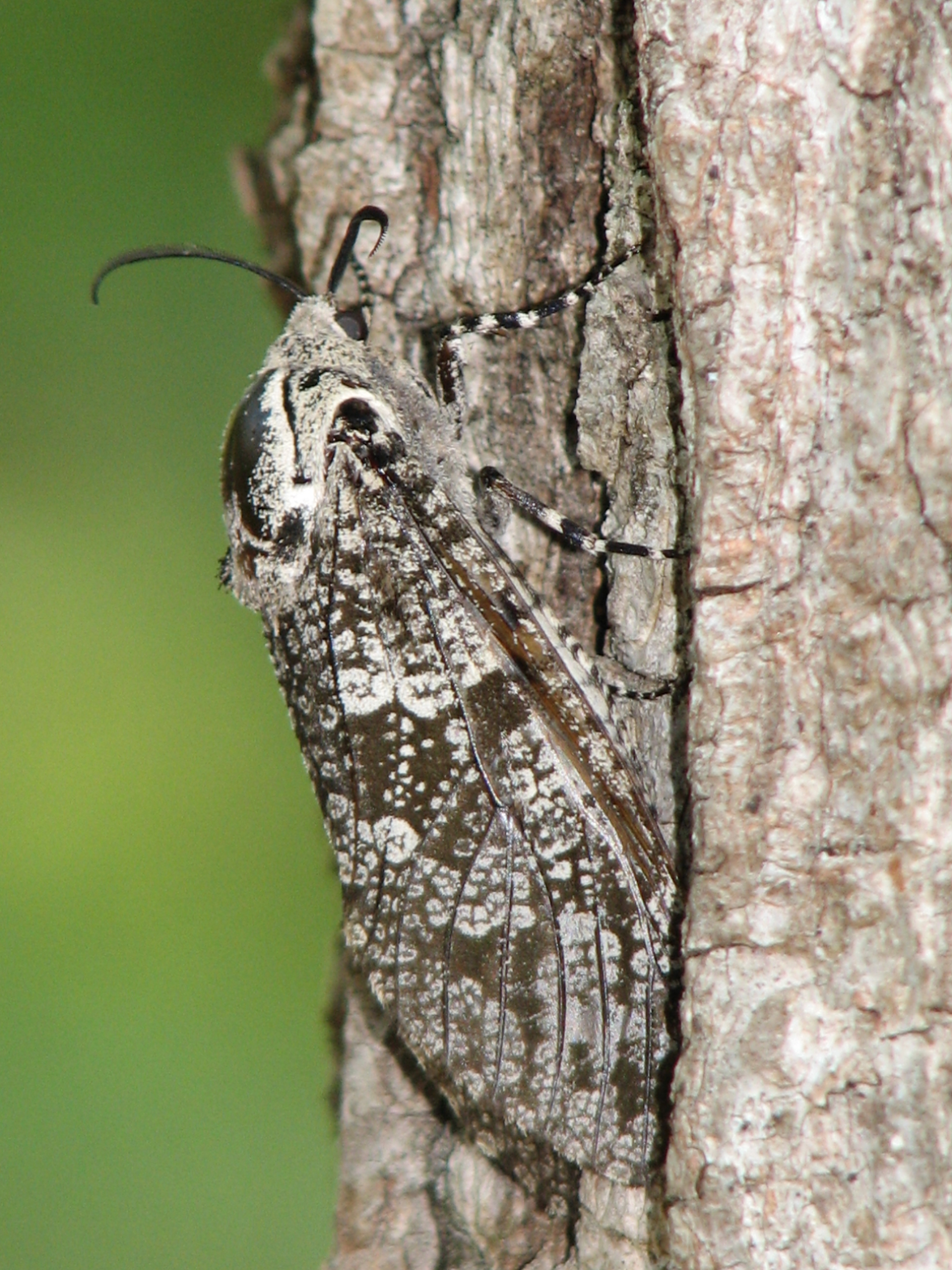
- Carpenterworm moth (Prionoxystus robiniae)

Scientific classification
- Domain: Eukaryota
- Kingdom: Animalia
- Phylum: Arthropoda
- Class: Insecta
- Order: Lepidoptera
- Family: Cossidae
- Subfamily: Cossinae; Leach, 1830

Genera
- Numerous, see text

= Cossinae =

Subfamily of moths

The Cossinae are the nominate subfamily of the Cossidae (carpenter or goat moths). The caterpillars of several Cossinae species, such as the carpenterworm (Prionoxystus robiniae) and the goat moth (Cossus cossus), are significant pests. On the other hand, in Chile the caterpillars of the Chilean moth (Chilecomadia moorei) are collected on a commercial scale for sale as fishing bait and terrarium pet food; they are usually called "butterworms" in international trade.

The Cossulinae have been separated from the Cossinae in recent decades, but this was not universally accepted at first. Some misplaced genera have been moved between the subfamilies, and as it seems the Cossulinae at least now represent a monophyletic group.

== Systematics ==
Some significant species are also listed:

- Unplaced to tribe/placement unknown
  - Citharalia Clench, 1957 (formerly in Cossulinae)
  - Comadia Barnes & McDunnough, 1911
  - Cossodes White, 1841
  - Culama Walker, 1856
  - Dieidapersa Strand in Stichel, 1911
  - Dieida Strand, 1911
  - Fania Barnes & McDunnough, 1911 (tentatively placed here)
  - Idioses Turner, 1927
  - Macrocyttara Turner, 1918
  - Miacora Dyar, 1905 (tentatively placed here)
  - Prionoxystus Grote, 1882
  - Psychidocossus D. S. Fletcher, 1982
  - Surcossus Heimlich, 1960
  - Trigena Dyar, 1905 (formerly in Cossulinae)
  - Zyganisus Viette, 1951
- Zeuzerocossini Yakovlev, 2008
  - Acossus Dyar, 1905
  - Alcterogystia Schoorl, 1990
  - Arctiocossus Felder, 1874
  - Assegaj Yakovlev, 2006
  - Brachygystia Schoorl, 1990
  - Chingizid Yakovlev, 2011
  - Chinocossus Yakovlev, 2006
  - Dervishiya Yakovlev, 2006
  - Eogystia Schoorl, 1990
  - Eremocossus Hampson, 1893
  - Gobibatyr Yakovlev, 2004
  - Kalimantanossus Yakovlev, 2011
  - Mahommedella Yakovlev, 2011
  - Neurocossus Yakovlev, 2010
  - Paropta Staudinger, 1900
  - Patoptoformis Yakovlev, 2006
  - Planctogystia Schoorl, 1990
  - Rethona Walker, 1855
  - Ronaldocossus Yakovlev, 2006
  - Wiltshirocossus Yakovlev, 2007
  - Zeuzerocossus Yakovlev, 2008
- Endagriini Duponchel, [1845]
  - Afroarabiella Yakovlev, 2008
  - Dyspessa Hübner, 1820
  - Groenendaelia Yakovlev, 2004
  - Hollowiella Yakovlev & Witt, 2009
  - Isoceras Turati, 1924
  - Paracossulus Schoorl, 1990
  - Stygoides Bruand, 1853
  - Samagystia Schoorl, 1990
- Holcocerini Yakovlev, 2006
  - Afrikanetz Yakovlev, 2009
  - Aholcocerus Yakovlev, 2006
  - Barchaniella Yakovlev, 2006
  - Brachylia Felder, 1874
  - Camellocossus Yakovlev, 2011
  - Coryphodema Felder, 1874
  - Cossulus Staudinger, 1887
  - Cossus Fabricius, 1794
  - Cryptoholcocerus Yakovlev, 2006
  - Deserticossus Yakovlev, 2006
  - Dyspessacossus Daniel, 1953
  - Franzdanielia Yakovlev, 2006
  - Gumilevia Yakovlev, 2011
  - Hirtocossus Schoorl, 1990
  - Holcocerus Staudinger, 1884
  - Isocossus Roepke, 1957
  - Kerzhnerocossus Yakovlev, 2011
  - Koboldocossus Yakovlev, 2011
  - Kotchevnik Yakovlev, 2004
  - Mirocossus Schoorl, 1990
  - Macrocossus Aurivillius, 1900
  - Mormogystia Schoorl, 1990
  - Paracossus Hampson, 1904
  - Parahypopta Daniel, 1961
  - Plyustchiella Yakovlev, 2006
  - Pygmeocossus Yakovlev, 2005
  - Rambuasalama Yakovlev & Saldaitis, 2008
  - Reticulocossus Yakovlev, 2011
  - Roepkiella Yakovlev & Witt, 2009
  - Semitocossus Yakovlev, 2007
  - Streltzoviella Yakovlev, 2006
  - Sundacossus Yakovlev, 2006
  - Vartiania Yakovlev, 2004
  - Wittocossus Yakovlev, 2004
  - Yakudza Yakovlev, 2006

== Former genera ==
- Bifiduncus
- Butaya Yakovlev, 2004
- Catopta Staudinger, 1899
- Chiangmaiana Kemal & Koçak, 2005 (≡Nirvana Yakovlev, 2004 nom. invalid.(preoc.name) non Stål, 1859 nec Kirkaldy, 1900 nec Yakovlev, 2007 nec Tsukuda & Nishiyama, 1979);(≡Nirrvanna Yakovlev, 2007 nom. invalid.( junior object. syn.), objective replacement name (mistaken repl.n.))
- Chilecomadia
- Danielostygia Reisser, 1962 (tentatively placed here)
- Lamellocossus Daniel, 1956 (tentatively placed here)
- Toronia Barnes & McDunnough, 1911
- Yakovlevina Kemal & Koçak, 2005 (=Garuda Yakovlev, 2005)
- Stygia Latreille, 1803 (tentatively placed here)
