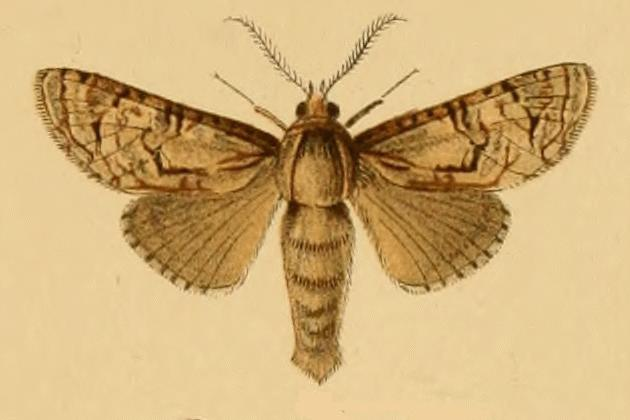
- Paropta l-nigrum

Scientific classification
- Domain: Eukaryota
- Kingdom: Animalia
- Phylum: Arthropoda
- Class: Insecta
- Order: Lepidoptera
- Family: Cossidae
- Subfamily: Cossinae
- Genus: Paropta; Staudinger, 1899

Synonyms
- Patopta Yakovlev, 2004

= Paropta =

Genus of moths

Paropta is a genus of moths in the family Cossidae.

== Species ==
- Paropta paradoxus Herrich-Schäffer, 1851

== Former species ==
- Paropta confusa Rothschild, 1912
- Paropta frater (Warnecke, 1929)
- Paropta henleyi Warren & Rothschild, 1905
- Paropta johannes Staudinger, 1899
- Paropta l-nigrum Bethune-Baker, 1894
