= Alcterogystia =

Scientific classification
- Kingdom: Animalia
- Phylum: Arthropoda
- Clade: Pancrustacea
- Class: Insecta
- Order: Lepidoptera
- Family: Cossidae
- Subfamily: Cossinae
- Genus: Alcterogystia; Schoorl, 1990

Genus of moths

Alcterogystia is a genus of moths in the family Cossidae.

== Species ==
- Alcterogystia frater (Warnecke, 1929)
- Alcterogystia l-nigra

== Former species ==
- Alcterogystia cadambae
- Alcterogystia nilotica

== Etymology ==
The genus name is derived from Greek alcter (meaning protector) plus gystia (an anagram of the genus-name Stygia).
