= Chinggisid (disambiguation) =

Chinggisid, or Chingisid, Chingizid, Genghisid etc. usually refers to people or things associated with Genghis Khan. In this sense it may refer to:

- Chinggisid prince, one who could trace direct descent from Genghis Khan through the Chinggisid principle, or golden lineage
- Chinggisid states, the successor states or Khanates after the Mongol empire broke up
- Chinggisid peoples, members of Genghis Khan's armies who came in contact with Europeans, primarily Turkic peoples of the Golden Horde

It may also refer to:

- Chingizid (moth), a genus of moths belonging to the family Cossidae.
