= Chingizid kosachevi =

Scientific classification
- Kingdom: Animalia
- Phylum: Arthropoda
- Clade: Pancrustacea
- Class: Insecta
- Order: Lepidoptera
- Family: Cossidae
- Subfamily: Cossinae
- Tribe: Cossini
- Genus: Chingizid
- Species: C. kosachevi

Binomial name
- Chingizid kosachevi Yakovlev, 2012

Species of moth

Chingizid kosachevi is a moth in the family Cossidae. It was described by Yakovlev in 2012 and is endemic to Mongolia.
