= Isoceras =

Scientific classification
- Domain: Eukaryota
- Kingdom: Animalia
- Phylum: Arthropoda
- Class: Insecta
- Order: Lepidoptera
- Family: Cossidae
- Subfamily: Cossinae
- Genus: Isoceras; Turati, 1924

Genus of moths

Isoceras is a genus of moths in the family Cossidae.

== Species ==
- Isoceras bipunctatum (Staudinger, 1887)
- Isoceras huberi Eitschberger & Ströhle, 1987
- Isoceras kruegeri Turati, 1924
- Isoceras saxicola (Christoph, 1885)
- Isoceras teheranica Daniel, 1971

== Former species ==
- Isoceras kaszabi Daniel, 1965
