= Assegai (disambiguation) =

An assegai is a type of spear.

Assegai may also refer to:

- Assegai (automobile), a South African-built Formula One car
- Assegai (novel), a 2009 novel by Wilbur Smith
- Assegai tree (Curtisia dentata), a tree indigenous to South Africa
- The Assegai, a 1982 Zimbabwean film
- An alternative spelling of the South African town Assagay

== See also ==
- Assagai, a British Afro-rock band
- Assagai (horse) (1963–1986), an American Thoroughbred racehorse
- Assegaj, a monotypic genus of moths in the family Cossidae
- Azagaia (1984–2023), a Mozambican rapper
