= Chingizid transaltaica =

Scientific classification
- Domain: Eukaryota
- Kingdom: Animalia
- Phylum: Arthropoda
- Class: Insecta
- Order: Lepidoptera
- Family: Cossidae
- Subfamily: Cossinae
- Tribe: Cossini
- Genus: Chingizid
- Species: C. transaltaica

Binomial name
- Chingizid transaltaica (Daniel, 1970)

Synonyms
- Lamellocossus transaltaica Daniel, 1970

Species of moth

Chingizid transaltaica is a moth in the family Cossidae. It was described by Franz Daniel in 1970. It is found in Mongolia.
