= Catopta albonubilus =

Scientific classification
- Domain: Eukaryota
- Kingdom: Animalia
- Phylum: Arthropoda
- Class: Insecta
- Order: Lepidoptera
- Family: Cossidae
- Genus: Catopta
- Species: C. albonubilus

Binomial name
- Catopta albonubilus (Graeser, 1888)

Synonyms
- Cossus albonubilus Graeser, 1888; Catopta albonubilosa

Species of moth

Catopta albonubilus is a moth in the family Cossidae. It was described by Ludwig Carl Friedrich Graeser in 1888. It is found from Kyrgyzstan through Central Asia to Myanmar, Korea, the Russian Far East, Mongolia, Korea and north-eastern China.

== Subspecies ==
- Catopta albonubilus albonubilus (Russia: Chita, Primorje, Yakutia; Mongolia: Central, Hentyi aimaks; north-eastern China; Korea)
- Catopta albonubilus argunica Yakovlev, 2007 (Russia: East Trasbaicalia; central and eastern Mongolia)
- Catopta albonubilus centralsinica Daniel, 1940 (China: Heilongjiang, Beijing, Shaanxi, Shanxi)
