= Catoptinae =

Scientific classification
- Kingdom: Animalia
- Phylum: Arthropoda
- Clade: Pancrustacea
- Class: Insecta
- Order: Lepidoptera
- Family: Cossidae
- Subfamily: Catoptinae; Yakovlev, 2009

Subfamily of moths

The Catoptinae are a subfamily of the family Cossidae (carpenter or goat moths).

== Genera ==
- Catopta Staudinger, 1899
- Chiangmaiana Kemal & Koçak, 2005 objective replacement name Cesa, Miscellaneous papers, 91/92: 12. [misdating as: "Kemal & Koçak, 2007" (Yakovlev & Saldaitis, 2007) Eversmannia, 11–12: 12; misdating as: "Kemal & Koçak, 2006" (Yakovlev, 2009) Zoologicheskii Zhurnal, 88 (10): 1207, 1211.] ( ≡ Nirvana Yakovlev, 2004 nom. invalid.(preoc.name) non Stål, 1859 nec Kirkaldy, 1900 nec Yakovlev, 2007 nec Tsukuda & Nishiyama, 1979);( ≡ Nirrvanna Yakovlev, 2007 nom. invalid.( junior object. syn.), objective replacement name (mistaken repl.n.) non Stål, 1859 nec Kirkaldy, 1900 nec Tsukuda & Nishiyama, 1979 )
