= Rethona strigosa =

Scientific classification
- Kingdom: Animalia
- Phylum: Arthropoda
- Class: Insecta
- Order: Lepidoptera
- Family: Cossidae
- Genus: Rethona
- Species: R. strigosa

Binomial name
- Rethona strigosa Walker, 1855

Species of moth

Rethona strigosa is a moth in the family Cossidae. It is found in Namibia and South Africa.
