= Isoceras huberi =

Scientific classification
- Kingdom: Animalia
- Phylum: Arthropoda
- Class: Insecta
- Order: Lepidoptera
- Family: Cossidae
- Genus: Isoceras
- Species: I. huberi

Binomial name
- Isoceras huberi Eitschberger & Ströhle, 1987

Species of moth

Isoceras huberi is a moth in the family Cossidae. It was described by Ulf Eitschberger and Manfred Ströhle in 1987. It is found in Turkey, Armenia and Transcaucasia (Georgia and Azerbaijan).
