= Trigena serenensis =

Scientific classification
- Kingdom: Animalia
- Phylum: Arthropoda
- Class: Insecta
- Order: Lepidoptera
- Family: Cossidae
- Genus: Trigena
- Species: T. serenensis

Binomial name
- Trigena serenensis Ureta, 1957

Species of moth

Trigena serenensis is a moth in the family Cossidae. It was described by Ureta in 1957. It is found in Chile.
