= Miacora leucocraspedontis =

Scientific classification
- Domain: Eukaryota
- Kingdom: Animalia
- Phylum: Arthropoda
- Class: Insecta
- Order: Lepidoptera
- Family: Cossidae
- Genus: Miacora
- Species: M. leucocraspedontis

Binomial name
- Miacora leucocraspedontis Zukowsky, 1954

Species of moth

Miacora leucocraspedontis is a moth in the family Cossidae. It was described by Zukowsky in 1954. It is found in Peru. The wingspan is about 25 mm. The forewings are bronzy-steel blue with a weak cream-coloured streak from the base of the costa to beyond the middle, broadening posteriorly, both before and beyond the fold. There is a creamy-white to fuscous postmedian streak, prolonged above the dorsum towards the tornus. The strongly dentate transverse line is edged with blue and there is a creamy-white spot in the middle of the discocellular, as well as a small one basal, reaching two-thirds across the wing. The hindwings are light tan, with a brown-grey submedian band reaching the termen and 415 with a bluey-white apical point.
