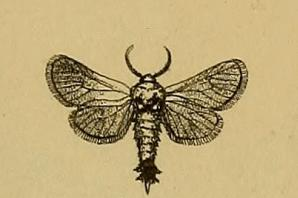

Scientific classification
- Domain: Eukaryota
- Kingdom: Animalia
- Phylum: Arthropoda
- Class: Insecta
- Order: Lepidoptera
- Family: Cossidae
- Genus: Stygioides
- Species: S. colchica

Binomial name
- Stygioides colchica (Herrich-Schäffer, 1851)

Synonyms
- Stygia colchica Herrich-Schäffer, 1851; Stygioides colchicus; Stygia dercetis Grum-Grshimailo, 1899; Stygia amasina Herrich-Schäffer 1852; Stygia tricolor Lederer, 1858; Stygoides tricolor; Typhonia stygiella Bruand, 1S53

= Stygioides colchica =

Species of moth

Stygioides colchica is a species of moth of the family Cossidae. It is found in Bulgaria, Greece, the southern part of European Russia, Ukraine, Turkey, Armenia, Lebanon and Israel.

Adults have been recorded on wing in May in Israel.

== Subspecies ==
- Stygioides colchicus colchicus
- Stygioides colchicus dercetis (Grum-Grshimailo, 1899) (Israel, Jordan, Lebanon, Syria)
