= Rambuasalama =

Scientific classification
- Kingdom: Animalia
- Phylum: Arthropoda
- Clade: Pancrustacea
- Class: Insecta
- Order: Lepidoptera
- Family: Cossidae
- Subfamily: Cossinae
- Genus: Rambuasalama; Yakovlev & Saldaitis, 2008
- Species: R. augustasi

Binomial name
- Rambuasalama augustasi Yakovlev & Saldaitis, 2008

Species of moth

Rambuasalama augustasi is a moth in the family Cossidae, and the only species in the genus Rambuasalama. It is found in Madagascar.
