= Isoceras bipunctatum =

Scientific classification
- Kingdom: Animalia
- Phylum: Arthropoda
- Class: Insecta
- Order: Lepidoptera
- Family: Cossidae
- Genus: Isoceras
- Species: I. bipunctatum

Binomial name
- Isoceras bipunctatum (Staudinger, 1887)

Synonyms
- Endagria bipunctatum Staudinger, 1887; Endagria colon Christoph, 1889; Isoceras bipunctatum marginepunctatum (Wiltshire, 1939); Dyspessa bipunctata brandti Wiltshire, 1946

Species of moth

Isoceras bipunctatum is a moth in the family Cossidae. It was described by Staudinger in 1887. It is found in Georgia, Azerbaijan, Turkey, Iran, Lebanon, Jordan, Syria, Israel and Iraq.
