= Idioses =

Scientific classification
- Kingdom: Animalia
- Phylum: Arthropoda
- Class: Insecta
- Order: Lepidoptera
- Family: Cossidae
- Subfamily: Cossinae
- Genus: Idioses; Turner, 1927
- Species: I. littleri

Binomial name
- Idioses littleri Turner, 1926

Genus of moths

Idioses is a monotypic moth genus in the family Cossidae. Its only species, Idioses littleri, was first described by Turner in 1926 and is found in eastern mainland Australia and Tasmania.
