= Dieida judith =

Scientific classification
- Kingdom: Animalia
- Phylum: Arthropoda
- Clade: Pancrustacea
- Class: Insecta
- Order: Lepidoptera
- Family: Cossidae
- Genus: Dieida
- Species: D. judith

Binomial name
- Dieida judith Yakovlev, 2008

Species of moth

Dieida judith is a species of moth of the family Cossidae. It is found in Jordan and Israel, where it is known from the northern Negev.

Adults have been recorded on wing in March in Israel.
