= Yakudza =

Scientific classification
- Kingdom: Animalia
- Phylum: Arthropoda
- Clade: Pancrustacea
- Class: Insecta
- Order: Lepidoptera
- Family: Cossidae
- Subfamily: Cossinae
- Genus: Yakudza; Yakovlev, 2006
- Species: Y. vicarius

Binomial name
- Yakudza vicarius (Walker, 1865)

Synonyms
- Cossus vicarius Walker, 1865; Holcocerus japonica Gaede, 1929; Holcocerus vicarius jezoensis Matsumura, 1931; Cossus jezoensis (Matsumura, 1931)

Species of moth

Yakudza vicarius is a moth in the family Cossidae and the only species in the genus Yakudza. It was described by Francis Walker in 1865, and reclassified in 2006. It is found in China, Russia and Japan.
