= Acossus undosus =

Scientific classification
- Domain: Eukaryota
- Kingdom: Animalia
- Phylum: Arthropoda
- Class: Insecta
- Order: Lepidoptera
- Family: Cossidae
- Genus: Acossus
- Species: A. undosus

Binomial name
- Acossus undosus (Lintner, 1878)

Synonyms
- Cossus undosus Lintner, 1878; Cossus brucei French, 1890; Acossus nodosus Kirby, 1892

Species of moth

Acossus undosus is a species of moth of the family Cossidae. It is found in the United States, including Wyoming, Utah and possibly surrounding states.

The wingspan is about 58 mm.
