= Catopta albothoracis =

Scientific classification
- Kingdom: Animalia
- Phylum: Arthropoda
- Clade: Pancrustacea
- Class: Insecta
- Order: Lepidoptera
- Family: Cossidae
- Genus: Catopta
- Species: C. albothoracis

Binomial name
- Catopta albothoracis B.Z. Hua, I. Chou, D. Fang & S. Chen, 1990

Species of moth

Catopta albothoracis is a moth in the family Cossidae. It was described by Bao-Zheng Hua, Io Chou, De-Qi Fang and Shu-Liang Chen in 1990. It is found in Sichuan, China.
