= Catopta hyrcanus =

Scientific classification
- Kingdom: Animalia
- Phylum: Arthropoda
- Clade: Pancrustacea
- Class: Insecta
- Order: Lepidoptera
- Family: Cossidae
- Genus: Catopta
- Species: C. hyrcanus

Binomial name
- Catopta hyrcanus (Christoph, 1888)

Synonyms
- Cossus hyrcanus Christoph, 1888; Catopta brandti Bryk, 1947

Species of moth

Catopta hyrcanus is a moth in the family Cossidae. It is found in Iran, Turkmenistan and Iraq.
