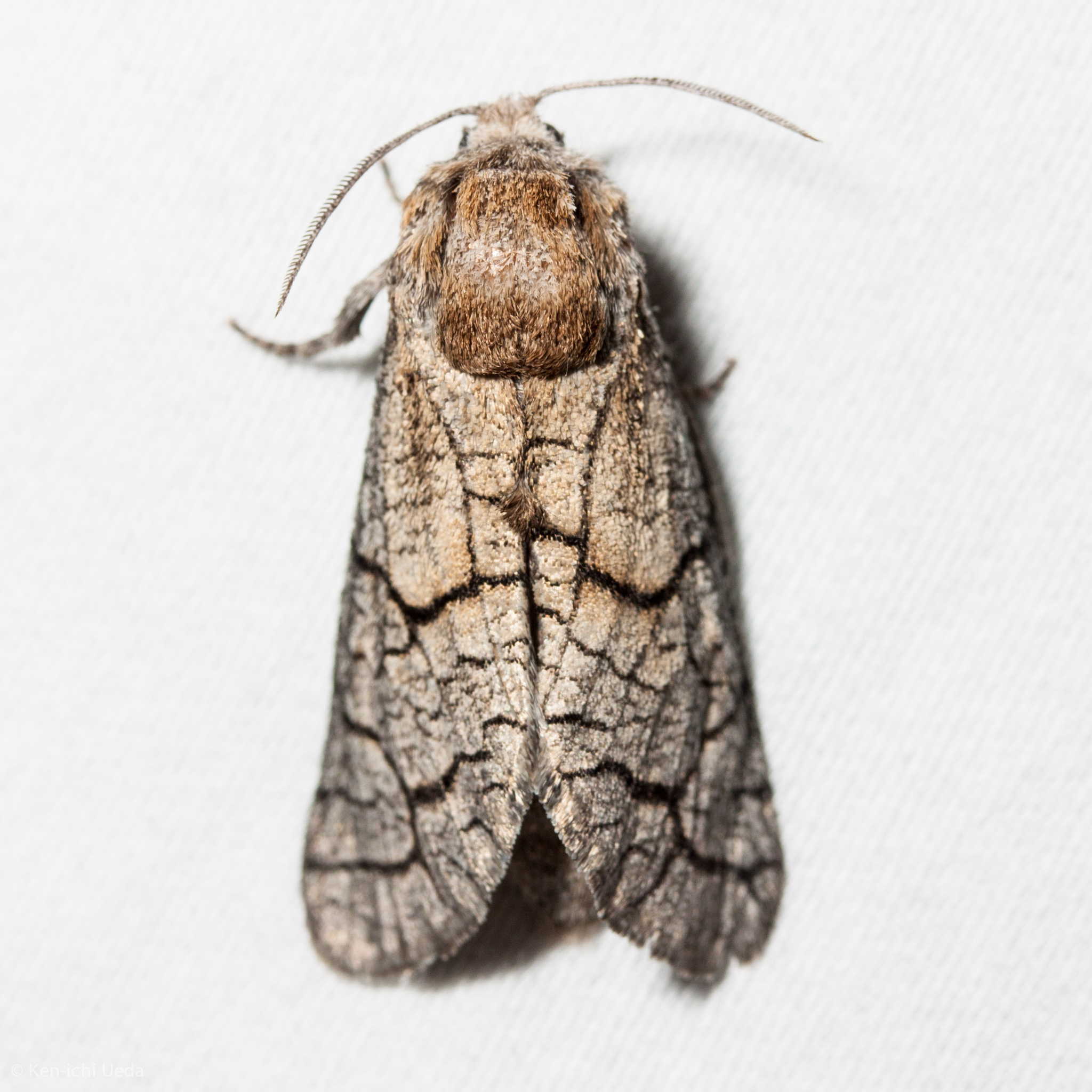
- Miacora perplexa

Scientific classification
- Kingdom: Animalia
- Phylum: Arthropoda
- Class: Insecta
- Order: Lepidoptera
- Family: Cossidae
- Subfamily: Cossinae
- Genus: Miacora; Dyar, 1905

Synonyms
- Toronia Barnes & McDunnough, 1911

= Miacora =

Genus of moths

Miacora is a genus of moths in the family Cossidae.

== Species ==
- Miacora adolescens (Dyar, 1914)
- Miacora diphyes Forbes, 1942
- Miacora leucocraspedontis Zukowsky, 1954
- Miacora luzena (Barnes, 1905)
- Miacora perplexa (Neumoegen & Dyar, 1893)
- Miacora tropicalis (Schaus, 1904)

== Former species ==
- Miacora roseobrunnea Dognin, 1917
