= Eogystia hippophaecolus =

Scientific classification
- Kingdom: Animalia
- Phylum: Arthropoda
- Clade: Pancrustacea
- Class: Insecta
- Order: Lepidoptera
- Family: Cossidae
- Genus: Eogystia
- Species: E. hippophaecolus

Binomial name
- Eogystia hippophaecolus (Hua, Chou, Fang & Chen, 1990)

Synonyms
- Holcocerus hippophaecolus Hua, Chou, Fang & Chen, 1990

Species of moth

Eogystia hippophaecolus is a moth in the family Cossidae. It is found in China (Shaanxi).
