= Reticulocossus =

Scientific classification
- Kingdom: Animalia
- Phylum: Arthropoda
- Clade: Pancrustacea
- Class: Insecta
- Order: Lepidoptera
- Family: Cossidae
- Subfamily: Cossinae
- Genus: Reticulocossus; Yakovlev, 2011
- Species: R. schoorli

Binomial name
- Reticulocossus schoorli (Yakovlev, 2004)

Synonyms
- Paracossus schoorli Yakovlev, 2004

Genus of moths

Reticulocossus is a genus of moths in the family Cossidae. It contains only one species, Reticulocossus schoorli, which is found in northern Sulawesi.
