= Acossus viktor =

Scientific classification
- Kingdom: Animalia
- Phylum: Arthropoda
- Clade: Pancrustacea
- Class: Insecta
- Order: Lepidoptera
- Family: Cossidae
- Genus: Acossus
- Species: A. viktor

Binomial name
- Acossus viktor (Yakovlev, 2004)

Synonyms
- Lamellocossus viktor Yakovlev, 2004

Species of moth

Acossus viktor is a species of moth of the family Cossidae. It is found in Russia, in southern Siberia and the southern part of the Tuva Republic.
