= Camellocossus =

Scientific classification
- Kingdom: Animalia
- Phylum: Arthropoda
- Clade: Pancrustacea
- Class: Insecta
- Order: Lepidoptera
- Family: Cossidae
- Subfamily: Cossinae
- Genus: Camellocossus; Yakovlev, 2011

Genus of moths

Camellocossus is a genus of moths in the family Cossidae.

== Species ==
- Camellocossus abyssinica
- Camellocossus henleyi
- Camellocossus osmanya
