= Camellocossus abyssinica =

Scientific classification
- Kingdom: Animalia
- Phylum: Arthropoda
- Class: Insecta
- Order: Lepidoptera
- Family: Cossidae
- Genus: Camellocossus
- Species: C. abyssinica

Binomial name
- Camellocossus abyssinica (Hampson, 1910)

Synonyms
- Cossus abyssinica Hampson, 1910; Cossus abyssinicus

Species of moth

Camellocossus abyssinica is a moth in the family Cossidae. It is found in Ethiopia, Mauritania and Yemen.
