= Gumilevia konkistador =

Scientific classification
- Kingdom: Animalia
- Phylum: Arthropoda
- Clade: Pancrustacea
- Class: Insecta
- Order: Lepidoptera
- Family: Cossidae
- Genus: Gumilevia
- Species: G. konkistador

Binomial name
- Gumilevia konkistador Yakovlev, 2011

Species of moth

Gumilevia konkistador is a moth in the family Cossidae. It was described by Yakovlev in 2011. It is found in South Sudan.
