= Gumilevia minettii =

Scientific classification
- Kingdom: Animalia
- Phylum: Arthropoda
- Clade: Pancrustacea
- Class: Insecta
- Order: Lepidoptera
- Family: Cossidae
- Genus: Gumilevia
- Species: G. minettii

Binomial name
- Gumilevia minettii Yakovlev, 2011

Species of moth

Gumilevia minettii is a moth in the family Cossidae. It was described by Yakovlev in 2011. It is found in Zambia.
