= Isoceras teheranica =

Scientific classification
- Domain: Eukaryota
- Kingdom: Animalia
- Phylum: Arthropoda
- Class: Insecta
- Order: Lepidoptera
- Family: Cossidae
- Genus: Isoceras
- Species: I. teheranica

Binomial name
- Isoceras teheranica Daniel, 1971

Species of moth

Isoceras teheranica is a moth in the family Cossidae. It was described by Franz Daniel in 1971. It is found in Iran.
