= Ronaldocossus =

Scientific classification
- Kingdom: Animalia
- Phylum: Arthropoda
- Clade: Pancrustacea
- Class: Insecta
- Order: Lepidoptera
- Family: Cossidae
- Subfamily: Cossinae
- Genus: Ronaldocossus; Yakovlev, 2006
- Species: R. brechlini

Binomial name
- Ronaldocossus brechlini Yakovlev, 2006

Species of moth

Ronaldocossus brechlini is a moth in the family Cossidae, and the only species in the genus Ronaldocossus. It is found in Sulawesi.

The length of the forewings is about 14.5 mm. The submarginal zone of the forewings is brown with a black band at the border of the postdiscal and submarginal areas. The hindwings uniform brown.

== Etymology ==
The genus and species are named in honour of Dr. Ronald Brechlin.
