= Prionoxystus piger =

Scientific classification
- Kingdom: Animalia
- Phylum: Arthropoda
- Class: Insecta
- Order: Lepidoptera
- Family: Cossidae
- Genus: Prionoxystus
- Species: P. piger

Binomial name
- Prionoxystus piger (Grote, 1865)

Synonyms
- Xyleutes piger Grote, [1866]; Prionoxystus baccharides Clarke, 1952

Species of moth

Prionoxystus piger, the baccharis carpenterworm moth, is a moth in the family Cossidae. It was described by Augustus Radcliffe Grote in 1865. It is found in Florida and Cuba.

Adults have been recorded on wing from February to April in Florida.

The larvae bore in the main stem of Baccharis species.
