= Miacora tropicalis =

Scientific classification
- Domain: Eukaryota
- Kingdom: Animalia
- Phylum: Arthropoda
- Class: Insecta
- Order: Lepidoptera
- Family: Cossidae
- Genus: Miacora
- Species: M. tropicalis

Binomial name
- Miacora tropicalis (Schaus, 1904)

Synonyms
- Cossus tropicalis Schaus, 1904

Species of moth

Miacora tropicalis is a moth in the family Cossidae. It was described by Schaus in 1904. It is found in Guyana.
