= Catopta cashmirensis =

Scientific classification
- Kingdom: Animalia
- Phylum: Arthropoda
- Clade: Pancrustacea
- Class: Insecta
- Order: Lepidoptera
- Family: Cossidae
- Genus: Catopta
- Species: C. cashmirensis

Binomial name
- Catopta cashmirensis (Moore, 1879)

Synonyms
- Zeuzera cashmirensis Moore, 1879; Cossus cashmirensis

Species of moth

Catopta cashmirensis is a moth in the family Cossidae. It is found in Kashmir, the north-western Himalayas in India, Nepal, Bhutan and China (Tibet, northern Yunnan).
