= Gumilevia =

Scientific classification
- Kingdom: Animalia
- Phylum: Arthropoda
- Clade: Pancrustacea
- Class: Insecta
- Order: Lepidoptera
- Family: Cossidae
- Subfamily: Cossinae
- Genus: Gumilevia; Yakovlev, 2011

Genus of moths

Gumilevia is a genus of moths in the family Cossidae.

== Species ==
- Gumilevia konkistador Yakovlev, 2011
- Gumilevia minettii Yakovlev, 2011
- Gumilevia timora Yakovlev, 2011
- Gumilevia zhiraph Yakovlev, 2011
