= Cossodes =

Scientific classification
- Domain: Eukaryota
- Kingdom: Animalia
- Phylum: Arthropoda
- Class: Insecta
- Order: Lepidoptera
- Family: Cossidae
- Subfamily: Cossinae
- Tribe: incertae sedis
- Genus: Cossodes; White, 1841
- Species: C. lyonetii

Binomial name
- Cossodes lyonetii White, 1841

Synonyms
- Tirema Herrich-Schäffer, 1854

Genus of moths

Cossodes is a monotypic moth genus in the family Cossidae. Its sole species, Cossodes lyonetii, is found in south-western Western Australia.

The wingspan is 55–58 mm for males and about 63 mm for females. Adults have been recorded on wing from December to March.

The larvae feed on Xanthorrhoea species.
