= Afrikanetz =

Scientific classification
- Kingdom: Animalia
- Phylum: Arthropoda
- Clade: Pancrustacea
- Class: Insecta
- Order: Lepidoptera
- Family: Cossidae
- Subfamily: Cossinae
- Genus: Afrikanetz; Yakovlev, 2009

Genus of moths

Afrikanetz is a genus of moths in the family Cossidae.

== Species ==
- Afrikanetz bugvan Yakovlev, 2009
- Afrikanetz inkubu Yakovlev, 2009
- Afrikanetz makumazan Yakovlev, 2009
