= Isoceras saxicola =

Scientific classification
- Domain: Eukaryota
- Kingdom: Animalia
- Phylum: Arthropoda
- Class: Insecta
- Order: Lepidoptera
- Family: Cossidae
- Genus: Isoceras
- Species: I. saxicola

Binomial name
- Isoceras saxicola (Christoph, 1885)

Synonyms
- Endagria saxicola Christoph, 1885

Species of moth

Isoceras saxicola is a moth in the family Cossidae. It was described by Hugo Theodor Christoph in 1885. It is found in Azerbaijan and Iran.
