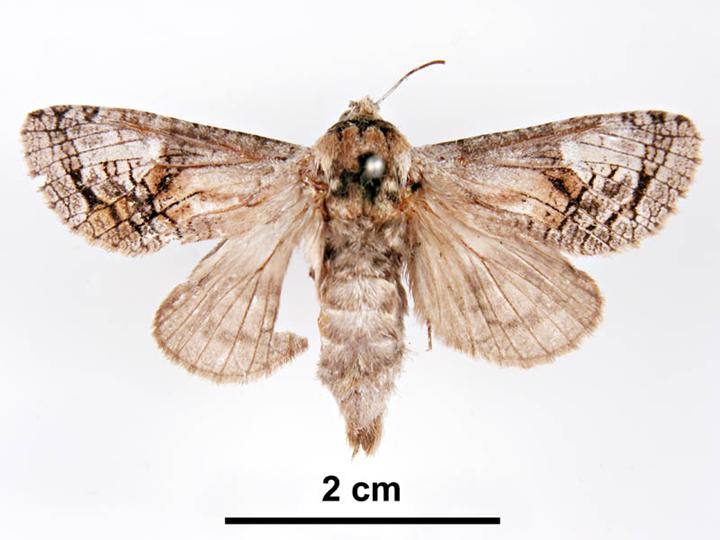
- Female, dorsal view
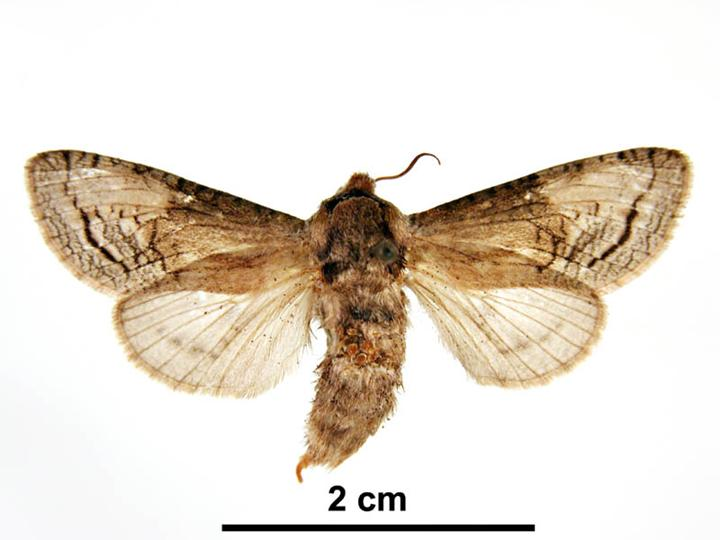
- Male, dorsal view

Scientific classification
- Kingdom: Animalia
- Phylum: Arthropoda
- Class: Insecta
- Order: Lepidoptera
- Family: Cossidae
- Subfamily: Cossinae
- Genus: Coryphodema; Felder, 1874
- Species: C. tristis

Binomial name
- Coryphodema tristis (Drury, 1782)

Synonyms
- Coryphodema capensis Felder, 1874; Coryphodema punctulata (Walker, 1856); Phalaena (Noctua) tristis Drury, 1782; Coryphodema capensis Felder, 1874; Brachionycha punctulata Walker, 1856; Cossus seineri Grünberg, 1910; Cossus streineri Dalla Torre, 1923

= Coryphodema =

Species of moth

Coryphodema tristis, the quince borer, sad goat or apple-trunk borer, is a moth of the family Cossidae. It is found in Botswana and South Africa.

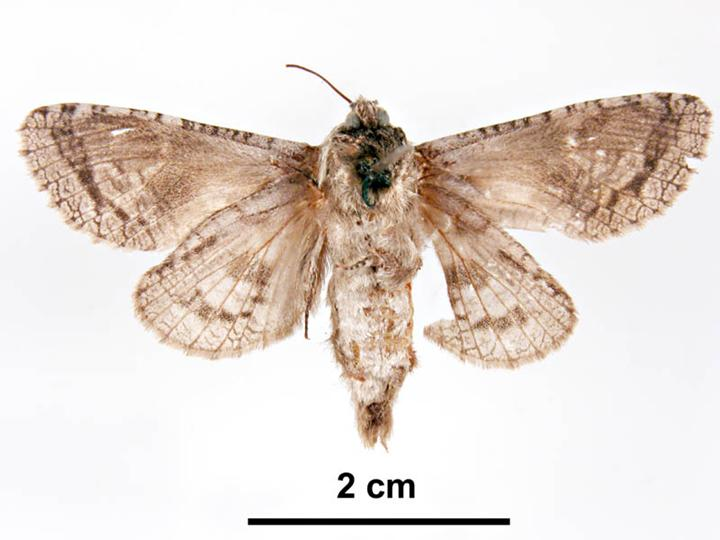
Female, ventral view

The wingspan is about 38 mm.

The larvae bore into the trunk of a wide range of plant, including species from the Combretaceae, Malvaceae, Myoporaceae, Rosaceae, Scorphulariaceae, Ulmaceae and Vitaceae. Some important hosts include Buddleja madagascariensis, Combretum, Malus and quince species. It has also been found feeding on Eucalyptus nitens.
