= Zeuzerocossus =

Scientific classification
- Kingdom: Animalia
- Phylum: Arthropoda
- Clade: Pancrustacea
- Class: Insecta
- Order: Lepidoptera
- Family: Cossidae
- Subfamily: Cossinae
- Genus: Zeuzerocossus; Yakovlev, 2008
- Species: Z. cinereus

Binomial name
- Zeuzerocossus cinereus (Roepke, 1957)

Synonyms
- Cossus cinereus Roepke, 1957; Paracossus cinereus

Species of insect

Zeuzerocossus cinereus is a moth in the family Cossidae, and the only species in the genus Zeuzerocossus. It is found on Borneo, Peninsular Malaysia and Sumatra. The habitat consists of lowland rainforests.

The forewings are pale grey with an inverted darker grey 'V'-shape.
