= Kerzhnerocossus =

Scientific classification
- Kingdom: Animalia
- Phylum: Arthropoda
- Clade: Pancrustacea
- Class: Insecta
- Order: Lepidoptera
- Family: Cossidae
- Subfamily: Cossinae
- Genus: Kerzhnerocossus; Yakovlev, 2011
- Species: K. sambainu

Binomial name
- Kerzhnerocossus sambainu Yakovlev, 2011

Genus of moths

Kerzhnerocossus is a monotypic genus of moths in the family Cossidae. It contains only one species, Kerzhnerocossus sambainu, which is found in Mongolia.
