= Sundacossus =

Scientific classification
- Kingdom: Animalia
- Phylum: Arthropoda
- Clade: Pancrustacea
- Class: Insecta
- Order: Lepidoptera
- Family: Cossidae
- Subfamily: Cossinae
- Genus: Sundacossus; Yakovlev, 2006

Type species
- Sundacossus timur Yakovlev, 2006

Genus of moths

Sundacossus is a genus of moths in the family Cossidae.

== Species ==
- Sundacossus gauguini Yakovlev, 2008
- Sundacossus rinjaniensis Yakovlev & Korzeev, 2022
- Sundacossus timur Yakovlev, 2006
