= Stygioides nupponenorum =

Scientific classification
- Kingdom: Animalia
- Phylum: Arthropoda
- Clade: Pancrustacea
- Class: Insecta
- Order: Lepidoptera
- Family: Cossidae
- Genus: Stygioides
- Species: S. nupponenorum

Binomial name
- Stygioides nupponenorum Yakovlev et Saldaitis, 2011

Species of moth

Stygioides nupponenorum is a species of moth of the family Cossidae. It is found in Turkey.
