= Pygmeocossus simao =

Scientific classification
- Kingdom: Animalia
- Phylum: Arthropoda
- Clade: Pancrustacea
- Class: Insecta
- Order: Lepidoptera
- Family: Cossidae
- Genus: Pygmeocossus
- Species: P. simao

Binomial name
- Pygmeocossus simao Yakovlev, 2009

Species of moth

Pygmeocossus simao is a moth in the family Cossidae. It is found in Yunnan, China.
