= Rethona =

Scientific classification
- Kingdom: Animalia
- Phylum: Arthropoda
- Class: Insecta
- Order: Lepidoptera
- Family: Cossidae
- Subfamily: Cossinae
- Genus: Rethona; Walker, 1855

Genus of moths

Rethona is a genus of moths in the family Cossidae.

== Species ==
- Rethona albifasciata (Hampson, 1910)
- Rethona strigosa Walker, 1855
