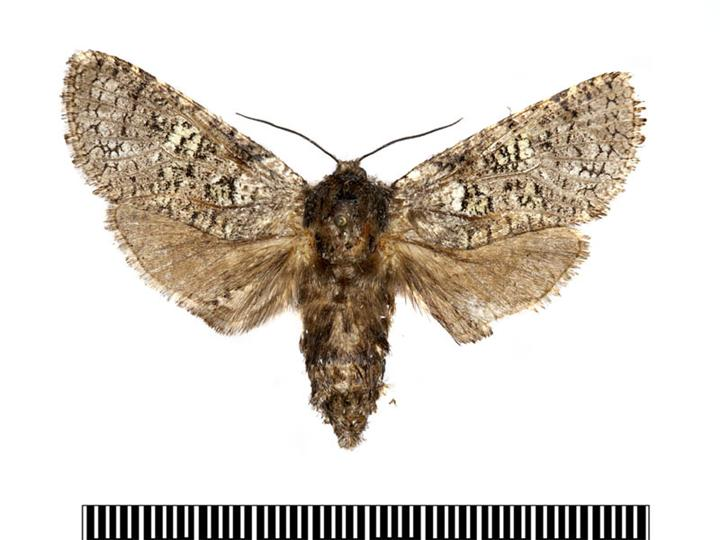

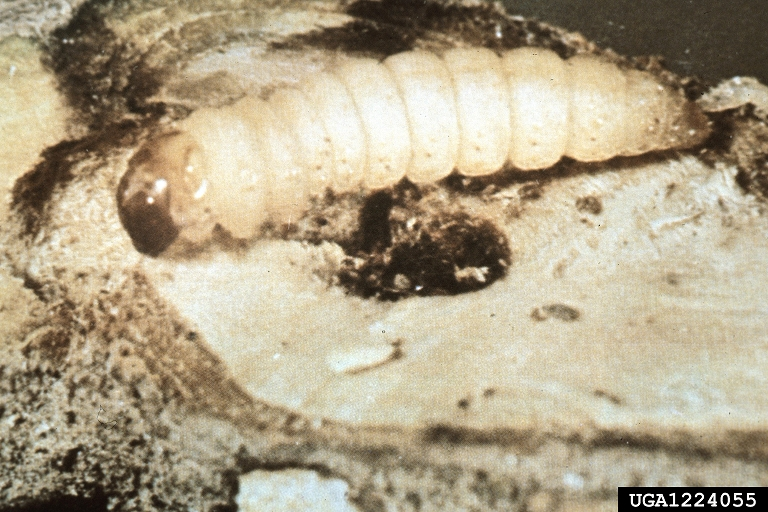

Scientific classification
- Domain: Eukaryota
- Kingdom: Animalia
- Phylum: Arthropoda
- Class: Insecta
- Order: Lepidoptera
- Family: Cossidae
- Genus: Chilecomadia
- Species: C. valdiviana

Binomial name
- Chilecomadia valdiviana (Philippi, 1860)

Synonyms
- Cossus valdiviana Philippi 1860; Langsdorlia valdiviana; Hypopta valdiviana

= Chilecomadia valdiviana =

Species of moth

Chilecomadia valdiviana is a moth of the family Cossidae. It is found in Argentina and Chile (from Atacama to Aisén).

The wingspan is 48–60 mm.

The larvae feed on Nothofagus and Salix species and are considered a pest in Chilean eucalyptus plantations. They have been reported on Eucalyptus globulus globulus, Eucalyptus nitens, Eucalyptus camaldulensis, Eucalyptus delegatensis and Eucalyptus viminalis.
