= Surcossus =

Scientific classification
- Kingdom: Animalia
- Phylum: Arthropoda
- Class: Insecta
- Order: Lepidoptera
- Family: Cossidae
- Subfamily: Cossinae
- Genus: Surcossus; Heimlich, 1960
- Species: S. perlaris

Binomial name
- Surcossus perlaris Heimlich, 1960

Species of moth

Surcossus perlaris is a moth in the family Cossidae, and the only species in the genus Surcossus. It was described by Heimlich in 1960 and is found in Chile.
