= Dieida ahngeri =

Scientific classification
- Domain: Eukaryota
- Kingdom: Animalia
- Phylum: Arthropoda
- Class: Insecta
- Order: Lepidoptera
- Family: Cossidae
- Genus: Dieida
- Species: D. ahngeri

Binomial name
- Dieida ahngeri (Grum-Grshimailo, 1902)

Synonyms
- Stygia ahngeri Grum-Grshimailo, 1902

Species of moth

Dieida ahngeri is a moth in the family Cossidae. It was described by Grigory Grum-Grshimailo in 1902. It is found in Transcaspia, where it has been recorded from Turkmenistan, Uzbekistan and Tajikistan.
