= Plyustchiella =

Scientific classification
- Kingdom: Animalia
- Phylum: Arthropoda
- Clade: Pancrustacea
- Class: Insecta
- Order: Lepidoptera
- Family: Cossidae
- Subfamily: Cossinae
- Genus: Plyustchiella; Yakovlev, 2006
- Species: P. gracilis

Binomial name
- Plyustchiella gracilis (Christoph, 1887)

Synonyms
- Holcocerus gracilis Christoph, 1887

Genus of moths

Plyustchiella is a genus of moths in the family Cossidae. It contains only one species, Plyustchiella gracilis, which is found in south-eastern Uzbekistan and Turkmenistan. The habitat consists of deserts.

The length of the forewings is 9–13 mm for males and 13–14 mm for females.

== Etymology ==
The genus is named in honour of Dr. Igor G. Plyustch.
