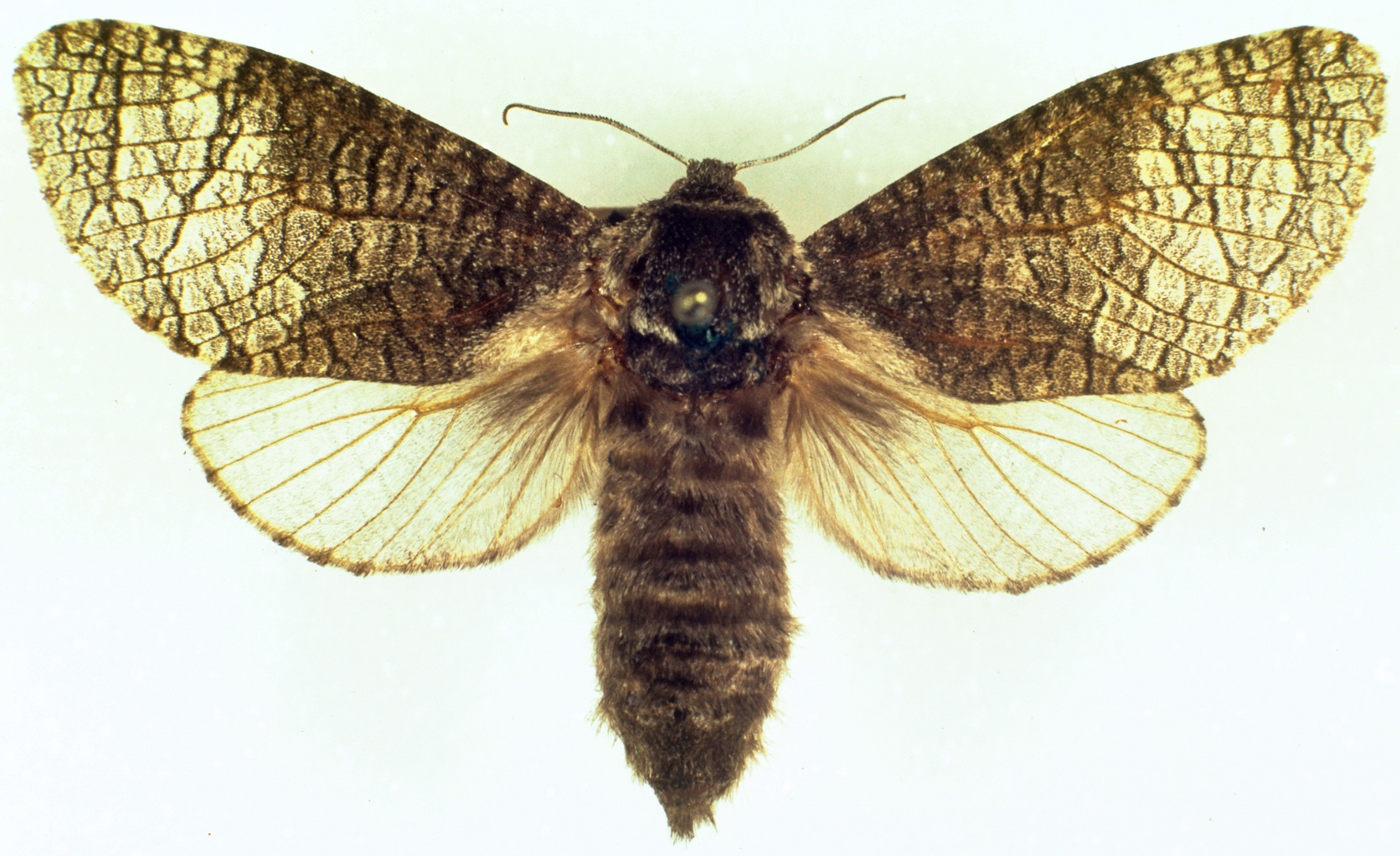

Scientific classification
- Domain: Eukaryota
- Kingdom: Animalia
- Phylum: Arthropoda
- Class: Insecta
- Order: Lepidoptera
- Family: Cossidae
- Genus: Acossus
- Species: A. centerensis

Binomial name
- Acossus centerensis (Lintner, 1877)

Synonyms
- Cossus centerensis Lintner, 1877

= Acossus centerensis =

Species of moth

Acossus centerensis, the poplar carpenterworm, is a moth of the family Cossidae. It is found in North America from New Jersey west to Illinois and North Dakota. In Canada it is found from Quebec and Ontario west to British Columbia.

The wingspan is 40–50 mm for males and 50–64 mm for females.

The larvae feed on Populus species, mainly Populus tremuloides, but also balsam poplars.
