= Catopta birmanopta =

Scientific classification
- Kingdom: Animalia
- Phylum: Arthropoda
- Class: Insecta
- Order: Lepidoptera
- Family: Cossidae
- Genus: Catopta
- Species: C. birmanopta

Binomial name
- Catopta birmanopta Bryk, 1950

Synonyms
- Catopta albonubilosus birmanopta Bryk, 1950

Species of moth

Catopta birmanopta is a moth in the family Cossidae. It was described by Felix Bryk in 1950. It is found in northern Myanmar.
