= Miacora luzena =

Scientific classification
- Domain: Eukaryota
- Kingdom: Animalia
- Phylum: Arthropoda
- Class: Insecta
- Order: Lepidoptera
- Family: Cossidae
- Genus: Miacora
- Species: M. luzena

Binomial name
- Miacora luzena (Barnes, 1905)

Synonyms
- Coccus luzena Barnes, 1905

Species of moth

Miacora luzena is a moth in the family Cossidae. It was described by William Barnes in 1905. It is found in North America, where it has been recorded from Arizona.

The wingspan is about 30 mm. Adults have been recorded on wing from June to July.
