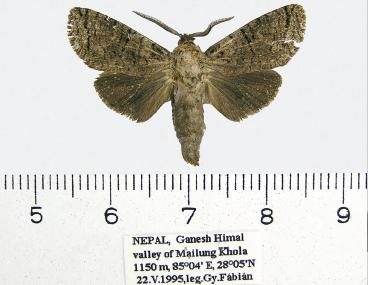

Scientific classification
- Kingdom: Animalia
- Phylum: Arthropoda
- Clade: Pancrustacea
- Class: Insecta
- Order: Lepidoptera
- Family: Cossidae
- Genus: Patoptoformis
- Species: P. ganesha

Binomial name
- Patoptoformis ganesha (Yakovlev, 2004)

Synonyms
- Patopta ganesha Yakovlev, 2004

= Patoptoformis ganesha =

Species of moth

Patoptoformis ganesha is a species of moth of the family Cossidae. It is found in Nepal.
