= Catopta albimacula =

Scientific classification
- Kingdom: Animalia
- Phylum: Arthropoda
- Clade: Pancrustacea
- Class: Insecta
- Order: Lepidoptera
- Family: Cossidae
- Genus: Catopta
- Species: C. albimacula

Binomial name
- Catopta albimacula Staudinger, 1899

Species of moth

Catopta albimacula is a moth in the family Cossidae. It was described by Staudinger in 1899. It is found in Kyrgyzstan, Kazakhstan, Tajikistan and China (Xinjiang Uyghur Autonomous Region).
