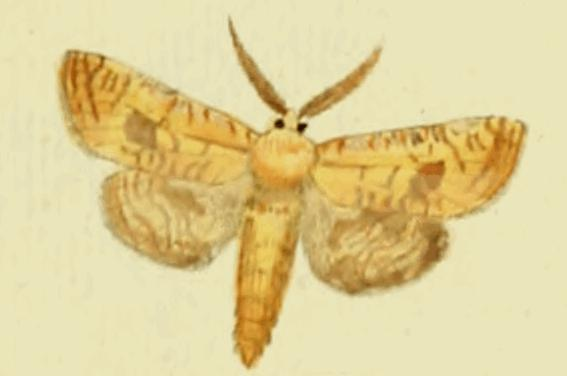

Scientific classification
- Kingdom: Animalia
- Phylum: Arthropoda
- Clade: Pancrustacea
- Class: Insecta
- Order: Lepidoptera
- Family: Cossidae
- Subfamily: Cossinae
- Genus: Paracossulus; Schoorl, 1990
- Species: P. thrips

Binomial name
- Paracossulus thrips (Hübner, 1818)

Synonyms
- Bombyx thrips Hübner, 1818; Catopta thrips; Hypopta thrips; Cossus fuchsiana Eversmann, 1832; Cossus kindermanni Freyer, 1836; Catopta thrips polonica Daniel, 1953

= Paracossulus =

Species of moth

Paracossulus thrips is a species of moth of the family Cossidae. It is found in Hungary, Romania, Ukraine, Russia, Kazakhstan and Turkey. The habitat consists of exclaves of open steppe vegetation on sands or loess and xerophilous grasslands on alkaline substrates.

The larvae bore the roots of Artemisia species.
