= Stygioides ivinskisi =

Scientific classification
- Kingdom: Animalia
- Phylum: Arthropoda
- Clade: Pancrustacea
- Class: Insecta
- Order: Lepidoptera
- Family: Cossidae
- Genus: Stygioides
- Species: S. ivinskisi

Binomial name
- Stygioides ivinskisi Saldaitis & Yakovlev, 2007

Species of moth

Stygioides ivinskisi is a species of moth of the family Cossidae. It is found in Lebanon.
