= Rethona albifasciata =

Scientific classification
- Kingdom: Animalia
- Phylum: Arthropoda
- Class: Insecta
- Order: Lepidoptera
- Family: Cossidae
- Genus: Rethona
- Species: R. albifasciata

Binomial name
- Rethona albifasciata (Hampson, 1910)

Synonyms
- Coryphodema albifasciata Hampson, 1910

Species of moth

Rethona albifasciata is a moth in the family Cossidae. It is found in South Africa.
