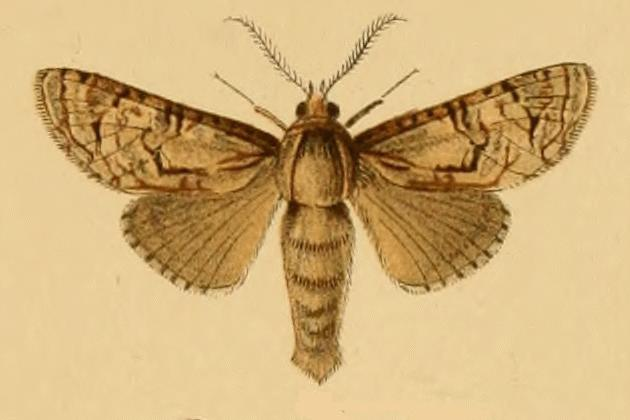

Scientific classification
- Kingdom: Animalia
- Phylum: Arthropoda
- Class: Insecta
- Order: Lepidoptera
- Family: Cossidae
- Genus: Paropta
- Species: P. l-nigrum

Binomial name
- Paropta l-nigrum (Bethune-Baker, 1894)

Synonyms
- Cossus l-nigrum Bethune-Baker, 1894

= Paropta l-nigrum =

Species of moth

Paropta l-nigrum is a species of moth of the family Cossidae. It is found on Cyprus.

The wingspan is 36–39 mm. The forewings are ashen grey. The hindwings are uniform brownish grey.
