= Miacora adolescens =

Scientific classification
- Domain: Eukaryota
- Kingdom: Animalia
- Phylum: Arthropoda
- Class: Insecta
- Order: Lepidoptera
- Family: Cossidae
- Genus: Miacora
- Species: M. adolescens

Binomial name
- Miacora adolescens (Dyar, 1914)

Synonyms
- Toronia adolescens Dyar, 1914

Species of insect

Miacora adolescens is a moth in the family Cossidae. It was described by Harrison Gray Dyar Jr. in 1914. It is found in Panama.
