= Pygmeocossus tonga =

Scientific classification
- Kingdom: Animalia
- Phylum: Arthropoda
- Clade: Pancrustacea
- Class: Insecta
- Order: Lepidoptera
- Family: Cossidae
- Genus: Pygmeocossus
- Species: P. tonga

Binomial name
- Pygmeocossus tonga Yakovlev, 2005

Species of moth

Pygmeocossus tonga is a moth in the family Cossidae. It is found on the Andaman Islands of India.
