= Eogystia sibirica =

Scientific classification
- Kingdom: Animalia
- Phylum: Arthropoda
- Class: Insecta
- Order: Lepidoptera
- Family: Cossidae
- Genus: Eogystia
- Species: E. sibirica

Binomial name
- Eogystia sibirica (Alphéraky, 1895)

Synonyms
- Hypopta sibirica Alphéraky, 1895; Isoceras sibirica

Species of moth

Eogystia sibirica is a moth in the family Cossidae. It is found in north-eastern Russia, Mongolia and northern China.

== Subspecies ==
- Eogystia sibirica sibirica
- Eogystia sibirica krusheki Yakovlev, 2007 (Mongolia)
