= Koboldocossus =

Scientific classification
- Kingdom: Animalia
- Phylum: Arthropoda
- Clade: Pancrustacea
- Class: Insecta
- Order: Lepidoptera
- Family: Cossidae
- Subfamily: Cossinae
- Genus: Koboldocossus; Yakovlev, 2011
- Species: K. nigrostriatus

Binomial name
- Koboldocossus nigrostriatus Yakovlev, 2011

Genus of moths

Koboldocossus is a monotypic moth genus in the family Cossidae. Its only species, Koboldocossus nigrostriatus, is found in Tanzania.
