= Trigena =

Scientific classification
- Kingdom: Animalia
- Phylum: Arthropoda
- Class: Insecta
- Order: Lepidoptera
- Family: Cossidae
- Subfamily: Cossinae
- Genus: Trigena; Dyar, 1905

Genus of moths

Trigena is a genus of moths in the family Cossidae.

== Species ==
- Trigena breyeri Ureta, 1957
- Trigena crassa Schaus, 1911
- Trigena granulosa Ureta, 1957
- Trigena serenensis Ureta, 1957
- Trigena terranea Ureta, 1957
- Trigena parilis Schaus, 1892
