= Psychidocossus =

Scientific classification
- Domain: Eukaryota
- Kingdom: Animalia
- Phylum: Arthropoda
- Class: Insecta
- Order: Lepidoptera
- Family: Cossidae
- Subfamily: Cossinae
- Genus: Psychidocossus; D. S. Fletcher, 1982
- Species: P. infantilis

Binomial name
- Psychidocossus infantilis (Schaus, 1911)

Synonyms
- Psychopsis Dyar, 1940 (preocc. Newman, 1842); Cossus infantilis Schaus, 1911; Psychopsis infantilis

Genus of moths

Psychidocossus is a monotypic moth genus in the family Cossidae described by David Stephen Fletcher in 1982. Its one species, Psychidocossus infantilis, described by William Schaus in 1911, is found in Costa Rica.
