= Catopta kendevanensis =

Scientific classification
- Domain: Eukaryota
- Kingdom: Animalia
- Phylum: Arthropoda
- Class: Insecta
- Order: Lepidoptera
- Family: Cossidae
- Genus: Catopta
- Species: C. kendevanensis

Binomial name
- Catopta kendevanensis Daniel, 1937

Species of moth

Catopta kendevanensis is a moth in the family Cossidae. It was described by Franz Daniel in 1937. It is found in Iran and Afghanistan.

== Subspecies ==
- Catopta kendevanensis kendevanensis (northern and central Iran)
- Catopta kendevanensis anjumanica Daniel, 1964 (north-eastern and central Afghanistan)
