= Catopta kansuensis =

Scientific classification
- Kingdom: Animalia
- Phylum: Arthropoda
- Class: Insecta
- Order: Lepidoptera
- Family: Cossidae
- Genus: Catopta
- Species: C. kansuensis

Binomial name
- Catopta kansuensis Bryk, 1942

Synonyms
- Catopta albonubilosus kansuensis Bryk, 1942

Species of moth

Catopta kansuensis is a moth in the family Cossidae. It was described by Felix Bryk in 1942. It is found in the Chinese provinces of Gansu and Qinghai.
