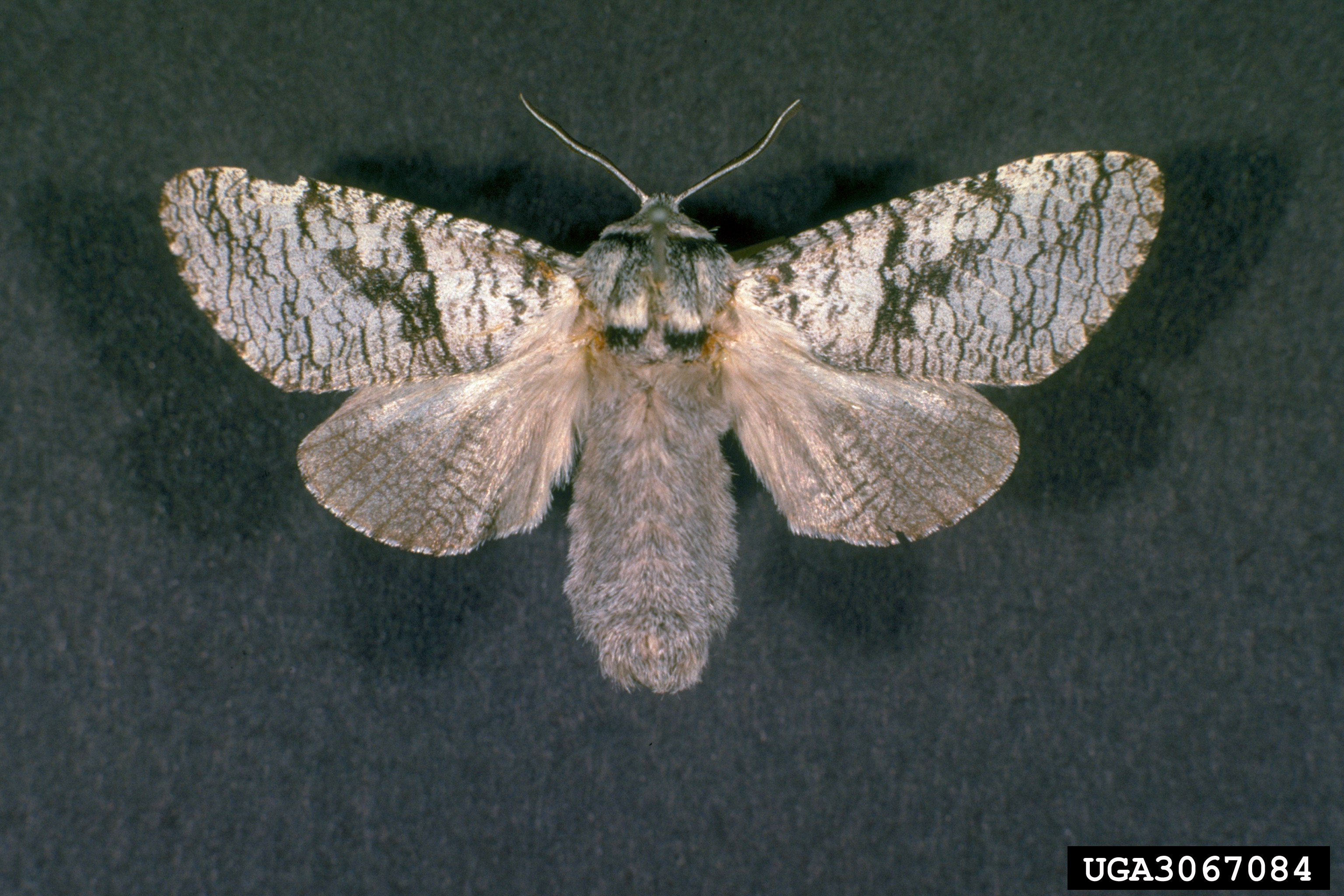

Scientific classification
- Kingdom: Animalia
- Phylum: Arthropoda
- Class: Insecta
- Order: Lepidoptera
- Family: Cossidae
- Genus: Acossus
- Species: A. populi

Binomial name
- Acossus populi (Walker, 1856)

Synonyms
- Cossus populi Walker, 1856; Cossus orc Strecker 1893; Acossus generosus Dyar, 1925; Cossus angrezi Bailey, 1882

= Acossus populi =

Species of moth

Acossus populi, the aspen carpenterworm, is a moth of the family Cossidae. It is found in the United States in Nevada, Colorado, California and in the northern Rocky Mountains. In Canada it is found in Ontario and British Columbia.

The wingspan is 50–68 mm.

The larvae feed on Populus species, mainly Populus tremuloides.

== Subspecies ==
- Acossus populi populi
- Acossus populi angrezi (Bailey, 1882)
- Acossus populi orc (Strecker, 1893)
