= Catopta grumi =

Scientific classification
- Kingdom: Animalia
- Phylum: Arthropoda
- Clade: Pancrustacea
- Class: Insecta
- Order: Lepidoptera
- Family: Cossidae
- Genus: Catopta
- Species: C. grumi

Binomial name
- Catopta grumi R.V. Yakovlev, 2009

Species of moth

Catopta grumi is a moth in the family Cossidae. It was described by R.V. Yakovlev in 2009. It is found in China (Quinghai).
