= Catopta sikkimensis =

Scientific classification
- Domain: Eukaryota
- Kingdom: Animalia
- Phylum: Arthropoda
- Class: Insecta
- Order: Lepidoptera
- Family: Cossidae
- Genus: Catopta
- Species: C. sikkimensis

Binomial name
- Catopta sikkimensis (Arora, 1965)

Synonyms
- Cossus sikkimensis Arora, 1965

Species of moth

Catopta sikkimensis is a moth in the family Cossidae. It was described by G.S. Arora in 1965. It is found in Sikkim, India.
