= Cryptoholcocerus =

Scientific classification
- Kingdom: Animalia
- Phylum: Arthropoda
- Clade: Pancrustacea
- Class: Insecta
- Order: Lepidoptera
- Family: Cossidae
- Subfamily: Cossinae
- Genus: Cryptoholcocerus; Yakovlev, 2006
- Species: C. mongolicus

Binomial name
- Cryptoholcocerus mongolicus (Erschoff in Alpheraky, 1882)

Synonyms
- Cossus mongolicus Erschoff, 1882; Holcocerus nigrescens Rothschild, 1912

Genus of moths

Cryptoholcocerus is a monotypic moth genus in the family Cossidae. Its sole species, Cryptoholcocerus mongolicus, is found in south-eastern Kazakhstan, Kirghizistan, Uzbekistan, Tajikistan, Pakistan, Afghanistan and north-western China, where it is found at elevations ranging from 400 to 3,750 meters.

The length of the forewings is 20–28 mm for males and 28–35 mm for females. Adults are on wing from June to August.
