= Franzdanielia =

Scientific classification
- Kingdom: Animalia
- Phylum: Arthropoda
- Clade: Pancrustacea
- Class: Insecta
- Order: Lepidoptera
- Family: Cossidae
- Subfamily: Cossinae
- Genus: Franzdanielia; Yakovlev, 2006
- Species: F. likiangi

Binomial name
- Franzdanielia likiangi (Daniel, 1940)

Synonyms
- Generic; Frantsdanielia Yakovlev, 2007; Specific; Cossus likiangi Daniel, 1940; Holcocerus likiangi; Frantsdanielia likiangi Daniel, 1940

Genus of moth

Franzdanielia is a monotypic moth genus in the family Cossidae. Its sole species, Franzdanielia likiangi, is found in China (Yunnan, Sichuan).

The length of the forewings is 21–24 mm. Adults are on wing from June to July.

== Etymology ==
The genus is named in honour of Dr. Franz Daniel.
