= Chiangmaiana buddhi =

Scientific classification
- Kingdom: Animalia
- Phylum: Arthropoda
- Clade: Pancrustacea
- Class: Insecta
- Order: Lepidoptera
- Family: Cossidae
- Genus: Chiangmaiana
- Species: C. buddhi

Binomial name
- Chiangmaiana buddhi (Yakovlev, 2004)

Synonyms
- Nirvana buddhi Yakovlev, 2004

Species of moth

Chiangmaiana buddhi is a moth in the family Cossidae. It is found in Thailand.
