= Afrikanetz inkubu =

Scientific classification
- Kingdom: Animalia
- Phylum: Arthropoda
- Clade: Pancrustacea
- Class: Insecta
- Order: Lepidoptera
- Family: Cossidae
- Genus: Afrikanetz
- Species: A. inkubu

Binomial name
- Afrikanetz inkubu Yakovlev, 2009

Species of moth

Afrikanetz inkubu is a moth in the family Cossidae. It is found in the Republic of Congo.
