= Catopta tropicalis =

Scientific classification
- Kingdom: Animalia
- Phylum: Arthropoda
- Clade: Pancrustacea
- Class: Insecta
- Order: Lepidoptera
- Family: Cossidae
- Genus: Catopta
- Species: C. tropicalis

Binomial name
- Catopta tropicalis Yakovlev & Witt, 2009

Species of moth

Catopta tropicalis is a moth in the family Cossidae. It was described by Yakovlev and Witt in 2009. It is found in northern Vietnam.
