= Alcterogystia l-nigra =

Scientific classification
- Kingdom: Animalia
- Phylum: Arthropoda
- Class: Insecta
- Order: Lepidoptera
- Family: Cossidae
- Genus: Alcterogystia
- Species: A. l-nigra

Binomial name
- Alcterogystia l-nigra (Bethune-Baker, 1894)

Synonyms
- Cossus l-nigra Bethune-Baker, 1894; Paropta l-nigra

Species of moth

Alcterogystia l-nigra is a moth in the family Cossidae. It is found in Egypt, Yemen, Saudi Arabia and Oman.
