= Gumilevia zhiraph =

Scientific classification
- Kingdom: Animalia
- Phylum: Arthropoda
- Clade: Pancrustacea
- Class: Insecta
- Order: Lepidoptera
- Family: Cossidae
- Genus: Gumilevia
- Species: G. zhiraph

Binomial name
- Gumilevia zhiraph Yakovlev, 2011

Species of moth

Gumilevia zhiraph is a moth in the family Cossidae. It was described by Yakovlev in 2011. It is found in Uganda and the Democratic Republic of Congo.
