= Stygioides psyche =

Scientific classification
- Kingdom: Animalia
- Phylum: Arthropoda
- Class: Insecta
- Order: Lepidoptera
- Family: Cossidae
- Genus: Stygioides
- Species: S. psyche

Binomial name
- Stygioides psyche (Grum-Grshimailo, 1893)

Synonyms
- Stygia psyche Grum-Grshimailo, 1893

Species of moth

Stygioides psyche is a species of moth of the family Cossidae. It is found in the Kyzylkumy desert in Uzbekistan.
