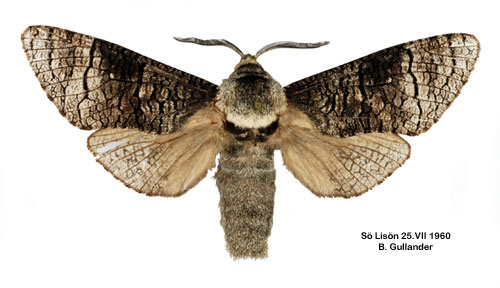

Scientific classification
- Domain: Eukaryota
- Kingdom: Animalia
- Phylum: Arthropoda
- Class: Insecta
- Order: Lepidoptera
- Family: Cossidae
- Genus: Acossus
- Species: A. terebra

Binomial name
- Acossus terebra (Denis & Schiffermüller, 1775)

Synonyms
- Bombyx terebra Denis & Schiffermüller, 1775; Lamellocossus terebra; Acossus terebrus

= Acossus terebra =

Species of moth

Acossus terebra is a species of moth of the family Cossidae. It is found in Eurasia, including Israel, Turkey, northern Spain, central and southern Europe, southern Sweden, Finland, the Baltic region, Ukraine, the central part of European Russia, the Caucasus, southern Siberia (including the Altai and Sayan Mountains) to southern Yakutia, the southern part of the Russian Far East, Korea, Heilongjiang, Jilin and inner Mongolia.

The wingspan is 55–64 mm. Adults are on wing from June to August.

The larvae feed on Populus tremula.
