= Dervishiya vartianae =

Scientific classification
- Kingdom: Animalia
- Phylum: Arthropoda
- Class: Insecta
- Order: Lepidoptera
- Family: Cossidae
- Genus: Dervishiya
- Species: D. vartianae

Binomial name
- Dervishiya vartianae Yakovlev, 2011

Species of moth

Dervishiya vartianae is a moth in the family Cossidae. It is found in Afghanistan.
