= Camellocossus osmanya =

Scientific classification
- Kingdom: Animalia
- Phylum: Arthropoda
- Clade: Pancrustacea
- Class: Insecta
- Order: Lepidoptera
- Family: Cossidae
- Genus: Camellocossus
- Species: C. osmanya

Binomial name
- Camellocossus osmanya Yakovlev, 2011

Species of moth

Camellocossus osmanya is a moth in the family Cossidae. It is found in Somalia.
