= Miacora diphyes =

Scientific classification
- Kingdom: Animalia
- Phylum: Arthropoda
- Clade: Pancrustacea
- Class: Insecta
- Order: Lepidoptera
- Family: Cossidae
- Genus: Miacora
- Species: M. diphyes

Binomial name
- Miacora diphyes Forbes, 1942

Species of moth

Miacora diphyes is a moth in the family Cossidae. It was described by William Trowbridge Merrifield Forbes in 1942. It is found in Panama.
