= Paropta paradoxus =

Scientific classification
- Domain: Eukaryota
- Kingdom: Animalia
- Phylum: Arthropoda
- Class: Insecta
- Order: Lepidoptera
- Family: Cossidae
- Genus: Paropta
- Species: P. paradoxus

Binomial name
- Paropta paradoxus (Herrich-Schäffer, [1851])

Synonyms
- Cossus paradoxus Herrich-Schäffer, [1851]; Paropta paradoxa; Paropta paradoxum

Species of moth

Paropta paradoxus is a species of moth of the family Cossidae. It is found on Cyprus and Rhodes and in Lebanon, Syria, Egypt, Saudi Arabia, Israel, Iran and Jordan.

The wingspan is about 33 mm. Adults are on wing from December to February in Israel.

The larvae have been recorded feeding on Vitis species, Ficus carica, Ficus pseudosycramorus, Acacia arabica, Cercis siliquastrum and Crataegus species.

== Subspecies ==
- Paropta paradoxus paradoxus
- Paropta paradoxus kathikas Yakovlev & Lewandowski, 2007 (Cyprus)
