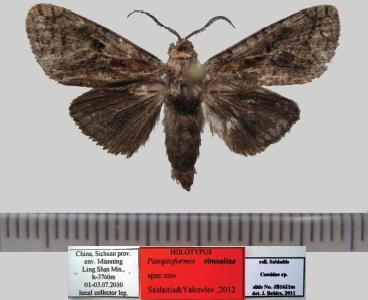

Scientific classification
- Kingdom: Animalia
- Phylum: Arthropoda
- Clade: Pancrustacea
- Class: Insecta
- Order: Lepidoptera
- Family: Cossidae
- Genus: Patoptoformis
- Species: P. rimsaitae

Binomial name
- Patoptoformis rimsaitae Saldaitis & Yakovlev, 2012

= Patoptoformis rimsaitae =

Species of moth

Patoptoformis rimsaitae is a species of moth of the family Cossidae. It is found in China (Sichuan, on the eastern edge of the Tibetan plateau).

The wingspan is about 24 mm.
