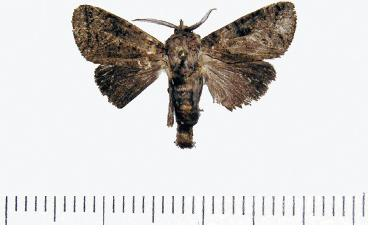
- Male
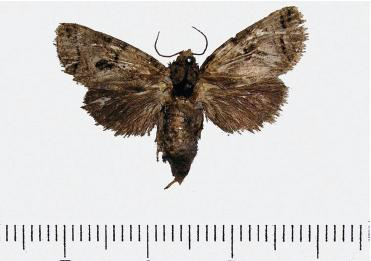
- Female

Scientific classification
- Kingdom: Animalia
- Phylum: Arthropoda
- Clade: Pancrustacea
- Class: Insecta
- Order: Lepidoptera
- Family: Cossidae
- Genus: Patoptoformis
- Species: P. hanuman

Binomial name
- Patoptoformis hanuman Yakovlev, 2006

= Patoptoformis hanuman =

Species of moth

Patoptoformis hanuman is a species of moth of the family Cossidae. It is found in India (Assam).

== Etymology ==
The species is named from Hanuman, a sacral monkey in Indian mythology.
