= Catopta griseotincta =

Scientific classification
- Domain: Eukaryota
- Kingdom: Animalia
- Phylum: Arthropoda
- Class: Insecta
- Order: Lepidoptera
- Family: Cossidae
- Genus: Catopta
- Species: C. griseotincta

Binomial name
- Catopta griseotincta Daniel, 1940

Species of moth

Catopta griseotincta is a moth in the family Cossidae. It was described by Franz Daniel in 1940. It is found in China in Tibet, northern Yunnan and Sichuan.
