= Sundacossus timur =

Scientific classification
- Kingdom: Animalia
- Phylum: Arthropoda
- Clade: Pancrustacea
- Class: Insecta
- Order: Lepidoptera
- Family: Cossidae
- Genus: Sundacossus
- Species: S. timur

Binomial name
- Sundacossus timur Yakovlev, 2006

Species of moth

Sundacossus timur is a moth in the family Cossidae. It was described by Yakovlev in 2006. It is found on Flores.

The length of the forewings is about 26 mm.
