= Afrikanetz makumazan =

Scientific classification
- Kingdom: Animalia
- Phylum: Arthropoda
- Clade: Pancrustacea
- Class: Insecta
- Order: Lepidoptera
- Family: Cossidae
- Genus: Afrikanetz
- Species: A. makumazan

Binomial name
- Afrikanetz makumazan Yakovlev, 2009

Species of moth

Afrikanetz makumazan is a moth in the family Cossidae. It is found in Saudi Arabia.
