= Stygioides persephone =

Scientific classification
- Domain: Eukaryota
- Kingdom: Animalia
- Phylum: Arthropoda
- Class: Insecta
- Order: Lepidoptera
- Family: Cossidae
- Genus: Stygioides
- Species: S. persephone

Binomial name
- Stygioides persephone (Reisser, 1962)

Synonyms
- Danielostygia persephone Reisser, 1962

Species of moth

Stygioides persephone is a species of moth of the family Cossidae. It is found on Crete.
