= Dieidapersa =

Scientific classification
- Kingdom: Animalia
- Phylum: Arthropoda
- Class: Insecta
- Order: Lepidoptera
- Family: Cossidae
- Subfamily: Cossinae
- Genus: Dieidapersa; Strand in Stichel, 1911
- Species: D. persa

Binomial name
- Dieidapersa persa (Strand in Stichel, 1911)

Synonyms
- Dieida persa Strand in Stichel, 1911; Dieida ledereri var. persa Strand, 1911

Genus of moths

Dieidapersa is a monotypic moth genus in the family Cossidae. Its only species is Dieidapersa persa, which is found in Iran.
