= Groenendaelia =

Scientific classification
- Kingdom: Animalia
- Phylum: Arthropoda
- Clade: Pancrustacea
- Class: Insecta
- Order: Lepidoptera
- Family: Cossidae
- Subfamily: Cossinae
- Genus: Groenendaelia; Yakovlev, 2004
- Species: G. kinabaluensis

Binomial name
- Groenendaelia kinabaluensis (Gaede, 1933)

Synonyms
- Cossus kinabaluensis Gaede, 1933; Holcocerus kinabaluensis

Genus of moths

Groenendaelia is a monotypic moth genus in the family Cossidae. Its only species, Groenendaelia kinabaluensis, is found in Sundaland, including Borneo. The habitat consists of montane forests and lowland areas.

The forewings are brown, divided from the striated bone grey apical area by a concave margin.
