= Dieida ledereri =

Scientific classification
- Domain: Eukaryota
- Kingdom: Animalia
- Phylum: Arthropoda
- Class: Insecta
- Order: Lepidoptera
- Family: Cossidae
- Genus: Dieida
- Species: D. ledereri

Binomial name
- Dieida ledereri (Staudinger, 1871)

Synonyms
- Stygia ledereri Staudinger, 1871; Typhonia stygiella Bruand, 1852

Species of moth

Dieida ledereri is a species of moth of the family Cossidae. It is found in Iran, Syria, Israel and Turkey.

Adults have been recorded on wing in March in Israel.
