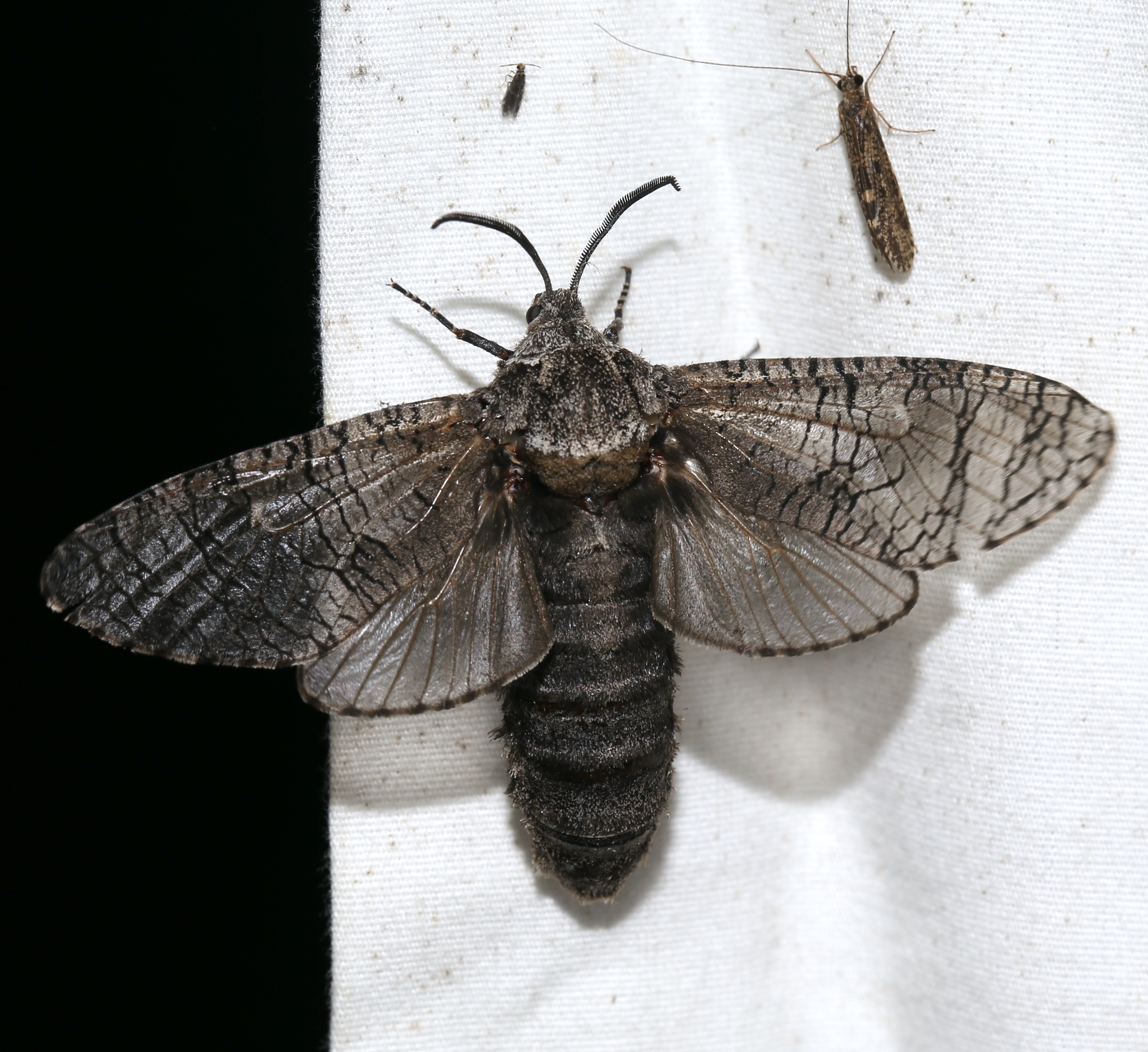

Scientific classification
- Kingdom: Animalia
- Phylum: Arthropoda
- Clade: Pancrustacea
- Class: Insecta
- Order: Lepidoptera
- Family: Cossidae
- Genus: Prionoxystus
- Species: P. macmurtrei

Binomial name
- Prionoxystus macmurtrei Guérin-Méneville, 1829

Synonyms
- Cossus macmurei Guérin-Méneville, 1829; Cossus querciperda Fitch, 1859; Prionoxystus querciperda

= Prionoxystus macmurtrei =

Species of moth

Prionoxystus macmurtrei, the little carpenterworm moth, is a moth of the family Cossidae. It is found in Ontario, Quebec, Florida, west to Texas, and north to Minnesota.

The wingspan is 45–75 mm. Adults are on wing from April to July.

The larvae feed on ash, maple and oak. The species is considered a pest, because the tunnels the larvae create decrease the value of hardwood lumber.
