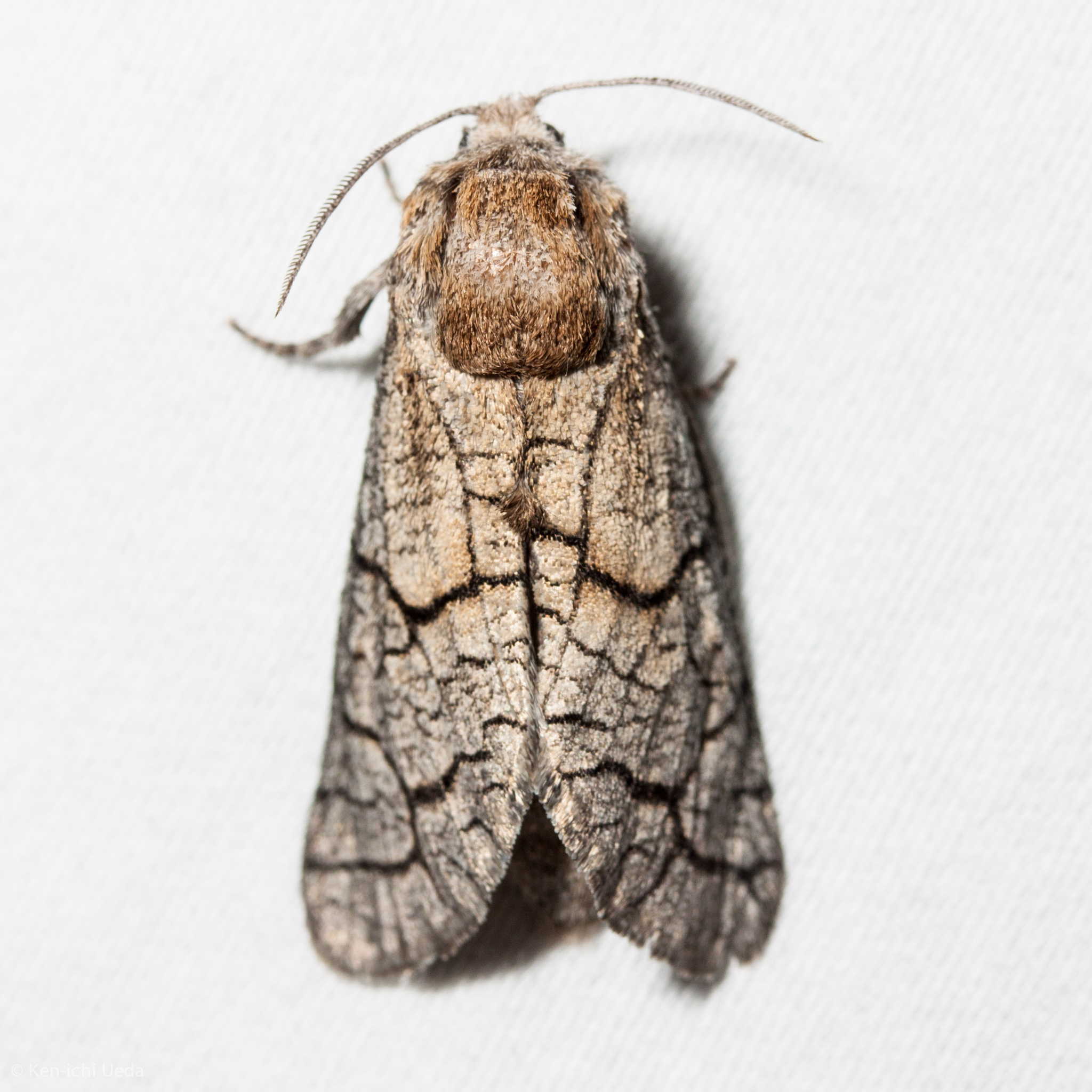

Scientific classification
- Kingdom: Animalia
- Phylum: Arthropoda
- Clade: Pancrustacea
- Class: Insecta
- Order: Lepidoptera
- Family: Cossidae
- Genus: Miacora
- Species: M. perplexa

Binomial name
- Miacora perplexa (Neumoegen & Dyar, 1893)

Synonyms
- Trypanus perplexus Neumoegen & Dyar, 1893; Cossus perplexus; Toronia perplexa; Miacora perplexus

= Miacora perplexa =

Species of moth

Miacora perplexa is a moth in the family Cossidae. It is found in North America, where it has been recorded from Colorado and western Texas to California and Oregon. The habitat consists of montane areas.

The length of the forewings is 17–21 mm (0.67–0.83 in) for males and 20–24 mm (0.79–0.94 in) for females. Adults have been recorded on wing from May to September.
