= Catopta eberti =

Scientific classification
- Domain: Eukaryota
- Kingdom: Animalia
- Phylum: Arthropoda
- Class: Insecta
- Order: Lepidoptera
- Family: Cossidae
- Genus: Catopta
- Species: C. eberti

Binomial name
- Catopta eberti Daniel, 1964

Species of moth

Catopta eberti is a moth in the family Cossidae. It was described by Franz Daniel in 1964. It is found in Afghanistan.
