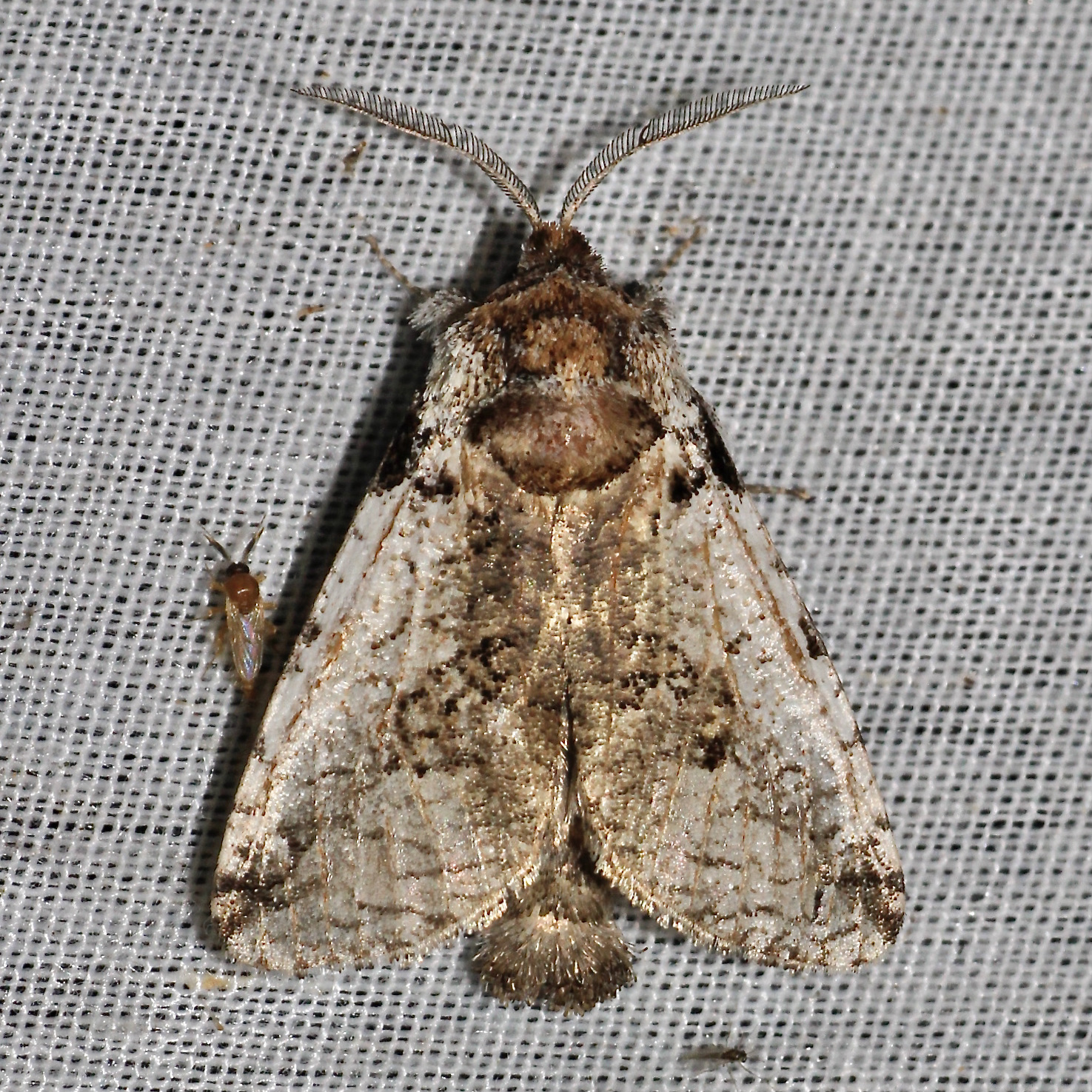
- Kalimantanossus microgenitalis from Sabah, Borneo

Scientific classification
- Kingdom: Animalia
- Phylum: Arthropoda
- Clade: Pancrustacea
- Class: Insecta
- Order: Lepidoptera
- Family: Cossidae
- Subfamily: Cossinae
- Tribe: Cossini
- Genus: Kalimantanossus; Yakovlev, 2011

= Kalimantanossus =

Genus of moths

Kalimantanossus is a genus of moths in the family Cossidae with two species from Southeast Asia. Kalimantanossus microgenitalis, was found on Borneo and Kalimantanossus kongkeoi was recently described in Laos, Xiangkhouang Province by Roman Yakovlev.

== Species ==
The genus includes 2 species:

- Kalimantanossus microgenitalis Yakovlev, 2004
- Kalimantanossus kongkeoi Yakovlev, 2023
