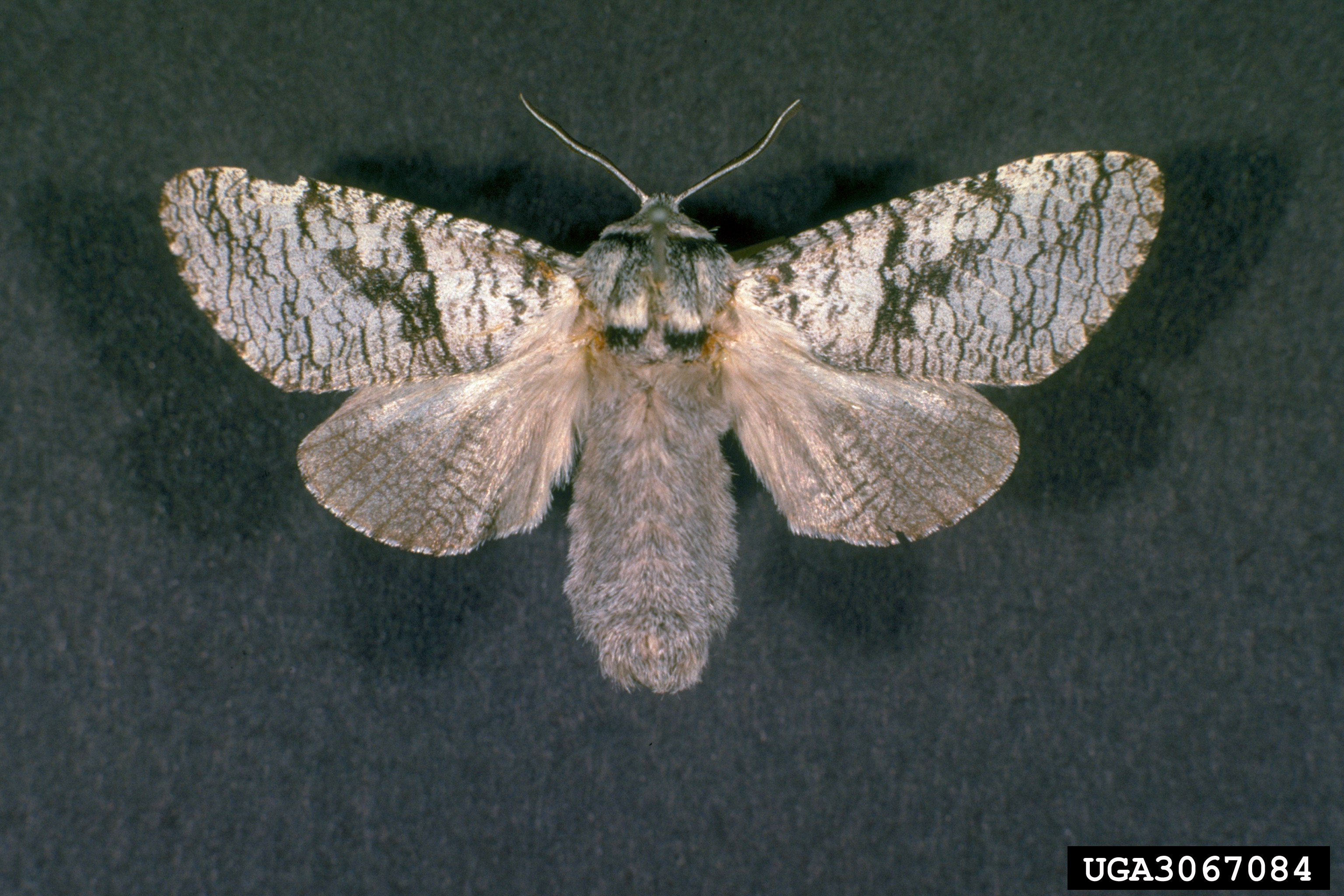
- Acossus populi

Scientific classification
- Kingdom: Animalia
- Phylum: Arthropoda
- Class: Insecta
- Order: Lepidoptera
- Family: Cossidae
- Subfamily: Cossinae
- Genus: Acossus; Dyar, 1905

Species
- See text

Synonyms
- Lamellocossus Daniel, 1956

= Acossus =

Genus of moths

Acossus is a genus of moths belonging to the family Cossidae.

== Species ==
- Acossus centerensis (Lintner, 1877) – poplar carpenterworm moth
- Acossus populi (Walker, 1856) – aspen carpenterworm moth
- Acossus terebra (Denis & Schiffermüller, 1775)
- Acossus undosus (Lintner, 1878)
- Acossus viktor (Yakovlev, 2004)
