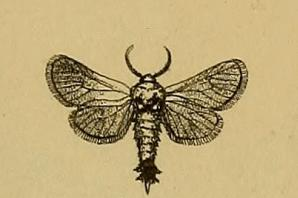
- Stygoides tricolor

Scientific classification
- Kingdom: Animalia
- Phylum: Arthropoda
- Clade: Pancrustacea
- Class: Insecta
- Order: Lepidoptera
- Family: Cossidae
- Subfamily: Cossinae
- Genus: Stygioides; Bruand, 1853

Synonyms
- Stygiella Bruand, 1853; Bruandia Desmarest, 1857; Psychidostygia Daniel, 1955; Danielostygia Reisser, 1962

= Stygioides =

Genus of moths

Stygioides is a genus of moths in the family Cossidae.

== Species ==
- Stygioides aethiops (Staudinger, 1887)
- Stygioides colchica (Herrich-Schäffer, 1851)
- Stygioides hecate Japaridze et Junnilainen, 2026
- Stygioides ivinskisi Saldaitis et Yakovlev in Saldaitis, Yakovlev et Ivinskis, 2007
- Stygioides nupponenorum Yakovlev et Saldaitis, 2011
- Stygioides persephone (Reisser, 1962)
- Stygioides psyche (Grum-Grshimailo, 1893)

== Former species ==
- Stygioides tricolor
