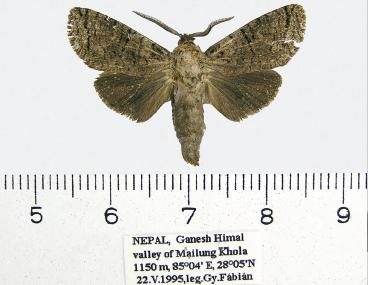
- Patoptoformis ganesha

Scientific classification
- Kingdom: Animalia
- Phylum: Arthropoda
- Clade: Pancrustacea
- Class: Insecta
- Order: Lepidoptera
- Family: Cossidae
- Subfamily: Cossinae
- Genus: Patoptoformis; Yakovlev, 2006

Species
- See text

= Patoptoformis =

Genus of moths

Patoptoformis is a genus of moths belonging to the family Cossidae.

== Description ==
The genus consists of small dark colored moths with dark hair densely covering the body. The antennae are bipectinate. Forewing with a scarcely seen streaky pattern; hindwing dark without pattern; fringe evenly dark on both wings. Sexual dimorphism weakly expressed but female somewhat larger than male with wider wings and non-pectinate antennae.

== Distribution ==
The genus is known from Nepal, Northeast India (Assam), Laos, and southwestern China (Sichuan).

== Species ==
There are four recognized species:

- Patoptoformis ganesha (Yakovlev, 2004)
- Patoptoformis hanuman Yakovlev, 2006
- Patoptoformis poltavskyi Yakovlev, 2020
- Patoptoformis rimsaitae Saldaitis & Yakovlev, 2012
