= Dieida =

Scientific classification
- Domain: Eukaryota
- Kingdom: Animalia
- Phylum: Arthropoda
- Class: Insecta
- Order: Lepidoptera
- Family: Cossidae
- Subfamily: Cossinae
- Genus: Dieida; Strand, 1911

Synonyms
- Dicida Seitz, 1912

Genus of moths

Dieida is a genus of moths of the family Cossidae. The genus was erected by Embrik Strand in 1911.

== Species ==
- Dieida ahngeri (Grum-Grshimailo, 1902)
- Dieida judith Yakovlev, 2008
- Dieida ledereri (Staudinger, 1871)
