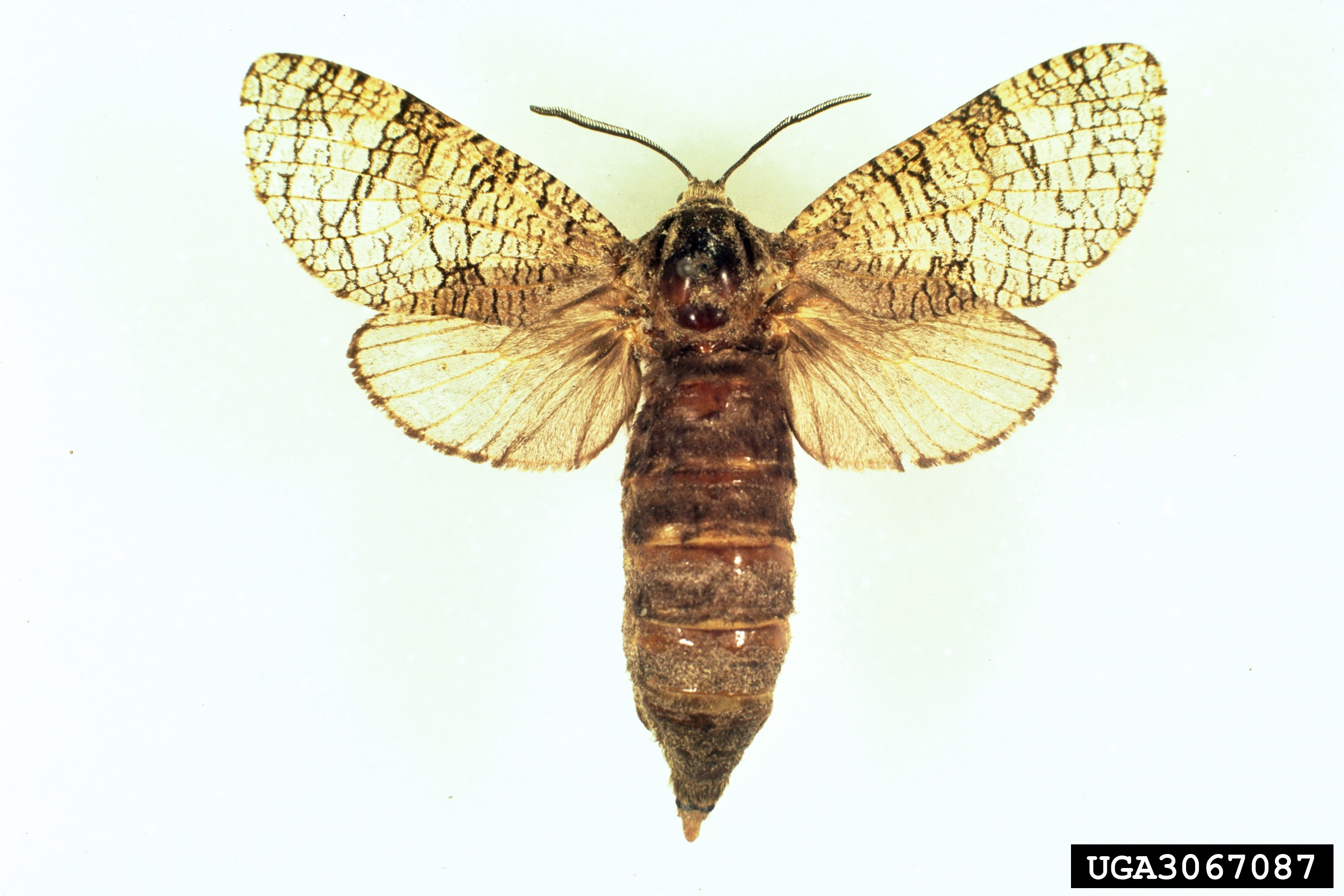
- Prionoxystus macmurtrei

Scientific classification
- Kingdom: Animalia
- Phylum: Arthropoda
- Class: Insecta
- Order: Lepidoptera
- Family: Cossidae
- Subfamily: Cossinae
- Tribe: incertae sedis
- Genus: Prionoxystus; Grote, 1882

Synonyms
- Xystus Grote, 1974

= Prionoxystus =

Genus of moths

Prionoxystus is a genus of moths in the family Cossidae.

== Species ==
- Prionoxystus macmurtrei Guérin-Meneville, 1829
- Prionoxystus piger Grote, 1865
- Prionoxystus robiniae Peck, 1818
