= Eogystia =

Scientific classification
- Kingdom: Animalia
- Phylum: Arthropoda
- Clade: Pancrustacea
- Class: Insecta
- Order: Lepidoptera
- Family: Cossidae
- Subfamily: Cossinae
- Genus: Eogystia; Schoorl, 1990

Genus of moths

Eogystia is a genus of moths in the family Cossidae.

== Species ==
- Eogystia hippophaecolus (Hua, Chou, Fang & Chen, 1990)
- Eogystia kaszabi (Daniel, 1965)
- Eogystia sibirica (Alphéraky, 1895)

== Etymology ==
The genus name is derived from Greek eos (meaning eastern) and gystia, an anagram of the genus name Stygia.
