= Dervishiya =

Scientific classification
- Kingdom: Animalia
- Phylum: Arthropoda
- Clade: Pancrustacea
- Class: Insecta
- Order: Lepidoptera
- Family: Cossidae
- Subfamily: Cossinae
- Genus: Dervishiya; Yakovlev, 2006

Genus of moths

Dervishiya is a genus of moths in the family Cossidae.

== Species ==
- Dervishiya cadambae (Moore, 1865)
- Dervishiya vartianae Yakovlev, 2011
