= Trigena parilis =

Scientific classification
- Kingdom: Animalia
- Phylum: Arthropoda
- Class: Insecta
- Order: Lepidoptera
- Family: Cossidae
- Genus: Trigena
- Species: T. parilis

Binomial name
- Trigena parilis (Schaus, 1892)

Synonyms
- Cossus parilis Schaus, 1892

Species of moth

Trigena parilis is a moth in the family Cossidae. It was described by Schaus in 1892. It is found in Brazil.
