= Brachygystia =

Scientific classification
- Kingdom: Animalia
- Phylum: Arthropoda
- Clade: Pancrustacea
- Class: Insecta
- Order: Lepidoptera
- Family: Cossidae
- Subfamily: Cossinae
- Genus: Brachygystia; Schoorl, 1990
- Species: B. mauretanicus

Binomial name
- Brachygystia mauretanicus (D. Lucas, 1907)

Synonyms
- Cossus mauretanicus D. Lucas, 1907; Catopta minor Rungs, 1972; Holcocerus powelli Oberthür, 1911

Genus of moths

Brachygystia is a monotypic moth genus in the family Cossidae. Its sole species, Brachygystia mauretanicus, is found in Tunisia, Morocco, Algeria and Mauritania.
