= Stygioides aethiops =

Scientific classification
- Domain: Eukaryota
- Kingdom: Animalia
- Phylum: Arthropoda
- Class: Insecta
- Order: Lepidoptera
- Family: Cossidae
- Genus: Stygioides
- Species: S. aethiops

Binomial name
- Stygioides aethiops (Staudinger, 1887)

Synonyms
- Stygia aethiops Staudinger, 1887

Species of moth

Stygioides aethiops is a species of moth of the family Cossidae. It is found in Uzbekistan.
