= Catopta dusii =

Scientific classification
- Kingdom: Animalia
- Phylum: Arthropoda
- Clade: Pancrustacea
- Class: Insecta
- Order: Lepidoptera
- Family: Cossidae
- Genus: Catopta
- Species: C. dusii

Binomial name
- Catopta dusii Yakovlev, Saldaitis, Kons & Borth, 2013

Species of moth

Catopta dusii is a moth in the family Cossidae. It was described by Yakovlev, Saldaitis, Kons and Borth in 2013. It is found in China (Sichuan), where it has been recorded at altitudes ranging from 1,150 to 3,000 meters. The habitat consists of mountainous areas.

The wingspan is 47–50 mm for males and 39 mm for females. The ground colour of the forewings is dark-grey with a lighter pattern in the discal and postdiscal areas. The hindwings are uniform dark-grey with light-grey marginal border. Adults have been recorded on wing from mid-July to early August.

== Etymology ==
The species is named for Professor Stefano Dusi.
