= Trigena crassa =

Scientific classification
- Kingdom: Animalia
- Phylum: Arthropoda
- Class: Insecta
- Order: Lepidoptera
- Family: Cossidae
- Genus: Trigena
- Species: T. crassa

Binomial name
- Trigena crassa Schaus, 1911

Species of moth

Trigena crassa is a moth in the family Cossidae. It was described by Schaus in 1911. It is found in Costa Rica.
