= Catopta danieli =

Scientific classification
- Kingdom: Animalia
- Phylum: Arthropoda
- Clade: Pancrustacea
- Class: Insecta
- Order: Lepidoptera
- Family: Cossidae
- Genus: Catopta
- Species: C. danieli

Binomial name
- Catopta danieli (Clench, 1958)

Synonyms
- Sinicossus danieli Clench, 1958

Species of moth

Catopta danieli is a moth in the family Cossidae. It was described by Harry Kendon Clench in 1958. It is found in Sichuan, China.
