= Catopta perunovi =

Scientific classification
- Kingdom: Animalia
- Phylum: Arthropoda
- Clade: Pancrustacea
- Class: Insecta
- Order: Lepidoptera
- Family: Cossidae
- Genus: Catopta
- Species: C. perunovi

Binomial name
- Catopta perunovi Yakovlev, 2007

Species of moth

Catopta perunovi is a moth in the family Cossidae. It was described by Yakovlev in 2007. It is found in the Altai Mountains, the Sayan Mountains, north-western Mongolia and central Yakutia.

The length of the forewings is 16–18 mm. The forewings are grey with a white spot in the discal area. The hindwings have a 'coffee with milk' colour.
