= Chiangmaiana qinlingensis =

Scientific classification
- Kingdom: Animalia
- Phylum: Arthropoda
- Clade: Pancrustacea
- Class: Insecta
- Order: Lepidoptera
- Family: Cossidae
- Genus: Chiangmaiana
- Species: C. qinlingensis

Binomial name
- Chiangmaiana qinlingensis (Hua, Chou, Fang & Chen, 1990)

Synonyms
- Sinicossus qinlingensis Hua, Chou, Fang & Chen, 1990

Species of moth

Chiangmaiana qinlingensis is a moth in the family Cossidae. It is found in China (Shaanxi).
