= Catopta rocharva =

Scientific classification
- Kingdom: Animalia
- Phylum: Arthropoda
- Clade: Pancrustacea
- Class: Insecta
- Order: Lepidoptera
- Family: Cossidae
- Genus: Catopta
- Species: C. rocharva

Binomial name
- Catopta rocharva Sheljuzhko, 1943

Species of moth

Catopta rocharva is a moth in the family Cossidae. It was described by Leo Sheljuzhko in 1943. It is found in Tajikistan (Gissar, western Pamir) and north-eastern Afghanistan.
