= Isoceras kruegeri =

Scientific classification
- Kingdom: Animalia
- Phylum: Arthropoda
- Class: Insecta
- Order: Lepidoptera
- Family: Cossidae
- Genus: Isoceras
- Species: I. kruegeri

Binomial name
- Isoceras kruegeri Turati, 1924

Synonyms
- Isoceras kruegeri ab. silvicola Krüger, 1934

Species of moth

Isoceras kruegeri is a moth in the family Cossidae. It is described by Turati in 1924, and it is found in Libya.
