= Catopta saldaitisi =

Scientific classification
- Kingdom: Animalia
- Phylum: Arthropoda
- Clade: Pancrustacea
- Class: Insecta
- Order: Lepidoptera
- Family: Cossidae
- Genus: Catopta
- Species: C. saldaitisi

Binomial name
- Catopta saldaitisi Yakovlev, 2007

Species of moth

Catopta saldaitisi is a moth in the family Cossidae. It was described by Yakovlev in 2007. It is found in Gobi-Altai and the southern part of the Mongolian Altai Mountains.

The length of the forewings is 16–18 mm.
