= Sundacossus gauguini =

Scientific classification
- Kingdom: Animalia
- Phylum: Arthropoda
- Clade: Pancrustacea
- Class: Insecta
- Order: Lepidoptera
- Family: Cossidae
- Genus: Sundacossus
- Species: S. gauguini

Binomial name
- Sundacossus gauguini Yakovlev, 2008

Species of moth

Sundacossus gauguini is a moth in the family Cossidae. It is found on Sumba in Indonesia.
