= Butterworm =

- A butterworm beside a Canadian penny

Scientific classification
- Domain: Eukaryota
- Kingdom: Animalia
- Phylum: Arthropoda
- Class: Insecta
- Order: Lepidoptera
- Family: Cossidae
- Genus: Chilecomadia
- Species: C. moorei

Binomial name
- Chilecomadia moorei (Silva Figueroa, 1915)

Synonyms
- Langsdorfia moorei Silva Figueroa, 1915; Chilecomadia zeuzerina Bryk, 1945

Genus of moths

The Chilean moth (Chilecomadia moorei) is a moth of the family Cossidae. The butterworm is the larval form and is commonly used as fishing bait in South America.

Butterworms, like mealworms, are used as food for insectivore pets, such as geckos and other reptiles, as their scent and bright color help attract the more stubborn eaters. They are also called tebo worms or trevo worms, and are high in fat and calcium. They are difficult to breed in captivity, and most are imported directly from Chile. They are usually irradiated to kill bacteria and prevent pupation as the moth is an invasive species.
