= Pygmeocossus =

Scientific classification
- Kingdom: Animalia
- Phylum: Arthropoda
- Clade: Pancrustacea
- Class: Insecta
- Order: Lepidoptera
- Family: Cossidae
- Genus: Pygmeocossus; Yakovlev, 2005

Genus of moths

Pygmeocossus is a genus of moths in the family Cossidae.

== Species ==
- Pygmeocossus simao Yakovlev, 2009
- Pygmeocossus tonga Yakovlev, 2005
