= Semitocossus =

Scientific classification
- Kingdom: Animalia
- Phylum: Arthropoda
- Clade: Pancrustacea
- Class: Insecta
- Order: Lepidoptera
- Family: Cossidae
- Subfamily: Cossinae
- Genus: Semitocossus; Yakovlev, 2007
- Species: S. johannes

Binomial name
- Semitocossus johannes (Staudinger, 1899)

Synonyms
- Paropta johannes Staudinger, 1899; Cossus striolatus Rothschild, 1912

Species of moth

Semitocossus johannes is a species of moth of the family Cossidae. It is found in Israel, Jordan, south-western Turkey and Saudi Arabia.

Adults are on wing from in April, August and October in Israel.

The larvae have been recorded feeding on Calotropis procera.
