= Citharalia =

Scientific classification
- Kingdom: Animalia
- Phylum: Arthropoda
- Clade: Pancrustacea
- Class: Insecta
- Order: Lepidoptera
- Family: Cossidae
- Genus: Citharalia; Clench, 1957
- Species: C. idiosetoides

Binomial name
- Citharalia idiosetoides Clench, 1957

Monotypic moth genus in family Cossidae

Citharalia is a monotypic moth genus in the family Cossidae described by Harry Kendon Clench in 1957. Its only species, Citharalia idiosetoides, was also described by the same author in the same year and is found in Bolivia.

== Taxonomy ==
Research that suggests Citharalia does not fit in the Cossidae, and should be excluded from this family. The genus should perhaps be included in the Cossulinae.
