= Eogystia kaszabi =

Scientific classification
- Domain: Eukaryota
- Kingdom: Animalia
- Phylum: Arthropoda
- Class: Insecta
- Order: Lepidoptera
- Family: Cossidae
- Genus: Eogystia
- Species: E. kaszabi

Binomial name
- Eogystia kaszabi (Daniel, 1965)

Synonyms
- Isoceras kaszabi Daniel, 1965

Species of moth

Eogystia kaszabi is a moth in the family Cossidae. It was described by Franz Daniel in 1965. It is found in China and Mongolia.
