= Chingizid (moth) =

Scientific classification
- Kingdom: Animalia
- Phylum: Arthropoda
- Clade: Pancrustacea
- Class: Insecta
- Order: Lepidoptera
- Family: Cossidae
- Subfamily: Cossinae
- Tribe: Cossini
- Genus: Chingizid; Yakovlev, 2011

Genus of moths

Chingizid is a genus of moths belonging to the family Cossidae, found in Mongolia. The genus was described by Yakovlev in 2011.

== Species ==
- Chingizid gobiana (Daniel, 1970)
- Chingizid kosachevi Yakovlev, 2012
- Chingizid transaltaica (Daniel, 1970)
