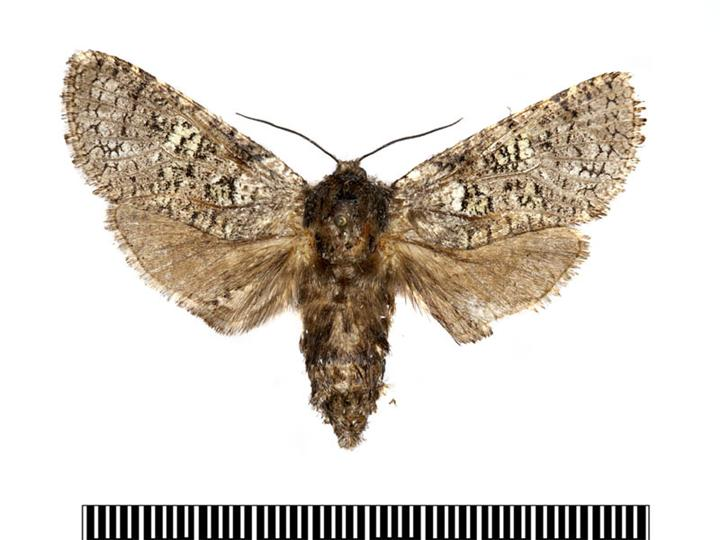
- Chilecomadia.valdiviana

Scientific classification
- Domain: Eukaryota
- Kingdom: Animalia
- Phylum: Arthropoda
- Class: Insecta
- Order: Lepidoptera
- Family: Cossidae
- Subfamily: Chilecomadiinae
- Genus: Chilecomadia; Dyar, 1940

Synonyms
- Diarthrosia Bryk, 1945; Allocossus Bryk, 1945

= Chilecomadia =

Moth genus in family Cossidae

Chilecomadia is a genus of moths in the family Cossidae.

== Species ==
- Chilecomadia moorei Silva Figuero, 1915 – Chilean moth
- Chilecomadia valdiviana Philippi, 1860
- Chilecomadia zeuzerina Bryk, 1945
