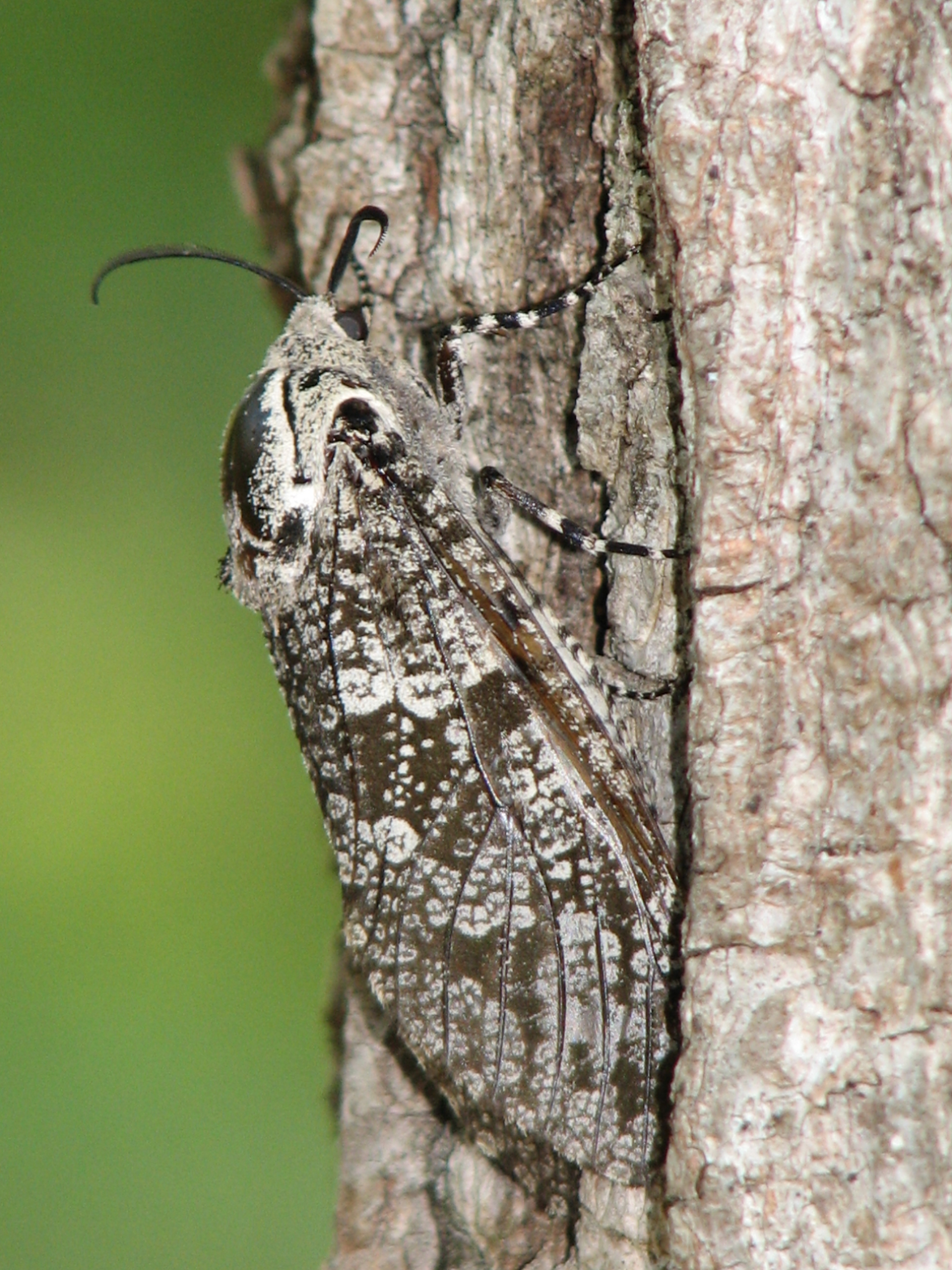

Scientific classification
- Kingdom: Animalia
- Phylum: Arthropoda
- Class: Insecta
- Order: Lepidoptera
- Family: Cossidae
- Genus: Prionoxystus
- Species: P. robiniae

Binomial name
- Prionoxystus robiniae (Peck, 1818)

Synonyms
- Cossus robiniae Peck, 1818; Xystus robiniae; Cossus crepera Harris, 1834; Cossus plagiatus Walker, 1856; Xyleutes querciperda Packard, 1864; Xyleutes crepera Packard, 1864; Cossus reticulatus Lintner, 1878; Prionoxystus quercus Ehrmann, 1893; Cossus zabolicus Strecker, 1898; Prionxystus robinae Barnes & McDunnough, 1911; Prionoxystus mixtus Barnes & Benjamin, 1923; Prionoxystus subnigrus Barnes & Benjamin, 1923; Prionoxystus flavotinctus Barnes & Benjamin, 1923

= Prionoxystus robiniae =

Species of moth

Prionoxystus robiniae, the carpenterworm moth or locust borer, is a moth of the family Cossidae. It was first described by Peck in 1818 and it is found in southern Canada and most of the United States.

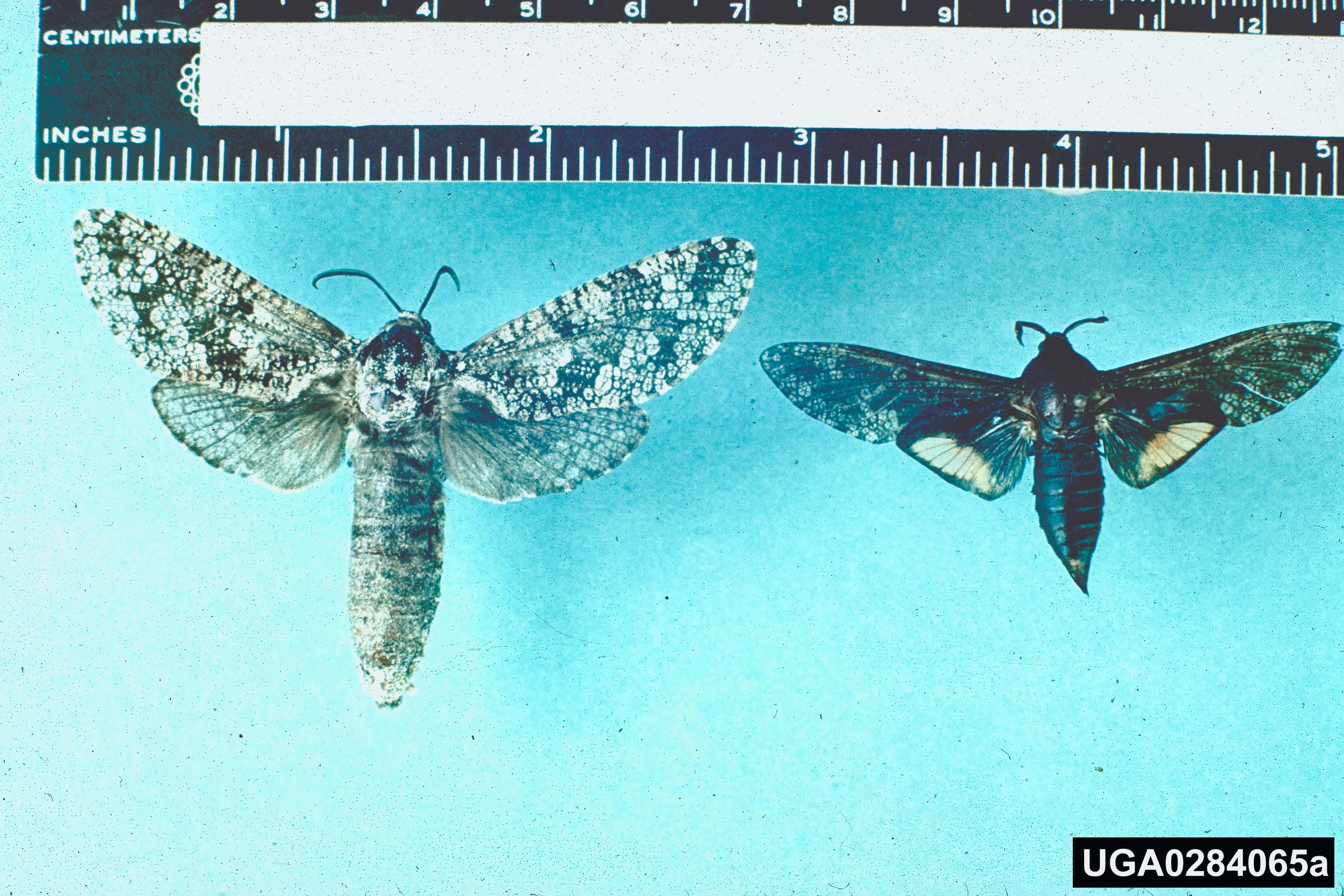
Female (left) and male (right)

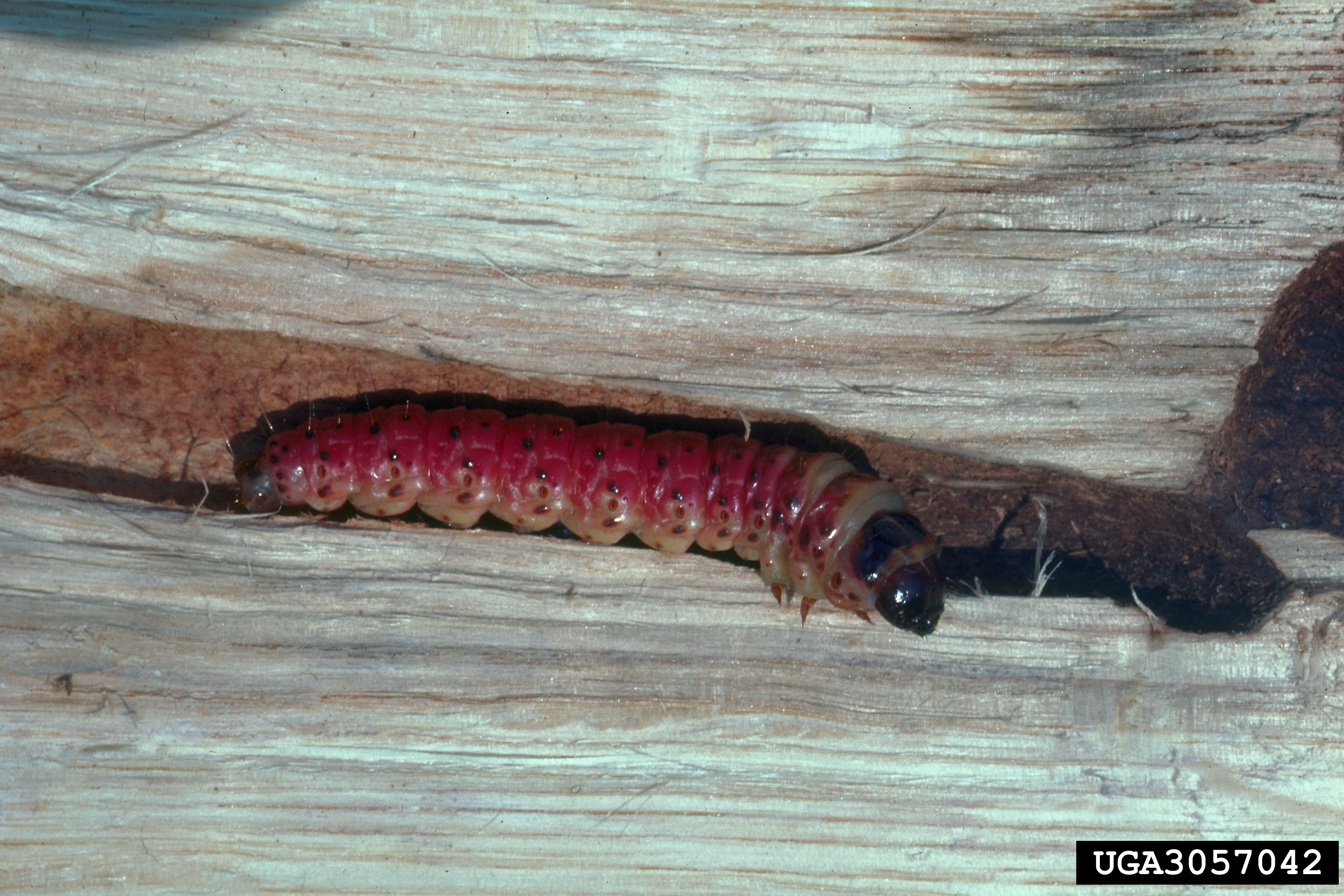
Caterpillar

The wingspan is 43–85 mm (1.7–3.3 in). Adults are on wing from May to July depending on the location.

The larvae feed on locust, oak, chestnut, poplar, willow, maple and ash. The species is considered a pest, because the tunnels the larvae create decrease the value of hardwood lumber.
