= Mahommedella =

Scientific classification
- Kingdom: Animalia
- Phylum: Arthropoda
- Clade: Pancrustacea
- Class: Insecta
- Order: Lepidoptera
- Family: Cossidae
- Subfamily: Cossinae
- Genus: Mahommedella; Yakovlev, 2011
- Species: M. rungsi

Binomial name
- Mahommedella rungsi (Daniel et Witt, 1974)

Synonyms
- Catopta rungsi Daniel et Witt, 1974; Holcocerus rungsi

Genus of moths

Mahommedella is a genus of moths in the family Cossidae. It contains only one species, Mahommedella rungsi, which is found in Morocco.
