= Catopta =

Scientific classification
- Domain: Eukaryota
- Kingdom: Animalia
- Phylum: Arthropoda
- Class: Insecta
- Order: Lepidoptera
- Family: Cossidae
- Subfamily: Cossulinae
- Genus: Catopta; Staudinger, 1899

Synonyms
- Newelskoia Grum-Grshimailo, 1900; Sinicossus Clench, 1958; Catopa Bryk, 1947

Genus of moths

Catopta is a genus of moths in the family Cossidae.

== Species ==
- Catopta albimacula Staudinger, 1899
- Catopta albonubilus Graeser, 1888
- Catopta albothoracis B.Z. Hua, I. Chou, D. Fang & S. Chen, 1990
- Catopta birmanopta Bryk, 1950
- Catopta cashmirensis (Moore, 1879)
- Catopta danieli (Clench, 1958)
- Catopta dusii Yakovlev, Saldaitis, Kons & Borth, 2013
- Catopta eberti Daniel, 1964
- Catopta griseotincta Daniel, 1940
- Catopta grumi R.V. Yakovlev, 2009
- Catopta hyrcanus (Christoph, 1888)
- Catopta kansuensis Bryk, 1942
- Catopta kendevanensis Daniel, 1937
- Catopta perunovi Yakovlev, 2007
- Catopta rocharva Sheljuzhko, 1943
- Catopta saldaitisi Yakovlev, 2007
- Catopta sikkimensis (Arora, 1965)
- Catopta tropicalis Yakovlev & Witt, 2009

== Former species ==
- Catopta rungsi Daniel & Witt, 1975
