= Assegaj =

Scientific classification
- Kingdom: Animalia
- Phylum: Arthropoda
- Clade: Pancrustacea
- Class: Insecta
- Order: Lepidoptera
- Family: Cossidae
- Subfamily: Cossinae
- Genus: Assegaj; Yakovlev, 2006
- Species: A. clenchi

Binomial name
- Assegaj clenchi Yakovlev, 2006

Genus of moths

Assegaj is a monotypic genus of moths in the family Cossidae. Its sole species is Assegaj clenchi, which is found in Cameroon, the Republic of Congo and Nigeria.

The length of the forewings is 21–23 mm.

== Etymology ==
The genus name is derived from assegai, an African spear with a wide tip, and refers to the peculiar structure of the uncus. The species is named in honour of H. K. Clench.
