= Dervishiya cadambae =

Scientific classification
- Kingdom: Animalia
- Phylum: Arthropoda
- Class: Insecta
- Order: Lepidoptera
- Family: Cossidae
- Genus: Dervishiya
- Species: D. cadambae

Binomial name
- Dervishiya cadambae (Moore, 1865)

Synonyms
- Cossus cadambae Moore, 1865; Alcterogystia cadambae

Species of moth

Dervishiya cadambae is a moth in the family Cossidae. It is found in India.

The larvae feed on Ficus species, Nauclea cadamba and Tectonia grandis.
