= Ludwig Carl Friedrich Graeser =

German entomologist (1840–1913)

Ludwig Carl Friedrich (Louis) Graeser (12 February 1840, in Dresden – 9 December 1913, in Hamburg) was a German entomologist who specialised in Palearctic Lepidoptera. He was a bookbinder.

His collections are in the Zoological Museum of the Zoological Institute of the Russian Academy of Sciences (Amur, Siberia) and Zoologisches Museum Hamburg (West Palearctic)

== Works ==
1888-9 Beiträge zur Kenntnis der Lepidopteren-Fauna des Amurlandes Berl. Ent. Zs. 32 (1): 33–153 (1888), (2): 309–414 (1889)
