= Chiangmaiana =

Scientific classification
- Kingdom: Animalia
- Phylum: Arthropoda
- Class: Insecta
- Order: Lepidoptera
- Family: Cossidae
- Subfamily: Catoptinae
- Genus: Chiangmaiana; Kemal & Koçak, 2006

Synonyms
- Nirvana Yakovlev, 2004; Nirrvanna Yakovlev, 2007

Moth genus in family Cossidae

Chiangmaiana is a genus of the family Cossidae (carpenter or goat moths).

== Genus ==
- Chiangmaiana Kemal & Koçak, 2005 objective replacement name [pro Nirvana Yakovlev, 2004 nom. invalid.(preoc.name)] Cesa, Miscellaneous papers, 91/92: 12. [misdating as: "Kemal & Koçak, 2007" (Yakovlev & Saldaitis, 2007: 12 ) Eversmannia, 11-12: 12; misdating as: "Kemal & Koçak, 2006" (Yakovlev, 2009: 1207, 1211.) Zoologicheskii Zhurnal, 88 (10): 1207, 1211.] ( ≡ Nirvana Yakovlev, 2004 nom. invalid.(preoc.name) non Stål, 1859 nec Kirkaldy, 1900 nec Tsukuda & Nishiyama, 1979);( ≡ Nirrvanna Yakovlev, 2007 nom. invalid.( junior object. syn.), objective replacement name (mistaken repl.n.) ) is a genus of moths in the family Cossidae.

== Species ==
- Chiangmaiana buddhi (Yakovlev, 2004)
- Chiangmaiana qinlingensis (Hua, Chou, Fang & Chen, 1990)
