= Alcterogystia frater =

Scientific classification
- Kingdom: Animalia
- Phylum: Arthropoda
- Class: Insecta
- Order: Lepidoptera
- Family: Cossidae
- Genus: Alcterogystia
- Species: A. frater

Binomial name
- Alcterogystia frater (Warnecke, 1929)

Synonyms
- Cossus frater Warnecke, 1929; Paropta frater

Species of moth

Alcterogystia frater is a moth in the family Cossidae. It is found in Yemen and Saudi Arabia.
