= Camellocossus henleyi =

Scientific classification
- Kingdom: Animalia
- Phylum: Arthropoda
- Class: Insecta
- Order: Lepidoptera
- Family: Cossidae
- Genus: Camellocossus
- Species: C. henleyi

Binomial name
- Camellocossus henleyi (Warren & Rothschild, 1905)

Synonyms
- Cossus henleyi Warren & Rothschild, 1905; Cossus niloticus de Joannis, 1909; Paropta pharaonis Bang-Haas, 1910

Species of moth

Camellocossus henleyi is a moth in the family Cossidae. It is found in Algeria, Morocco, Egypt, Ethiopia, Mauritania, Sudan and possibly Namibia.

The larvae feed on Acacia nilotica and Acacia raddiana.
