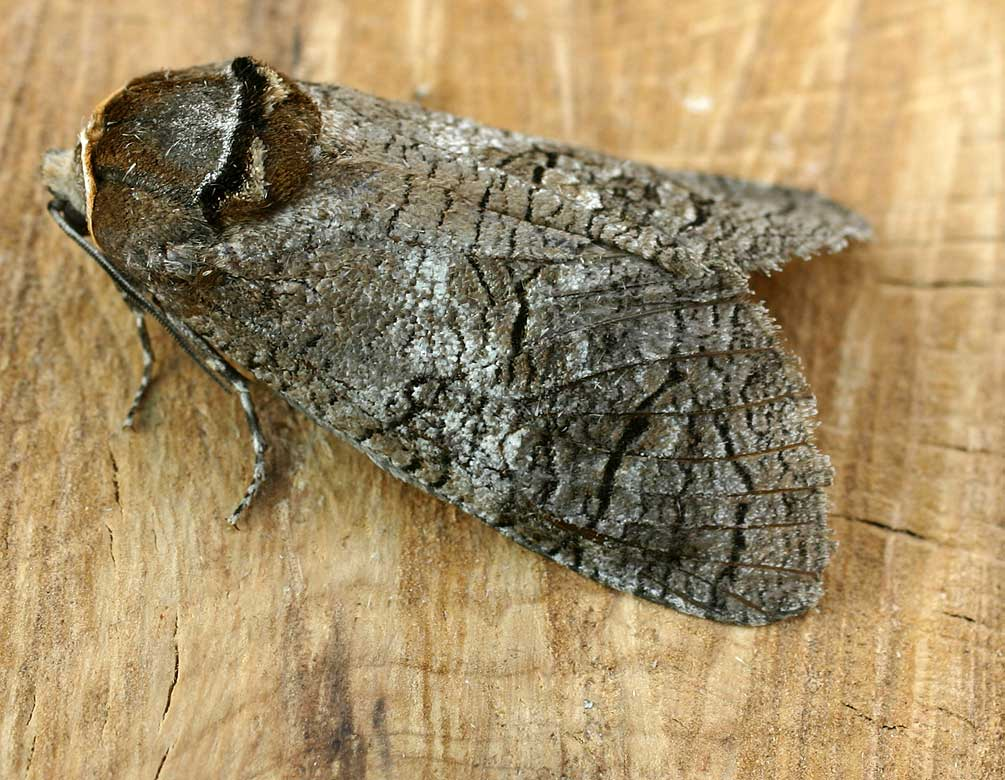
- Cossus cossus

Scientific classification
- Domain: Eukaryota
- Kingdom: Animalia
- Phylum: Arthropoda
- Class: Insecta
- Order: Lepidoptera
- Family: Cossidae
- Genus: Cossus; Fabricius, 1793

Synonyms
- Teredo Hübner, 1806; Lyonetus Rafinesque, 1815; Trypanus Rambur, 1866; Caseus Castelnau, 1840; Cassus Dyar, 1905; Cussus Milyanovsky, 1964

= Cossus =

Genus of moths

Cossus is a genus of moths in the family Cossidae described by Johan Christian Fabricius in 1793.

== Species ==
- Cossus afghanistana Daniel, 1953
- Cossus bohatschi Püngeler, 1898
- Cossus cossus Linnaeus, 1758
- Cossus crassicornis Fabricius, 1775
- Cossus dentilinea Druce, 1911
- Cossus hoenei Yakovlev, 2006
- Cossus horrifer Schaus, 1892
- Cossus inconspicuus Druce, 1910
- Cossus kerzhneri Yakovlev, 2011
- Cossus nina Schaus, 1911
- Cossus orientalis Gaede, 1929
- Cossus shmakovi Yakovlev, 2004
- Cossus siniaevi Yakovlev, 2004
- Cossus subocellatus Walker, 1856
- Cossus tibetanus Hua, Chou, Fang & Chen, 1990
- Cossus ziliante Stoll, 1782

== Former species ==
- Cossus abyssinicus Hampson, 1910
- Cossus acronyctoides Moore, 1879
- Cossus aegyptiacus Hampson, 1910
- Cossus airani Daniel, 1937
- Cossus aksuensis Daniel, 1953
- Cossus araraticus Teich, 1896
- Cossus aries Püngeler, 1902
- Cossus badiala D. S. Fletcher, 1968
- Cossus balcanicus Lederer, 1863
- Cossus bianchii Krüger, 1934
- Cossus bongiovannii Krüger, 1939
- Cossus breviculus Mabille, 1880
- Cossus brunneofasciatus Gaede, 1929
- Cossus cadambae Moore, 1865
- Cossus cashmirensis Moore, 1879
- Cossus celebensis Roepke, 1957
- Cossus centerensis Lintner, 1877
- Cossus centrimaculatus Röber, 1925
- Cossus cheesmani Tams, 1925
- Cossus chloratus Swinhoe, 1892
- Cossus cinereus Roepke, 1957
- Cossus cirrilator Le Cerf, 1919
- Cossus colossus Staudinger, 1887
- Cossus crassilineatus Gaede, 1929
- Cossus crucis Kenrick, 1914
- Cossus divisus Rothschild, 1912
- Cossus eutelia Clench, 1959
- Cossus fanti Hampson, 1910
- Cossus frater Warnecke, 1929
- Cossus fulvosparsa Butler, 1882
- Cossus funkei Röber, 1896
- Cossus fuscibasis Hampson, 1895
- Cossus gaerdesi Daniel, 1956
- Cossus giganteus Schwingenschuss, 1938
- Cossus greeni Arora, 1976
- Cossus hunanensis Daniel, 1940
- Cossus hycranus Christoph, 1888
- Cossus incandescens Butler, 1875
- Cossus javanus Roepke, 1957
- Cossus kinabaluensis Gaede, 1933
- Cossus kwouus Karsch, 1898
- Cossus lepta West, 1932
- Cossus likiangi Daniel, 1940
- Cossus mauretanicus D. Lucas, 1907
- Cossus modestus Staudinger, 1887
- Cossus mokshanensis Daniel, 1949
- Cossus mongolicus Erschoff, 1882
- Cossus mucidus Edwards, 1882
- Cossus nigeriae Bethune-Baker, 1915
- Cossus nigromaculatus Hampson, 1892
- Cossus osthelderi Daniel, 1933
- Cossus parvipunctatus Hampson, 1892
- Cossus parvulus Kenrick, 1914
- Cossus pavidus Butler, 1882
- Cossus perplexus Neumoegen, 1893
- Cossus polygraphus Lower, 1893
- Cossus populi Walker, 1865
- Cossus pusillus Roepke, 1957
- Cossus rectangulatus Wichgraf, 1921
- Cossus reussi Strand, 1913
- Cossus rufidorsia Hampson, 1905
- Cossus saharae D. Lucas, 1907
- Cossus sakalava Viette, 1958
- Cossus sareptensis Rothschild, 1912
- Cossus semicurvatus Gaede, 1929
- Cossus seineri Grünberg
- Cossus senex Butler, 1882
- Cossus sidamo Rougeot, 1977
- Cossus stertzi Püngeler, 1900
- Cossus stigmaticus Moore, 1879
- Cossus striolatus Rothschild, 1912
- Cossus subfuscus Snellen, 1895
- Cossus tahamae Wiltshire, 1949
- Cossus tahlai Dumont, 1932
- Cossus tapinus Püngeler, 1898
- Cossus terebroides Felder, 1874
- Cossus toluminus Druce, 1887
- Cossus turati Krüger, 1934
- Cossus unguiculatus Fabricius, 1793
- Cossus verbeeki Roepke, 1957
- Cossus vinctus Walker, 1865
- Cossus windhoekensis Strand, 1913

== Unknown status ==
- Cossus florita Druce
