= Arctiocossus =

Scientific classification
- Kingdom: Animalia
- Phylum: Arthropoda
- Class: Insecta
- Order: Lepidoptera
- Family: Cossidae
- Subfamily: Cossinae
- Genus: Arctiocossus; Felder, 1874

Synonyms
- Pecticossus Gaede, 1930; Pectiocossus

Genus of moths

Arctiocossus is a genus of moths in the family Cossidae.

== Species ==
- Arctiocossus antargyreus C. Felder & R. Felder, 1874
- Arctiocossus castaneus (Gaede, 1929)
- Arctiocossus danieli Clench, 1959
- Arctiocossus gaerdesi (Daniel, 1956)
- Arctiocossus impeditus (Walker, 1865)
- Arctiocossus ligatus (Walker, 1865)
- Arctiocossus poliopterus Clench, 1959
- Arctiocossus punctifera Gaede, 1929
- Arctiocossus strigulatus Gaede, 1929
- Arctiocossus tessellatus Clench, 1959

== Former species ==
- Arctiocossus aries Püngeler, 1902
