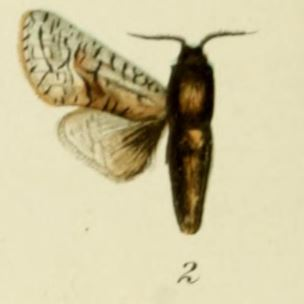
- Brachylia reussi

Scientific classification
- Domain: Eukaryota
- Kingdom: Animalia
- Phylum: Arthropoda
- Class: Insecta
- Order: Lepidoptera
- Family: Blastobasidae
- Tribe: Holcocerini
- Genus: Brachylia; Felder, 1874

= Brachylia =

Genus of moths

Brachylia is a genus of moths in the family Cossidae.

== Species ==
- Brachylia albida Yakovlev & Saldaitis, 2011
- Brachylia eberti Yakovlev, 2011
- Brachylia eutelia Clench, 1959
- Brachylia fon Yakovlev & Saldaitis, 2011
- Brachylia hercules Yakovlev, 2011
- Brachylia incanescens (Butler, 1875)
- Brachylia kwouus (Karsch, 1898)
- Brachylia murzini Yakovlev, 2011
- Brachylia nigeriae (Bethune-Baker, 1915)
- Brachylia nussi Yakovlev, 2011
- Brachylia rectangulata (Wichgraf, 1921)
- Brachylia reussi (Strand, 1913)
- Brachylia semicurvatus (Gaede, 1930)
- Brachylia senegalensis Yakovlev & Saldaitis, 2011
- Brachylia terebroides Felder, 1874
- Brachylia vukutu Yakovlev & Lenz, 2013
- Brachylia windhoekensis (Strand, 1913)

== Former species ==
- Brachylia acronyctoides
