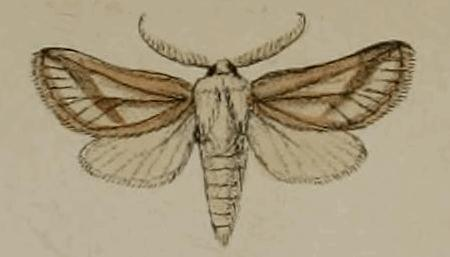

Scientific classification
- Domain: Eukaryota
- Kingdom: Animalia
- Phylum: Arthropoda
- Class: Insecta
- Order: Lepidoptera
- Family: Cossidae
- Genus: Eremocossus
- Species: E. foedus

Binomial name
- Eremocossus foedus (C. Swinhoe, 1899)

Synonyms
- Phragmatoecia foeda C. Swinhoe, 1899; Dyspessa foeda

= Eremocossus foedus =

Species of moth

Eremocossus foedus is a species of moth of the family Cossidae. It was described by Charles Swinhoe in 1899. It is found in Spain.

The wingspan is about 30 mm.

== Taxonomy ==
A former subspecies, Eremocossus foedus almeriana, from south-eastern Spain is now classified as the species Eremocossus almeriana.
