= R. celebensis =

R. celebensis may refer to:

- Rhinolophus celebensis, the Sulawesi horseshoe bat, a bat species
- Roepkiella celebensis, a moth species
- Rousettus celebensis, the Sulawesi rousette, a bat species
