= Aholcocerus =

Scientific classification
- Kingdom: Animalia
- Phylum: Arthropoda
- Clade: Pancrustacea
- Class: Insecta
- Order: Lepidoptera
- Family: Cossidae
- Subfamily: Cossinae
- Genus: Aholcocerus; Yakovlev, 2006

Genus of moths

Aholcocerus is a genus of moths in the family Cossidae.

== Species ==
- Aholcocerus ihleorum Yakovlev & Witt, 2009
- Aholcocerus ronkayorum Yakovlev, 2006
- Aholcocerus sevastopuloi Yakovlev, 2011
- Aholcocerus verbeeki (Roepke, 1957)
