= Gobibatyr ustyuzhanini =

Scientific classification
- Kingdom: Animalia
- Phylum: Arthropoda
- Clade: Pancrustacea
- Class: Insecta
- Order: Lepidoptera
- Family: Cossidae
- Genus: Gobibatyr
- Species: G. ustyuzhanini

Binomial name
- Gobibatyr ustyuzhanini Yakovlev, 2004

Species of moth

Gobibatyr ustyuzhanini is a moth in the family Cossidae. It was described by Yakovlev in 2004. It is found in Mongolia.
