= Chinocossus vjet =

Scientific classification
- Kingdom: Animalia
- Phylum: Arthropoda
- Clade: Pancrustacea
- Class: Insecta
- Order: Lepidoptera
- Family: Cossidae
- Genus: Chinocossus
- Species: C. vjet

Binomial name
- Chinocossus vjet Yakovlev, 2006

Species of moth

Chinocossus vjet is a moth in the family Cossidae. It was described by Yakovlev in 2006. It is found in Vietnam.

The length of the forewings is about 22 mm. The wing s are brown. The hindwings are brown with grey strokes between the veins.
