= Planctogystia lemur =

Planctogystia parvulus

Scientific classification
- Kingdom: Animalia
- Phylum: Arthropoda
- Clade: Pancrustacea
- Class: Insecta
- Order: Lepidoptera
- Family: Cossidae
- Genus: Planctogystia
- Species: P. lemur

Binomial name
- Planctogystia lemur Yakovlev, 2009

Species of moth

Planctogystia lemur is a moth of the family Cossidae. It is found in eastern Madagascar.

The holotype had been found in Ifanadiana in 1995.

== See also ==
- List of moths of Madagascar
