= Roepkiella artushka =

Scientific classification
- Kingdom: Animalia
- Phylum: Arthropoda
- Clade: Pancrustacea
- Class: Insecta
- Order: Lepidoptera
- Family: Cossidae
- Genus: Roepkiella
- Species: R. artushka

Binomial name
- Roepkiella artushka (Yakovlev, 2006)

Synonyms
- Paracossus artushka Yakovlev, 2006

Species of moth

Roepkiella artushka is a moth in the family Cossidae. It was described by Yakovlev in 2006. It is found in southern Thailand and Vietnam.

The length of the forewings is about 11 mm.
