= Roerichiora obliquifascia =

Scientific classification
- Kingdom: Animalia
- Phylum: Arthropoda
- Class: Insecta
- Order: Lepidoptera
- Family: Cossidae
- Genus: Roerichiora
- Species: R. obliquifascia

Binomial name
- Roerichiora obliquifascia (Bryk, 1950)

Synonyms
- Xyleutes obliquifascia Bryk, 1950

Species of moth

Roerichiora obliquifascia is a species of moth of the family Cossidae. It is found in Myanmar and India (Assam).
