= Chinocossus marcopoloi =

Scientific classification
- Kingdom: Animalia
- Phylum: Arthropoda
- Clade: Pancrustacea
- Class: Insecta
- Order: Lepidoptera
- Family: Cossidae
- Genus: Chinocossus
- Species: C. marcopoloi

Binomial name
- Chinocossus marcopoloi Yakovlev, 2006

Species of moth

Chinocossus marcopoloi is a moth in the family Cossidae. It was described by Yakovlev in 2006. It is found in China (Yunnan).

The length of the forewings is about 19 mm. The peripheral parts of the forewings are grey with a reticulate pattern. The discal area and basal part are brown. The hindwings are grey with grey strokes between the veins.

== Etymology ==
The species is named in honour of Marco Polo.
