= Eremocossus =

Scientific classification
- Kingdom: Animalia
- Phylum: Arthropoda
- Class: Insecta
- Order: Lepidoptera
- Family: Cossidae
- Subfamily: Cossinae
- Genus: Eremocossus; Hampson, 1893

Genus of moths

Eremocossus is a genus of moths in the family Cossidae first described by George Hampson in 1893.

== Species ==
- Eremocossus almeriana (de Freina & Witt, 1990)
- Eremocossus asema (Püngeler, 1899)
- Eremocossus foedus (Swinhoe, 1884)
- Eremocossus nubica Yakovlev, 2008
- Eremocossus vaulogeri (Staudinger, 1897)
