= Cossus nina =

Scientific classification
- Kingdom: Animalia
- Phylum: Arthropoda
- Class: Insecta
- Order: Lepidoptera
- Family: Cossidae
- Genus: Cossus
- Species: C. nina

Binomial name
- Cossus nina Schaus, 1911

Species of moth

Cossus nina is a moth in the family Cossidae. It is found in Costa Rica.
