= Cossus hoenei =

Scientific classification
- Kingdom: Animalia
- Phylum: Arthropoda
- Clade: Pancrustacea
- Class: Insecta
- Order: Lepidoptera
- Family: Cossidae
- Genus: Cossus
- Species: C. hoenei

Binomial name
- Cossus hoenei Yakovlev, 2006

Species of moth

Cossus hoenei is a moth in the family Cossidae. It is found in China (Shaanxi).

The length of the forewings is about 22 mm. The forewings are grey-brown with a wavy pattern and a small light-grey field in the discal area.

== Etymology ==
The species is named in honour of Dr H. Höne.
