= Afroarabiella tanzaniae =

Scientific classification
- Kingdom: Animalia
- Phylum: Arthropoda
- Clade: Pancrustacea
- Class: Insecta
- Order: Lepidoptera
- Family: Cossidae
- Genus: Afroarabiella
- Species: A. tanzaniae

Binomial name
- Afroarabiella tanzaniae Yakovlev, 2011

Species of moth

Afroarabiella tanzaniae is a moth in the family Cossidae. It is found in Tanzania.
