= Planctogystia legraini =

Scientific classification
- Kingdom: Animalia
- Phylum: Arthropoda
- Clade: Pancrustacea
- Class: Insecta
- Order: Lepidoptera
- Family: Cossidae
- Genus: Planctogystia
- Species: P. legraini

Binomial name
- Planctogystia legraini Yakovlev & Saldaitis, 2011

Species of moth

Planctogystia legraini is a moth in the family Cossidae. It is found in Madagascar.
