= Wittocossus dellabrunai =

Scientific classification
- Kingdom: Animalia
- Phylum: Arthropoda
- Clade: Pancrustacea
- Class: Insecta
- Order: Lepidoptera
- Family: Cossidae
- Genus: Wittocossus
- Species: W. dellabrunai

Binomial name
- Wittocossus dellabrunai Saldaitis et Ivinskis, 2010

Species of moth

Wittocossus dellabrunai is a moth in the family Cossidae. It is found in China (Shaanxi).
