= Cossus inconspicuus =

Scientific classification
- Kingdom: Animalia
- Phylum: Arthropoda
- Class: Insecta
- Order: Lepidoptera
- Family: Cossidae
- Genus: Cossus
- Species: C. inconspicuus

Binomial name
- Cossus inconspicuus (H. Druce, 1910)

Synonyms
- Brachylia inconspicua H. Druce, 1910; Cossus inconspicua

Species of moth

Cossus inconspicuus is a moth in the family Cossidae first described by Herbert Druce in 1910. It is found in Colombia.
