= Arctiocossus impeditus =

Scientific classification
- Kingdom: Animalia
- Phylum: Arthropoda
- Class: Insecta
- Order: Lepidoptera
- Family: Cossidae
- Genus: Arctiocossus
- Species: A. impeditus

Binomial name
- Arctiocossus impeditus (Walker, 1865)

Synonyms
- Cossus impeditus Walker, 1865

Species of moth

Arctiocossus impeditus is a moth in the family Cossidae. It is found in South Africa.
