= Mirocossus politzari =

Scientific classification
- Kingdom: Animalia
- Phylum: Arthropoda
- Clade: Pancrustacea
- Class: Insecta
- Order: Lepidoptera
- Family: Cossidae
- Genus: Mirocossus
- Species: M. politzari

Binomial name
- Mirocossus politzari Yakovlev, 2011

Species of moth

Mirocossus politzari is a moth in the family Cossidae. It was described by Yakovlev in 2011. It is found in Ivory Coast, Nigeria and Togo.
