= Cossus tibetanus =

Scientific classification
- Kingdom: Animalia
- Phylum: Arthropoda
- Clade: Pancrustacea
- Class: Insecta
- Order: Lepidoptera
- Family: Cossidae
- Genus: Cossus
- Species: C. tibetanus

Binomial name
- Cossus tibetanus Hua, Chou, Fang et Chen, 1990

Species of moth

Cossus tibetanus is a moth in the family Cossidae. It was described by Hua, Chou, Fang and Chen in 1990. It is found in China (Tibet).
