= Aholcocerus sevastopuloi =

Scientific classification
- Kingdom: Animalia
- Phylum: Arthropoda
- Clade: Pancrustacea
- Class: Insecta
- Order: Lepidoptera
- Family: Cossidae
- Genus: Aholcocerus
- Species: A. sevastopuloi

Binomial name
- Aholcocerus sevastopuloi Yakovlev, 2011

Species of moth

Aholcocerus sevastopuloi is a moth in the family Cossidae. It is found in India.
