= Roepkiella ingae =

Scientific classification
- Kingdom: Animalia
- Phylum: Arthropoda
- Clade: Pancrustacea
- Class: Insecta
- Order: Lepidoptera
- Family: Cossidae
- Genus: Roepkiella
- Species: R. ingae

Binomial name
- Roepkiella ingae Yakovlev, 2011

Species of moth

Roepkiella ingae is a moth in the family Cossidae. It is found in southern Thailand.
