= Afroarabiella politzari =

Scientific classification
- Kingdom: Animalia
- Phylum: Arthropoda
- Clade: Pancrustacea
- Class: Insecta
- Order: Lepidoptera
- Family: Cossidae
- Genus: Afroarabiella
- Species: A. politzari

Binomial name
- Afroarabiella politzari Yakovlev, 2008

Species of moth

Afroarabiella politzari is a moth in the family Cossidae. It is found in Kenya.
