= Cossus ziliante =

Scientific classification
- Kingdom: Animalia
- Phylum: Arthropoda
- Class: Insecta
- Order: Lepidoptera
- Family: Cossidae
- Genus: Cossus
- Species: C. ziliante

Binomial name
- Cossus ziliante (Stoll, 1782)

Synonyms
- Phalaena (Bombyx) ziliante Stoll, 1782

Species of moth

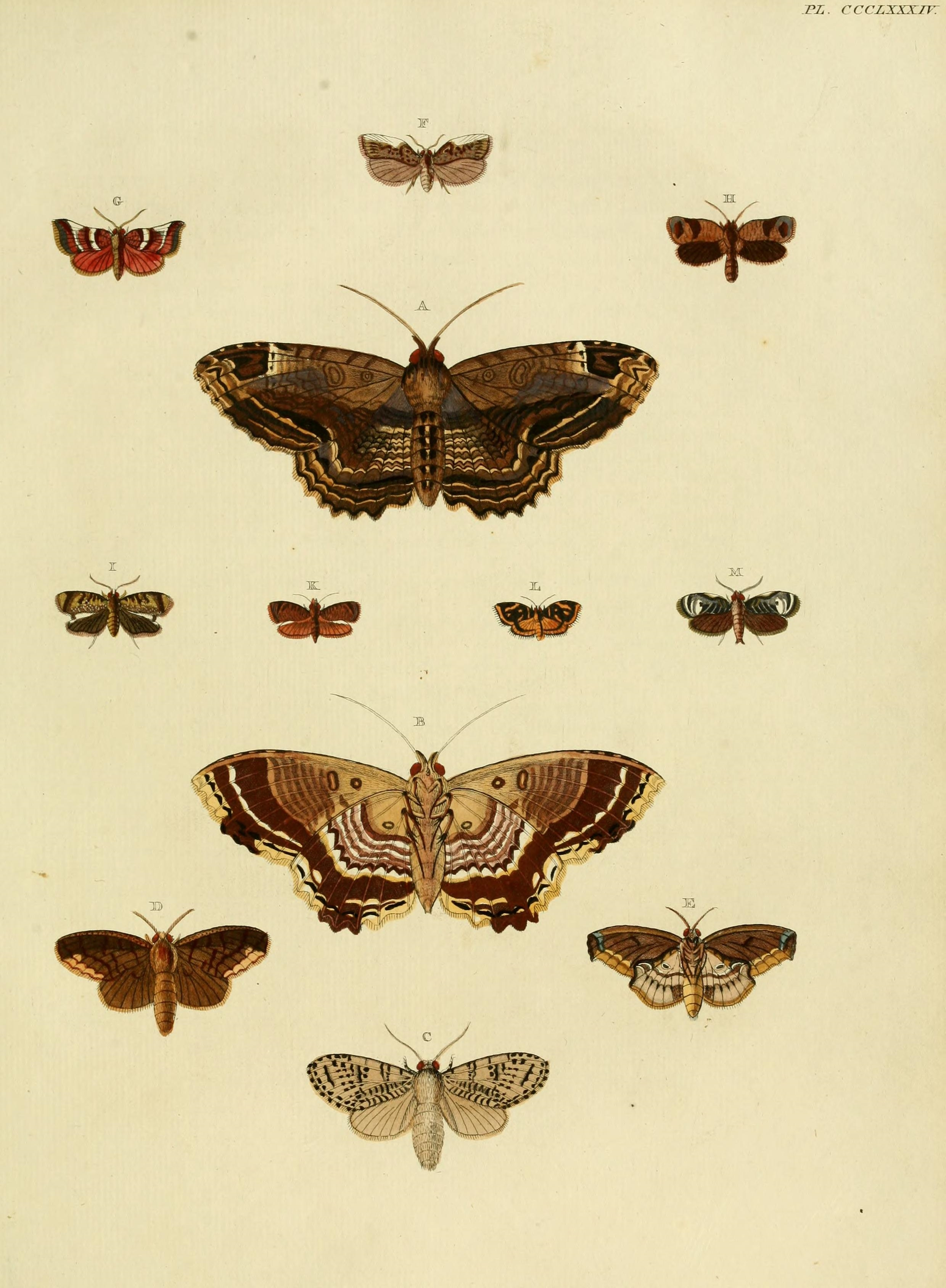

Cossus ziliante is a moth in the family Cossidae. It is found in Suriname.
