= Planctogystia =

Scientific classification
- Kingdom: Animalia
- Phylum: Arthropoda
- Clade: Pancrustacea
- Class: Insecta
- Order: Lepidoptera
- Family: Cossidae
- Subfamily: Cossinae
- Genus: Planctogystia; Schoorl, 1990

Genus of moths

Planctogystia is a genus of moths of the family Cossidae.

== Species ==
- Planctogystia albiplagiata (Gaede, 1930)
- Planctogystia breviculus (Mabille, 1880)
- Planctogystia brunneofasciatus (Gaede, 1930)
- Planctogystia crassilineatus (Gaede, 1930)
- Planctogystia fulvosparsus (Butler, 1882)
- Planctogystia gaedei (Schoorl, 1990)
- Planctogystia legraini Yakovlev & Saldaitis, 2011
- Planctogystia lemur Yakovlev, 2009
- Planctogystia olsoufieffae Yakovlev, 2011
- Planctogystia pavidus (Butler, 1882)
- Planctogystia parvulus (Kenrick, 1914)
- Planctogystia sakalava (Viette, 1958)
- Planctogystia senex (Butler, 1882)
