= Cossus crassicornis =

Scientific classification
- Kingdom: Animalia
- Phylum: Arthropoda
- Class: Insecta
- Order: Lepidoptera
- Family: Cossidae
- Genus: Cossus
- Species: C. crassicornis

Binomial name
- Cossus crassicornis (Fabricius, 1775)

Synonyms
- Bombyx crassicornis Fabricius, 1775

Species of moth

Cossus crassicornis is a moth in the family Cossidae. It is found in India.
