= Arctiocossus strigulatus =

Scientific classification
- Kingdom: Animalia
- Phylum: Arthropoda
- Clade: Pancrustacea
- Class: Insecta
- Order: Lepidoptera
- Family: Cossidae
- Genus: Arctiocossus
- Species: A. strigulatus

Binomial name
- Arctiocossus strigulatus Gaede, 1929

Species of moth

Arctiocossus strigulatus is a moth in the family Cossidae. It is found in Namibia.
