= Roepkiella siamica =

Scientific classification
- Kingdom: Animalia
- Phylum: Arthropoda
- Clade: Pancrustacea
- Class: Insecta
- Order: Lepidoptera
- Family: Cossidae
- Genus: Roepkiella
- Species: R. siamica

Binomial name
- Roepkiella siamica Yakovlev et Witt, 2009

Species of moth

Roepkiella siamica is a moth in the family Cossidae. It is found in Thailand and Myanmar.
