= Wittocossus =

Scientific classification
- Kingdom: Animalia
- Phylum: Arthropoda
- Clade: Pancrustacea
- Class: Insecta
- Order: Lepidoptera
- Family: Cossidae
- Subfamily: Cossinae
- Genus: Wittocossus; Yakovlev, 2004

Genus of moths

Wittocossus is a genus of moths in the family Cossidae.

== Species ==
- Wittocossus dellabrunai Saldaitis & Ivinskis, 2010
- Wittocossus mokanshanensis (Daniel, 1945)
