= Mirocossus =

Scientific classification
- Kingdom: Animalia
- Phylum: Arthropoda
- Clade: Pancrustacea
- Class: Insecta
- Order: Lepidoptera
- Family: Cossidae
- Subfamily: Cossinae
- Genus: Mirocossus; Schoorl, 1990

Genus of moths

Mirocossus is a genus of moths in the family Cossidae, described by J.W. Schoorl in 1990.

== Species ==
- Mirocossus badiala (D. S. Fletcher, 1968)
- Mirocossus haritonovi Yakovlev, 2011
- Mirocossus kibwezi Yakovlev, 2011
- Mirocossus mordkovitchi Yakovlev, 2011
- Mirocossus politzari Yakovlev, 2011
- Mirocossus sinevi Yakovlev, 2011
- Mirocossus siniaevi Yakovlev, 2011
- Mirocossus sombo Yakovlev, 2011
- Mirocossus sudanicus Yakovlev, 2011
