= Eremocossus asema =

Scientific classification
- Domain: Eukaryota
- Kingdom: Animalia
- Phylum: Arthropoda
- Class: Insecta
- Order: Lepidoptera
- Family: Cossidae
- Genus: Eremocossus
- Species: E. asema

Binomial name
- Eremocossus asema (Püngeler, 1899)

Synonyms
- Hypopta asema Püngeler, 1899

Species of insect

Eremocossus asema is a moth in the family Cossidae. It was described by de Pungeler in 1899. It is found in Turkmenistan and possibly Iran.
