= Brachylia murzini =

Scientific classification
- Kingdom: Animalia
- Phylum: Arthropoda
- Clade: Pancrustacea
- Class: Insecta
- Order: Lepidoptera
- Family: Blastobasidae
- Genus: Brachylia
- Species: B. murzini

Binomial name
- Brachylia murzini Yakovlev, 2011

Species of moth

Brachylia murzini is a moth in the family Cossidae. It is found in the Republic of Congo.
