= Cossus shmakovi =

Scientific classification
- Kingdom: Animalia
- Phylum: Arthropoda
- Clade: Pancrustacea
- Class: Insecta
- Order: Lepidoptera
- Family: Cossidae
- Genus: Cossus
- Species: C. shmakovi

Binomial name
- Cossus shmakovi Yakovlev, 2004

Species of moth

Cossus shmakovi is a moth in the family Cossidae. It is found in Tuva, Russia and possibly Mongolia.
