= Afroarabiella =

Scientific classification
- Kingdom: Animalia
- Phylum: Arthropoda
- Clade: Pancrustacea
- Class: Insecta
- Order: Lepidoptera
- Family: Cossidae
- Subfamily: Cossinae
- Genus: Afroarabiella; Yakovlev, 2008

Genus of moths

Afroarabiella is a genus of moths in the family Cossidae.

== Species ==
- Subgenus Afroarabiella
  - Afroarabiella buchanani (Rothschild, 1921)
  - Afroarabiella fanti (Hampson, 1910)
  - Afroarabiella namaquensis Yakovlev, 2014
  - Afroarabiella ochracea (Gaede, 1929)
  - Afroarabiella politzari Yakovlev, 2008
  - Afroarabiella tahamae (Wiltshire, 1949)
  - Afroarabiella tanzaniae Yakovlev, 2011
  - Afroarabiella ukambani Yakovlev, 2008
- Subgenus Meyoarabiella Yakovlev, 2008
  - Afroarabiella meyi Yakovlev, 2008
