= Arctiocossus ligatus =

Scientific classification
- Kingdom: Animalia
- Phylum: Arthropoda
- Class: Insecta
- Order: Lepidoptera
- Family: Cossidae
- Genus: Arctiocossus
- Species: A. ligatus

Binomial name
- Arctiocossus ligatus (Walker, 1865)

Synonyms
- Cossus ligatus Walker, 1865

Species of moth

Arctiocossus ligatus is a moth in the family Cossidae. It is found in Australia and South Africa.
