= Arctiocossus tessellatus =

Scientific classification
- Kingdom: Animalia
- Phylum: Arthropoda
- Clade: Pancrustacea
- Class: Insecta
- Order: Lepidoptera
- Family: Cossidae
- Genus: Arctiocossus
- Species: A. tessellatus

Binomial name
- Arctiocossus tessellatus Clench, 1959

Species of moth

Arctiocossus tessellatus is a moth in the family Cossidae described by Harry Kendon Clench in 1959. It is found in Namibia and South Africa.
