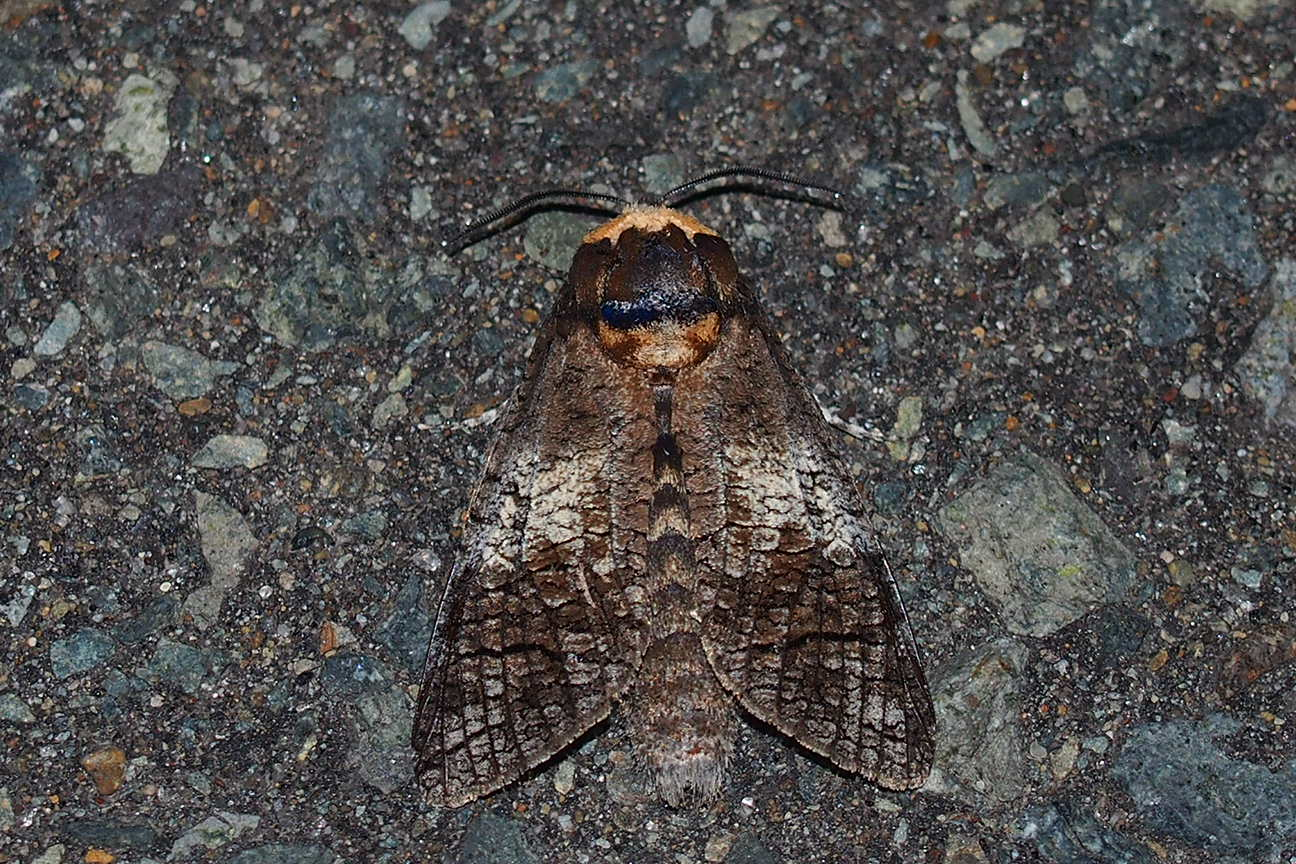
- Cossus orientalis

Scientific classification
- Kingdom: Animalia
- Phylum: Arthropoda
- Clade: Pancrustacea
- Class: Insecta
- Order: Lepidoptera
- Family: Cossidae
- Genus: Cossus
- Species: C. orientalis

Binomial name
- Cossus orientalis Gaede, 1929

Synonyms
- Cossus cossus orientalis Gaede, 1929; Cossus cossus changbaishanensis Hua, Chou, Fang et Chen, 1990

= Cossus orientalis =

Species of moth

Cossus orientalis is a moth in the family Cossidae. It is found in North Korea and China (Jilin), Russia and Japan.
