= Roerichiora bachma =

Scientific classification
- Kingdom: Animalia
- Phylum: Arthropoda
- Clade: Pancrustacea
- Class: Insecta
- Order: Lepidoptera
- Family: Cossidae
- Genus: Roerichiora
- Species: R. bachma

Binomial name
- Roerichiora bachma Yakovlev, 2011

Species of moth

Roerichiora bachma is a species of moth of the family Cossidae. It is found in Vietnam.
