= Arctiocossus castaneus =

Scientific classification
- Kingdom: Animalia
- Phylum: Arthropoda
- Class: Insecta
- Order: Lepidoptera
- Family: Cossidae
- Genus: Arctiocossus
- Species: A. castaneus

Binomial name
- Arctiocossus castaneus (Gaede, 1929)

Synonyms
- Pecticossus castaneus Gaede, 1929

Species of moth

Arctiocossus castaneus is a moth in the family Cossidae. It is found in South Africa.
