= Dyspessacossus hadjiensis =

Scientific classification
- Kingdom: Animalia
- Phylum: Arthropoda
- Class: Insecta
- Order: Lepidoptera
- Family: Cossidae
- Genus: Dyspessacossus
- Species: D. hadjiensis

Binomial name
- Dyspessacossus hadjiensis Daniel, 1953

Species of moth

Dyspessacossus hadjiensis is a moth in the family Cossidae. It was described by Franz Daniel in 1953. It is found in Iran.
