= Cossus afghanistana =

Scientific classification
- Kingdom: Animalia
- Phylum: Arthropoda
- Class: Insecta
- Order: Lepidoptera
- Family: Cossidae
- Genus: Cossus
- Species: C. afghanistana

Binomial name
- Cossus afghanistana Daniel, 1953

Synonyms
- Cossus cossus afghanistana Daniel, 1953

Species of moth

Cossus afghanistana is a moth in the family Cossidae. It is found in Afghanistan.
