= Aholcocerus ronkayorum =

Scientific classification
- Kingdom: Animalia
- Phylum: Arthropoda
- Clade: Pancrustacea
- Class: Insecta
- Order: Lepidoptera
- Family: Cossidae
- Genus: Aholcocerus
- Species: A. ronkayorum

Binomial name
- Aholcocerus ronkayorum Yakovlev, 2006

Species of moth

Aholcocerus ronkayorum is a moth in the family Cossidae. It is found in Pakistan.

== Etymology ==
The species is named in honour of Laszlo and Gabor Ronkay.
