= Mirocossus haritonovi =

Scientific classification
- Kingdom: Animalia
- Phylum: Arthropoda
- Clade: Pancrustacea
- Class: Insecta
- Order: Lepidoptera
- Family: Cossidae
- Genus: Mirocossus
- Species: M. haritonovi

Binomial name
- Mirocossus haritonovi Yakovlev, 2011

Species of moth

Mirocossus haritonovi is a moth in the family Cossidae. It was described by Yakovlev in 2011. It is found in Uganda.
