= Aholcocerus ihleorum =

Scientific classification
- Kingdom: Animalia
- Phylum: Arthropoda
- Clade: Pancrustacea
- Class: Insecta
- Order: Lepidoptera
- Family: Cossidae
- Genus: Aholcocerus
- Species: A. ihleorum

Binomial name
- Aholcocerus ihleorum Yakovlev & Witt, 2009

Species of moth

Aholcocerus ihleorum is a moth in the family Cossidae. It is found in Thailand.
