= Hirtocossus =

Scientific classification
- Kingdom: Animalia
- Phylum: Arthropoda
- Clade: Pancrustacea
- Class: Insecta
- Order: Lepidoptera
- Family: Cossidae
- Subfamily: Cossinae
- Genus: Hirtocossus; Schoorl, 1990

Genus of moths

Hirtocossus is a genus of moths of the family Cossidae from Madagascar.

Type species: Hirtocossus cirrilator (Le Cerf, 1919)

== Species ==
- Hirtocossus cirrilator (Le Cerf, 1919)
- Hirtocossus crucis (Kenrick, 1914)
