= Chinocossus =

Scientific classification
- Kingdom: Animalia
- Phylum: Arthropoda
- Clade: Pancrustacea
- Class: Insecta
- Order: Lepidoptera
- Family: Cossidae
- Subfamily: Cossinae
- Genus: Chinocossus; Yakovlev, 2006

Genus of moths

Chinocossus is a genus of moths in the family Cossidae.

== Species ==
- Chinocossus acronyctoides (Moore, 1879)
- Chinocossus greeni (Arora, 1976)
- Chinocossus hunanensis (Daniel, 1940)
- Chinocossus marcopoloi Yakovlev, 2006
- Chinocossus vjet Yakovlev, 2006
