= Planctogystia olsoufieffae =

Scientific classification
- Kingdom: Animalia
- Phylum: Arthropoda
- Clade: Pancrustacea
- Class: Insecta
- Order: Lepidoptera
- Family: Cossidae
- Genus: Planctogystia
- Species: P. olsoufieffae

Binomial name
- Planctogystia olsoufieffae Yakovlev, 2011

Species of moth

Planctogystia olsoufieffae is a moth in the family Cossidae. It is found in Madagascar.
