= Afroarabiella ochracea =

Scientific classification
- Domain: Eukaryota
- Kingdom: Animalia
- Phylum: Arthropoda
- Class: Insecta
- Order: Lepidoptera
- Family: Cossidae
- Genus: Afroarabiella
- Species: A. ochracea

Binomial name
- Afroarabiella ochracea (Gaede, 1929)

Synonyms
- Coryphodema ochracea Gaede, 1929

Species of moth

Afroarabiella ochracea is a moth in the family Cossidae. It is found in the Democratic Republic of Congo and Tanzania.
