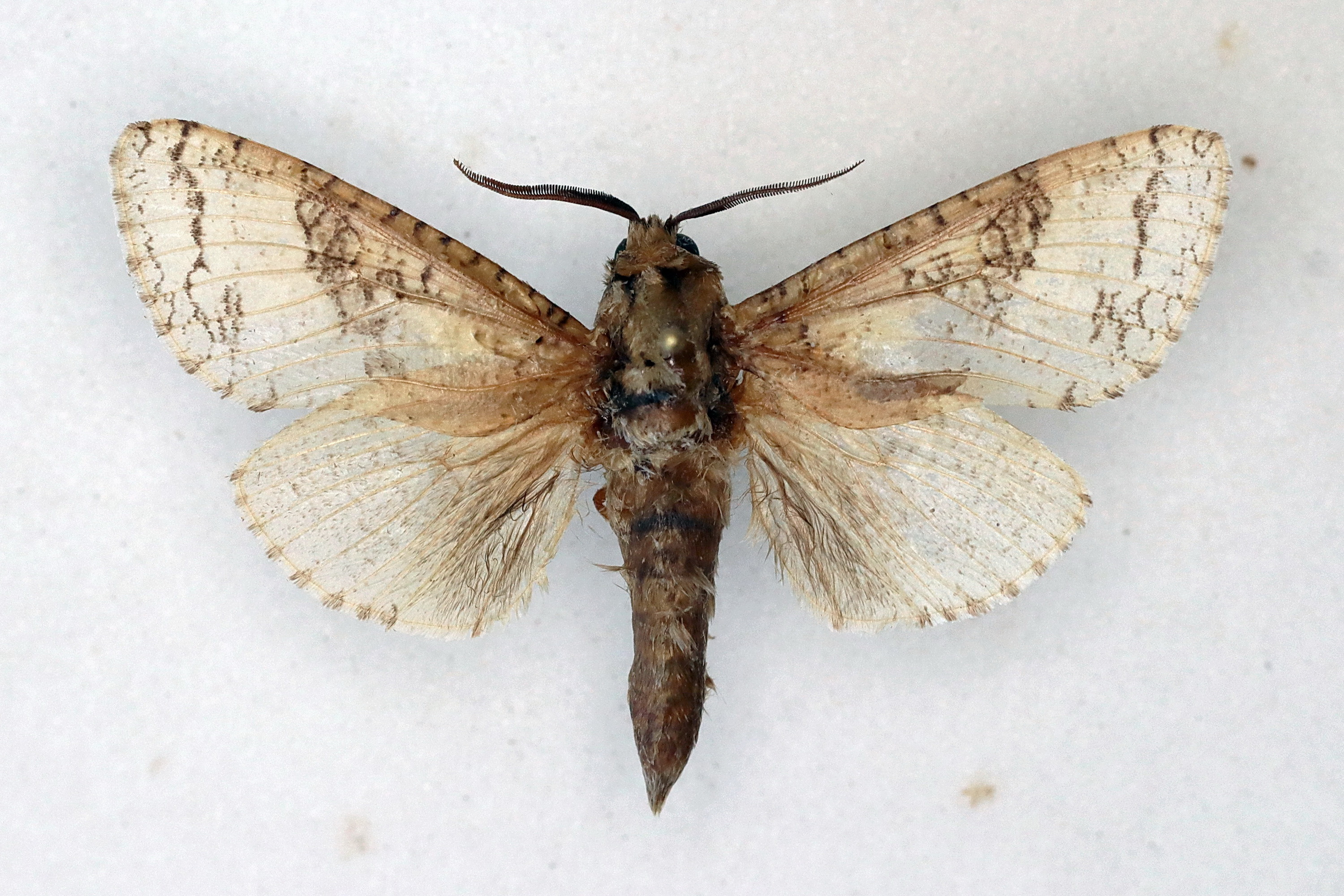
- Dyspessacossus fereidun

Scientific classification
- Kingdom: Animalia
- Phylum: Arthropoda
- Class: Insecta
- Order: Lepidoptera
- Family: Cossidae
- Subfamily: Cossinae
- Genus: Dyspessacossus; Daniel, 1953

= Dyspessacossus =

Genus of moths

Dyspessacossus is a genus of moths in the family Cossidae.

== Species ==
- Dyspessacossus fereidun Grum-Grshimailo, 1895
- Dyspessacossus funkei (Röber, 1896)
- Dyspessacossus hadjiensis Daniel, 1953
