= Cossus kerzhneri =

Scientific classification
- Kingdom: Animalia
- Phylum: Arthropoda
- Clade: Pancrustacea
- Class: Insecta
- Order: Lepidoptera
- Family: Cossidae
- Genus: Cossus
- Species: C. kerzhneri

Binomial name
- Cossus kerzhneri Yakovlev, 2011

Species of moth

Cossus kerzhneri is a moth in the family Cossidae. It is found in Mongolia.
