= Eremocossus nubica =

Scientific classification
- Kingdom: Animalia
- Phylum: Arthropoda
- Clade: Pancrustacea
- Class: Insecta
- Order: Lepidoptera
- Family: Cossidae
- Genus: Eremocossus
- Species: E. nubica

Binomial name
- Eremocossus nubica Yakovlev, 2008

Species of moth

Eremocossus nubica is a moth in the family Cossidae. It was described by Yakovlev in 2008. It is found in Sudan.
