= Arctiocossus poliopterus =

Scientific classification
- Kingdom: Animalia
- Phylum: Arthropoda
- Clade: Pancrustacea
- Class: Insecta
- Order: Lepidoptera
- Family: Cossidae
- Genus: Arctiocossus
- Species: A. poliopterus

Binomial name
- Arctiocossus poliopterus Clench, 1959

Species of moth

Arctiocossus poliopterus is a moth in the family Cossidae. It is found in Namibia and South Africa.
