= Kotchevnik durrelli =

Scientific classification
- Kingdom: Animalia
- Phylum: Arthropoda
- Clade: Pancrustacea
- Class: Insecta
- Order: Lepidoptera
- Family: Cossidae
- Genus: Kotchevnik
- Species: K. durrelli

Binomial name
- Kotchevnik durrelli Yakovlev, 2004

Species of moth

Kotchevnik durrelli is a moth in the family Cossidae. It is found in Armenia.
