= Brachylia nussi =

Scientific classification
- Kingdom: Animalia
- Phylum: Arthropoda
- Clade: Pancrustacea
- Class: Insecta
- Order: Lepidoptera
- Family: Blastobasidae
- Genus: Brachylia
- Species: B. nussi

Binomial name
- Brachylia nussi Yakovlev, 2011

Species of moth

Brachylia nussi is a moth in the family Cossidae. It was described by Yakovlev in 2011. It is found in Malawi.
