= Cossus bohatschi =

Scientific classification
- Kingdom: Animalia
- Phylum: Arthropoda
- Class: Insecta
- Order: Lepidoptera
- Family: Cossidae
- Genus: Cossus
- Species: C. bohatschi

Binomial name
- Cossus bohatschi Püngeler, 1898

Species of moth

Cossus bohatschi is a moth in the family Cossidae. It is found in Central Asia.
