= Kotchevnik =

Scientific classification
- Kingdom: Animalia
- Phylum: Arthropoda
- Clade: Pancrustacea
- Class: Insecta
- Order: Lepidoptera
- Family: Cossidae
- Subfamily: Cossinae
- Genus: Kotchevnik; Yakovlev, 2004

Genus of moths

Kotchevnik is a genus of moths in the family Cossidae.

== Species ==
- Kotchevnik baj Yakovlev, 2011
- Kotchevnik choui (Fang et Chen, 1989)
- Kotchevnik durrelli Yakovlev, 2004
- Kotchevnik modestus (Staudinger, 1887)
- Kotchevnik schablyai Yakovlev, 2004
- Kotchevnik tapinus (Püngeler, 1898)
