= Roepkiella =

Scientific classification
- Kingdom: Animalia
- Phylum: Arthropoda
- Clade: Pancrustacea
- Class: Insecta
- Order: Lepidoptera
- Family: Cossidae
- Subfamily: Cossinae
- Genus: Roepkiella; Yakovlev & Witt, 2009

Genus of moths

Roepkiella is a genus of moths in the family Cossidae.

== Species ==
- Roepkiella artushka (R.V. Yakovlev, 2006)
- Roepkiella celebensis (Roepke, 1957)
- Roepkiella chloratus (Swinhoe, 1892)
- Roepkiella chloratoides (Holloway, 1986)
- Roepkiella fuscibasis (Hampson, 1895)
- Roepkiella ingae Yakovlev, 2011
- Roepkiella javana (Roepke, 1957)
- Roepkiella loeffleri (R.V. Yakovlev, 2006)
- Roepkiella nigromaculata (Hampson, 1892)
- Roepkiella pusillus (Roepke, 1957)
- Roepkiella rufidorsia (Hampson, 1905)
- Roepkiella siamica Yakovlev & Witt, 2009
- Roepkiella subfuscus (Snellen, 1895)
- Roepkiella thaika (R.V. Yakovlev, 2006)
