= Planctogystia gaedei =

Scientific classification
- Kingdom: Animalia
- Phylum: Arthropoda
- Clade: Pancrustacea
- Class: Insecta
- Order: Lepidoptera
- Family: Cossidae
- Genus: Planctogystia
- Species: P. gaedei

Binomial name
- Planctogystia gaedei (Schoorl, 1990)

Synonyms
- Cossus gaedei Schoorl, 1990; Cossus fuscibasis Gaede, 1930

Species of moth

Planctogystia gaedei is a moth of the family Cossidae. It is found in northern Madagascar. The name of this species is a replacement name for a species described in 1930 by Max Gaede, Cossus fuscibasis.

== See also ==
- List of moths of Madagascar
