= Roerichiora =

Scientific classification
- Kingdom: Animalia
- Phylum: Arthropoda
- Clade: Pancrustacea
- Class: Insecta
- Order: Lepidoptera
- Family: Cossidae
- Subfamily: Zeuzerinae
- Genus: Roerichiora; Yakovlev & Witt, 2009

Genus of moths

Roerichiora is a genus of moths in the family Cossidae.

== Species ==
- Roerichiora bachma Yakovlev, 2011
- Roerichiora clara (Bryk, 1950)
- Roerichiora obliquifascia (Bryk, 1950)
- Roerichiora stigmatica (Moore, 1879)
