= Kotchevnik baj =

Scientific classification
- Kingdom: Animalia
- Phylum: Arthropoda
- Clade: Pancrustacea
- Class: Insecta
- Order: Lepidoptera
- Family: Cossidae
- Genus: Kotchevnik
- Species: K. baj

Binomial name
- Kotchevnik baj Yakovlev, 2011

Species of moth

Kotchevnik baj is a moth in the family Cossidae. It is found in central Kazakhstan.
