= Afroarabiella meyi =

Scientific classification
- Kingdom: Animalia
- Phylum: Arthropoda
- Clade: Pancrustacea
- Class: Insecta
- Order: Lepidoptera
- Family: Cossidae
- Genus: Afroarabiella
- Species: A. meyi

Binomial name
- Afroarabiella meyi Yakovlev, 2008

Species of moth

Afroarabiella meyi is a moth in the family Cossidae. It is found in South Africa.
