= Roerichiora clara =

Scientific classification
- Kingdom: Animalia
- Phylum: Arthropoda
- Class: Insecta
- Order: Lepidoptera
- Family: Cossidae
- Genus: Roerichiora
- Species: R. clara

Binomial name
- Roerichiora clara (Bryk, 1950)

Synonyms
- Xyleutes clara Bryk, 1950

Species of moth

Roerichiora clara is a species of moth of the family Cossidae. It is found in India, Nepal, Bhutan, Myanmar and Vietnam.
