= Afroarabiella ukambani =

Scientific classification
- Kingdom: Animalia
- Phylum: Arthropoda
- Clade: Pancrustacea
- Class: Insecta
- Order: Lepidoptera
- Family: Cossidae
- Genus: Afroarabiella
- Species: A. ukambani

Binomial name
- Afroarabiella ukambani Yakovlev, 2008

Species of moth

Afroarabiella ukambani is a moth in the family Cossidae. It is found in Kenya and Somalia.
