= Afroarabiella namaquensis =

Scientific classification
- Kingdom: Animalia
- Phylum: Arthropoda
- Clade: Pancrustacea
- Class: Insecta
- Order: Lepidoptera
- Family: Cossidae
- Genus: Afroarabiella
- Species: A. namaquensis

Binomial name
- Afroarabiella namaquensis Yakovlev, 2014

Species of moth

Afroarabiella namaquensis is a moth in the family Cossidae. It is found in South Africa.
