= Kotchevnik choui =

Scientific classification
- Kingdom: Animalia
- Phylum: Arthropoda
- Clade: Pancrustacea
- Class: Insecta
- Order: Lepidoptera
- Family: Cossidae
- Genus: Kotchevnik
- Species: K. choui

Binomial name
- Kotchevnik choui (Fang et Chen, 1989)

Synonyms
- Parahypopta choui Fang et Chen, 1989

Species of moth

Kotchevnik choui is a moth in the family Cossidae. It is found in China.
