= Roepkiella thaika =

Scientific classification
- Kingdom: Animalia
- Phylum: Arthropoda
- Clade: Pancrustacea
- Class: Insecta
- Order: Lepidoptera
- Family: Cossidae
- Genus: Roepkiella
- Species: R. thaika

Binomial name
- Roepkiella thaika (Yakovlev, 2006)

Synonyms
- Paracossus thaika Yakovlev, 2006

Species of moth

Roepkiella thaika is a moth in the family Cossidae. It was described by Yakovlev in 2006. It is found in southern Thailand and Vietnam.

The length of the forewings is about 10 mm.

== Etymology ==
The species name is derived from Russian thaika (meaning a Thai woman).
