= Dyspessacossus funkei =

Scientific classification
- Kingdom: Animalia
- Phylum: Arthropoda
- Class: Insecta
- Order: Lepidoptera
- Family: Cossidae
- Genus: Dyspessacossus
- Species: D. funkei

Binomial name
- Dyspessacossus funkei (Röber, 1896)

Synonyms
- Trypanus funkei Röber, 1896; Cossus funkei

Species of moth

Dyspessacossus funkei is a moth in the family Cossidae. It is found in the Taurus Mountains in Turkey, as well as in Lebanon, Syria and Iran.

== Description/Attributes ==
The Dyspessacossus funkei has a wingspan of 47 millimeters. The antennae, palps (mouth parts), legs, and wing veins closely resemble that of a Cossus cossus, what Röber then referred to as a Trypanus Cossus ligniperda. Their head and neck collar are gray, the neck having a narrow, light, yellowish hem on the back. The shoulder covers, thorax are a darker gray, while the abdomen, palps, body underside and legs are a dark gray. Their wings are striped and dark, and stronger than the previously mentioned Cossus cossus.

== History/Discovery ==
The Dyspessacossus funkei's first documented discovery occurred July 5th, 1896 via German insect dealer Emil Funke. Mr. Funke had gone on a collection expedition to what seems to be the snowy Taurus Mountains in Turkey. Upon returning to Dresden, Germany, Funke brought two insects to German scientist Von J. Röber. Röber noted that one of the moth species was already documented, but the other was not. He noted that it was part of an already known genus at the time, bringing the first part of the name Trypanus. Röber then decided to name the species in Mr. Emil Funke's honor, leading to the original name of Trypanus funkei.
