= Mirocossus siniaevi =

Scientific classification
- Kingdom: Animalia
- Phylum: Arthropoda
- Clade: Pancrustacea
- Class: Insecta
- Order: Lepidoptera
- Family: Cossidae
- Genus: Mirocossus
- Species: M. siniaevi

Binomial name
- Mirocossus siniaevi Yakovlev, 2011

Species of moth

Mirocossus siniaevi is a moth in the family Cossidae. It was described by Yakovlev in 2011. It is found in the Republic of Congo.
