= Gobibatyr =

Scientific classification
- Kingdom: Animalia
- Phylum: Arthropoda
- Clade: Pancrustacea
- Class: Insecta
- Order: Lepidoptera
- Family: Cossidae
- Subfamily: Cossinae
- Genus: Gobibatyr; Yakovlev, 2004

Genus of moths

Gobibatyr is a genus of moths in the family Cossidae.

== Species ==
- Gobibatyr colossus (Staudinger, 1887)
- Gobibatyr ustyuzhanini Yakovlev, 2004
