= Arctiocossus punctifera =

Scientific classification
- Kingdom: Animalia
- Phylum: Arthropoda
- Class: Insecta
- Order: Lepidoptera
- Family: Cossidae
- Genus: Arctiocossus
- Species: A. punctifera

Binomial name
- Arctiocossus punctifera Gaede, 1929

Species of moth

Arctiocossus punctifera is a moth in the family Cossidae. It is found in Tanzania.
