= Roepkiella loeffleri =

Scientific classification
- Kingdom: Animalia
- Phylum: Arthropoda
- Clade: Pancrustacea
- Class: Insecta
- Order: Lepidoptera
- Family: Cossidae
- Genus: Roepkiella
- Species: R. loeffleri

Binomial name
- Roepkiella loeffleri (Yakovlev, 2006)

Synonyms
- Paracossus loeffleri Yakovlev, 2006

Species of moth

Roepkiella loeffleri is a moth in the family Cossidae. It was described by Yakovlev in 2006. It is found in Vietnam.

The length of the forewings is about 18 mm.

== Etymology ==
The species is named in honour of S. Loeffler.
