= Brachylia vukutu =

Scientific classification
- Kingdom: Animalia
- Phylum: Arthropoda
- Clade: Pancrustacea
- Class: Insecta
- Order: Lepidoptera
- Family: Blastobasidae
- Genus: Brachylia
- Species: B. vukutu

Binomial name
- Brachylia vukutu Yakovlev & Lenz, 2013

Species of moth

Brachylia vukutu is a moth in the family Cossidae. It was described by Yakovlev and Lenz in 2013. It is found in Zimbabwe.
