= Afroarabiella buchanani =

Scientific classification
- Domain: Eukaryota
- Kingdom: Animalia
- Phylum: Arthropoda
- Class: Insecta
- Order: Lepidoptera
- Family: Cossidae
- Genus: Afroarabiella
- Species: A. buchanani

Binomial name
- Afroarabiella buchanani (Rothschild, 1921)

Synonyms
- Paropta buchanani Rothschild, 1921

Species of moth

Afroarabiella buchanani is a moth in the family Cossidae. It is found in Niger.
