= Arctiocossus antargyreus =

Scientific classification
- Kingdom: Animalia
- Phylum: Arthropoda
- Class: Insecta
- Order: Lepidoptera
- Family: Cossidae
- Genus: Arctiocossus
- Species: A. antargyreus

Binomial name
- Arctiocossus antargyreus Felder, 1874

Synonyms
- Arctiocossus antagyreus Felder, 1874

Species of moth

Arctiocossus antargyreus is a moth in the family Cossidae. It is found in Namibia and South Africa.
