= Cossus horrifer =

Scientific classification
- Kingdom: Animalia
- Phylum: Arthropoda
- Class: Insecta
- Order: Lepidoptera
- Family: Cossidae
- Genus: Cossus
- Species: C. horrifer

Binomial name
- Cossus horrifer Schaus, 1892

Species of moth

Cossus horrifer is a moth in the family Cossidae. It is found in Brazil.
