= Cossus dentilinea =

Scientific classification
- Kingdom: Animalia
- Phylum: Arthropoda
- Class: Insecta
- Order: Lepidoptera
- Family: Cossidae
- Genus: Cossus
- Species: C. dentilinea

Binomial name
- Cossus dentilinea (H. Druce, 1911)

Synonyms
- Brachylia dentilinea H. Druce, 1911

Species of moth

Cossus dentilinea is a moth in the family Cossidae first described by Herbert Druce in 1911. It is found in Colombia.
