= Cossus subocellatus =

Scientific classification
- Kingdom: Animalia
- Phylum: Arthropoda
- Class: Insecta
- Order: Lepidoptera
- Family: Cossidae
- Genus: Cossus
- Species: C. subocellatus

Binomial name
- Cossus subocellatus Walker, 1856

Species of moth

Cossus subocellatus is a moth in the family Cossidae. The distribution of the species is unknown.

The forewings are imperfectly reticulated with black, with a straight slightly oblique black band near the base, and with two slender curved black subapical bands, one in front, the other behind. The hindwings are slightly reticulated, brownish above.
