= Roepkiella chloratoides =

Scientific classification
- Kingdom: Animalia
- Phylum: Arthropoda
- Clade: Pancrustacea
- Class: Insecta
- Order: Lepidoptera
- Family: Cossidae
- Genus: Roepkiella
- Species: R. chloratoides

Binomial name
- Roepkiella chloratoides (Holloway, 1986)

Synonyms
- Cossus chloratoides Holloway, 1986

Species of moth

Roepkiella chloratoides is a moth in the family Cossidae. It is found on Borneo. The habitat consists of lowland areas and hill dipterocarp forests.

The length of the forewings is 17 mm for males and about 19 mm for females.
