= Eremocossus almeriana =

Scientific classification
- Kingdom: Animalia
- Phylum: Arthropoda
- Clade: Pancrustacea
- Class: Insecta
- Order: Lepidoptera
- Family: Cossidae
- Genus: Eremocossus
- Species: E. almeriana

Binomial name
- Eremocossus almeriana (de Freina & Witt, 1990)

Synonyms
- Dyspessa foeda almeriana de Freina & Witt, 1990

Species of moth

Eremocossus almeriana is a moth in the family Cossidae. It was described by Josef J. de Freina and Thomas Joseph Witt in 1990. It is found in south-eastern Spain.
