= Brachylia rectangulata =

Scientific classification
- Domain: Eukaryota
- Kingdom: Animalia
- Phylum: Arthropoda
- Class: Insecta
- Order: Lepidoptera
- Family: Blastobasidae
- Genus: Brachylia
- Species: B. rectangulata

Binomial name
- Brachylia rectangulata (Wichgraf, 1921)

Synonyms
- Cossus rectangulata Wichgraf, 1921; Cossus rectangulatus; Brachylia rectangulatus

Species of moth

Brachylia rectangulata is a moth in the family Cossidae. It was described by Wichgraf in 1921. It is found in Malawi and Tanzania.
