= Planctogystia pavidus =

Scientific classification
- Domain: Eukaryota
- Kingdom: Animalia
- Phylum: Arthropoda
- Class: Insecta
- Order: Lepidoptera
- Family: Cossidae
- Genus: Planctogystia
- Species: P. pavidus

Binomial name
- Planctogystia pavidus (Butler, 1882)

Synonyms
- Cossus pavidus Butler, 1882; Cossus pavida; Planctogystia pavida

Species of moth

Planctogystia pavidus is a moth in the family Cossidae. It is found in Madagascar.
