= Roepkiella subfuscus =

Scientific classification
- Kingdom: Animalia
- Phylum: Arthropoda
- Class: Insecta
- Order: Lepidoptera
- Family: Cossidae
- Genus: Roepkiella
- Species: R. subfuscus

Binomial name
- Roepkiella subfuscus (Snellen, 1895)

Synonyms
- Trypanus subfuscus Snellen, 1895; Paracossus subfuscus; Paracossus subfusca; Cossus subfuscus

Species of moth

Roepkiella subfuscus is a moth in the family Cossidae. It is found on Java and Sumatra and in Vietnam.
