= Brachylia nigeriae =

Scientific classification
- Domain: Eukaryota
- Kingdom: Animalia
- Phylum: Arthropoda
- Class: Insecta
- Order: Lepidoptera
- Family: Blastobasidae
- Genus: Brachylia
- Species: B. nigeriae

Binomial name
- Brachylia nigeriae (Bethune-Baker, 1915)

Synonyms
- Lebedodes nigeriae Bethune-Baker, 1915

Species of moth

Brachylia nigeriae is a moth in the family Cossidae. It was described by George Thomas Bethune-Baker in 1915. It is found in Nigeria.
