= Gymnelema vinctus =

Scientific classification
- Kingdom: Animalia
- Phylum: Arthropoda
- Clade: Pancrustacea
- Class: Insecta
- Order: Lepidoptera
- Family: Psychidae
- Genus: Gymnelema
- Species: G. vinctus

Binomial name
- Gymnelema vinctus (Walker, 1865)

Synonyms
- Cossus vinctus Walker, 1865; Cossus incanescens Butler, 1875

Species of moth

Gymnelema vinctus is a moth in the family Psychidae. It is found in South Africa.
