= Afroarabiella fanti =

Scientific classification
- Kingdom: Animalia
- Phylum: Arthropoda
- Class: Insecta
- Order: Lepidoptera
- Family: Cossidae
- Genus: Afroarabiella
- Species: A. fanti

Binomial name
- Afroarabiella fanti (Hampson, 1910)

Synonyms
- Cossus fanti Hampson, 1910

Species of moth

Afroarabiella fanti is a moth in the family Cossidae. It is found in Ghana.
