= Roepkiella fuscibasis =

Scientific classification
- Kingdom: Animalia
- Phylum: Arthropoda
- Class: Insecta
- Order: Lepidoptera
- Family: Cossidae
- Genus: Roepkiella
- Species: R. fuscibasis

Binomial name
- Roepkiella fuscibasis (Hampson, 1895)

Synonyms
- Cossus fuscibasis Hampson, 1895

Species of moth

Roepkiella fuscibasis is a moth in the family Cossidae. It is found in Burma.
