= Afroarabiella tahamae =

Scientific classification
- Kingdom: Animalia
- Phylum: Arthropoda
- Class: Insecta
- Order: Lepidoptera
- Family: Cossidae
- Genus: Afroarabiella
- Species: A. tahamae

Binomial name
- Afroarabiella tahamae (Wiltshire, 1949)

Synonyms
- Cossus tahamae Wiltshire, 1949

Species of moth

Afroarabiella tahamae is a moth in the family Cossidae. It is found in Saudi Arabia and Yemen.
