= Brachylia terebroides =

Scientific classification
- Domain: Eukaryota
- Kingdom: Animalia
- Phylum: Arthropoda
- Class: Insecta
- Order: Lepidoptera
- Family: Blastobasidae
- Genus: Brachylia
- Species: B. terebroides

Binomial name
- Brachylia terebroides Felder, 1874

Synonyms
- Cossus terebroides; Brachylia tenebroides Dalla Torre, 1923

Species of moth

Brachylia terebroides is a moth in the family Cossidae. It was described by Felder in 1874. It is found in Kenya, Namibia and South Africa.

The larvae have been recorded feeding on Acacia karroo.
