= Planctogystia crassilineatus =

Scientific classification
- Domain: Eukaryota
- Kingdom: Animalia
- Phylum: Arthropoda
- Class: Insecta
- Order: Lepidoptera
- Family: Cossidae
- Genus: Planctogystia
- Species: P. crassilineatus

Binomial name
- Planctogystia crassilineatus (Gaede, 1930)

Synonyms
- Cossus crassilineatus Gaede, 1930

Species of moth

Planctogystia crassilineatus is a moth in the family Cossidae. It is found in Madagascar.
