= Mirocossus badiala =

Scientific classification
- Kingdom: Animalia
- Phylum: Arthropoda
- Class: Insecta
- Order: Lepidoptera
- Family: Cossidae
- Genus: Mirocossus
- Species: M. badiala

Binomial name
- Mirocossus badiala (D. S. Fletcher, 1968)

Synonyms
- Brachylia badiala D. S. Fletcher, 1968; Cossus badiala

Species of moth

Mirocossus badiala is a moth in the family Cossidae. It was described by David Stephen Fletcher in 1968. It is found in Kenya, Malawi, Tanzania, Uganda and Zimbabwe.
