= Planctogystia parvulus =

Scientific classification
- Kingdom: Animalia
- Phylum: Arthropoda
- Class: Insecta
- Order: Lepidoptera
- Family: Cossidae
- Genus: Planctogystia
- Species: P. parvulus

Binomial name
- Planctogystia parvulus (Kenrick, 1914)

Synonyms
- Cossus parvulus Kenrick, 1914

Species of moth

Planctogystia parvulus is a moth of the family Cossidae. It is found in Madagascar.

This is a large, heavy moth with a wingspan of 40 to 64 mm. The frontwings are whitish, covered with cossid reticulations, including a fairly marked median line. On the costa there are 5 black spots. The hindwings are uniformly dark grey.
