= Chinocossus greeni =

Scientific classification
- Domain: Eukaryota
- Kingdom: Animalia
- Phylum: Arthropoda
- Class: Insecta
- Order: Lepidoptera
- Family: Cossidae
- Genus: Chinocossus
- Species: C. greeni

Binomial name
- Chinocossus greeni (Arora, 1976)

Synonyms
- Cossus greeni Arora, 1976

Species of moth

Chinocossus greeni is a moth in the family Cossidae. It was described by G.S. Arora in 1976. It is found in Sri Lanka.
