= Kotchevnik tapinus =

Scientific classification
- Kingdom: Animalia
- Phylum: Arthropoda
- Class: Insecta
- Order: Lepidoptera
- Family: Cossidae
- Genus: Kotchevnik
- Species: K. tapinus

Binomial name
- Kotchevnik tapinus (Püngeler, 1898)

Synonyms
- Cossus tapinus Püngeler, 1898

Species of moth

Kotchevnik tapinus is a moth in the family Cossidae. It is found in Central Asia, where it has been recorded from Tajikistan, Turkmenistan, Iran, Afghanistan and Pakistan.
