= Brachylia semicurvatus =

Scientific classification
- Domain: Eukaryota
- Kingdom: Animalia
- Phylum: Arthropoda
- Class: Insecta
- Order: Lepidoptera
- Family: Blastobasidae
- Genus: Brachylia
- Species: B. semicurvatus

Binomial name
- Brachylia semicurvatus (Gaede, 1930)

Synonyms
- Cossus semicurvatus Gaede, 1930

Species of moth

Brachylia semicurvatus is a moth in the family Cossidae. It was described by Max Gaede in 1930. It is found in Africa.
