= Arctiocossus gaerdesi =

Scientific classification
- Kingdom: Animalia
- Phylum: Arthropoda
- Class: Insecta
- Order: Lepidoptera
- Family: Cossidae
- Genus: Arctiocossus
- Species: A. gaerdesi

Binomial name
- Arctiocossus gaerdesi (Daniel, 1956)

Synonyms
- Pecticossus gaerdesi Daniel, 1956; Cossus gaerdesi

Species of moth

Arctiocossus gaerdesi is a moth in the family Cossidae described by Franz Daniel in 1956. It is found in Namibia.

The larvae feed on Zygophyllum stapffii.
