= Planctogystia sakalava =

Scientific classification
- Kingdom: Animalia
- Phylum: Arthropoda
- Class: Insecta
- Order: Lepidoptera
- Family: Cossidae
- Genus: Planctogystia
- Species: P. sakalava

Binomial name
- Planctogystia sakalava (Viette, 1957)

Synonyms
- Cossus sakalava Viette, 1957

Species of moth

Planctogystia sakalava is a moth in the family Cossidae. It is found in Madagascar.
