= Hirtocossus cirrilator =

Scientific classification
- Domain: Eukaryota
- Kingdom: Animalia
- Phylum: Arthropoda
- Class: Insecta
- Order: Lepidoptera
- Family: Cossidae
- Genus: Hirtocossus
- Species: H. cirrilator

Binomial name
- Hirtocossus cirrilator (Le Cerf, 1919)

Synonyms
- Cossus cirrilator Le Cerf, 1919

Species of moth

Hirtocossus cirrilator is a moth of the family Cossidae. It is found in Madagascar.

The wings of this moth are white with three large light-brown cellspots. The body and abdomen are white with brownish and blackish scales. The wingspan of the male is 73.5 mm.

== See also ==
- List of moths of Madagascar
