= Roepkiella javana =

Scientific classification
- Domain: Eukaryota
- Kingdom: Animalia
- Phylum: Arthropoda
- Class: Insecta
- Order: Lepidoptera
- Family: Cossidae
- Genus: Roepkiella
- Species: R. javana

Binomial name
- Roepkiella javana (Roepke, 1957)

Synonyms
- Cossus javana Roepke, 1957; Paracossus javana Roepke, 1957; Roepkiella javanus

Species of moth

Roepkiella javana is a moth in the family Cossidae. It is found on Java.
