= Planctogystia fulvosparsus =

Scientific classification
- Domain: Eukaryota
- Kingdom: Animalia
- Phylum: Arthropoda
- Class: Insecta
- Order: Lepidoptera
- Family: Cossidae
- Genus: Planctogystia
- Species: P. fulvosparsus

Binomial name
- Planctogystia fulvosparsus (Butler, 1882)

Synonyms
- Cossus fulvosparsa Butler, 1882; Planctogystia fulvosparsa; Cossus fulvosmarsus var. smaragdinus Butler, 1882; Cossus fulvospars Dalla-Torre, 1923

Species of moth

Planctogystia fulvosparsus is a moth in the family Cossidae. It is found in Madagascar.
