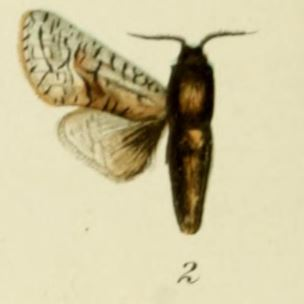

Scientific classification
- Domain: Eukaryota
- Kingdom: Animalia
- Phylum: Arthropoda
- Class: Insecta
- Order: Lepidoptera
- Family: Blastobasidae
- Genus: Brachylia
- Species: B. reussi

Binomial name
- Brachylia reussi (Strand, 1913)

Synonyms
- Cossus reussi Strand, 1913

= Brachylia reussi =

Species of moth

Brachylia reussi is a moth in the family Cossidae. It was described by Strand in 1913. It is found in Malawi and Tanzania.
