= Brachylia kwouus =

Scientific classification
- Domain: Eukaryota
- Kingdom: Animalia
- Phylum: Arthropoda
- Class: Insecta
- Order: Lepidoptera
- Family: Blastobasidae
- Genus: Brachylia
- Species: B. kwouus

Binomial name
- Brachylia kwouus (Karsch, 1898)

Synonyms
- Trypanus kwouus Karsch, 1898; Cossus kwouus

Species of moth

Brachylia kwouus is a moth in the family Cossidae. It is found in Tanzania.
