= Brachylia incanescens =

Scientific classification
- Kingdom: Animalia
- Phylum: Arthropoda
- Clade: Pancrustacea
- Class: Insecta
- Order: Lepidoptera
- Family: Blastobasidae
- Genus: Brachylia
- Species: B. incanescens

Binomial name
- Brachylia incanescens (Butler, 1875)

Synonyms
- Cossus incanescens Butler, 1875

Species of moth

Brachylia incanescens is a moth in the family Cossidae. It is found in South Africa.
