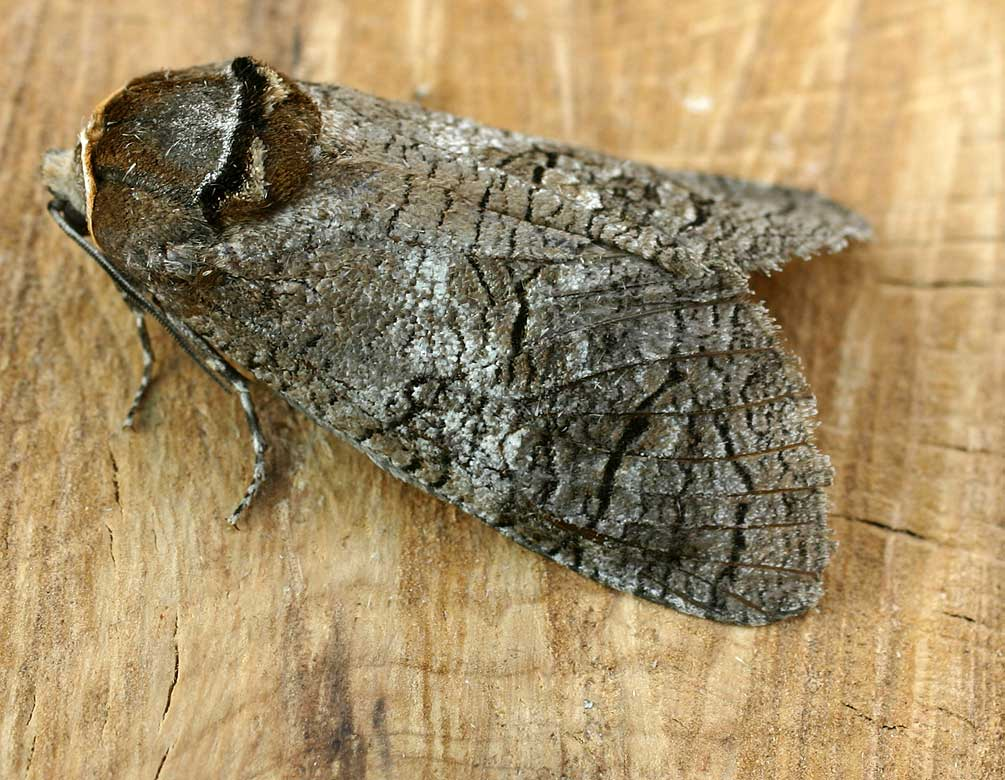

Scientific classification
- Kingdom: Animalia
- Phylum: Arthropoda
- Clade: Pancrustacea
- Class: Insecta
- Order: Lepidoptera
- Family: Cossidae
- Genus: Cossus
- Species: C. cossus

Binomial name
- Cossus cossus (Linnaeus, 1758)

Synonyms
- Phalaena cossus Linnaeus, 1758; Bombyx unguiculatus Fabricius, 1793; Cossus ligniperda Fabricius, 1794; Cossus balcanicus Lederer, 1863; Cossus cossus stygianus Stichel, 1908; Cossus cossus ab. subnigra O. Schultz, 1911; Cossus cossus f. aceris Greip, 1918; Cossus cossus f. nigra Dietze, 1919; Cossus cossus altensis B. Hua, 1990; Cossus araraticus Teich, 1896; Cossus giganteus Schwingenschuss, 1938; Cossus lucifer Grum-Grshimailo, 1891; Cossus chinensis Rothschild, 1912; Cossus cosso Püngeler, 1898

= Cossus cossus =

Goat moth

Species of moth

Cossus cossus, the goat moth, is a moth of the family Cossidae. It is found in Northern Africa, Asia and Europe.

== Biology ==
This is a large heavy moth with a wingspan of 68–96 mm. The wings are greyish brown and marked with fine dark cross lines. The moth flies from April to August depending on the location.

The caterpillars have a red/purple stripe across the back and a black head. They reach a length of 9–10 cm. The caterpillars feed in the trunks and branches of a wide variety of trees (see list below), taking three to five years to mature. The caterpillar holes can be found low on the stem (maximum 1.0–1.5 m above the ground). When ready to pupate the caterpillar leaves the tree to find a suitable spot.

The species prefer humid environments. Both the larva and moth have a smell reminiscent of goat, hence its name.

== As a food ==
Pliny reported in Natural History that a grub which he gives the name cossus was considered a Roman delicacy after it was fed with flour. Some writers have equated this with Cossus cossus, but Pliny specifies that his cossus is found in oak trees, which makes this identification unlikely.

== Recorded food plants ==
- Alnus
- Betula
- Castanea
- Citrus
- Cydonia
- Fagus
- Fraxinus
- Juglans
- Malus
- Olea
- Populus
- Prunus
- Pyrus
- Quercus
- Salix
- Sorbus
- Ulmus
- Vitis

It has a preference for Populus, Quercus and Salix.

== Taxonomy ==
Cossus balcanicus Lederer, 1863 from Bulgaria is probably a hybrid between C. cossus and Lamellocossus terebrus (Denis & Schiffermüller, 1775).

== Subspecies ==
- Cossus cossus cossus
- Cossus cossus albescens Kitt, 1925 (Kazakhstan, Russia)
- Cossus cossus araraticus Teich, 1896 (Georgia, Azerbaijan, Turkey, Iran)
- Cossus cossus armeniacus Rothschild, 1912 (Turkey)
- Cossus cossus chinensis Rothschild, 1912 (China: Shaanxi)
- Cossus cossus dauricus Yakovlev, 2007 (Russia: Transbaikal)
- Cossus cossus dersu Yakovlev, 2009 (Russia: southern Ussuri, Primorsky Krai)
- Cossus cossus deserta Daniel, 1953 (Mongolia)
- Cossus cossus gueruenensis Friedel, 1977 (Asia Minor)
- Cossus cossus kopetdaghi Yakovlev, 2009 (Turkmenistan)
- Cossus cossus kossai Wiltshire, 1957 (Iraq, Jordan)
- Cossus cossus lucifer Grum-Grshimailo, 1891 (Tibet)
- Cossus cossus mongolicus Erschoff, 1882 (Mongolia)
- Cossus cossus omrana Wiltshire, 1957 (Iraq, Iran)
- Cossus cossus tianshanus Hua, Chou, Fang & Chen, 1990 (Kazakhstan, Kyrgyzstan, Uzbekistan, Tajikistan, Afghanistan)
- Cossus cossus uralicus Seitz, 1912 (Uralsk)

== Gallery ==
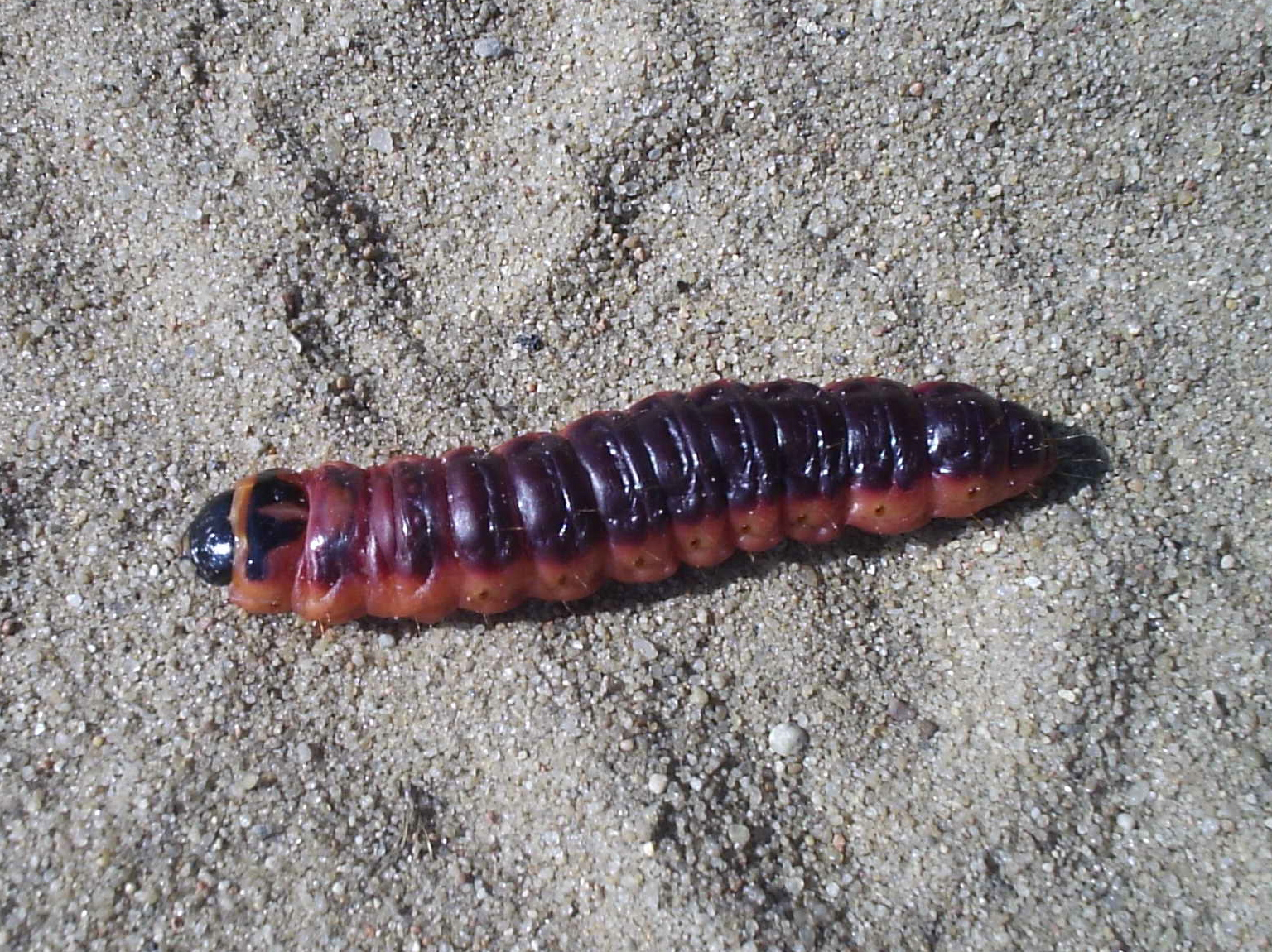
Caterpillar

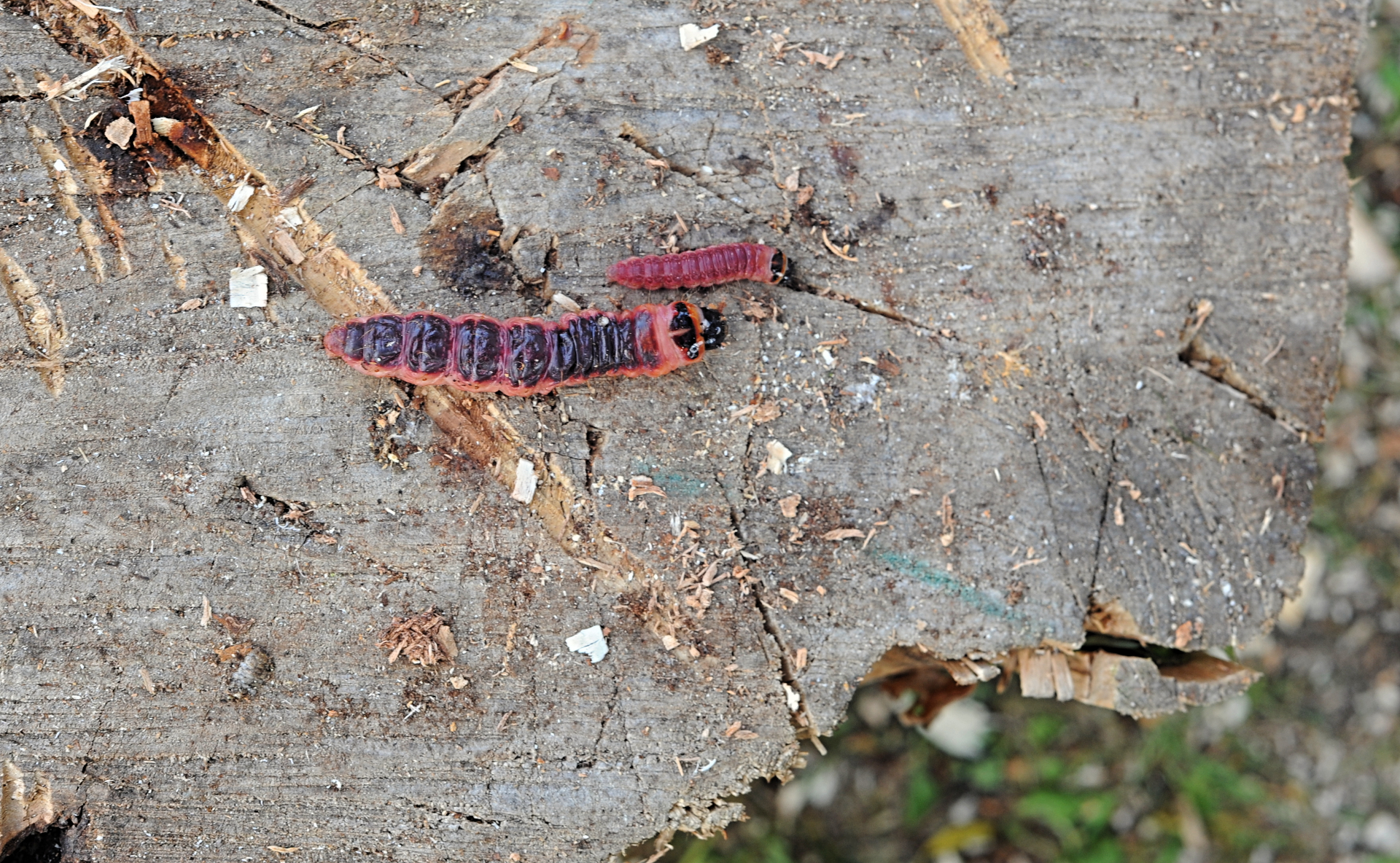
Caterpillars of different age on willow wood

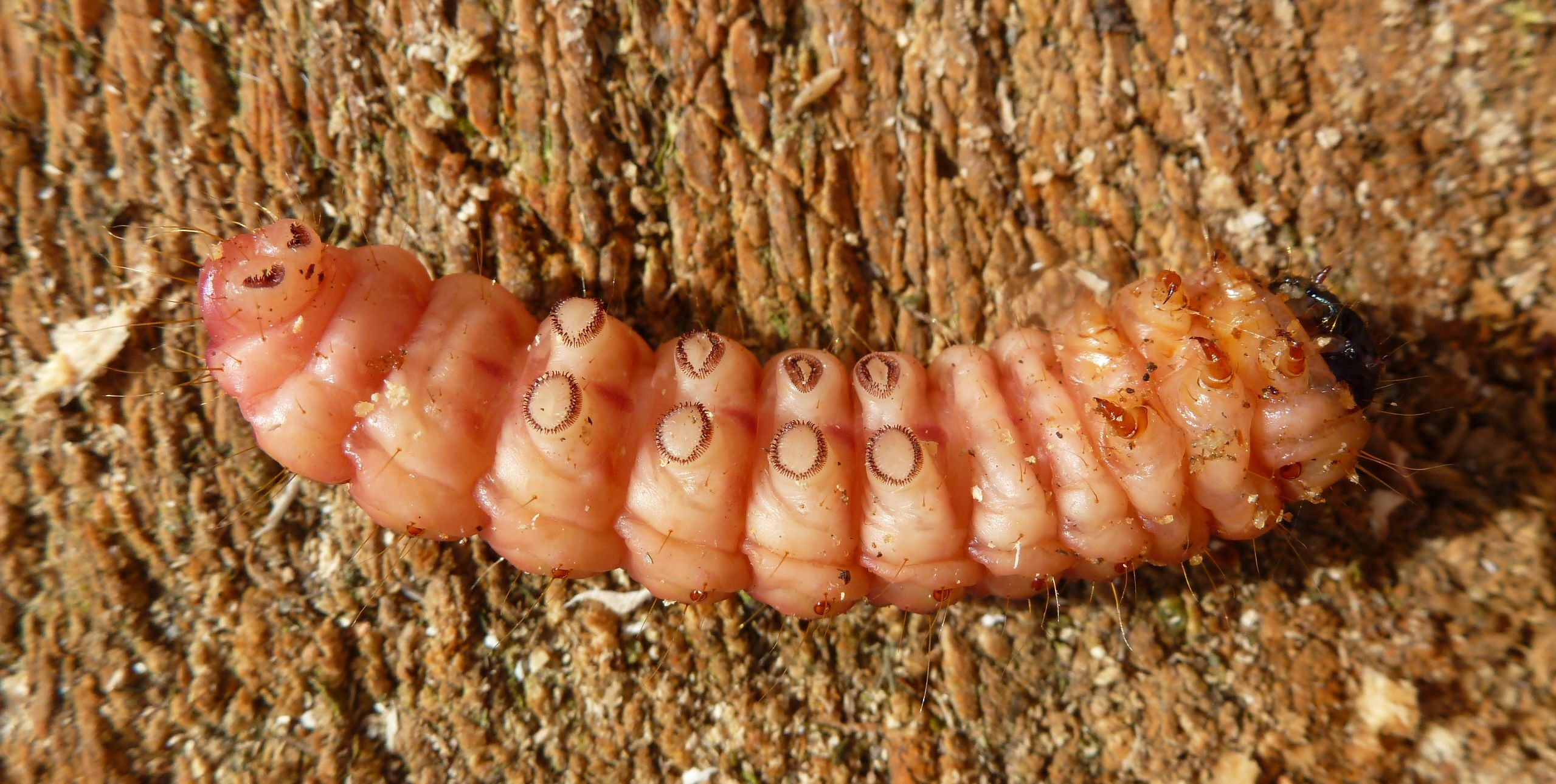
Caterpillar (underside; head to the right)

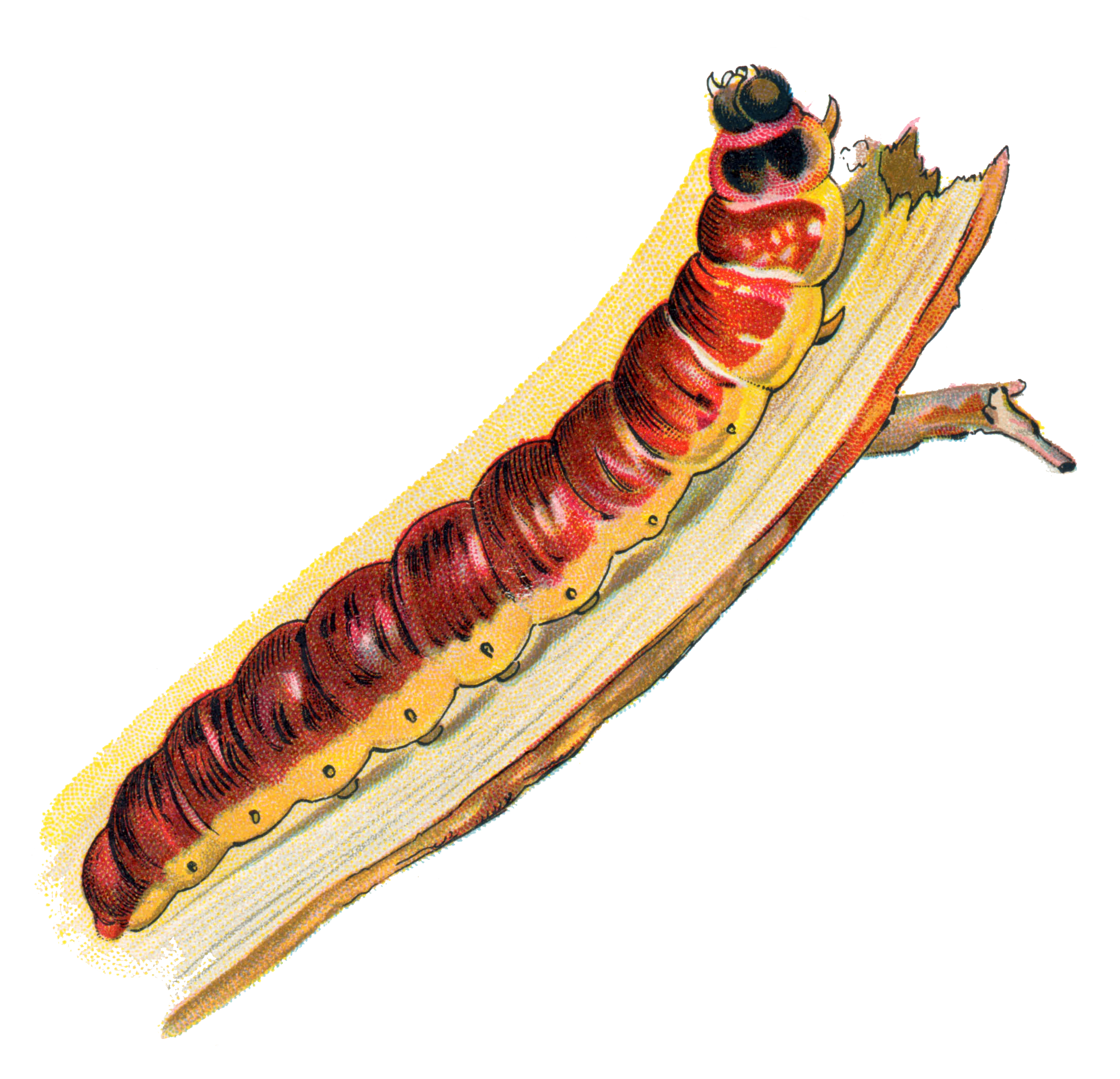
Illustrated caterpillar

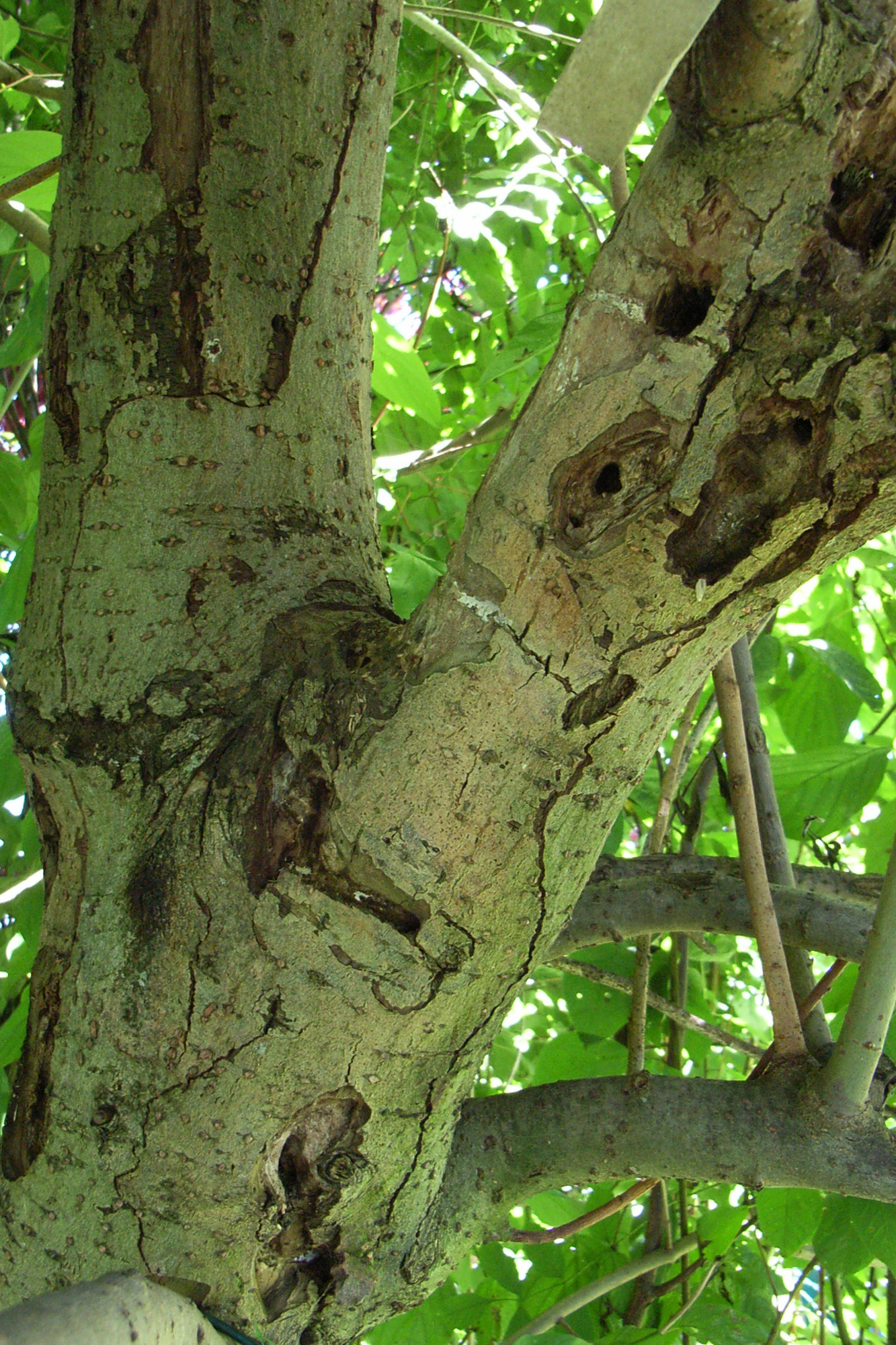
Willow with caterpillars

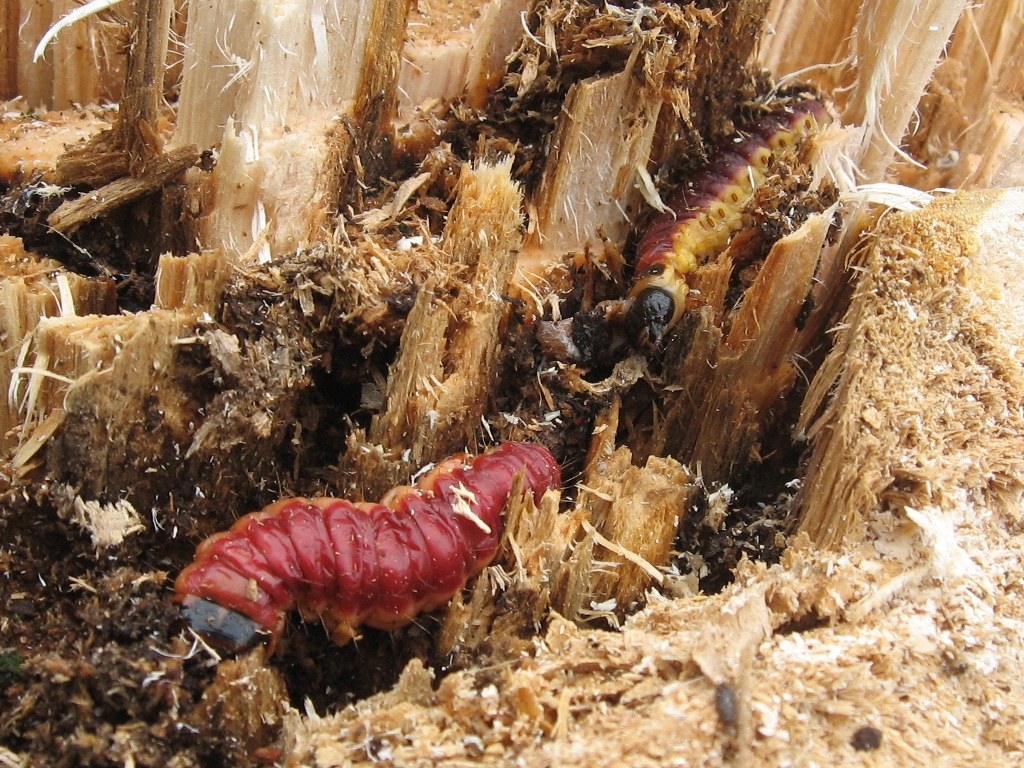
Caterpillars

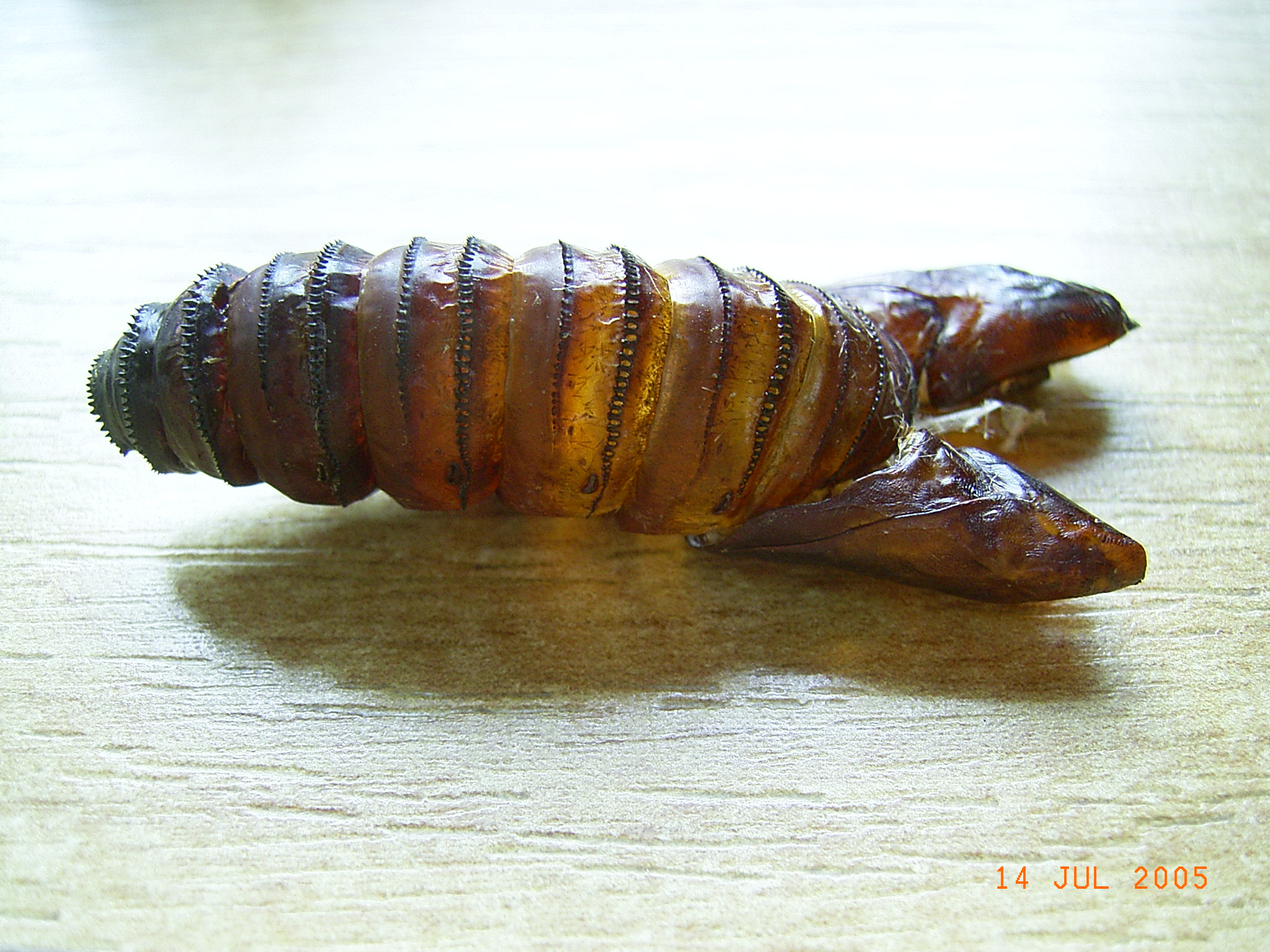
Pupal case

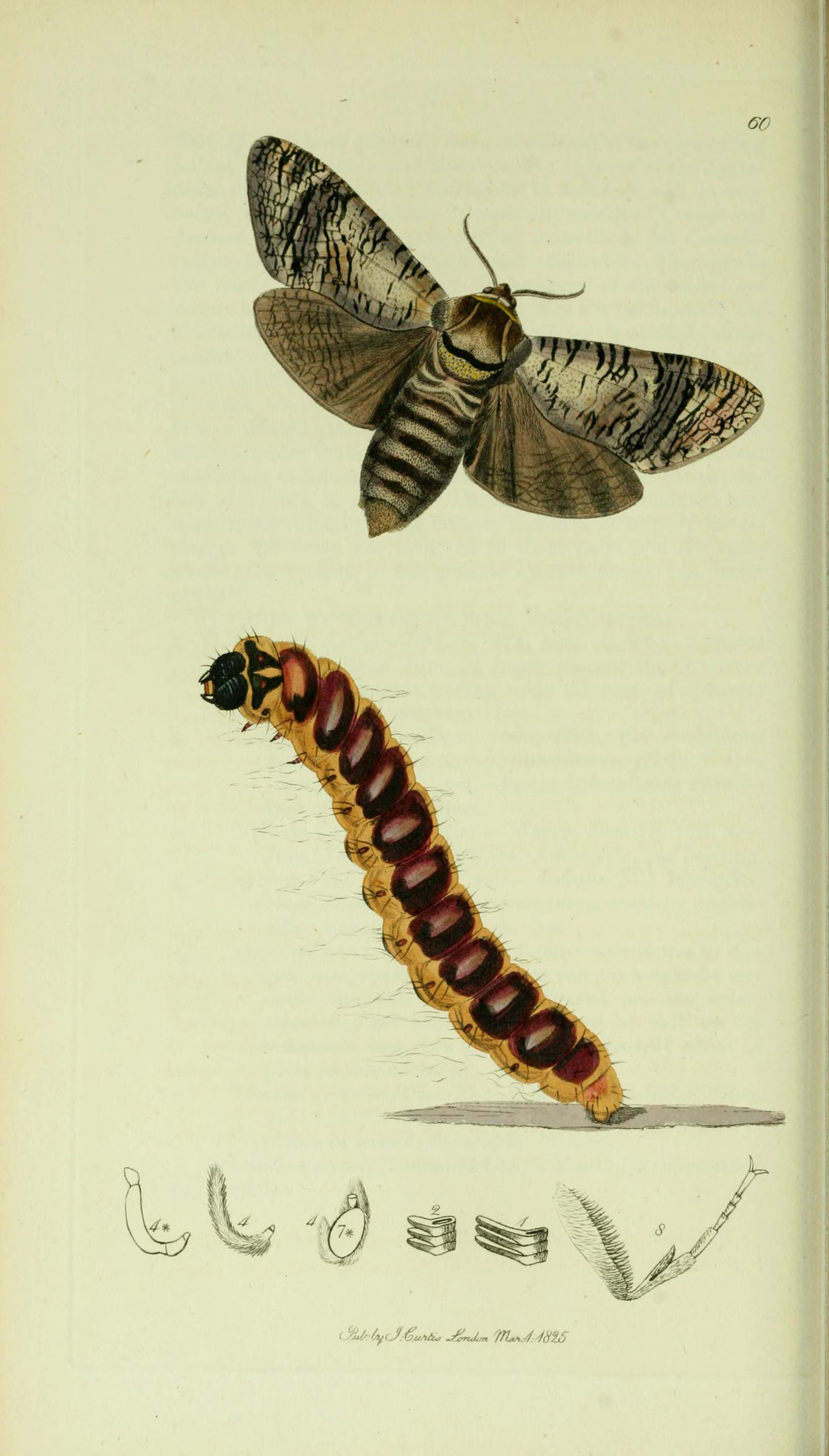
Illustration from John Curtis's British Entomology Volume 5

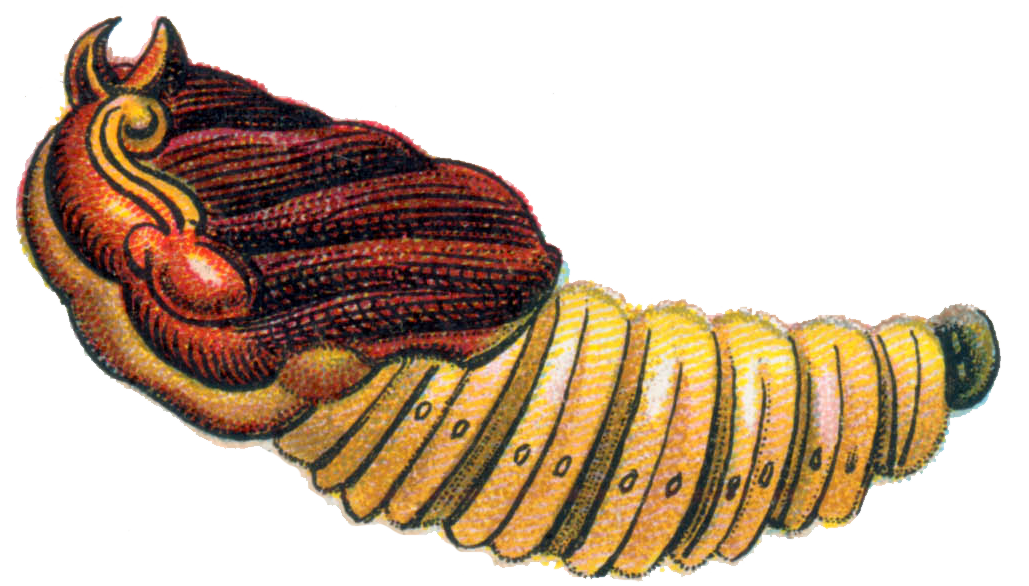
Illustrated pupa

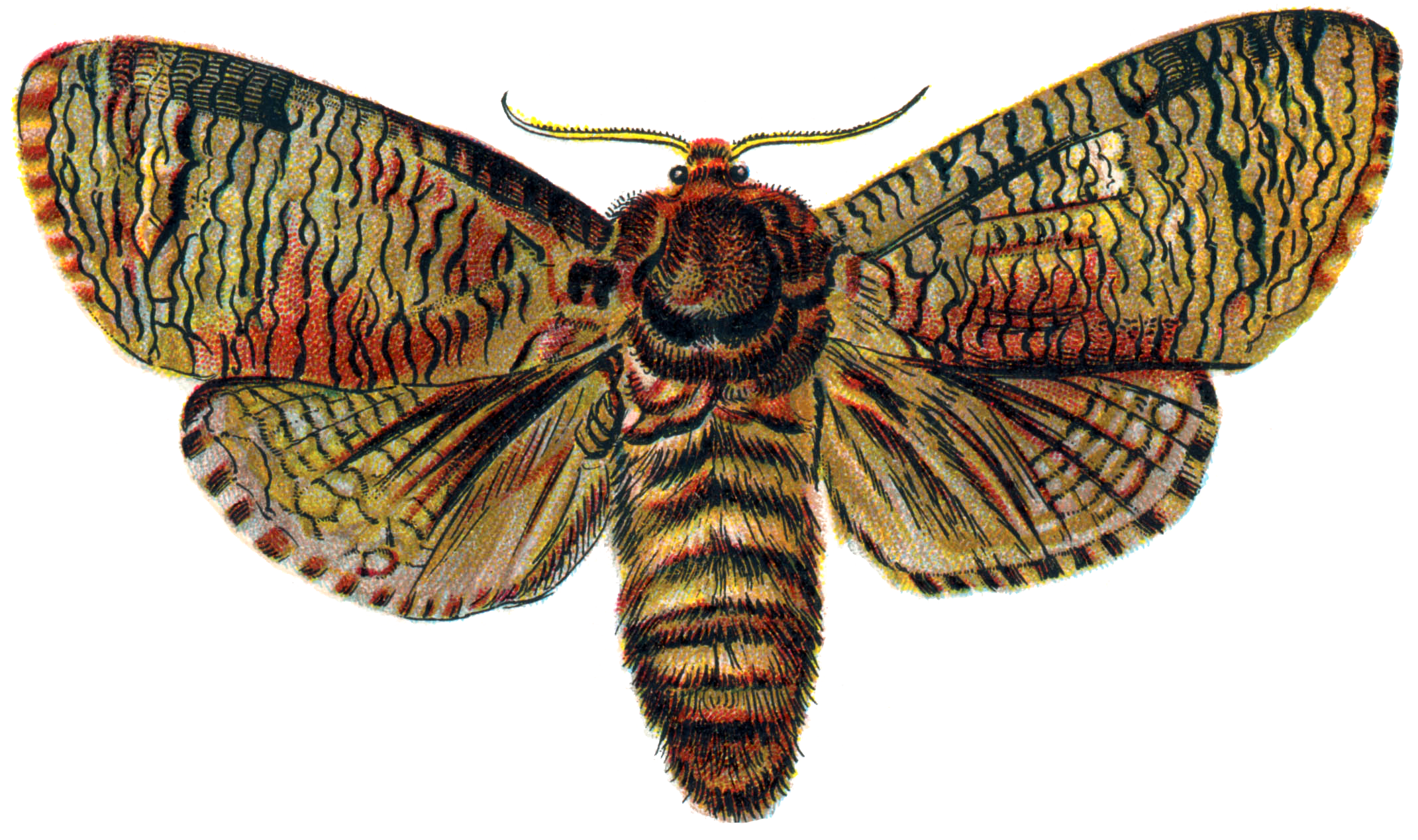
Illustrated adult

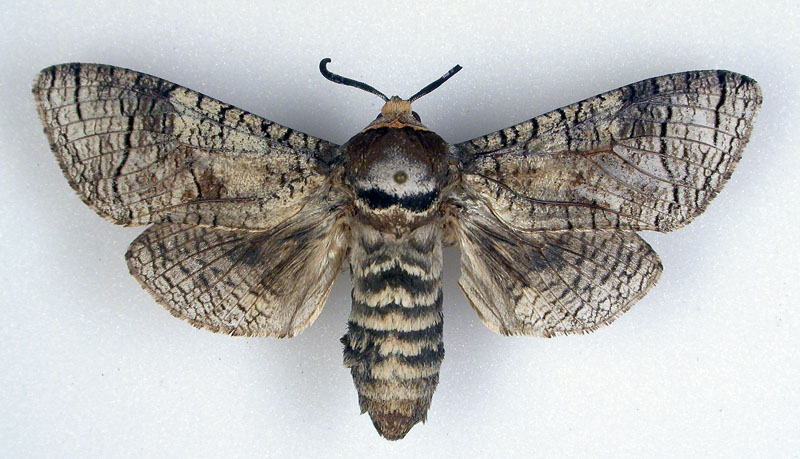
Mounted

Caterpillar
