= Hirtocossus crucis =

Scientific classification
- Domain: Eukaryota
- Kingdom: Animalia
- Phylum: Arthropoda
- Class: Insecta
- Order: Lepidoptera
- Family: Cossidae
- Genus: Hirtocossus
- Species: H. crucis

Binomial name
- Hirtocossus crucis (Kenrick, 1914)

Synonyms
- Cossus crucis Kenrick, 1914

Species of moth

Hirtocossus crucis is a moth of the family Cossidae. It is found in Madagascar.

This is a large heavy moth with a wingspan of 70 mm. The frontwings are dull white, with 2 fine angulated lines crossing, the hindwings are uniformly dull grey.
