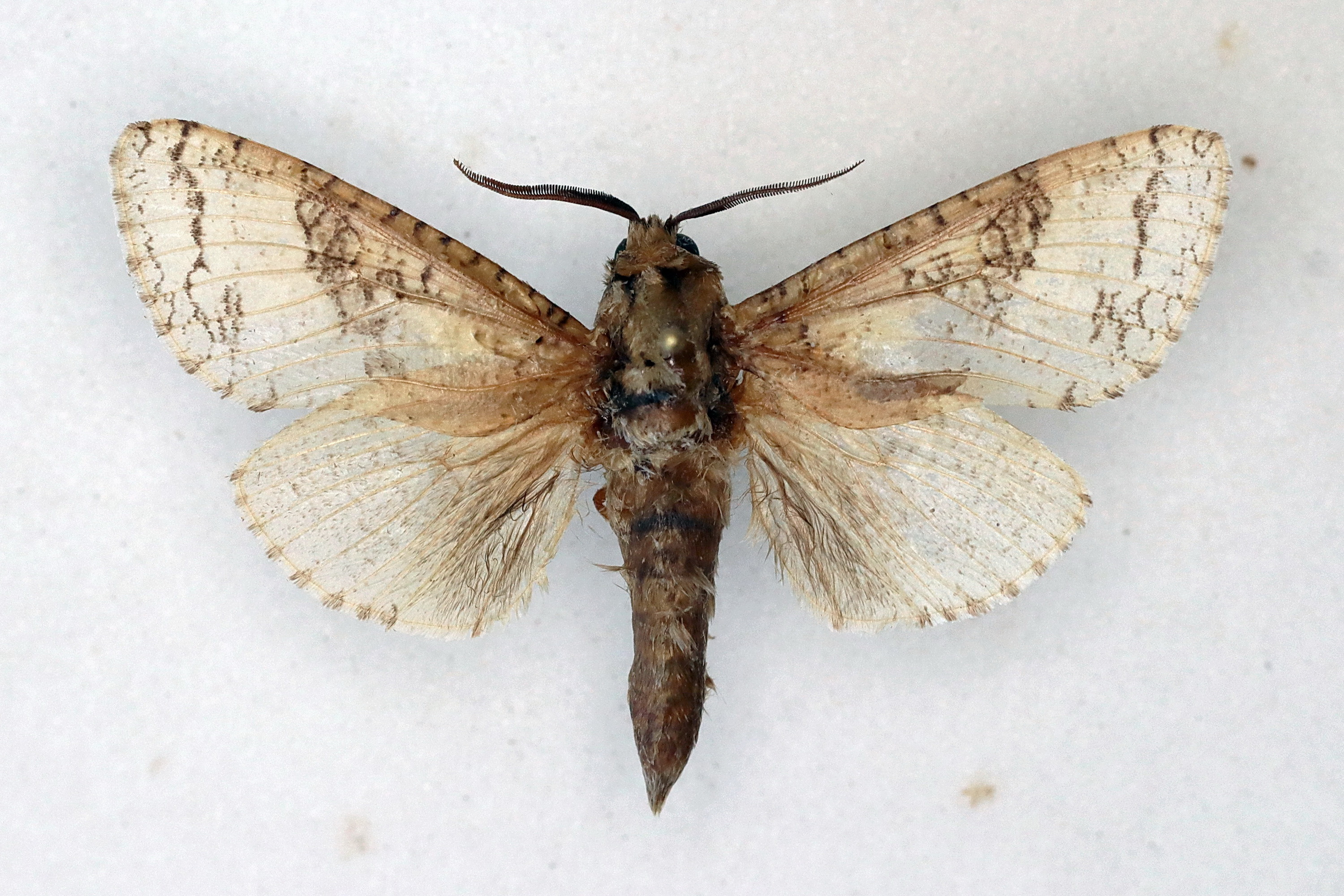

Scientific classification
- Kingdom: Animalia
- Phylum: Arthropoda
- Class: Insecta
- Order: Lepidoptera
- Family: Cossidae
- Genus: Dyspessacossus
- Species: D. fereidun

Binomial name
- Dyspessacossus fereidun (Grum-Grshimailo, 1895)

Synonyms
- Cossus fereidun Grum-Grshimailo, 1895; Cossus osthelderi Daniel, 1932; Holcocerus firdusi Wagner, 1937; Dyspessacossus ahmadi Wiltshire, 1957

= Dyspessacossus fereidun =

Species of moth

Dyspessacossus fereidun is a species of moth of the family Cossidae. It is found in Turkey, Azerbaijan, Armenia, Iraq, Iran, Syria and Israel.

Adults have been recorded on wing in August in Israel.

== Subspecies ==
- Dyspessacossus fereidun fereidun (Armenia, Iraq)
- Dyspessacossus fereidun ahmadi Wiltshire, 1957 (Iraq)
- Dyspessacossus fereidun osthelderi (Daniel, 1932) (Israel)
