= Roerichiora stigmatica =

Scientific classification
- Kingdom: Animalia
- Phylum: Arthropoda
- Class: Insecta
- Order: Lepidoptera
- Family: Cossidae
- Genus: Roerichiora
- Species: R. stigmatica

Binomial name
- Roerichiora stigmatica (Moore, 1879)

Synonyms
- Zeuzera stigmaticus Moore, 1879; Cossus stigmaticus

Species of moth

Roerichiora stigmatica is a moth in the family Cossidae. It is found in India (Darjeeling, Sikkim), Bhutan, Vietnam and Thailand.
