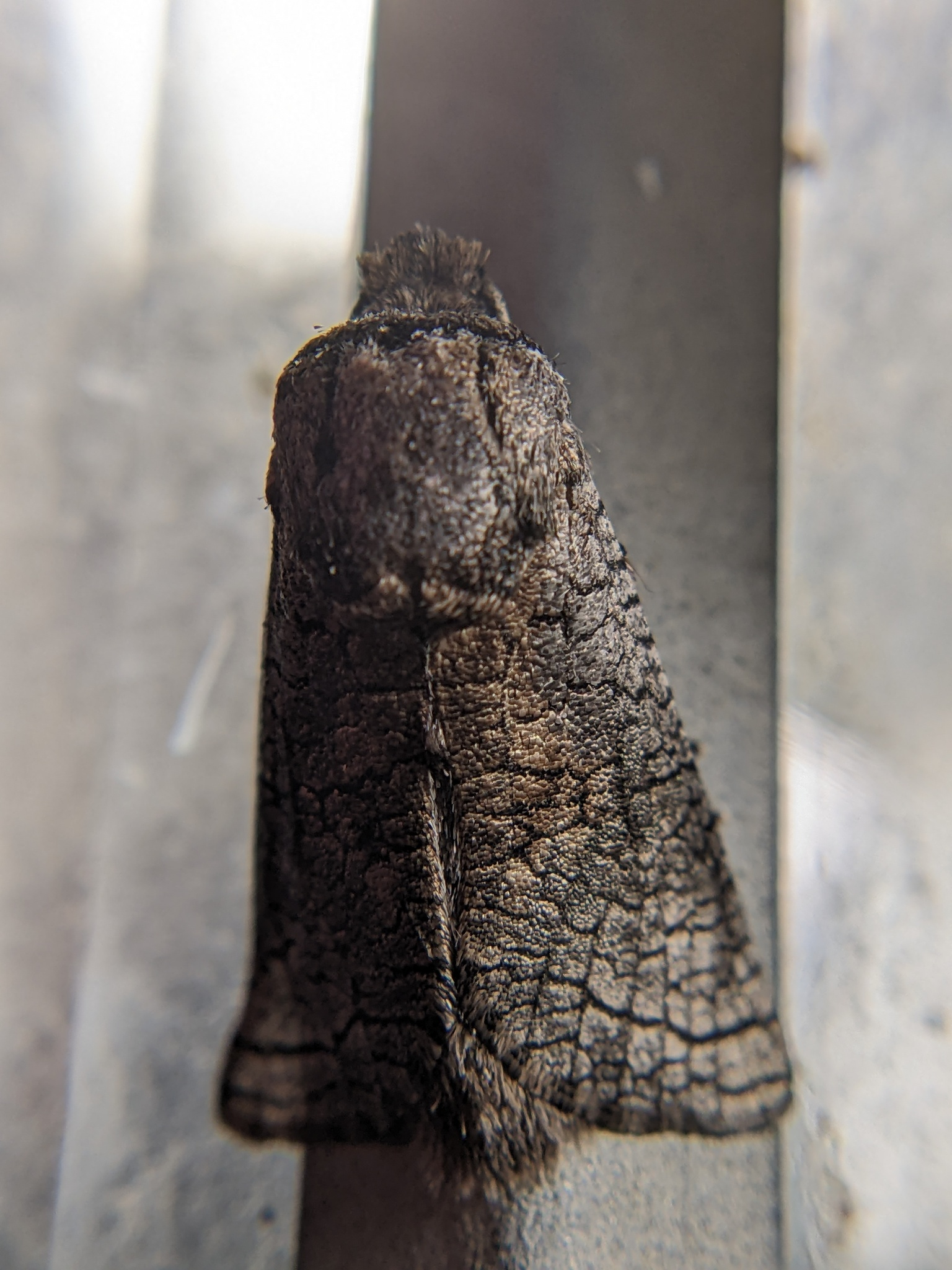

Scientific classification
- Kingdom: Animalia
- Phylum: Arthropoda
- Clade: Pancrustacea
- Class: Insecta
- Order: Lepidoptera
- Family: Blastobasidae
- Genus: Brachylia
- Species: B. windhoekensis

Binomial name
- Brachylia windhoekensis (Strand, 1913)

Synonyms
- Cossus windhoekensis Strand, 1913

= Brachylia windhoekensis =

Species of moth

Brachylia windhoekensis is a species of moth in the family Cossidae. It was first described by Strand in 1913. It is found in Namibia.
