= Planctogystia brevicula =

Scientific classification
- Domain: Eukaryota
- Kingdom: Animalia
- Phylum: Arthropoda
- Class: Insecta
- Order: Lepidoptera
- Family: Cossidae
- Genus: Planctogystia
- Species: P. brevicula

Binomial name
- Planctogystia brevicula (Mabille, 1880)

Synonyms
- Cossus breviculus Mabille, 1880; Planctogystia breviculus

Species of moth

Planctogystia brevicula is a moth in the family Cossidae. It is found in Madagascar.
