= Kotchevnik modestus =

Scientific classification
- Kingdom: Animalia
- Phylum: Arthropoda
- Class: Insecta
- Order: Lepidoptera
- Family: Cossidae
- Genus: Kotchevnik
- Species: K. modestus

Binomial name
- Kotchevnik modestus (Staudinger, 1887)

Synonyms
- Cossus modestus Staudinger, 1887

Species of moth

Kotchevnik modestus is a moth in the family Cossidae. It is found in Turkmenistan.
