= Gobibatyr colossus =

Scientific classification
- Kingdom: Animalia
- Phylum: Arthropoda
- Class: Insecta
- Order: Lepidoptera
- Family: Cossidae
- Genus: Gobibatyr
- Species: G. colossus

Binomial name
- Gobibatyr colossus (Staudinger, 1887)

Synonyms
- Cossus colossus Staudinger, 1887

Species of moth

Gobibatyr colossus is a moth in the family Cossidae. It is found in Mongolia (Tien-Schan).
