= Chinocossus hunanensis =

Scientific classification
- Kingdom: Animalia
- Phylum: Arthropoda
- Clade: Pancrustacea
- Class: Insecta
- Order: Lepidoptera
- Family: Cossidae
- Genus: Chinocossus
- Species: C. hunanensis

Binomial name
- Chinocossus hunanensis (Daniel, 1940)

Synonyms
- Cossus hunanensis Daniel, 1940

Species of moth

Chinocossus hunanensis is a moth in the family Cossidae. It is found in China (Hunan).
