= Planctogystia senex =

Scientific classification
- Domain: Eukaryota
- Kingdom: Animalia
- Phylum: Arthropoda
- Class: Insecta
- Order: Lepidoptera
- Family: Cossidae
- Genus: Planctogystia
- Species: P. senex

Binomial name
- Planctogystia senex (Butler, 1882)

Synonyms
- Cossus senex Butler, 1882

Species of moth

Planctogystia senex is a moth in the family Cossidae. It is found in Madagascar.
