= Wittocossus mokanshanensis =

Scientific classification
- Domain: Eukaryota
- Kingdom: Animalia
- Phylum: Arthropoda
- Class: Insecta
- Order: Lepidoptera
- Family: Cossidae
- Genus: Wittocossus
- Species: W. mokanshanensis

Binomial name
- Wittocossus mokanshanensis (Daniel, 1945)

Synonyms
- Cossus mokanshanensis Daniel, 1945; Cossus yunnanensis Hua, Chou, Fang & Chen, 1990; Cossus moganshanensis Hua, Chou, Fang & Chen, 1990

Species of moth

Wittocossus mokanshanensis is a moth in the family Cossidae. It was described by Franz Daniel in 1945. It is found in China (Zhejiang, Yunnan, Hubei, Sichuan), Thailand and Vietnam.

The length of the forewings is 26–28 mm.
