= Roepkiella nigromaculata =

Scientific classification
- Kingdom: Animalia
- Phylum: Arthropoda
- Class: Insecta
- Order: Lepidoptera
- Family: Cossidae
- Genus: Roepkiella
- Species: R. nigromaculata

Binomial name
- Roepkiella nigromaculata (Hampson, 1892)

Synonyms
- Cossus nigromaculatus Hampson, 1892

Species of moth

Roepkiella nigromaculata is a moth in the family Cossidae. It is found in India.
