= Aholcocerus verbeeki =

Scientific classification
- Kingdom: Animalia
- Phylum: Arthropoda
- Class: Insecta
- Order: Lepidoptera
- Family: Cossidae
- Genus: Aholcocerus
- Species: A. verbeeki

Binomial name
- Aholcocerus verbeeki (Roepke, 1957)

Synonyms
- Cossus verbeeki Roepke, 1957; Holcocerus verbeeki

Species of moth

Aholcocerus verbeeki is a moth in the family Cossidae. It is found on Java.
