= Roepkiella pusillus =

Scientific classification
- Domain: Eukaryota
- Kingdom: Animalia
- Phylum: Arthropoda
- Class: Insecta
- Order: Lepidoptera
- Family: Cossidae
- Genus: Roepkiella
- Species: R. pusillus

Binomial name
- Roepkiella pusillus (Roepke, 1957)

Synonyms
- Cossus pusillus Roepke, 1957; Paracossus pusillus

Species of moth

Roepkiella pusillus is a moth in the family Cossidae. It is found in western Java.
