= Roepkiella chloratus =

Scientific classification
- Domain: Eukaryota
- Kingdom: Animalia
- Phylum: Arthropoda
- Class: Insecta
- Order: Lepidoptera
- Family: Cossidae
- Genus: Roepkiella
- Species: R. chloratus

Binomial name
- Roepkiella chloratus (C. Swinhoe, 1892)

Synonyms
- Cossus chloratus C. Swinhoe, 1892; Paracossus chloratus; Cossus divisa Rothschild, 1912

Species of moth

Roepkiella chloratus is a moth in the family Cossidae first described by Charles Swinhoe in 1892.

It is found in Sundaland and the Philippines. Its habitat consists of lowland rainforests.

Its larvae burrows in the bark of the Parkia species.
