= Roepkiella rufidorsia =

Scientific classification
- Kingdom: Animalia
- Phylum: Arthropoda
- Class: Insecta
- Order: Lepidoptera
- Family: Cossidae
- Genus: Roepkiella
- Species: R. rufidorsia

Binomial name
- Roepkiella rufidorsia (Hampson, 1905)

Synonyms
- Cossus rufidorsia Hampson, 1905; Paracossus rufidorsia

Species of moth

Roepkiella rufidorsia is a moth in the family Cossidae. It is found in India (Sikkim).
