= Eremocossus vaulogeri =

Scientific classification
- Kingdom: Animalia
- Phylum: Arthropoda
- Class: Insecta
- Order: Lepidoptera
- Family: Cossidae
- Genus: Eremocossus
- Species: E. vaulogeri

Binomial name
- Eremocossus vaulogeri (Staudinger, 1897)

Synonyms
- Hypopta vaulogeri Staudinger, 1897; Hypopta jordana Staudinger, 1897; Eremocossus baloutchistanensis Daniel, 1949; Cossus saharae Lucas, 1907; Endagria jordana var. suavis Staudinger, 1899; Dyspessa intermedia Krüger, 1939; Dyspessa jordana maxima Turati, 1927; Dyspessa (Holcocerus) bianchii Krüger, 1934; Dyspessa hartigi Rebel, 1935; Eremocossus vaulogeri blanca Daniel, 1949; Eremocossus senegalensis Le Cerf, 1919; Holcocerus baloutchistanensis Daniel, 1949; Hypopta vaulogeri meirleirei Rungs, 1951; Hypopta vaulogeri blanca Daniel, 1949

Species of moth

Eremocossus vaulogeri is a species of moth of the family Cossidae. It is found in Senegal, Mauritania, Morocco, Algeria, Libya, Tunisia, Egypt, Jordan, Israel, Syria, Egypt, Oman, Yemen, the United Arab Emirates, Saudi Arabia, Iraq and southern Iran.

Adults have been recorded on wing in April and December in Israel.

== Subspecies ==
- Eremocossus vaulogeri vaulogeri (Egypt, Algeria, Libya, Tunisia)
- Eremocossus vaulogeri blanca (Daniel, 1949) (Iran: Baloutchistan)
- Eremocossus vaulogeri erebuni Yakovlev, 2008 (Armenia)
- Eremocossus vaulogeri jordana (Staudinger, 1897) (Israel, Jordan, Syria, Egypt, Oman, Saudi Arabia, United Arab Emirates, Yemen)
- Eremocossus vaulogeri meirleirei (Rungs, 1951) (Morocco)
- Eremocossus vaulogeri senegalensis Le Cerf, 1919 (Mauritania, Senegal)
