= Roepkiella celebensis =

Scientific classification
- Domain: Eukaryota
- Kingdom: Animalia
- Phylum: Arthropoda
- Class: Insecta
- Order: Lepidoptera
- Family: Cossidae
- Genus: Roepkiella
- Species: R. celebensis

Binomial name
- Roepkiella celebensis (Roepke, 1957)

Synonyms
- Cossus celebensis Roepke, 1957; Paracossus celebensis

Species of moth

Roepkiella celebensis is a moth in the family Cossidae. It is found on Sulawesi.
