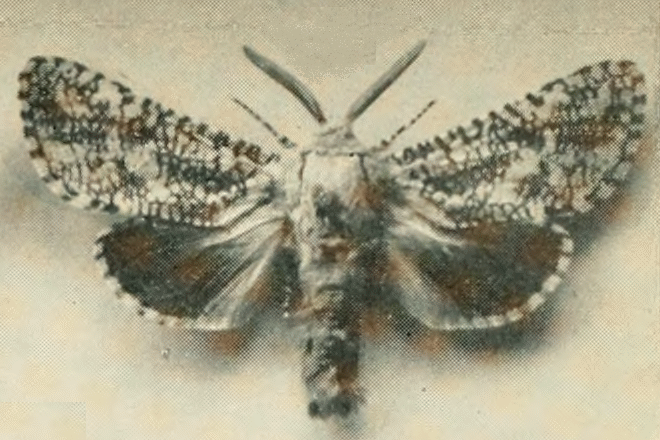

Scientific classification
- Domain: Eukaryota
- Kingdom: Animalia
- Phylum: Arthropoda
- Class: Insecta
- Order: Lepidoptera
- Family: Cossidae
- Subfamily: Cossinae
- Tribe: Cossini
- Genus: Wiltshirocossus
- Species: W. aries

Binomial name
- Wiltshirocossus aries (Püngeler, 1902)

Synonyms
- Cossus aries Püngeler, 1902; Cossus bongiovannii Krüger, 1939; Cossus pulcher Rungs, 1942; Cossus tahlai Dumont, 1932; Cossus turatii Krüger, 1934; Wiltshirocossus aegyptiaca (Hampson, 1910); Wiltshirocossus bongiovannii (Krüger, 1939); Wiltshirocossus pulcher (Rungs, 1943); Wiltshirocossus tahlai (Dumont, 1932); Wiltshirocossus turatii (Krüger, 1934)

= Wiltshirocossus aries =

Species of moth

Wiltshirocossus aries is a species of moth of the family Cossidae. It is found in southern Spain, on the Canary Islands, as well as in Mauritania, Israel, Saudi Arabia, Bahrain, the United Arab Emirates, Yemen, Oman, Algeria, Tunisia and Egypt. The habitat consists of deserts and semidesert areas.

The wingspan is about 39 mm. The ground colour of the forewings is white, with brownish suffusion. The hindwings are shining greyish black. Adults are on wing from February to April in North Africa and from April to May in Spain.

The larvae feed on Acacia species.

== Subspecies ==
- Wiltshirocossus aries aries
- Wiltshirocossus aries aegyptiaca (Hampson, 1910) (Egypt)
- Wiltshirocossus aries cheesmani (Tams, 1925) (Saudi Arabia, Bahrain)
