= Chinocossus acronyctoides =

Scientific classification
- Domain: Eukaryota
- Kingdom: Animalia
- Phylum: Arthropoda
- Class: Insecta
- Order: Lepidoptera
- Family: Cossidae
- Genus: Chinocossus
- Species: C. acronyctoides

Binomial name
- Chinocossus acronyctoides (Moore, 1879)

Synonyms
- Brachylia acronyctoides Moore, 1879; Cossus acronyctoides; Paracossus acronyctoides

Species of moth

Chinocossus acronyctoides is a moth in the family Cossidae. It is found in Kashmir, India and Vietnam.

The larvae feed on Tamarix articulata.
