= Paracossus =

Scientific classification
- Kingdom: Animalia
- Phylum: Arthropoda
- Class: Insecta
- Order: Lepidoptera
- Family: Cossidae
- Subfamily: Cossinae
- Genus: Paracossus; Hampson, 1904

Synonyms
- Bifiduncus I. Chou & B.Z. Hua, 1988

Genus of moths

Paracossus is a genus of moths in the family Cossidae.

== Species ==
- Paracossus furcatus Hampson, 1904
- Paracossus griseatus Yakovlev, 2009
- Paracossus hainanicus Yakovlev, 2009
- Paracossus indradit Yakovlev, 2009
- Paracossus longispinalis (I. Chou & B.Z. Hua, 1988)
- Paracossus parvus Hampson, 1905
- Paracossus zyaung Yakovlev, 2014

== Former species ==
- Paracossus acronyctoides (Moore, 1879)
- Paracossus amasonca Yakovlev, 2006
- Paracossus artushka Yakovlev, 2006
- Paracossus celebensis
- Paracossus chloratus (Swinhoe, 1892)
- Paracossus cinereus (Roepke, 1957)
- Paracossus javanus
- Paracossus khmer Yakovlev, 2004
- Paracossus loeffleri
- Paracossus microgenitalis Yakovlev, 2004
- Paracossus pinratanai Yakovlev, 2004
- Paracossus pusillus (Roepke, 1957)
- Paracossus rama Yakovlev, 2006
- Paracossus retak (Holloway, 1986)
- Paracossus rufidorsia (Hampson, 1905)
- Paracossus schoorli Yakovlev, 2004
- Paracossus seria (Holloway, 1986)
- Paracossus speideli (Holloway, 1986)
- Paracossus subfuscus
- Paracossus telisai (Holloway, 1986)
- Paracossus thaika Yakovlev, 2006
- Paracossus xishuangbannaensis (Chou et Hua, 1986)
