= Yakovlev AIR-3 =

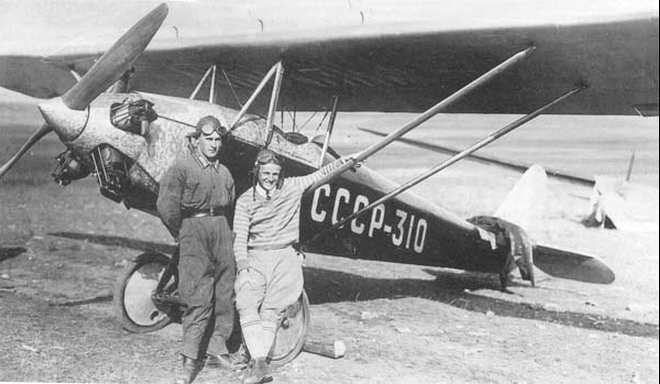
- D.A Koshits (r) and his mechanic B.N. Podlensky in front of their AIR-3

General information
- Type: Two-seat monoplane
- National origin: Soviet Union
- Manufacturer: Yakovlev
- Designer: Aleksandr Sergeyevich Yakovlev
- Number built: (AIR-3) 1, (AIR-4) 5, (AIR-8) 1

History
- First flight: (AIR-3) 17 August 1929 (AIR-4) September 1930, (AIR-8) 1934
- Developed from: Yakovlev AIR-2

The Yakovlev AIR-3 was a 1920s Soviet two-seat general aviation monoplane designed and built by Aleksandr Sergeyevich Yakovlev.

== Development ==
Following his design of the earlier AIR-1 and AIR-2, Yakovlev was taken on as a student at the Nikolai Zhukovsky Air Force Engineering Academy, where he designed the AIR-3, which was similar to the earlier AIR-2 biplane but with a strut-braced high parasol wing. Powered by a 60 hp (45 kW) Walter NZ-60 radial piston engine, the AIR-3 was also known as Pionerskaya Pravda after the Pionerskaya Pravda, a young-communist newspaper, which had raised funds for the construction from its readership. On 6 September 1929 the aircraft was flown non-stop between Mineralnye Vody and Moscow, a distance of 1835 km, achieving two light aircraft world records.

In 1930 the design was refined as the Yakovlev AIR-4 with a new split-axle landing gear, wider cockpits fitted with entrance doors and extra fuel.

One AIR-4 was modified as the Yakovlev AIR-4MK in 1933 to test nearly full-span split flaps. Floating wingtips, which provided roll control, were added to release as much trailing edge as possible for the flaps.

A military liaison variant of the AIR-4, the Yakovlev AIR-8, was also produced in 1934, fitted with an 85 hp (63 kW) Siemens engine and constant chord wings of greater area.

== Kozlov PS ==
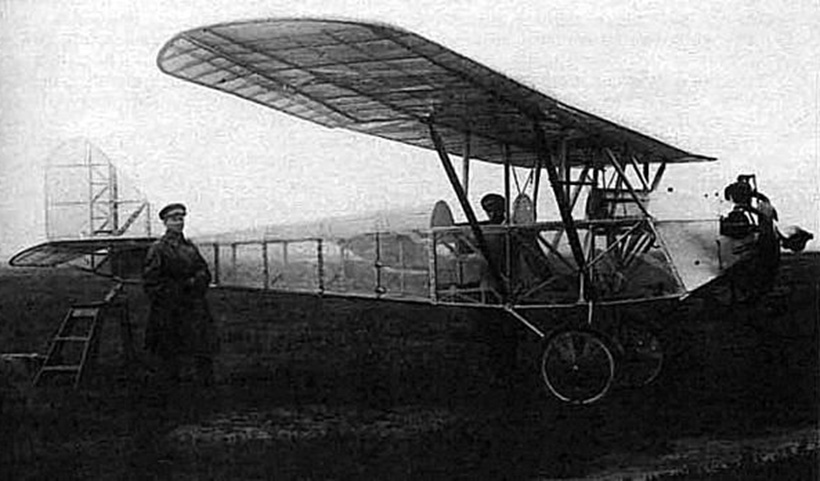
The Kozlov PS (invisible airplane)

After a preliminary experiment using a Polikarpov U-2, Professor Sergei Grigorevich Kozlov, of the Nikolai Zhukovsky Air Force Engineering Academy, modified a Yakovlev AIR-4, in 1935, to produce the Kozlov PS (Prozrachnyy Samolyot — transparent aircraft). Fabric covering on the fuselage and wings was replaced with a transparent plastic material, called ''Cellon'' or ''Rhodoid'', and the opaque structure was painted with a white paint mixed with aluminium powder. Trials with ground and airborne observations confirmed Kozlov's theories, with the bonus of excellent visibility for the crew. After the initial success, the film was found to become opaque through dirt collection and the effects of the sun, diminishing the ''invisibility effect''.

Kozlov proposed an invisible single-seat reconnaissance aircraft using the transparent plastic material, but doubts about structural strength of the material precluded development. Further studies into transparent aircraft were ordered from the experimental institute headed by Pyotr I. Grokhovskii but no more transparent aircraft were built using Kozlov's methods.

== Variants ==
=== AIR-3 ===
Two-seat monoplane with a 60 hp (45 kW) Walter NZ-60 radial piston engine developed from the Yakovlev AIR-2. Only one AIR-3 was built.

=== AIR-4 ===
Improved variant fitted with increased fuel capacity and modified landing gear. At least five AIR-4 aircraft were built.

=== AIR-4MK ===
(MK – Mekhanizeerovannoye Krylo — mechanised wings). For research into high lift systems for approach control, a single AIR-4 (regn. CCCP-E-31) was modified with full-span split flaps, with floating wingtips rotating around transverse axles for roll control.

=== E-31 ===
An alternative designation for the AIR-4MK taken from the registration.

=== Kozlov PS ===
A single AIR-4 was modified by Sergei G. Kozlov to demonstrate his theory on low-visibility aircraft, making it in effect an early stealth aircraft. Covered with a transparent plastic sheeting and with the interior structure and opaque parts painted silver, the PS was found to be very difficult to see at first, but accumulation of dirt and the sheeting turning opaque diminished the effect fairly rapidly.

=== AIR-8 ===
Military liaison variant with an 85 hp (63 kW) Siemens engine, fitted with a constant chord wing with greater area. One AIR-8 was built.

== Specifications (AIR-3) ==
Data from The History of Soviet Aircraft from 1918

General characteristics

- Crew: two
- Length: 11 m (36 ft 1 in)
- Wingspan: 7.1 m (23 ft 3 in)
- Wing area: 16.5 m^{2} (178 sq ft)
- Empty weight: 392 kg (864 lb)
- Gross weight: 587 kg (1,294 lb)
- Powerplant: 1 × Walter NZ-60 radial piston engine , 45 kW (60 hp)

Performance

- Maximum speed: 146 km/h (91 mph, 79 kn)
- Range: 1,835 km (1,144 mi, 994 nmi)
- Service ceiling: 4,200 m (13,776 ft)
