= Smolensk Aviation Plant =

Russian aircraft production and servicing company

Coordinates: 54.819°N 32.044°E

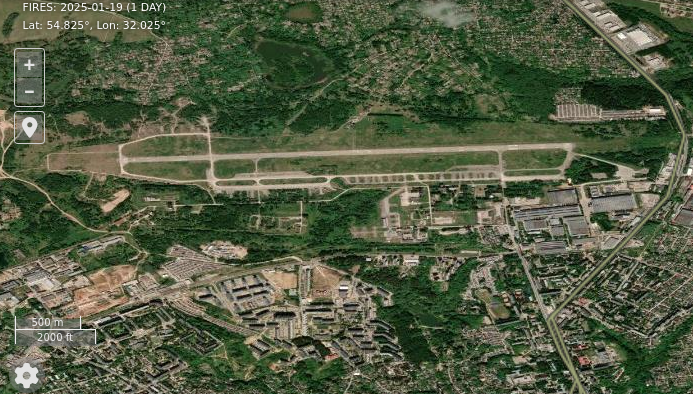
- Satellite imagery of the plant southeast of the runway
- Company type: Open joint-stock company
- Industry: Aviation
- Headquarters: Smolensk, Russia
- Parent: Tactical Missiles Corporation
- Website: smaz.ru

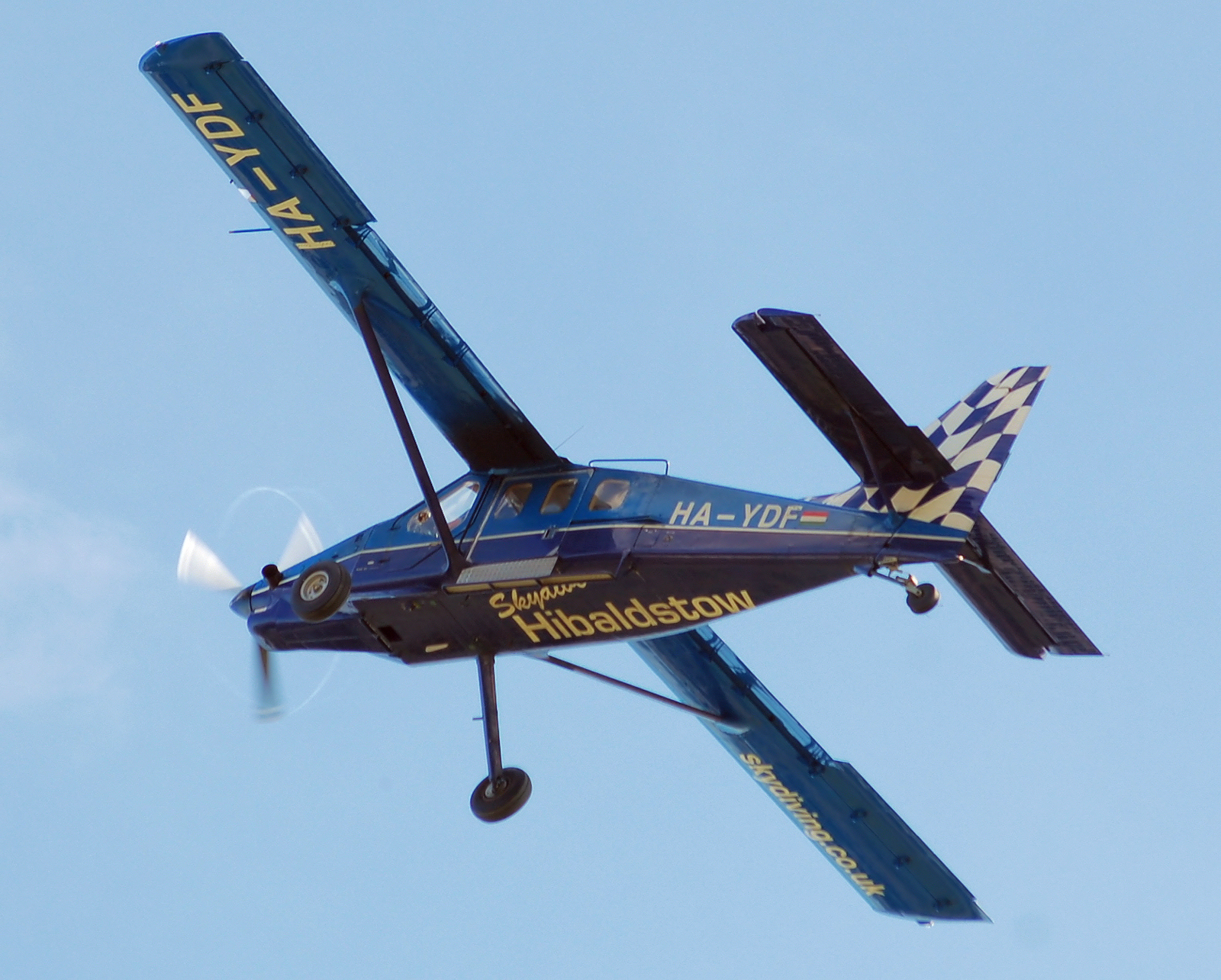
Technoavia SM92 Finist of Target Skysports lifts skydivers to the jump altitude at Hibaldstow, England

The Smolensk Aviation Plant (SmAZ) is a Russian aircraft production and servicing company. Founded in 1926, since 1993 it has been a Joint stock company. It is located southeast of the Smolensk North Airport.

== History ==
The facility was founded in 1926 as "Aviation Repair Plant No.3", in 1928 it was redesignated "Plant No.35". Between 1941 and 1944 it was relocated to Kuybyshev as part of "Plant #1". Until 1966, it was known as "Plant #475" of the NKAP (Narodny Kommissariat Aviatsionnoy Promyshlennosti, People's Commissariat for Aviation Industry). It was renamed again in 1967 as the "Smolensk Machine Building Plant" of MAP (Ministerstvo Aviatsionnoy Promyshlennosti, Ministry for the Aviation Industry). It received its present name in 1974.

During the 1960s and 1970s SmAZ primarily produced aircraft and aircraft parts designed by the Yakovlev Design Bureau. During the 1980s production at Smolensk included the Myasishchev-designed high-altitude M-55 Geofizika aircraft, cruise missiles like the Kh-55 Granat and parts for the Buran space shuttle. In addition, SmAZ produces medical and light industry equipment. On July 1, 1993 it was privatized, and has since operated as a joint stock company.

In October and November 2023, the plant was attacked by aerial drones as part of the Russo-Ukrainian War. In January 2025 the plant was again attacked by Ukrainian drones. Seven explosions were reported and air defence was activated according to locals.

== Operation ==
On May 26, 2009, a joint Russian-Czech company CONSUL GROUP OF COMPANIES S.R.O was established with the participation of the company Orbis Avia, Czech (SM92 Finist aircraft production).

For constant participation in International Aviation and Space Show (MAKS) in 2013 JSC "SmAZ" was awarded the diploma and the jubilee medal "MAKS 20 years".

The company continues to work on the development of small aircraft and ensuring the state defense order.

== List of production/serviced aircraft ==
- Grigorovich I-2 (full name was I-7(I-2)) I-2 page
- Polikarpov R-1, I-3, R-5, Po-2, I-15, I-16
- Tupolev TB-1/ANT-4, R-6/ANT-7, SB/ANT-40
- Bureau of Special Developments (БОК) of Chizhevski BOK-1 (stratospheric), BOK-5 (flying wing), BOK-7 (high altitude), BOK-15 (record setting)
- Ilyushin Il-2
- Lavochkin La-5, La-7
- cruise missiles like Kh-55
- Yakovlev Yak-3, Yak-7, Yak-9, Yak-11, Yak-18T, Yak-42, Yak-112
- Bakshaev A-2, VA-3/48, PM gliders
- Myasishchev M-55
- Technoavia SM92 Finist, SM-94-1, SM-2000, SP-55M
- Sukhoi Su-38

== Famous employees ==
In 1956-1985 Hero of Socialist Labour Anatoly Romanov Denisovich (a plumber) worked at the factory.
