= Yakovlev UT-2 =

Soviet trainer aircraft

UT-2
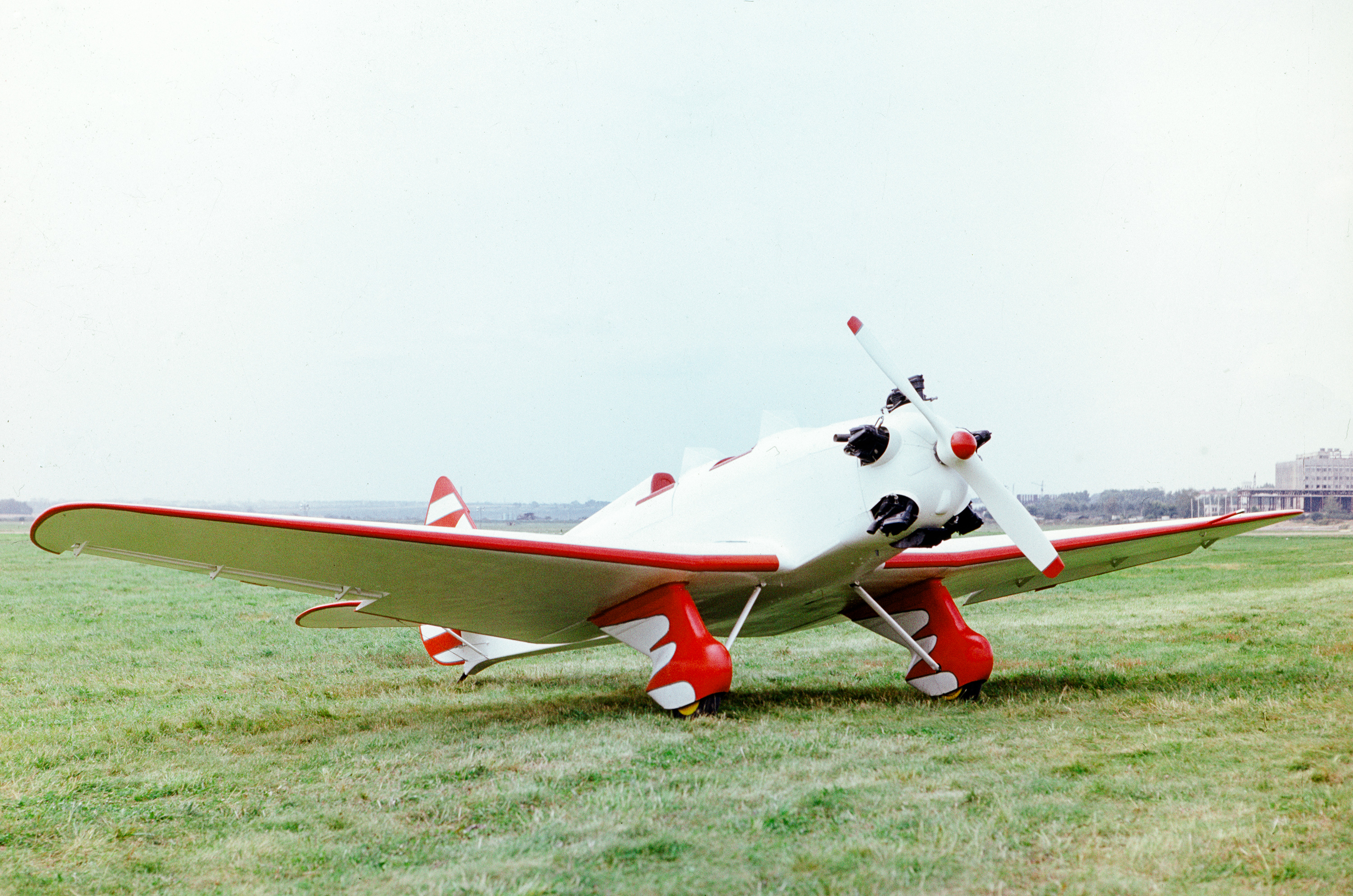
- UT-2, 1978

General information
- Type: Trainer
- National origin: USSR
- Manufacturer: Yakovlev
- Designer: Aleksandr Sergeyevich Yakovlev
- Status: retired (at least one flyable today)
- Primary user: Soviet Air Forces
- Number built: 7,243

History
- Manufactured: 1936 to 1948
- Introduction date: 1937
- First flight: 1935
- Developed from: AIR-10, Ya-20
- Variant: Yakovlev Yak-5

The Yakovlev UT-2 (Russian: Яковлев УТ-2; NATO reporting name "Mink") is a single-engine tandem two-seat low-wing monoplane that was the standard Soviet trainer during World War II. It was used by the Soviet Air Force from 1937 until replaced by the Yakovlev Yak-18 during the 1950s.

== Development ==
The preceding U-2 (Po-2) biplane was no longer a suitable trainer for the faster modern aircraft entering service, and to fill the role, the UT-2 was designed as a trainer.

The new aircraft was designed by Alexander Sergeevich Yakovlev's team at OKB-115. Originally designated AIR-10, it was based upon the AIR-9, but it was simpler, with tandem open cockpits, also omitting slats and flaps. It first flew on 11 July 1935. The AIR-10 won the competition in 1935 and, after minor changes, was accepted as the standard Soviet Air Force trainer. With the disgrace of Alexey Ivanovich Rykov under whom Yakovlev had been working, the initials AIR were replaced with Ya making what would have been the AIR-20 the Ya-20 (Я-20).

The wood-and-metal mixed construction of the AIR-10 was simplified to use only wood to facilitate production, and the AIR-10s 120 hp Renault inline engine was replaced with the 112 kW (150 hp) Shvetsov M-11E radial on the prototype, and the 82 kW (110 hp) M-11Gs in early production aircraft. Serial production started in September 1937. The Soviet VVS (Air Force) assigned the aircraft the designation UT-2 (uchebno-trenirovochnyi {учебно-тренировочный}, trainer).

The UT-2 was not easy to fly and easily entered into spins. The UT-2 model 1940 featured a lengthened forward fuselage, and a change to the 93 kW (125 hp) M-11D radial to attempt to rectify the problem. Despite improvements, the handling and flight characteristics remained challenging.

To further improve handling and stability, the new UT-2M (modernized) variant was developed in 1941 and it replaced the original UT-2 in production. The wing planform was redesigned, with a swept leading edge and a straight trailing edge, and the vertical stabilizer was enlarged.

7,243 UT-2 of all types were produced in five factories between 1937 and 1946. In the 1950s, the UT-2 was replaced by the Yak-18 primary trainer and the Yak-11 advanced trainer.

Before and after World War II the UT-2 was used by civilian organizations, and after the war, UT-2s were also operated by the Polish and Hungarian Air Forces.

== Variants ==
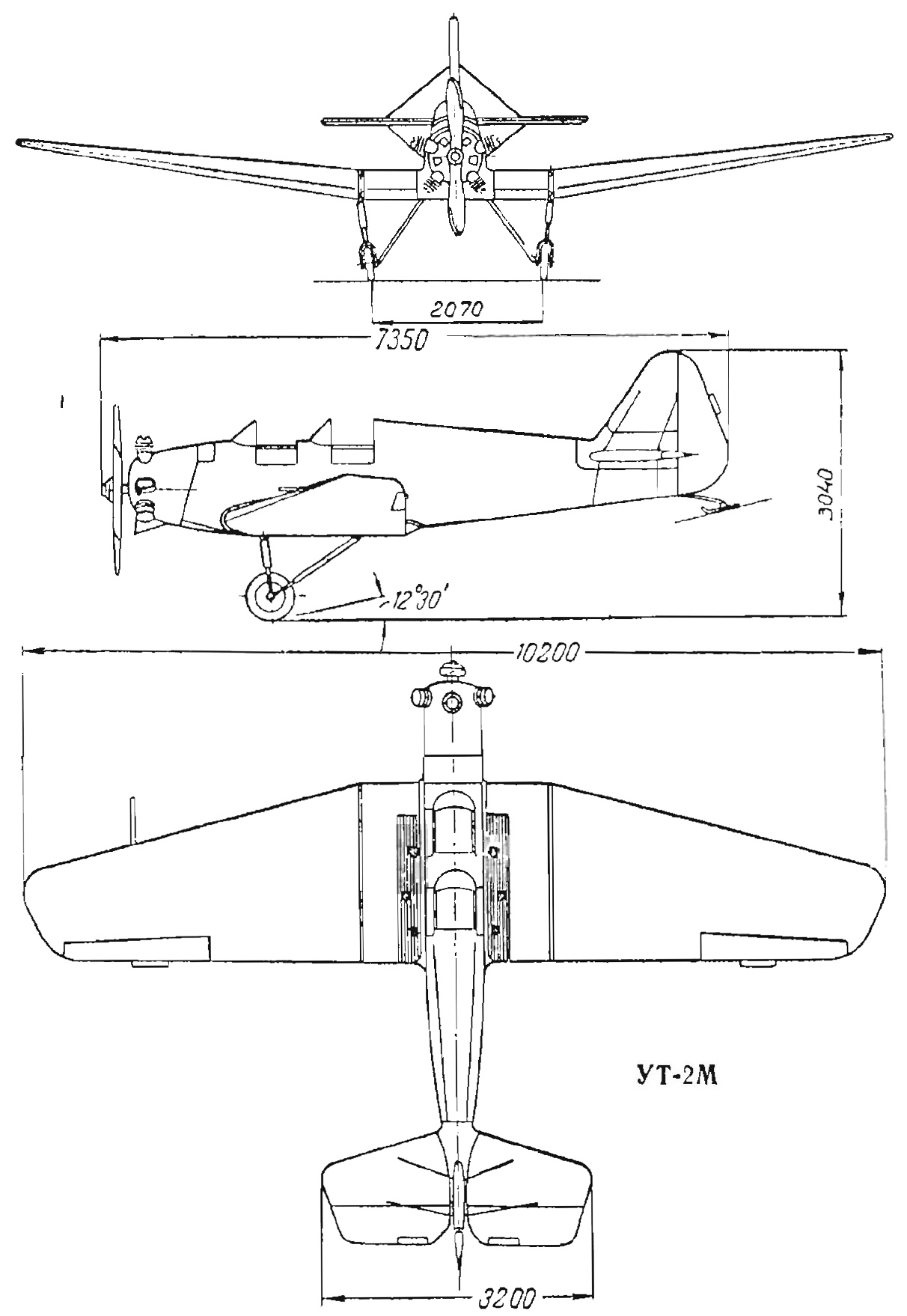
Yakovlev UT-2M drawing

AIR-10
precursor
Ya-20
prototype
UT-2
initial production variant
UT-2 (1940 standard)
improved spin characteristics.
UT-2 (1944 standard)
UT-2L
UT-2 with MV-4
inline engine for tests.
UT-2L
improved 1940 standard with canopy and engine cowling, fuselage similar to early Yak-18 but had fixed undercarriage.
UT-2M
production from 1941, new wings and empennage
UT-2MV
interim light bomber
UT-2N (SEN)
air cushion landing gear testbed
UT-2V
bomber trainer
VT-2
floatplane variant of basic UT-2
Yak-5
single-seat fighter-trainer development of UT-2L

== Operators ==
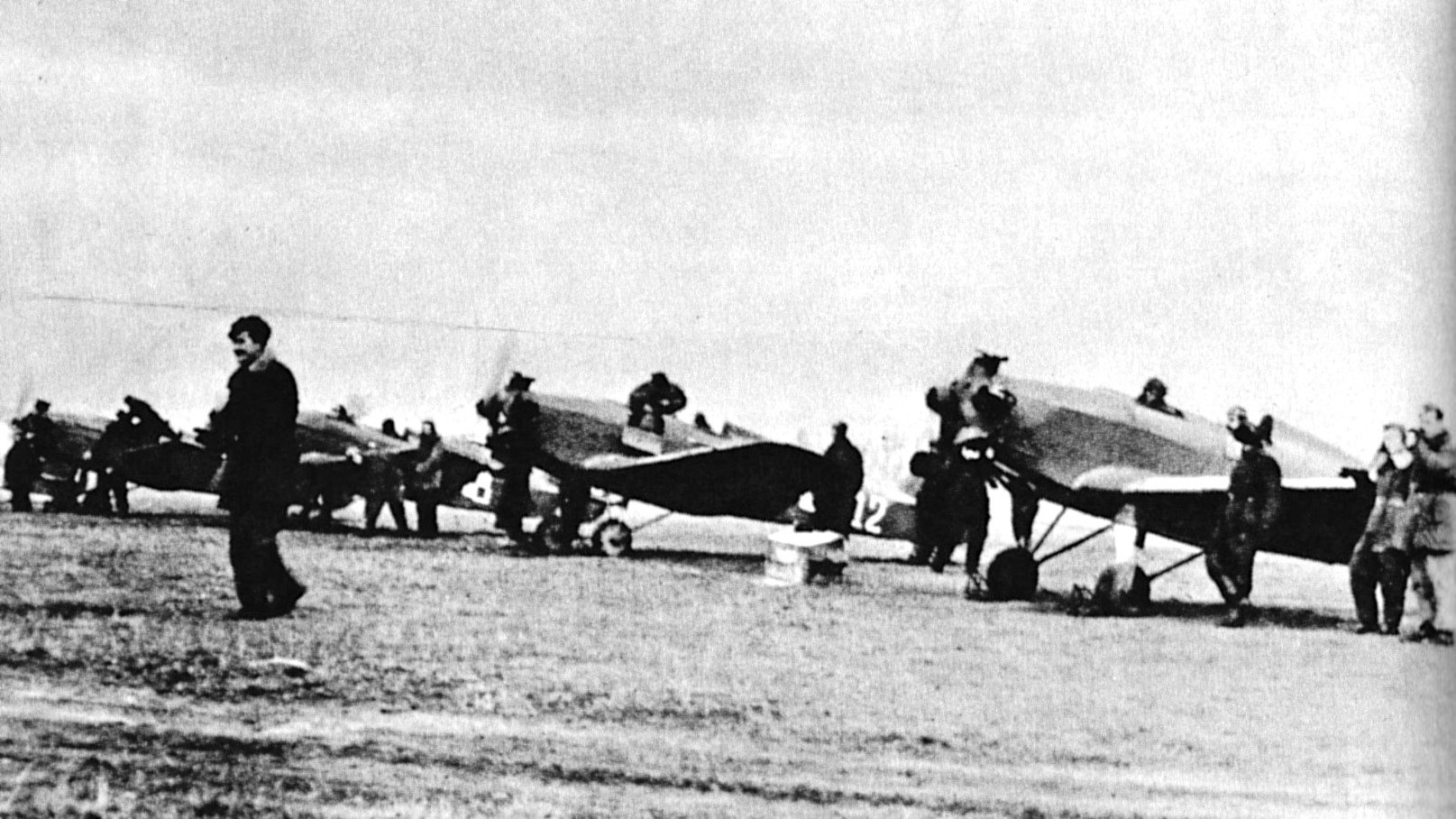
Polish UT-2s after the war.

France

- Normandie-Niemen unit

Hungary

- Hungarian Air Force

Poland

- Air Force of the Polish Army
- Polish Navy

Mongolia

- Mongolian People's Air Force

Romania

- Romanian Air Force

Soviet Union

- Soviet Air Force

Yugoslavia

- SFR Yugoslav Air Force
  - 1st Training Aviation Regiment (1945-1948)
  - 104th Training Aviation Regiment (1948-1956)
  - Liaison Squadron of 5th Military district (1952-1956)
  - Liaison Squadron of 3rd Aviation Corps (1950-1956)
- Letalski center Maribor

== Surviving aircraft ==
The Central Air Force Museum at Monino has an example on display, as does the Technical Museum of Vadim Zadorogny near the Arkhangelskoye Palace, and the Nikola Tesla Technical Museum in Zagreb, Croatia.

== Specifications (UT-2, 1940 standard) ==
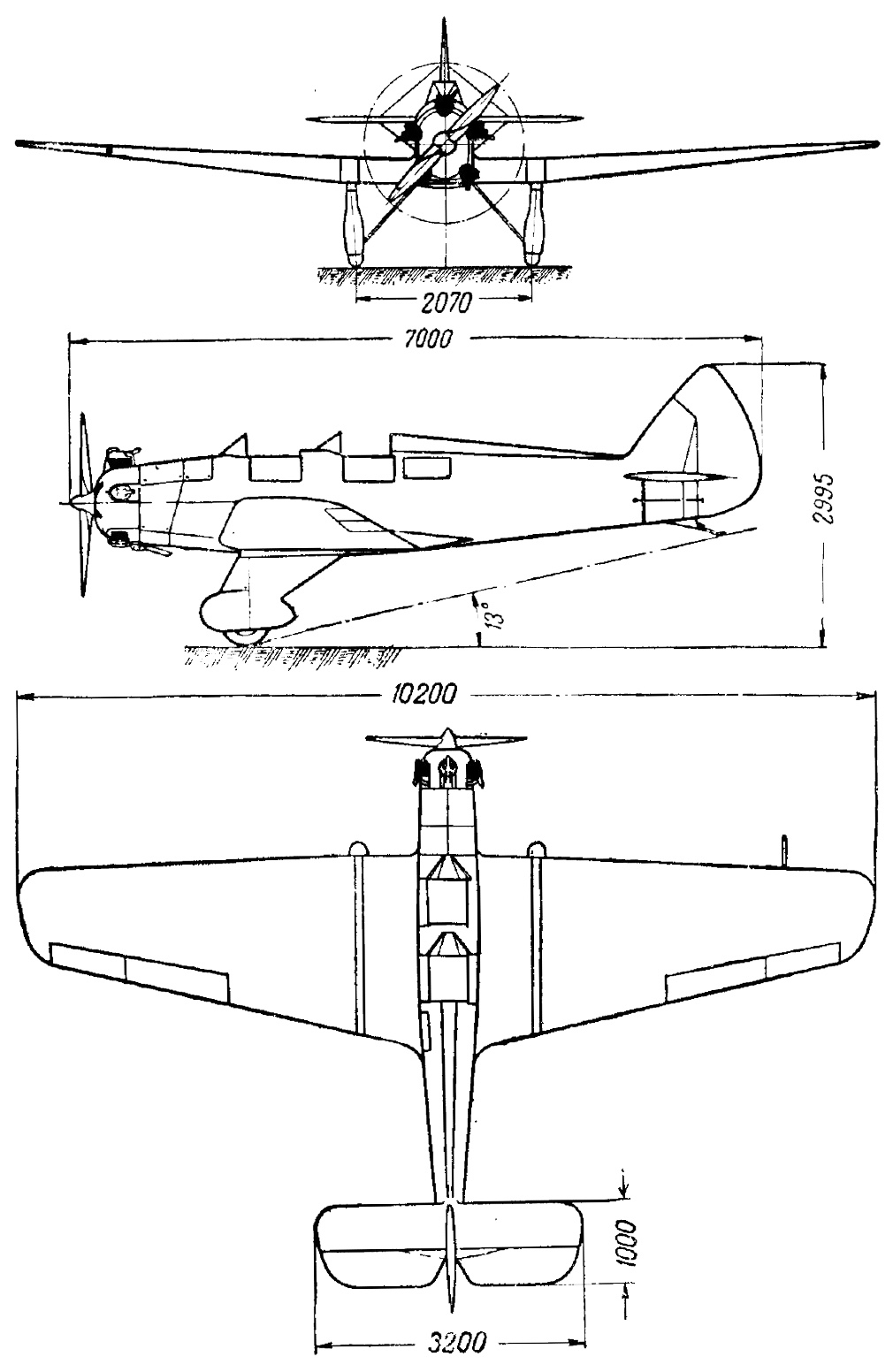
Yakovlev UT-2 drawing

Data from OKB Yakovlev: A History of the Design Bureau and its Aircraft, The Osprey Encyclopedia of Russian Aircraft 1875-1995

General characteristics

- Crew: 2
- Length: 7.15 m (23 ft 5 in)
- Wingspan: 10.2 m (33 ft 6 in)
- Height: 2.99 m (9 ft 10 in)
- Wing area: 17.12 m^{2} (184.3 sq ft)
- Airfoil: Göttingen 387
- Empty weight: 628 kg (1,385 lb)
- Gross weight: 940 kg (2,072 lb)
- Powerplant: 1 × Shvetsov M-11D 5-cylinder air-cooled radial piston engine, 93.2 kW (125.0 hp)
- Propellers: 2-bladed fixed-pitch propeller

Performance

- Maximum speed: 210 km/h (130 mph, 110 kn)
- Cruise speed: 99 km/h (62 mph, 53 kn)
- Range: 1,130 km (700 mi, 610 nmi)
- Service ceiling: 5,000 m (16,000 ft)
- Rate of climb: 3.3 m/s (650 ft/min)

Armament

- Rockets: 8 x RS-82 rockets. (UT-2MV)
- Bombs: 2-4 x 50 kg (110 lb) bombs (UT-2MV)

== See also ==
Aircraft of comparable role, configuration, and era

- British Aircraft Swallow
- Fairchild PT-23
- Mauboussin M.120
- Miles Magister
- Ryan PT-22

Related lists

- List of interwar military aircraft
- List of aircraft of World War II
- List of military aircraft of the Soviet Union and the CIS
