= Yakovlev Yak-18T =

Soviet training aircraft

Yak-18T
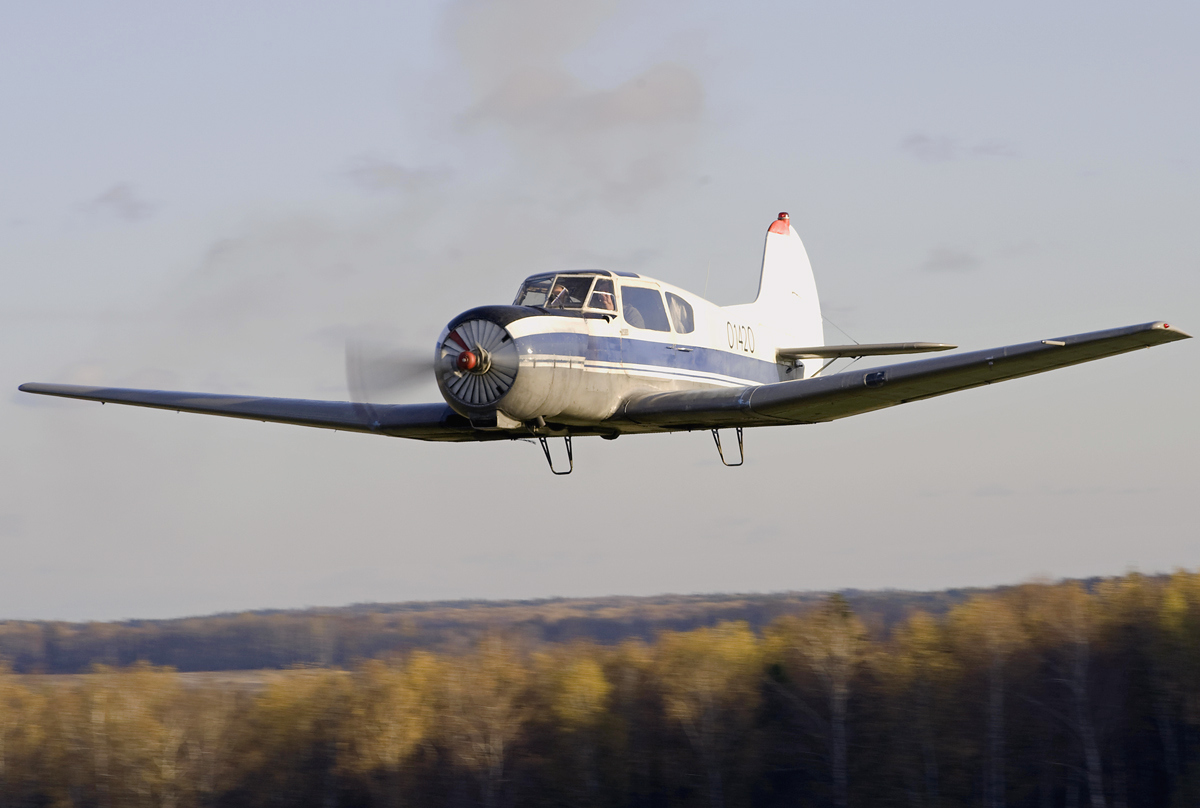

General information
- Type: Training aircraft
- Designer: Yakovlev
- Primary users: Aeroflot Soviet Air Force
- Number built: 750+

History
- Introduction date: 1967
- First flight: 1967
- Developed into: Technoavia SM-94

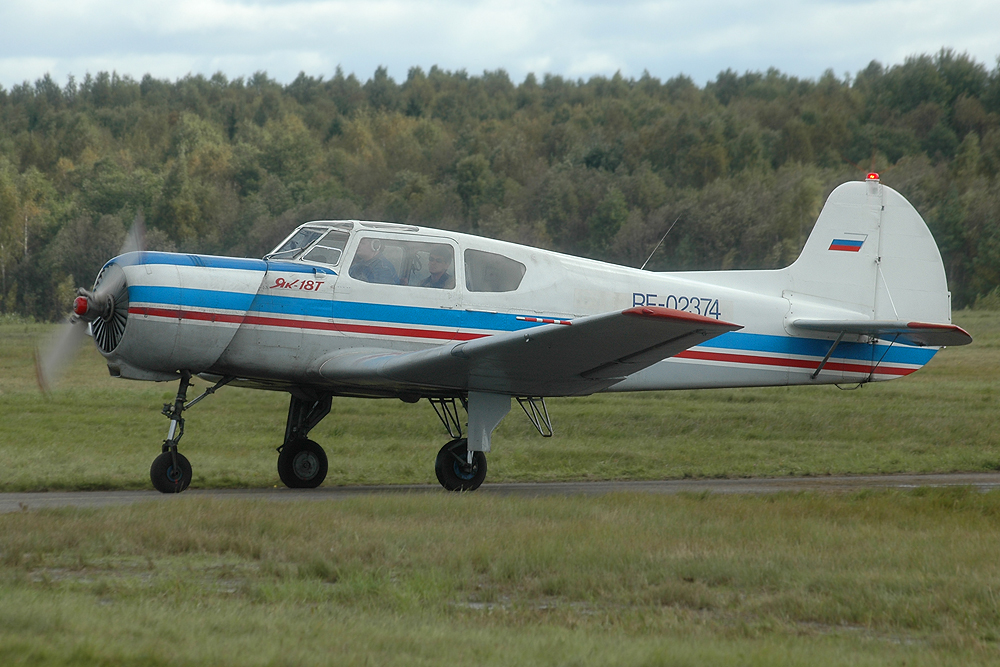
Yak-18T

The Yakovlev Yak-18T (Russian: Яковлев Як-18T) is a four- or five-seat fully aerobatic utility aircraft developed by Yakovlev. Introduced to train Aeroflot pilots, it has gained some popularity as a sportplane both inside and outside the former USSR. It is powered by a 268-298 kW (360-400 hp) Vedeneyev M14P radial engine, and is designed for stresses of +6.48/-3.24 g.

== Design and development ==
The Yak-18T is unrelated to the Yak-18. The Yak-18T is a unique design, despite its nomenclature.

The 18T was designed in the late 60's, as a civilian aircraft. The aircraft has a nosewheel, is a four- or five-seater, and has a nine-cylinder 360 hp radial engine. The Yak-18T shares some systems with the Yak-50/52 family. These aircraft all have the 265 kW (355 hp) Vedeneyev M14 nine-cylinder radial engine as well as the same underlying compressed-air system for engine starting, brakes, undercarriage and flaps. The propeller, avionics and other parts are also shared. The Yak-18T, like all Russian aircraft used for training, is aerobatic.

Compared with other four-seat light aircraft such as the Cessna 172 or the Piper PA-28, the Yak-18T is only a little wider and longer but it is much heavier and is equipped with a considerably more powerful engine. The Yak-18T is closer the Piper Saratoga which has two extra seats but which has a similar maximum weight, together with a retractable undercarriage and a similarly powerful engine. The Yak-18T is, however, distinguished by its stronger construction, aerobatic capability and docile yet responsive handling characteristics.

The Yak-18T prototype had its first flight in mid-1967 and subsequently was placed in series production in Smolensk.

== Operational history ==
The Yak-18T went on to become the standard basic trainer with Aeroflot flight schools, while small numbers also entered service with the Soviet Air Force as liaison and communications aircraft. After approximately 700 were built, many for Aeroflot, production ceased in the late 1980s, to be resumed in 1993. In 2011 it was claimed that the type remained in small-scale production by the Yakolev Design Bureau, although apparently none had been produced in more than a decade.

Technoavia has marketed the SM-94, its own development of the Yak-18T, featuring curved windshield, larger fuel tanks and choice of avionics package, but production is dependent on orders being placed.

== Operators ==
Cuba

- Cuban Air Force - Former operator.

Moldova

- Moldova Air Force - one aircraft in active service for basic training

Lithuania

- Lithuanian National Defence Volunteer Forces

Soviet Union

- Aeroflot
- Soviet Air Force

Transnistria

- Armed Forces of Transnistria

== Specifications (Yak-18T) ==
Data from EASA - Yak-18T

General characteristics

- Crew: 1 or 2
- Capacity: up to 4 subject to CoG limitations
- Length: 8.354 m (27 ft 5 in)
- Wingspan: 11.16 m (36 ft 7 in)
- Height: 3.4 m (11 ft 2 in)
- Wing area: 18.892 m^{2} (203.35 sq ft)
- Airfoil: root: Clark YH (14.5%); tip: Clark YH (9.3%)
- Empty weight: 1,217 kg (2,683 lb)
- Max takeoff weight: 1,650 kg (3,638 lb)

1,510 kg (3,329 lb) for aerobatics

- Fuel capacity: standard 183 L (48 US gal; 40 imp gal) in two wing tanks, (including a 3 L (0.79 US gal; 0.66 imp gal) collector tank)

or 363 L (96 US gal; 80 imp gal) in two wing tanks + collector
or 353 L (93 US gal; 78 imp gal) in four wing tanks (2x 90l + 2x 85l) + collector

- Powerplant: 1 × Vedeneyev M14P 9-cylinder air-cooled radial piston engine, 268 kW (359 hp)

or 1x 300 kW (400 hp) Vedeneyev M14PF

- Propellers: 2-bladed V-530TA-D35 constant-speed propeller (or MTV3-bladed propellers)

Performance

- Maximum speed: 262 km/h (163 mph, 141 kn)
- Cruise speed: 180–210 km/h (110–130 mph, 97–113 kn)
- Stall speed: 114 km/h (71 mph, 62 kn) idle, gear down, flaps down
- Never exceed speed: 300 km/h (190 mph, 160 kn)
- Range: 740 km (460 mi, 400 nmi)
- Service ceiling: 4,000 m (13,000 ft) (no Oxygen system)
- g limits: +6.4 -3.2 at 1,510 kg (3,329 lb)

+5 -2.5 at 1,650 kg (3,638 lb)

- Rate of climb: 5 m/s (980 ft/min)
- Take-off run: 200 m (656 ft)
- Landing run: 250 m (820 ft)
- Aircraft life:

- 3,500 flight hours,
- 15,000 landings,
- no calendar life limit is established

Avionics
standard factory fit:-

- Baklan 5 VHF
- ARK-9 ADF
- IMK-IAZ gyro magnetic compass system.
- AGD-1K gyro horizon
- ZUE-53U turn indicator
- PP-5 radio altimeter
