= Yakovlev Yak-5 =

Yak-5

General information
- Type: Training aircraft
- Manufacturer: Yakovlev
- Primary user: Soviet Air Force
- Number built: 1

History
- First flight: 7 September 1944
- Developed from: Yakovlev UT-2

The Yakovlev Yak-5 (Russian: Яковлев Як-5) was an experimental trainer aircraft designed by Yakovlev OKB in the Soviet Union, and first flown in 1944.

== Development and design ==
In 1944, the Yakovlev UT-2 was the standard primary trainer of the Soviet Air Forces, but its simplicity caused problems when pilots moved on to more sophisticated aircraft, so the Yakovlev design bureau designed a more sophisticated derivative, the UT-2L, which featured an enclosed tandem cockpit, the addition of flaps and blind flying instruments.

At the same time, Yakovlev designed a single-seat aircraft based on the UT-2L, intended as a fighter-trainer. This aircraft, the Yak-5, was a low-wing monoplane of wooden construction, but unlike the UT-2, had the front cockpit removed and an enclosed sliding canopy placed over the rear cockpit. A retractable tailwheel undercarriage replaced the fixed landing gear of the UT-2. It was powered by a Shvetsov M-11D five-cylinder radial producing 115 hp (86 kW), which drove a two-bladed variable-pitch propeller. It could be fitted with a single synchronized ShKAS machine gun aimed by a reflector sight, while the aircraft was also fitted with a radio.

== Operational history ==
The prototype Yak-5 first flew on 7 September 1944. The new fighter-trainer's handling proved popular with its test pilots, and the aircraft successfully passed official evaluation. In the end, neither the UT-2L or the Yak-5 entered production because the Soviet Air Force command believed wooden aircraft were becoming obsolete, which would result in production of the all-metal Yakovlev Yak-18 trainer in late 1945. The sole Yak-5 was destroyed when it suffered failure of the wooden wing during a snap roll and crashed.

== Specifications (Yak-5) ==
Data from Yakovlev Aircraft since 1924

General characteristics

- Crew: 1
- Length: 7.3 m (23 ft 11 in)
- Wingspan: 10.5 m (34 ft 5 in)
- Wing area: 17 m^{2} (180 sq ft)
- Empty weight: 770 kg (1,698 lb)
- Max takeoff weight: 940 kg (2,072 lb)
- Powerplant: 1 × Shvetsov M-11D 5-cylinder air-cooled radial piston engine, 86 kW (115 hp)
- Propellers: 2-bladed VISh-237 variable-pitch propeller

Performance

- Maximum speed: 250 km/h (160 mph, 130 kn)
- Landing speed: 85 km/h (53 mph; 46 kn)
- Range: 450 km (280 mi, 240 nmi)
- Take-off run: 180 m (590 ft)
- Landing run: 200 m (660 ft)

Armament

- 1x 7.62 mm (0.300 in) ShKAS machine-gun with 300 rounds

Avionics

- PBP-1 reflector sight
