= CJ-5 =

CJ-5 or CJ5 may refer to:

- Jeep CJ-5, American automobile
- Nanchang CJ-5, Chinese aircraft
- China railway CJ5, electro-diesel multiple unit produced by CRRC
