= Technoavia SM92 Finist =

1993 utility aircraft family by Technoavia

SM92 Finist
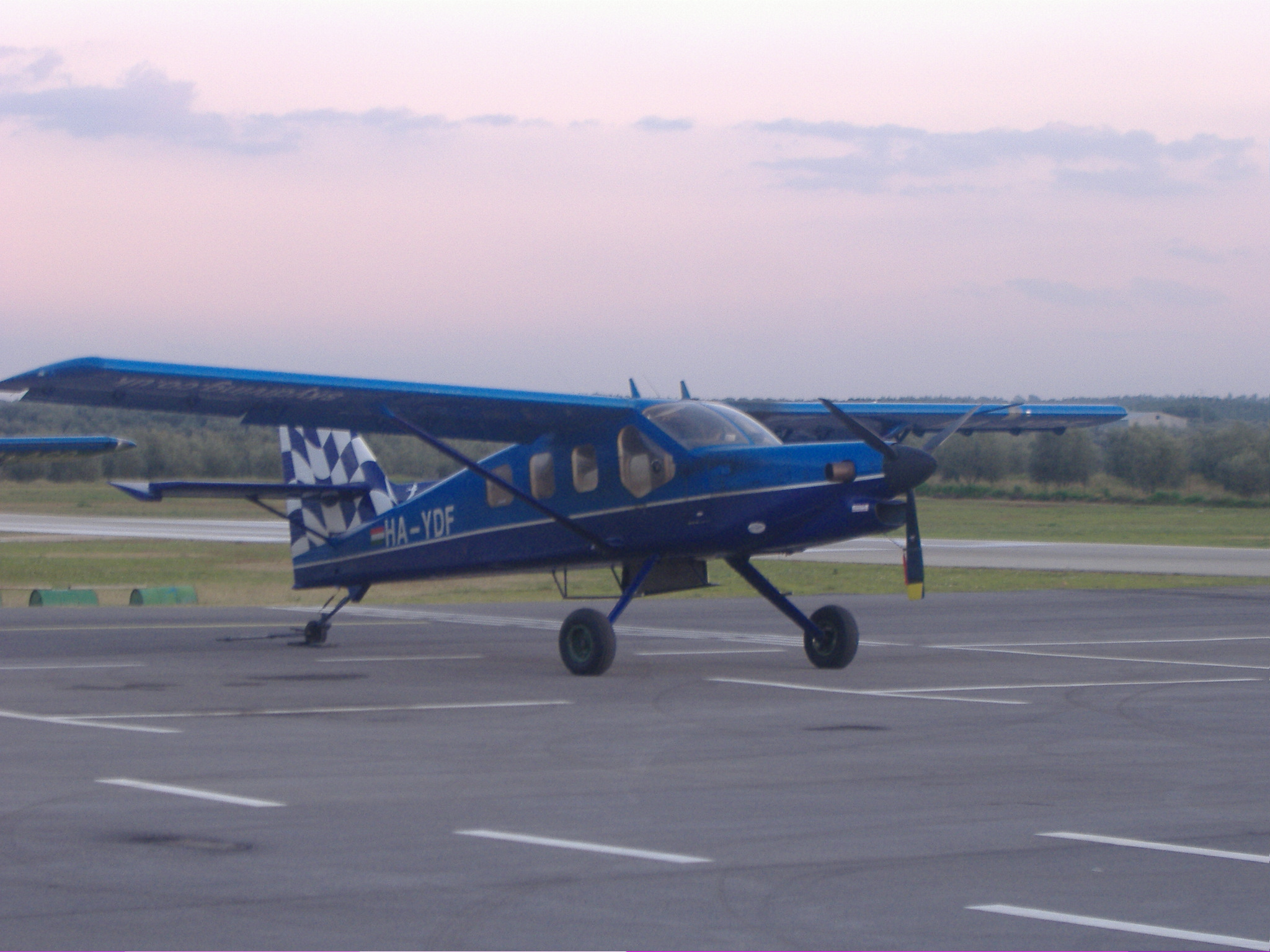
- Turbo-Finist SMG used for skydiving

General information
- Type: Light utility transport
- National origin: Russia
- Manufacturer: Technoavia
- Status: Production
- Number built: about 30

History
- First flight: 28 December 1993

The Technoavia SM92 Finist is a STOL utility aircraft, designed by the Russian company Technoavia which first flew on 28 December 1993. It is built at the Smolensk Aviation Plant.

== Variants ==
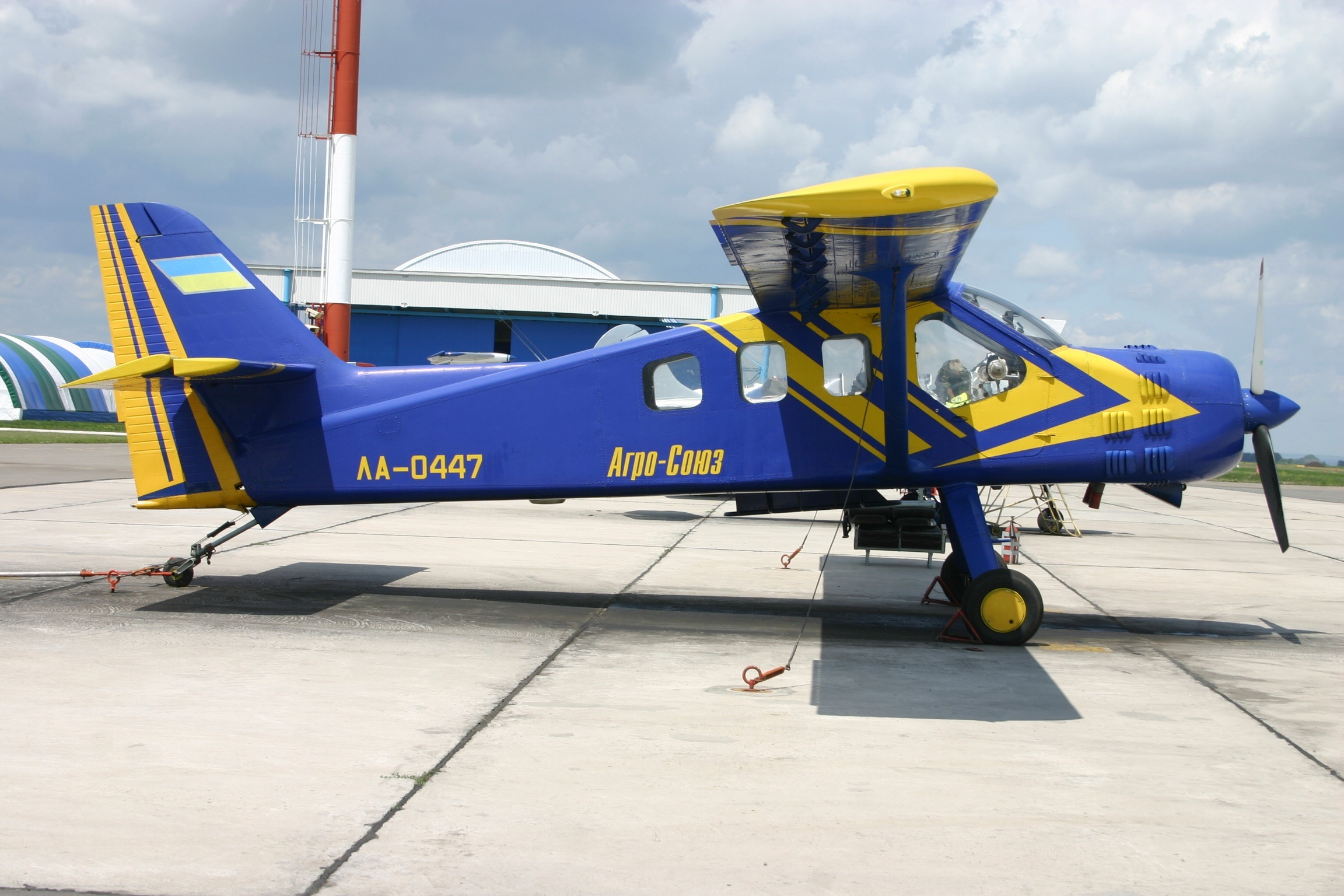
Basic SM-92 with 270 kW (360 hp) Vedeneyev M14P radial engine.

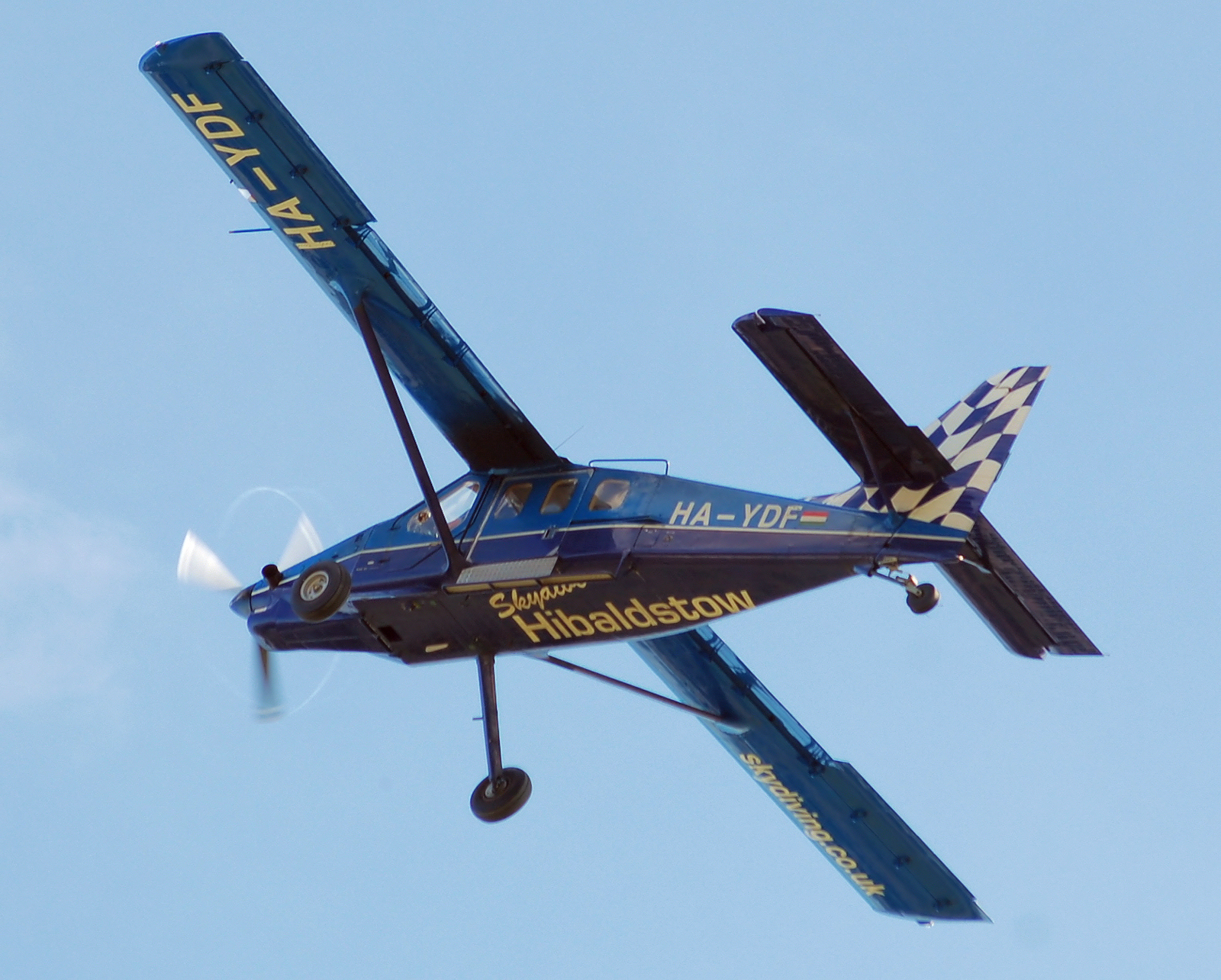
SMG-92 Turbo Finist based at the skydiving centre at Hibaldstow, Lincolnshire, England

SM92 Finist
Basic version, powered by 270 kW (360 hp) Vedeneyev M14P radial engine.
SM92P Finist
Armed version for Border guard duties. Two fixed forward firing PK machine guns and one inside cabin firing through open cabin doors and two rocket launchers.
SM-92T Turbo Finist
Version powered by Walter M601 turboprop engine. One prototype converted.
SMG-92 Turbine Finist
Walter M601 powered version built in Slovakia by Aerotech Slovakia for use in skydiving. At least six converted.
Zlin Z400
Version powered by Orenda OE600 V-8 engine, planned to be built by Moravan Otrokovice in the Czech Republic. One built.
Orbis Avia SM-92T
SM-92T built by Czech aircraft manufacturer Orbis Avia. One built 2015, fitted with 560 kW (750 hp) GE H75 turboprop in 2017.

== Operators ==
Russia

- Russian Border Guard

== Specifications (SM92) ==
Data from Brassey's World Aircraft & Systems Directory 1999/2000

General characteristics

- Crew: 1
- Capacity:
  - 6 passengers or
  - 2 stretchers plus attendant
  - 600 kg (1,323 lb) cargo
- Length: 9.13 m (29 ft 11 in)
- Wingspan: 14.6 m (47 ft 11 in)
- Height: 3.08 m (10 ft 1 in)
- Wing area: 20.44 m^{2} (220.0 sq ft)
- Empty weight: 1,430 kg (3,153 lb)
- Max takeoff weight: 2,350 kg (5,181 lb)
- Powerplant: 1 × Vedeneyev M14P 9-cylinder air-cooled radial piston engine, 269 kW (361 hp)
- Propellers: 3-bladed constant-speed propeller

Performance

- Maximum speed: 230 km/h (140 mph, 120 kn)
- Cruise speed: 200 km/h (120 mph, 110 kn)
- Stall speed: 100 km/h (62 mph, 54 kn) flaps down
- Never exceed speed: 290 km/h (180 mph, 160 kn)
- Range: 1,380 km (860 mi, 750 nmi) max fuel, 40 minutes reserves
- Service ceiling: 3,000 m (9,800 ft)
- Rate of climb: 5 m/s (980 ft/min)
