= Paracossus furcatus =

Scientific classification
- Kingdom: Animalia
- Phylum: Arthropoda
- Class: Insecta
- Order: Lepidoptera
- Family: Cossidae
- Genus: Paracossus
- Species: P. furcatus

Binomial name
- Paracossus furcatus Hampson, 1904

Species of moth

Paracossus furcatus is a moth in the family Cossidae. It is found in Burma.
