= Paracossus parvus =

Scientific classification
- Kingdom: Animalia
- Phylum: Arthropoda
- Class: Insecta
- Order: Lepidoptera
- Family: Cossidae
- Genus: Paracossus
- Species: P. parvus

Binomial name
- Paracossus parvus Hampson, 1904

Synonyms
- Paracossus parva

Species of moth

Paracossus parvus is a moth in the family Cossidae. It is found in Sri Lanka.
