= Hollowiella amasonca =

Scientific classification
- Kingdom: Animalia
- Phylum: Arthropoda
- Clade: Pancrustacea
- Class: Insecta
- Order: Lepidoptera
- Family: Cossidae
- Genus: Hollowiella
- Species: H. amasonca

Binomial name
- Hollowiella amasonca (Yakovlev, 2006)

Synonyms
- Paracossus amasonca Yakovlev, 2006

Species of moth

Hollowiella amasonca is a moth in the family Cossidae. It was described by Yakovlev in 2006. It is found in the Philippines (Palawan).

== Description ==
The length of the forewings measures 14–17 mm across.
