= Hollowiella bajin =

Scientific classification
- Kingdom: Animalia
- Phylum: Arthropoda
- Clade: Pancrustacea
- Class: Insecta
- Order: Lepidoptera
- Family: Cossidae
- Genus: Hollowiella
- Species: H. bajin

Binomial name
- Hollowiella bajin Yakovlev & Witt, 2009

Species of moth

Hollowiella bajin is a moth in the family Cossidae. It is found in Myanmar.
