= Technoavia =

Russian aircraft manufacturer

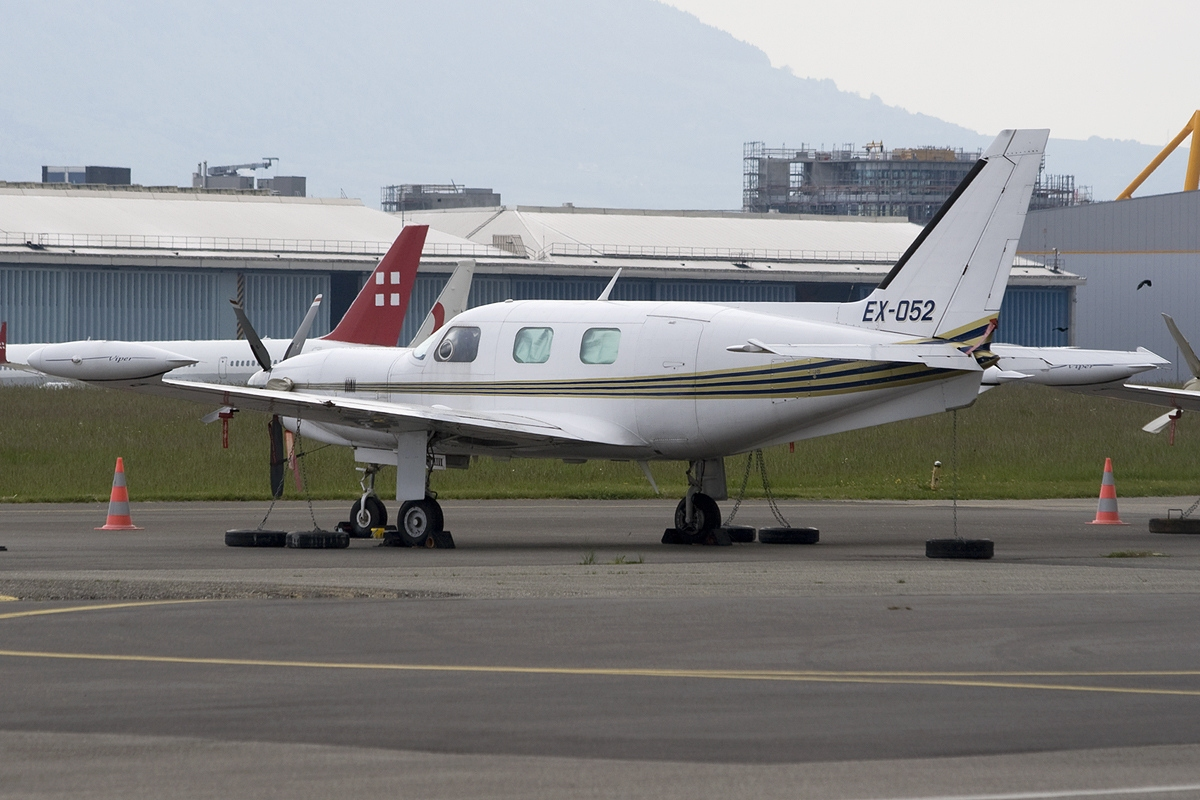
Technoavia GM-17

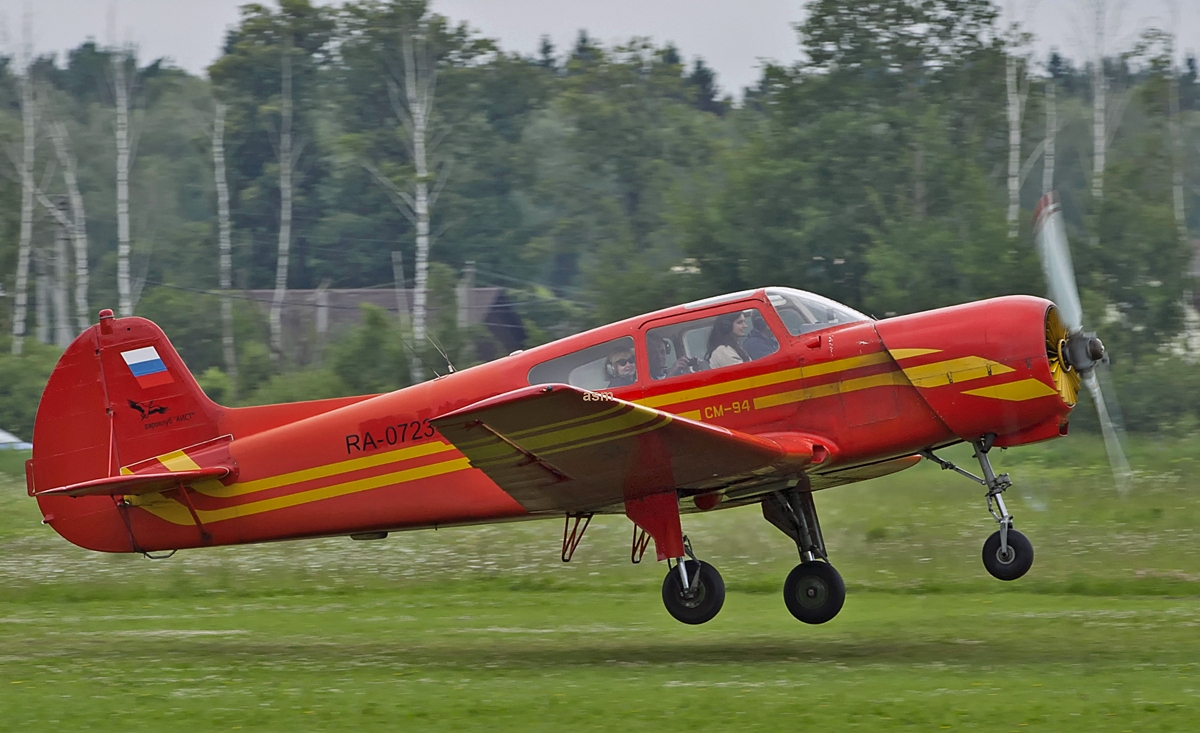
Technoavia SM-94

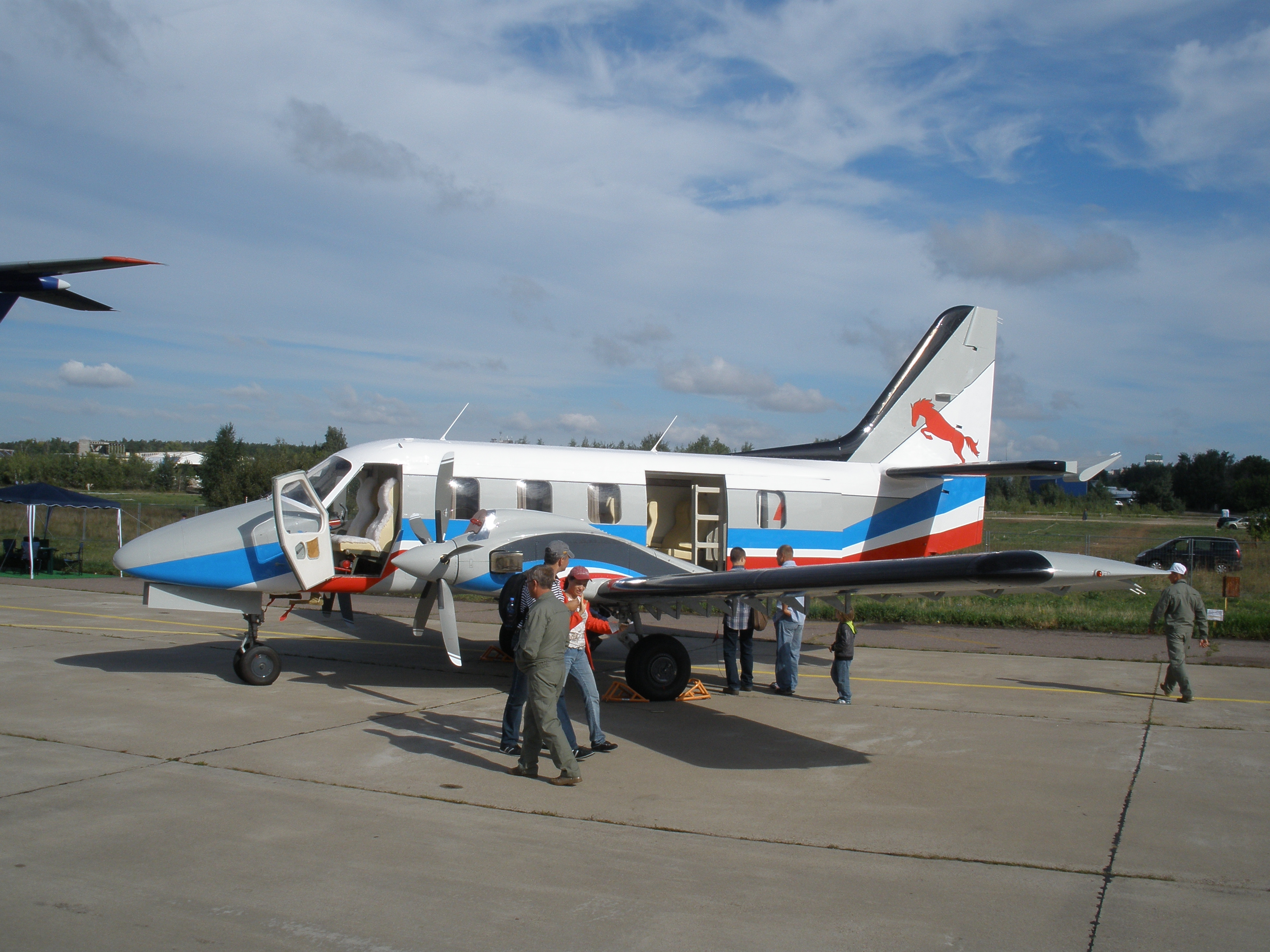
Technoavia Rysachok at MAKS-2011 airshow

LLC SCF Technoavia, or Scientific Commercial Firm Technoavia, is a Russian aircraft manufacturer. It was established in 1991 by Vyacheslav Kondratiev. The main production facility is located at the Smolensk Aviation Plant.

== Products ==
- Intracom GM-17 Viper
- Technoavia SM92 Finist
  - SM-92T
  - SMG-92
  - SM-92P patrol military version of the aircraft
- Technoavia SM-94 and SM-94-1, modifications of the Yak-18T
- SP-91 aerobatic aircraft
- SP-95 high performance aerobatic monoplane
- SM-2000 single-engine, 4 passenger, light turboprop aircraft
- SP-55M, a heavily modified Yak-55
- Technoavia Rysachok - a twin-engine aircraft under development
