= Paracossus zyaung =

Scientific classification
- Kingdom: Animalia
- Phylum: Arthropoda
- Clade: Pancrustacea
- Class: Insecta
- Order: Lepidoptera
- Family: Cossidae
- Genus: Paracossus
- Species: P. zyaung

Binomial name
- Paracossus zyaung Yakovlev, 2014

Species of moth

Paracossus zyaung is a moth in the family Cossidae. It is found in Vietnam.
