= Paracossus indradit =

Scientific classification
- Kingdom: Animalia
- Phylum: Arthropoda
- Clade: Pancrustacea
- Class: Insecta
- Order: Lepidoptera
- Family: Cossidae
- Genus: Paracossus
- Species: P. indradit

Binomial name
- Paracossus indradit Yakovlev, 2009

Species of moth

Paracossus indradit is a moth in the family Cossidae. It was described by Yakovlev in 2009. It is found in Thailand.
