= Technoavia SP-95 =

SP-95
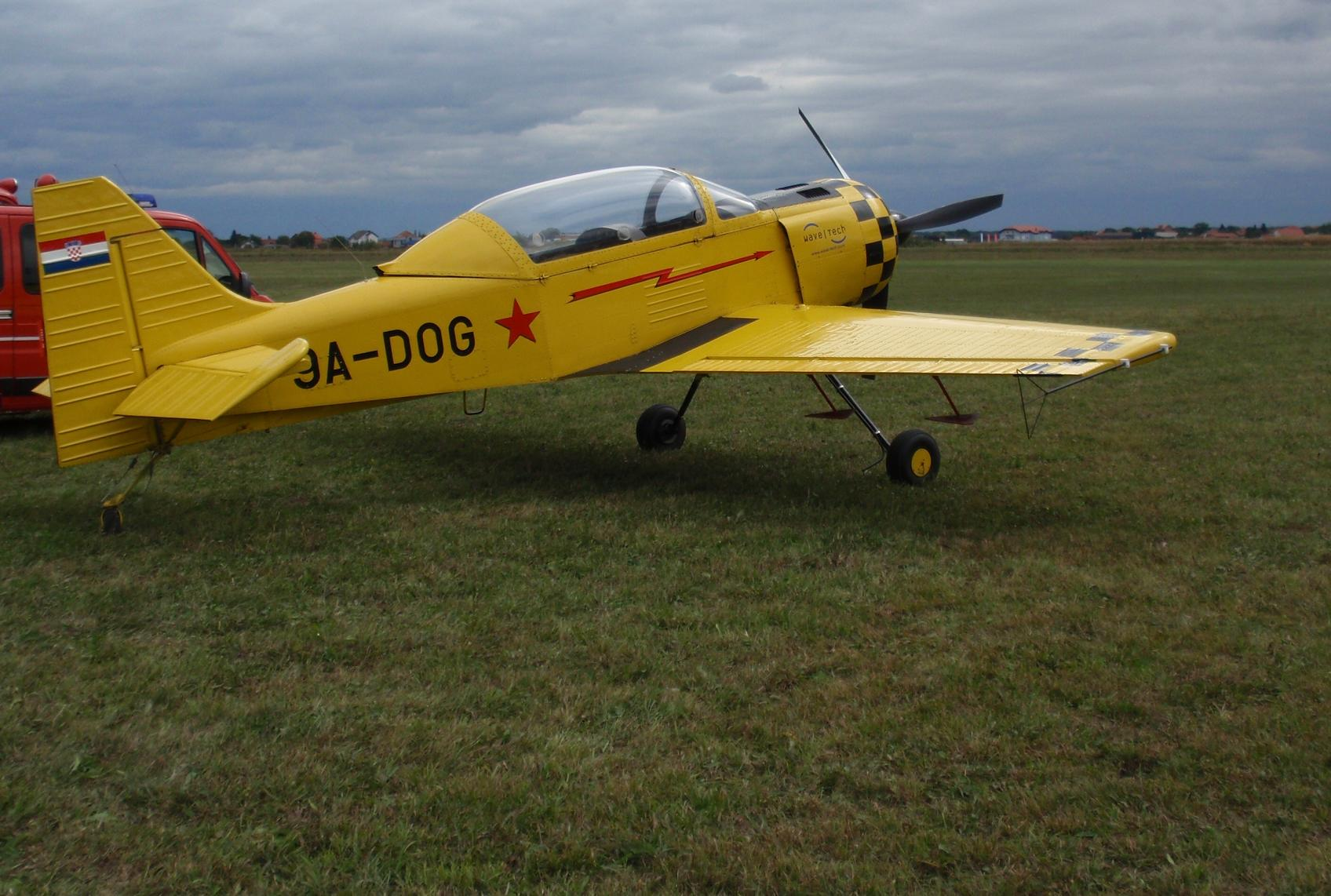
- The SP-91 was also marketed outside Russia as the Interavia I-3 (Интеравиа И-3)

General information
- Type: Aerobatic monoplane
- National origin: Russia
- Manufacturer: Technoavia

The Technoavia SP-95 is a Russian aerobatic aircraft, a production version of the earlier SP-91 Slava. The design is similar to the Sukhoi Su-26 family as it was designed by the same designer. It is an aerobatic competition aircraft and can be changed from single-seat to two-seat configuration. The SP-95 is a metal construction low-wing cantilever monoplane with a conventional landing gear with a tail-wheel. It is powered by a Vedeneyev M14P radial piston engine.

== Variants ==
SP-91 Slava
Prototype aerobatic competition aircraft powered by an AOOT M-14P engine, five built. Also marketed outside Russia as the Interavia I-3.
SP-95
Production variant of the SP-91.

== Specifications (SP-95) ==
Data from

General characteristics

- Crew: one or two
- Length: 7.00 m (23 ft 0 in)
- Wingspan: 8.40 m (27 ft 7 in)
- Wing area: 11.7 m^{2} (126 sq ft)
- Aspect ratio: 6.03
- Empty weight: 800 kg (1,764 lb)
- Max takeoff weight: 1,080 kg (2,381 lb)
- Powerplant: 1 × Vedeneyev M14P Nine-cylinder radial engine, 270 kW (360 hp)
- Propellers: 3-bladed

Performance

- Maximum speed: 300 km/h (190 mph, 160 kn)
- Stall speed: 105 km/h (65 mph, 57 kn)
- Never exceed speed: 450 km/h (280 mph, 240 kn)
- Range: 1,300 km (810 mi, 700 nmi) with full fuel
- g limits: +11, - 9 (single-seat) or +12, -10 (two-seat)
- Rate of climb: 17.0 m/s (3,350 ft/min)

== See also ==
Related development

- Sukhoi Su-26

Related lists

- List of aerobatic aircraft
