= Paracossus longispinalis =

Scientific classification
- Kingdom: Animalia
- Phylum: Arthropoda
- Class: Insecta
- Order: Lepidoptera
- Family: Cossidae
- Genus: Paracossus
- Species: P. longispinalis

Binomial name
- Paracossus longispinalis (Chou et Hua, 1988)

Synonyms
- Bifiduncus longispinalis Chou et Hua, 1988

Species of moth

Paracossus longispinalis is a moth in the family Cossidae. It is found in China.
