= Paracossus griseatus =

Scientific classification
- Kingdom: Animalia
- Phylum: Arthropoda
- Clade: Pancrustacea
- Class: Insecta
- Order: Lepidoptera
- Family: Cossidae
- Genus: Paracossus
- Species: P. griseatus

Binomial name
- Paracossus griseatus Yakovlev, 2009

Species of moth

Paracossus griseatus is a moth in the family Cossidae. It was described by Yakovlev in 2009. It is found in Cambodia.
