= Hollowiella chanwu =

Scientific classification
- Kingdom: Animalia
- Phylum: Arthropoda
- Clade: Pancrustacea
- Class: Insecta
- Order: Lepidoptera
- Family: Cossidae
- Genus: Hollowiella
- Species: H. chanwu

Binomial name
- Hollowiella chanwu Yakovlev & Witt, 2009

Species of moth

Hollowiella chanwu is a moth in the family Cossidae. It is found in Vietnam.
