= Yakovlev Yak-18 =

Training aircraft in the Soviet Union

Yak-18
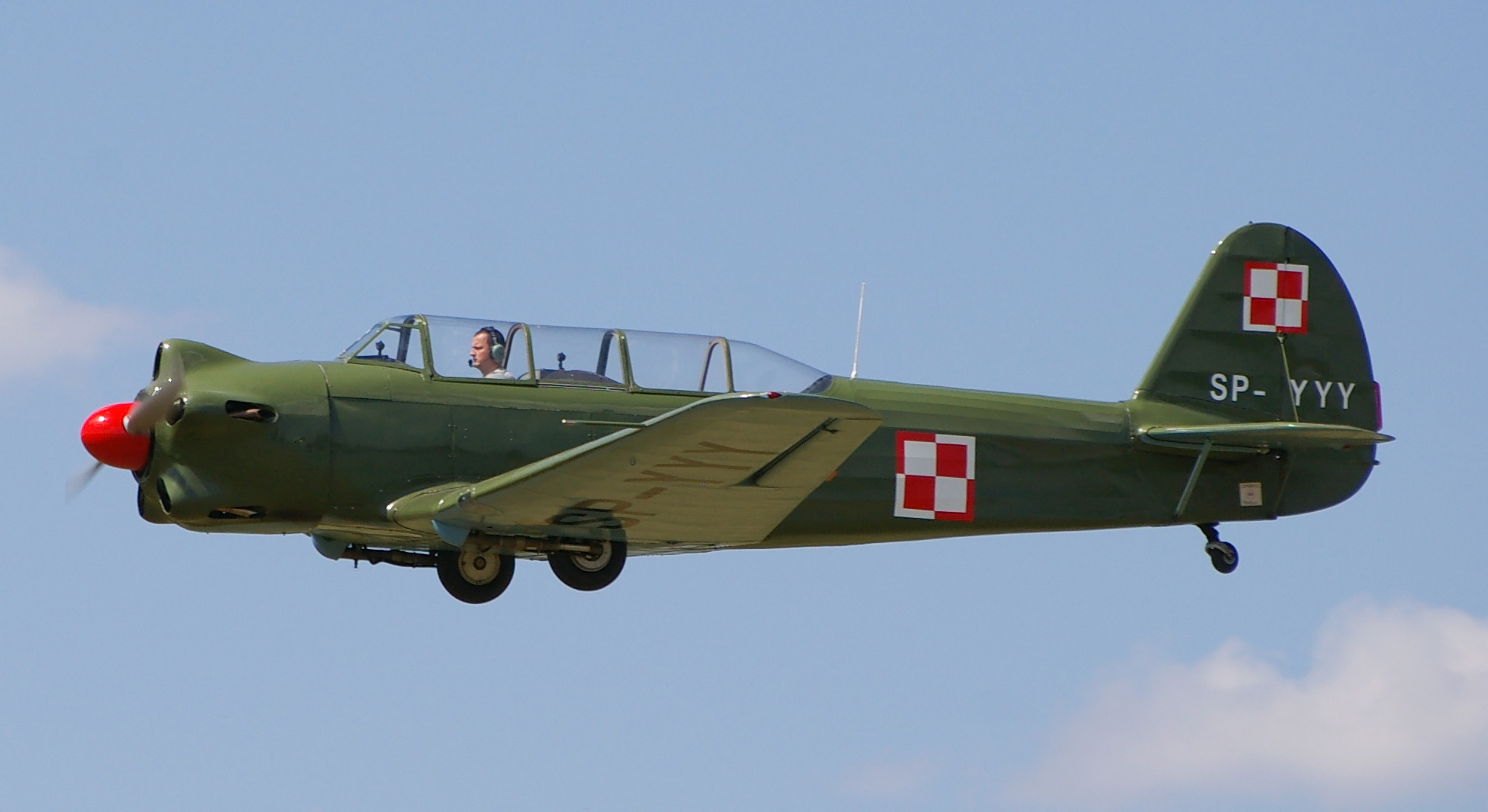
- A Polish Yakovlev Yak-18 in flight

General information
- Type: Training aircraft
- Manufacturer: Yakovlev
- Status: in limited service
- Primary users: Soviet Air Force DOSAAF; People's Liberation Army Air Force; Polish Air Force

History
- Introduction date: 1946
- First flight: 1946

The Yakovlev Yak-18 (Russian: Яковлев Як-18; NATO reporting name Max) is a tandem two-seat military primary trainer aircraft manufactured in the Soviet Union. Originally powered by one 119 kW (160 hp) Shvetsov M-11FR-1 radial piston engine, it entered service in 1946. It was also produced in China as the Nanchang CJ-5.

== Design and development ==
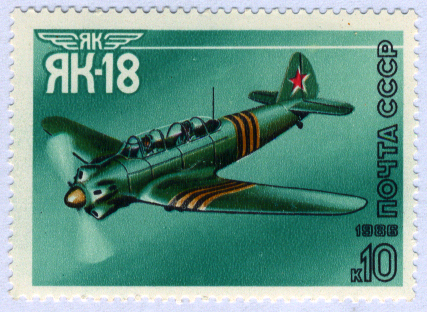
1986 postage stamp issued by the Soviet Union to commemorate the Yak-18

A member of the second generation of Russian aircraft designers, and best known for fighter designs, Alexander Sergeyevich Yakovlev always retained a light aircraft design section. In May 1945, Yakovlev initiated design of the Yak-18 two-seat primary trainer. He designed it to replace the earlier Yakovlev UT-2 and Yakovlev Yak-5 in service with the Soviet Air Forces and DOSAAF (Voluntary Society for Collaboration with the Army, Air Force and Navy, which sponsored aero clubs throughout the USSR). In 1944, an advanced version of the UT-2 had been built with many of the features of the new Yak-18. The new aircraft flew a year later, powered by a 119 kW (160 hp) Shvetsov M-11 five-cylinder radial engine and featuring pneumatically operated retractable main landing gear and a fixed tailwheel. It entered service as a trainer later that year and was built by Yakovlev up until 1956. Examples were exported to China in kit form beginning in 1950. The Chinese began producing license built copies in 1954 with the designation CJ-5.

The Yak-18's greatest claim to fame is its use as a night bomber by the North Korean Air Force during the Korean War. The aircraft were modified with bomb racks on the wing center section and flew over UN troop locations at night to drop bombs and harass UN forces. The single most successful attack of the North Korean aviation during the war was the destruction of a fuel dump with nearly 5.5 million US gallons (21 million L; 4.6 million imp gal) of fuel in the Inchon area in June 1953 by four or five Yak-18s. The five-cylinder engine reminded many of the US troops of the sound made by early gasoline powered washing machines, earning them the name: "Washing Machine Charlie". The name "Bed Check Charlie" was also used for these night intruders. The Yak-18s, along with Polikarpov Po-2s, became quite a nuisance until US night fighters began shooting them down. One nightfighter crashed shooting down a Bed Check Charlie and another nightfighter rammed its target.

Other claims to fame for the Yak-18 are an international speed record for its class in 1951 as well as being the aircraft used for initial flight training by Yuri Gagarin (1st human in space) and Ken Rowe (No Kum-Sok, who defected from North Korea with a Mikoyan-Gurevich MiG-15 jet fighter during the Korean War). Later, as the need for conventional landing gear trainers abated, Yakovlev re-designed the Yak-18 with retractable tricycle landing gear and an Ivchenko AI-14RF radial engine of 224 kW (300 hp); this was designated the Yak-18A. The design proved exceptionally easy to build and maintain.

There are an estimated 40 original Yak-18s in existence worldwide. Five are currently flyable in the US, three are flyable in Europe, and the Chinese Air Force has one flyable with several other airframes in storage. Approximately four other aircraft worldwide are currently being restored for flight. Many are found in major aviation museums worldwide including the National Air and Space Museum in the USA. The Nanchang CJ-6, produced in China, is sometimes quoted as a variant but is a completely different aircraft designed in China by Bushi Cheng and built by Nanchang Aircraft Company.

== Operational history ==
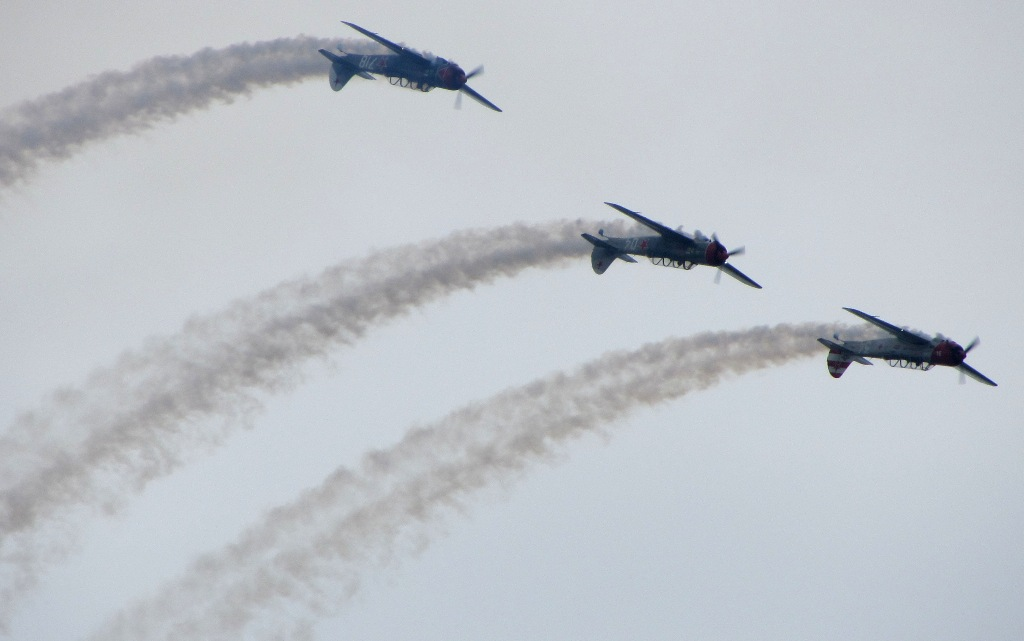
Aerobatic formation of Yak-18s

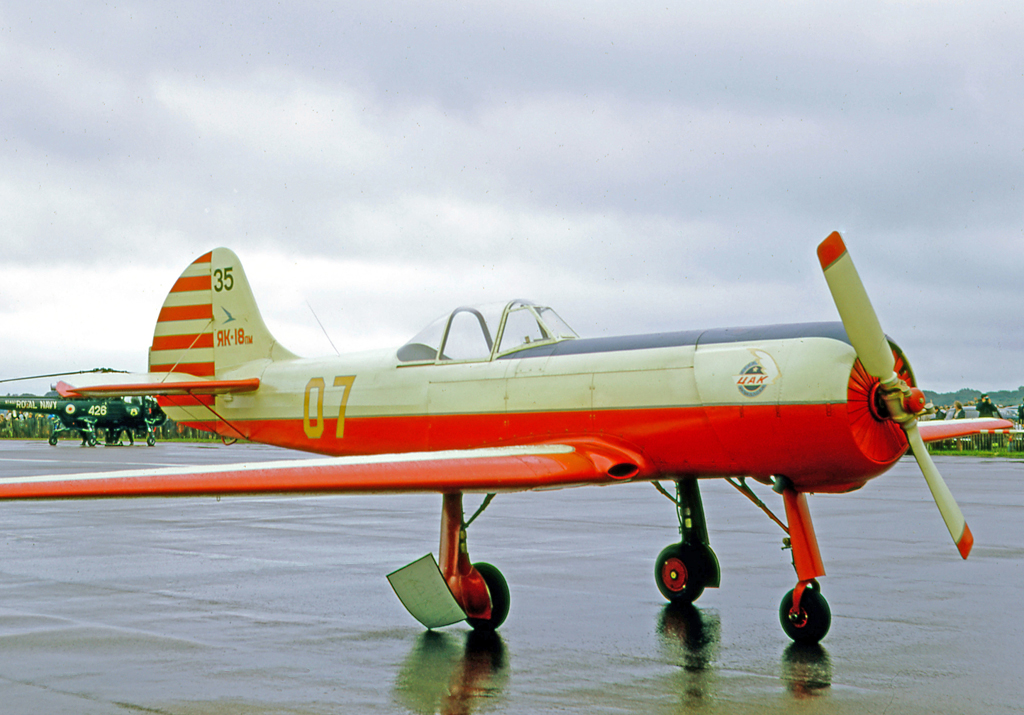
Soviet Yak-18PM single-seat aerobatic aircraft competing in the 1970 World Aerobatic Championship at RAF Hullavington, England, in 1970

The Yak-18 became the standard trainer for Air Force flying schools and DOSAAF, was in wide use in China, and in many other countries.

Photographs showing Kim Jong-Un visiting a North Korean Air Force base in March 2014 suggest that the North Koreans may still maintain original Yak-18s or CJ-5s in a bombing role.

== Variants ==
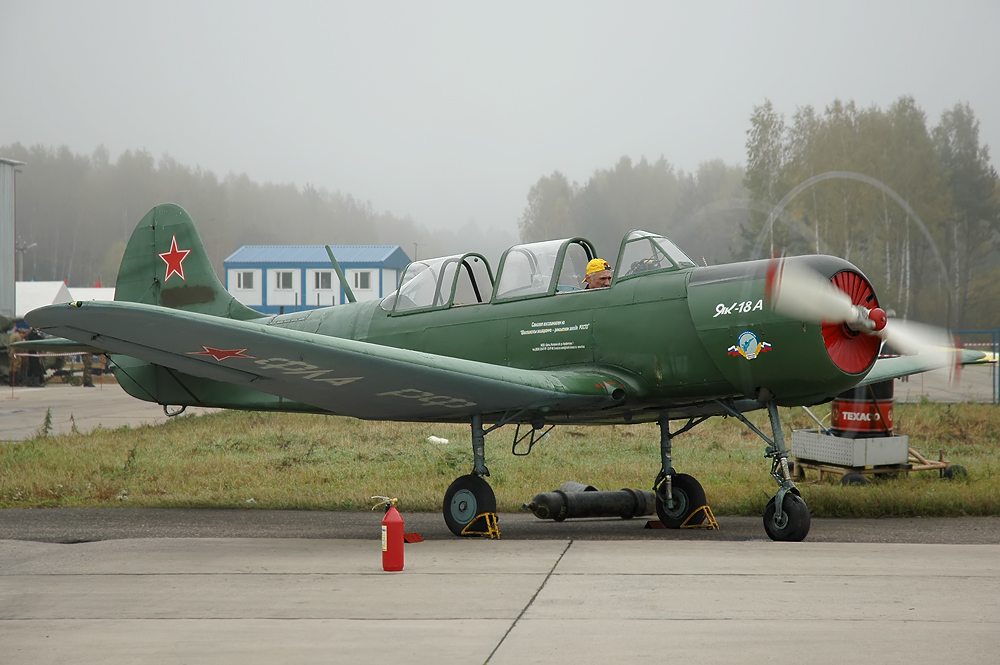
Yak-18A

Yak-18
The original production version. Retractable main undercarriage, fixed tailwheel.
Yak-18U
This version was built in small numbers. It had retractable tricycle landing gear.
Yak-18A
Cleaned up version of the Yak-18U, powered by a 194 kW (260 hp) Ivchenko AI-14 FR engine. Built in large numbers.
Yak-18P (NATO reporting name Mouse)
Single-seat aerobatic aircraft for use by flying clubs. Adaptation of Yak-18 two-seat trainer.
Yak-18PM
Single-seat aerobatic aircraft with retractable tricycle landing gear.
Yak-18PS
Aerobatic aircraft with retractable main gear.
Hongzhuan-501 (Red Craftsman)
Probable original designation for early CJ-5 production aircraft.
Nanchang CJ-5
The Yak-18 was built under licence in China as the CJ-5 for use by the PLAAF, PLANAF and civilian flying clubs; 379 CJ-5s had been built when production ended in 1958.

== Similar model designation ==
The Yakovlev Yak-18T was developed as an Aeroflot training aircraft and also as a light passenger transport aircraft, with a cabin for one pilot and three passengers. It is not a variant of the Yak-18 as it has very little in common, and was designed from scratch 20 years later.

== Operators ==
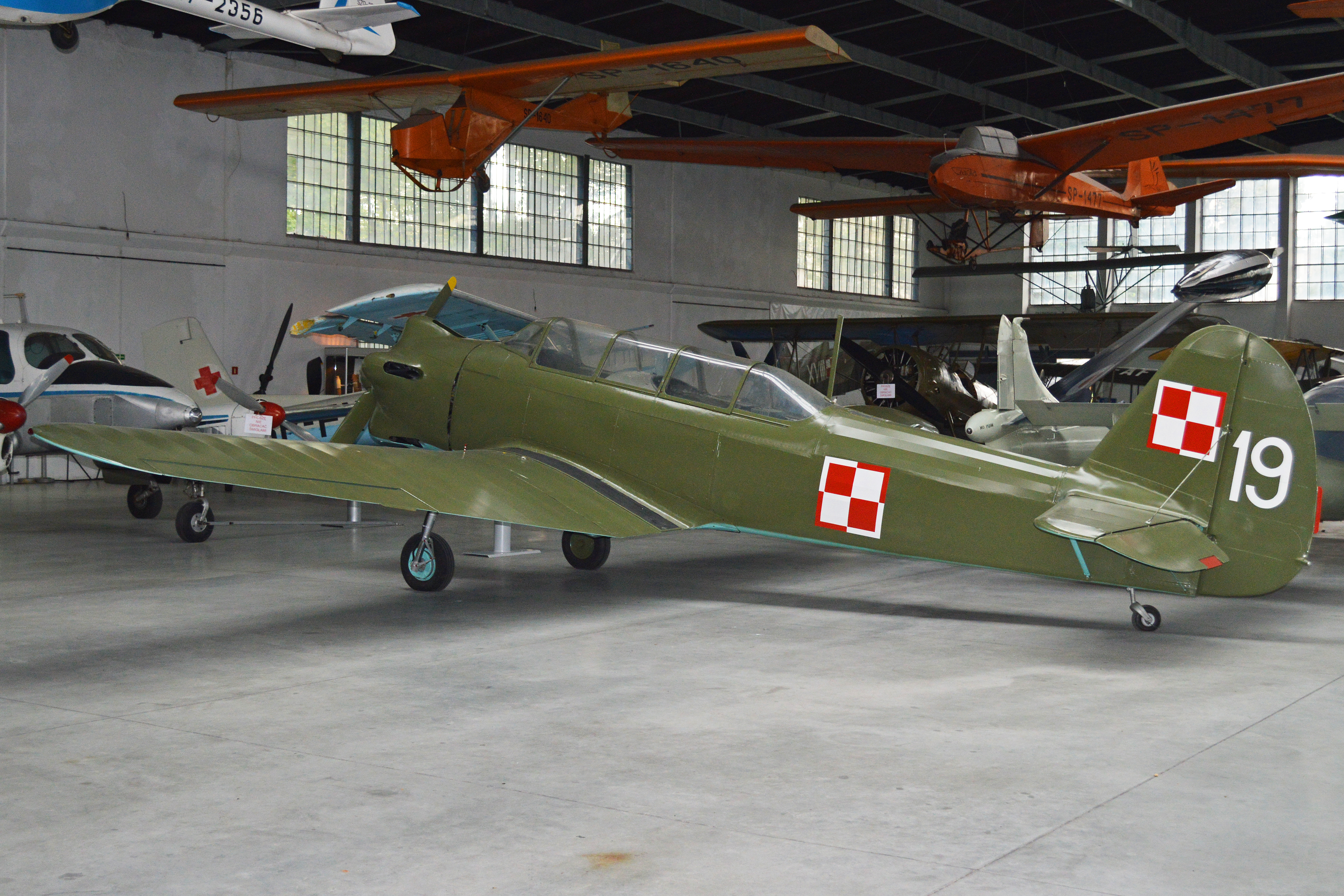
Polish Air Force Yak-18 in the Polish Aviation Museum

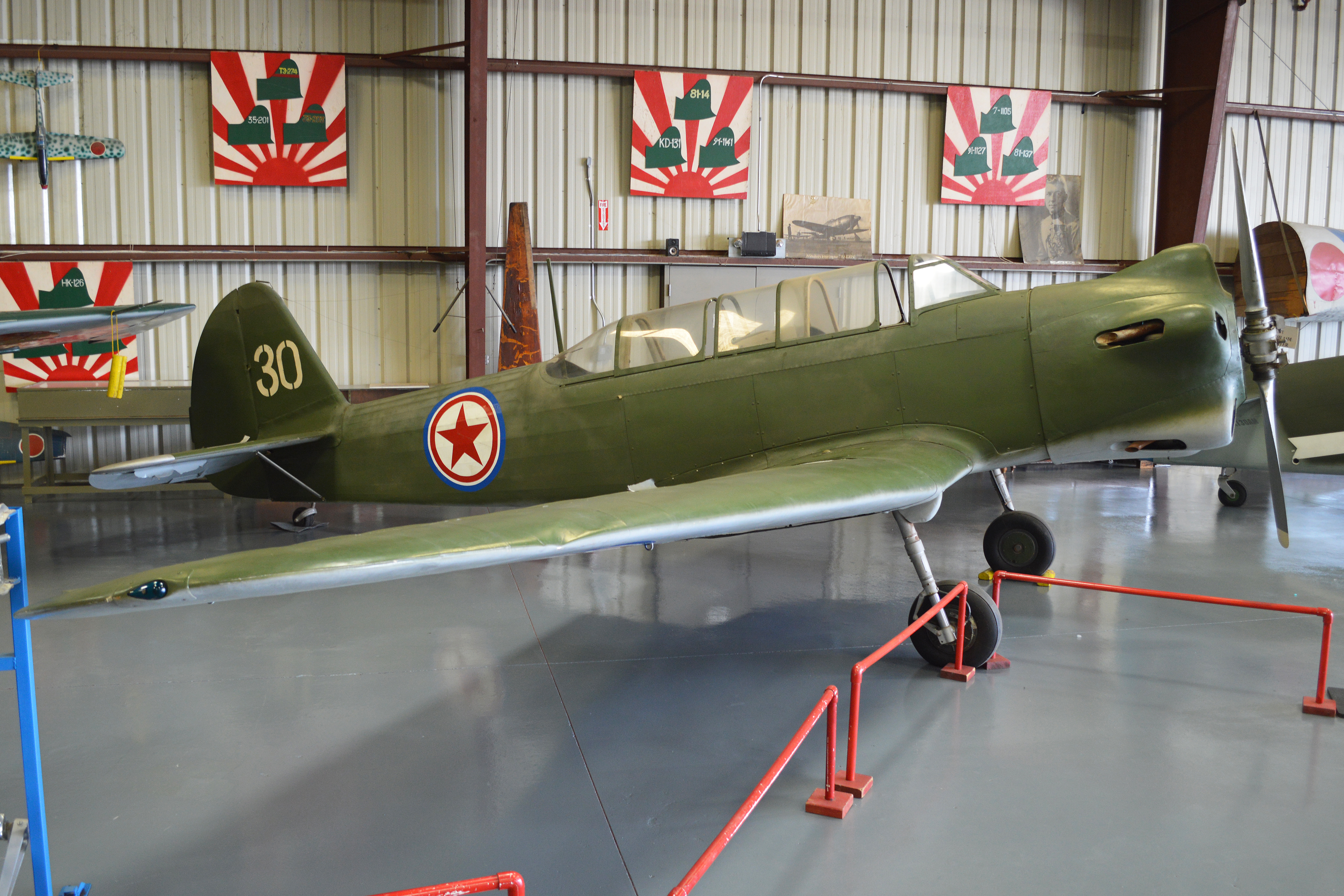
North Korean Air Force

Afghanistan

- Afghan Air Force − Supplied by the Soviet Union in 1957, retired

Albania

- Albanian Air Force (including Chinese CJ-6 variants). As of 2026, Yak-18 is retired from Albanian Air Force.

Algeria

- Algerian Air Force

Armenia

- Armenian Air Force

Austria

- Austrian Air Force − Donated by the Soviet Union in 1955, retired

Bulgaria

- Bulgarian Air Force − Retired

Cambodia

- Royal Cambodian Air Force
- Khmer Air Force

China

- People's Liberation Army Air Force − Retired, manufactured in China under the designation CJ-5.

Czechoslovakia

- Czechoslovak Air Force
- Czechoslovak National Security Guard

East Germany

- Air Forces of the National People's Army − Retired shortly after the German Reunification

Egypt

- Egyptian Air Force − Retired

Guinea

- Military of Guinea

Hungary

- Hungarian Air Force

Iraq

- Iraqi Air Force − Retired

Kazakhstan

- Kazakh Air Defense Forces − Operated 4 Yak-18 in 2011, retired

Laos

- Lao People's Liberation Army Air Force

Mali

- Air Force of Mali − 2 in 2011, non-operational

Mongolia

- Mongolian People's Air Force − Retired

North Korea

- North Korean Air Force − Supplied by the Soviet Union between 1948 and 1950, ten CJ-5 were operational in 2011

Poland

- Polish Air Force − Retired

Romania

- Romanian Air Force − Retired

Somalia

- Somali Air Corps

Soviet Union

- DOSAAF
- Soviet Air Force

Syria

- Syrian Air Force − Retired

Transnistria

- Military of Transnistria - 2

Turkmenistan

- Turkmenistan Air Force

Vietnam

- Vietnam People's Air Force

Yemen

- Yemen Air Force

Zambia

- Zambian Air Force

== Specifications (Yak-18A) ==
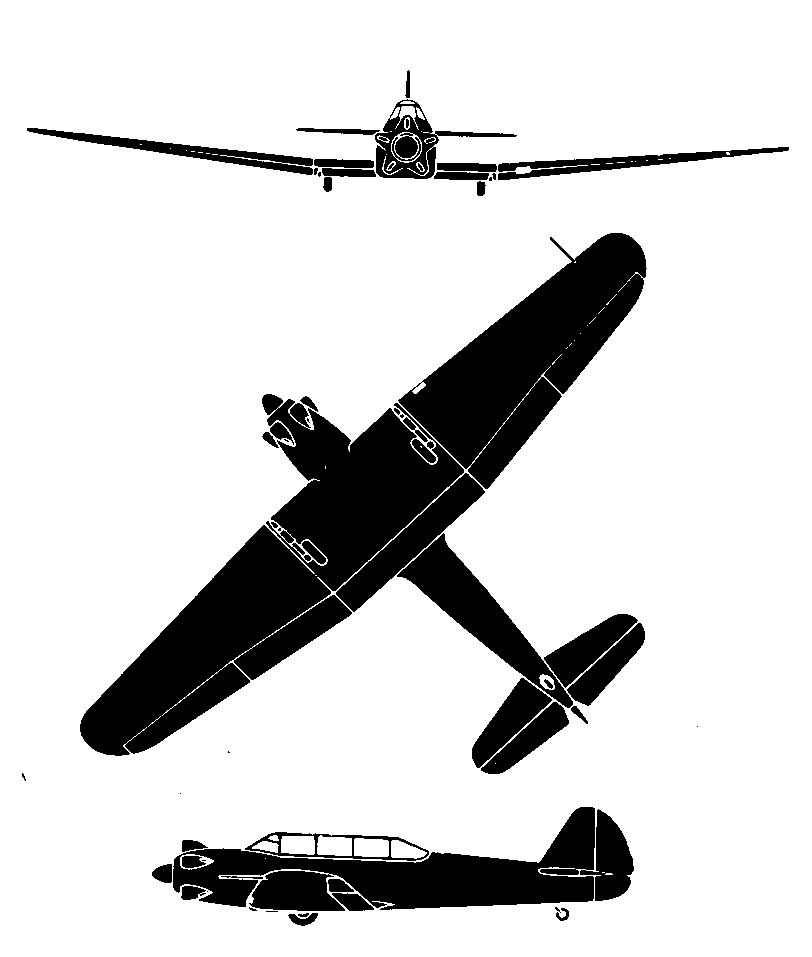
Yak-18 3-view drawing

Data from

General characteristics

- Crew: 2
- Length: 8.35 m (27 ft 5 in)
- Wingspan: 10.6 m (34 ft 9 in)
- Height: 3.35 m (11 ft 0 in)
- Wing area: 17.8 m^{2} (192 sq ft)
- Airfoil: root: Clark YH (14.5%); tip: Clark YH (9.3%)
- Empty weight: 1,025 kg (2,260 lb)
- Max takeoff weight: 1,320 kg (2,910 lb)
- Powerplant: 1 × Ivchenko AI-14RF 9-cylinder air-cooled radial piston engine, 224 kW (300 hp)
- Propellers: 2-bladed variable-pitch propeller

Performance

- Maximum speed: 300 km/h (190 mph, 160 kn)
- Range: 700 km (430 mi, 380 nmi)
- Service ceiling: 5,060 m (16,600 ft)

== See also ==
Related development

- Nanchang CJ-6
- Yakovlev Yak-20

Aircraft of comparable role, configuration, and era

- Zlin Trener
- LWD Junak
- de Havilland Canada DHC-1 Chipmunk
- Percival Prentice
- Ryan Navion

== Bibliography ==
- Wragg, David (23 February 2011). The World Air Power Guide. Casemate Publishers. ISBN 978-1-84468-784-8.
