= Isocossus vandeldeni =

Scientific classification
- Domain: Eukaryota
- Kingdom: Animalia
- Phylum: Arthropoda
- Class: Insecta
- Order: Lepidoptera
- Family: Blastobasidae
- Genus: Isocossus
- Species: I. vandeldeni

Binomial name
- Isocossus vandeldeni Roepke, 1957

Synonyms
- Cossus vandeldeni

Species of moth

Isocossus vandeldeni is a moth in the family Cossidae. It is found on Peninsular Malaysia, Sumatra and Borneo. The habitat consists of lowland forests.

The forewings are uniform striate bone-grey.
