= Isocossus rufipecten =

Scientific classification
- Kingdom: Animalia
- Phylum: Arthropoda
- Clade: Pancrustacea
- Class: Insecta
- Order: Lepidoptera
- Family: Blastobasidae
- Genus: Isocossus
- Species: I. rufipecten

Binomial name
- Isocossus rufipecten (Holloway, 1986)

Synonyms
- Cossus rufipecten Holloway, 1986

Species of moth

Isocossus rufipecten is a moth in the family Cossidae. It is found on Borneo and Sumatra. The habitat consists of lowland areas and lower montane forests.

The wingspan is 28–30 mm.
