= Isocossus =

Scientific classification
- Domain: Eukaryota
- Kingdom: Animalia
- Phylum: Arthropoda
- Class: Insecta
- Order: Lepidoptera
- Family: Blastobasidae
- Subfamily: Holcocerinae
- Tribe: Holcocerini
- Genus: Isocossus; Roepke, 1957

Genus of moths

Isocossus is a genus of moths in the family Cossidae.

== Species ==
- Isocossus cruciatus (Holloway, 1986)
- Isocossus retak (Holloway, 1986)
- Isocossus rufipecten (Holloway, 1986)
- Isocossus seria (Holloway, 1986)
- Isocossus stroehli Yakovlev, 2006
- Isocossus telisai (Holloway, 1986)
- Isocossus vandeldeni Roepke, 1957
- Isocossus zolotuhini Yakovlev, 2015
