= Isocossus cruciatus =

Scientific classification
- Kingdom: Animalia
- Phylum: Arthropoda
- Clade: Pancrustacea
- Class: Insecta
- Order: Lepidoptera
- Family: Blastobasidae
- Genus: Isocossus
- Species: I. cruciatus

Binomial name
- Isocossus cruciatus (Holloway, 1986)

Synonyms
- Cossus cruciatus Holloway, 1986

Species of moth

Isocossus cruciatus is a moth in the family Cossidae. It was first described by Jeremy Daniel Holloway in 1986 and is found on Borneo. The habitat consists of alluvial forests.

The wingspan is about 20 mm. The forewings are pale grey with blackish striae.
