= Technoavia SM-94 =

SM-94
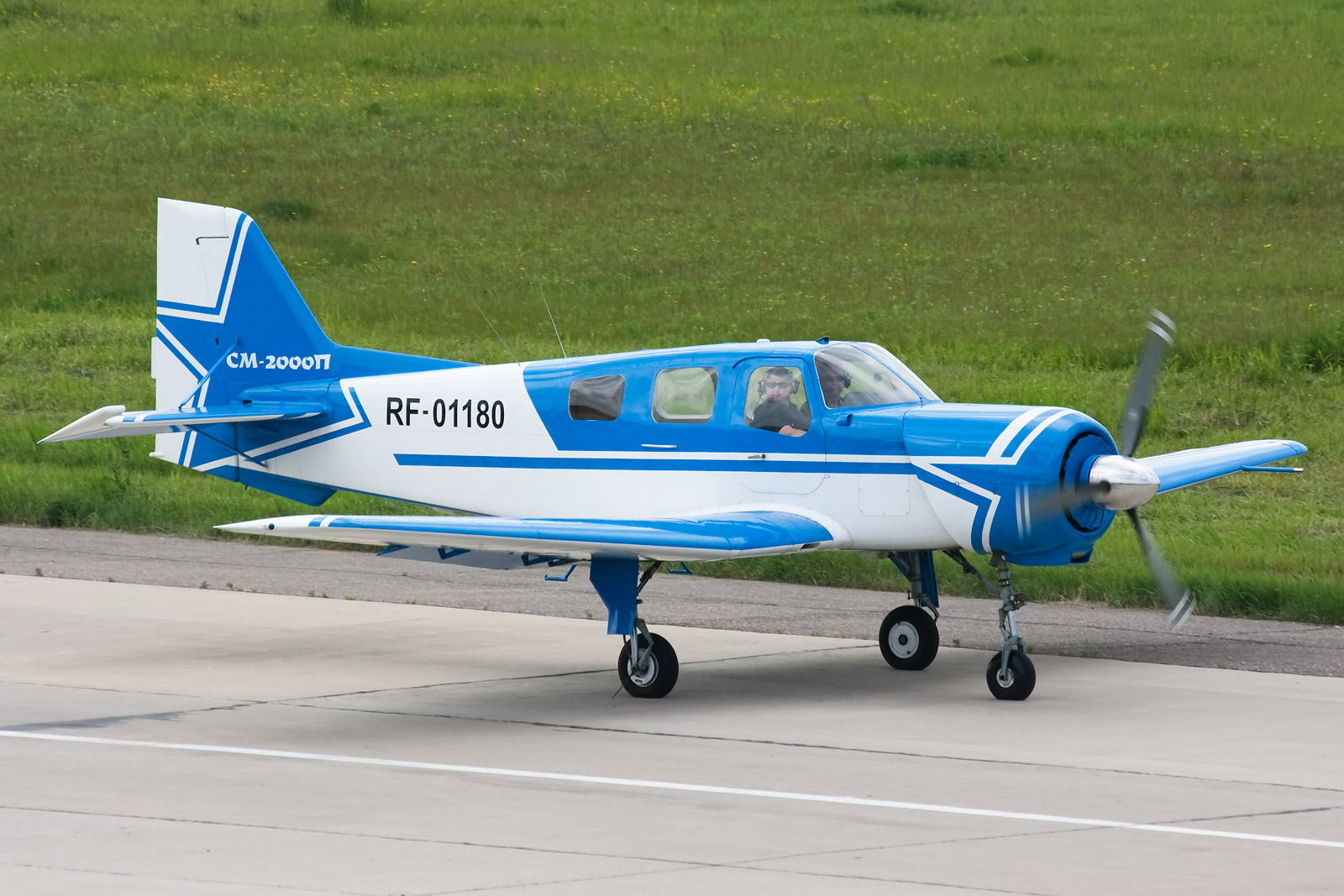
- Technoavia SM-2000P

General information
- Type: General aviation aircraft
- Manufacturer: Technoavia
- Number built: limited number of prototypes

History
- Developed from: Yakovlev Yak-18T

The Technoavia SM-94 series was developed in the early 1990s as a six-seat version of the Yakovlev Yak-18T, incorporating upgraded, modern avionics and aerodynamic refinements.

== Design and development ==
The main changes in the Technoavia SM-94 series, besides the increase in fuselage capacity, were including all-metal wings and empennage with all surfaces re-profiled to give a squarer appearance, a three-blade propeller, increased tankage and two-piece windscreen replacing the original multipane design.

== Operational history ==
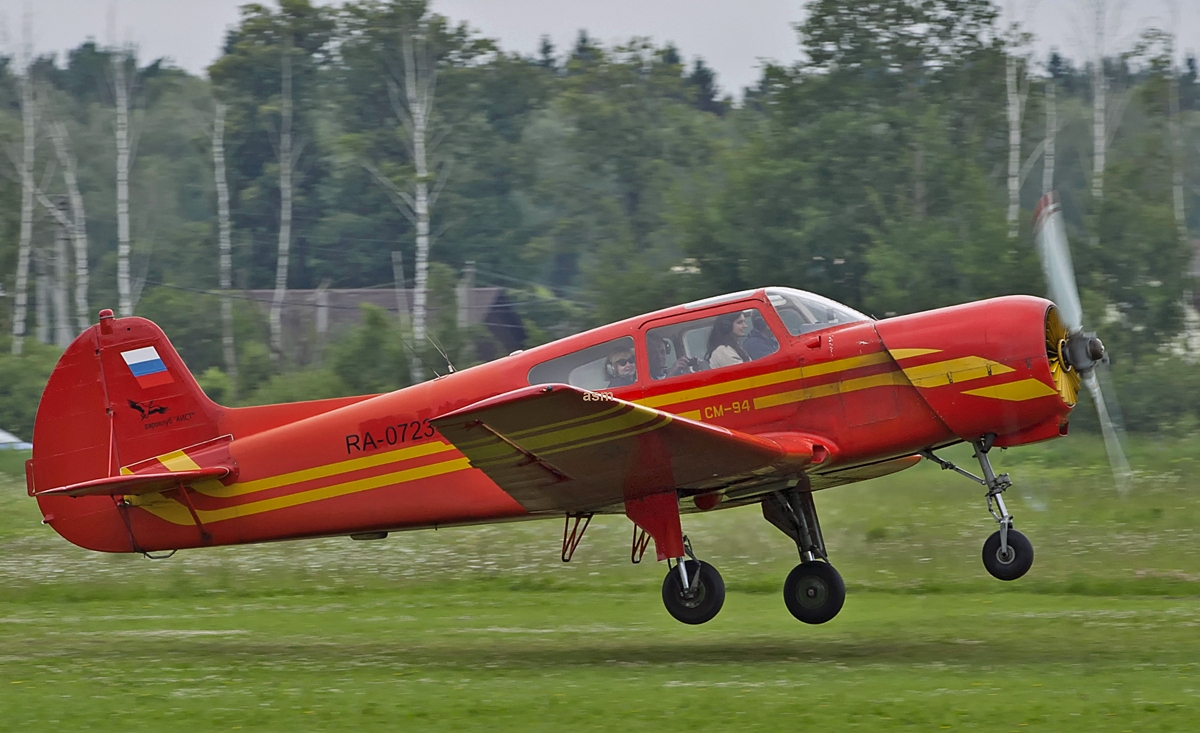
Technoavia SM-94

In 1997, the SM94-1 development aircraft (RA-44486) was shown at MAKS, Moscow, but series production was subsequently halted by financial concerns.

The Technoavia SM-94 was further developed into the SM-2000 series. The prototype SM-2000P made first flight 21 March 2002 and was displayed at MAKS '03.

Designation SM-2000P differentiates it from the further developed SM-2000 turboprop, that became a separate variant. Since 2006, no further developments have been announced.

== Specifications (SM-94) ==
Data from

General characteristics

- Length: 8.35 m (27 ft 5 in)
- Wingspan: 11.6 m (38 ft 1 in)
- Empty weight: 1,100 kg (2,425 lb)
- Max takeoff weight: 1,870 kg (4,123 lb)

Performance

- Maximum speed: 300 km/h (190 mph, 160 kn)
- Range: 1,350 km (840 mi, 730 nmi)
- Service ceiling: 5,500 m (18,000 ft)
