= Isocossus zolotuhini =

Scientific classification
- Kingdom: Animalia
- Phylum: Arthropoda
- Clade: Pancrustacea
- Class: Insecta
- Order: Lepidoptera
- Family: Blastobasidae
- Genus: Isocossus
- Species: I. zolotuhini

Binomial name
- Isocossus zolotuhini Yakovlev, 2015

Species of moth

Isocossus zolotuhini is a moth in the family Cossidae. It is found in central Vietnam.

The length of the forewings is about 24 mm, with wingspan of about 52 mm.

== Etymology ==
The species is named in honour of Russian lepidopterist Dr. Vadim Zolotuhin.
