= Neurocossus =

Scientific classification
- Kingdom: Animalia
- Phylum: Arthropoda
- Clade: Pancrustacea
- Class: Insecta
- Order: Lepidoptera
- Family: Cossidae
- Subfamily: Cossinae
- Genus: Neurocossus; Yakovlev, 2010

Genus of moths

Neurocossus is a genus of moths in the family Cossidae.

== Species ==
- Neurocossus khmer (Yakovlev, 2004)
- Neurocossus pinratanai (Yakovlev, 2004)
- Neurocossus speideli (Holloway, 1986)
