= Isocossus stroehli =

Scientific classification
- Kingdom: Animalia
- Phylum: Arthropoda
- Clade: Pancrustacea
- Class: Insecta
- Order: Lepidoptera
- Family: Blastobasidae
- Genus: Isocossus
- Species: I. stroehli

Binomial name
- Isocossus stroehli Yakovlev, 2006

Species of moth

Isocossus stroehli is a moth in the family Cossidae. It is found in Malaysia and on Sumatra.
