= Hollowiella =

Scientific classification
- Kingdom: Animalia
- Phylum: Arthropoda
- Clade: Pancrustacea
- Class: Insecta
- Order: Lepidoptera
- Family: Cossidae
- Subfamily: Cossinae
- Genus: Hollowiella; Yakovlev & Witt, 2009

Genus of insects

Hollowiella is a genus of moths in the family Cossidae.

== Species ==
- Hollowiella amasonca (Yakovlev, 2006)
- Hollowiella bajin Yakovlev & Witt, 2009
- Hollowiella chanwu Yakovlev & Witt, 2009
- Hollowiella rama (Yakovlev, 2006)
- Hollowiella xishuangbannaensis (I. Chou & B. Hua, 1986)
