= Neurocossus pinratanai =

Scientific classification
- Kingdom: Animalia
- Phylum: Arthropoda
- Clade: Pancrustacea
- Class: Insecta
- Order: Lepidoptera
- Family: Cossidae
- Genus: Neurocossus
- Species: N. pinratanai

Binomial name
- Neurocossus pinratanai (Yakovlev, 2004)

Synonyms
- Paracossus pinratanai Yakovlev, 2004

Species of moth

Neurocossus pinratanai is a moth in the family Cossidae. It is found in Thailand.
