= Yakovlev AIR-1 =

Soviet light biplane

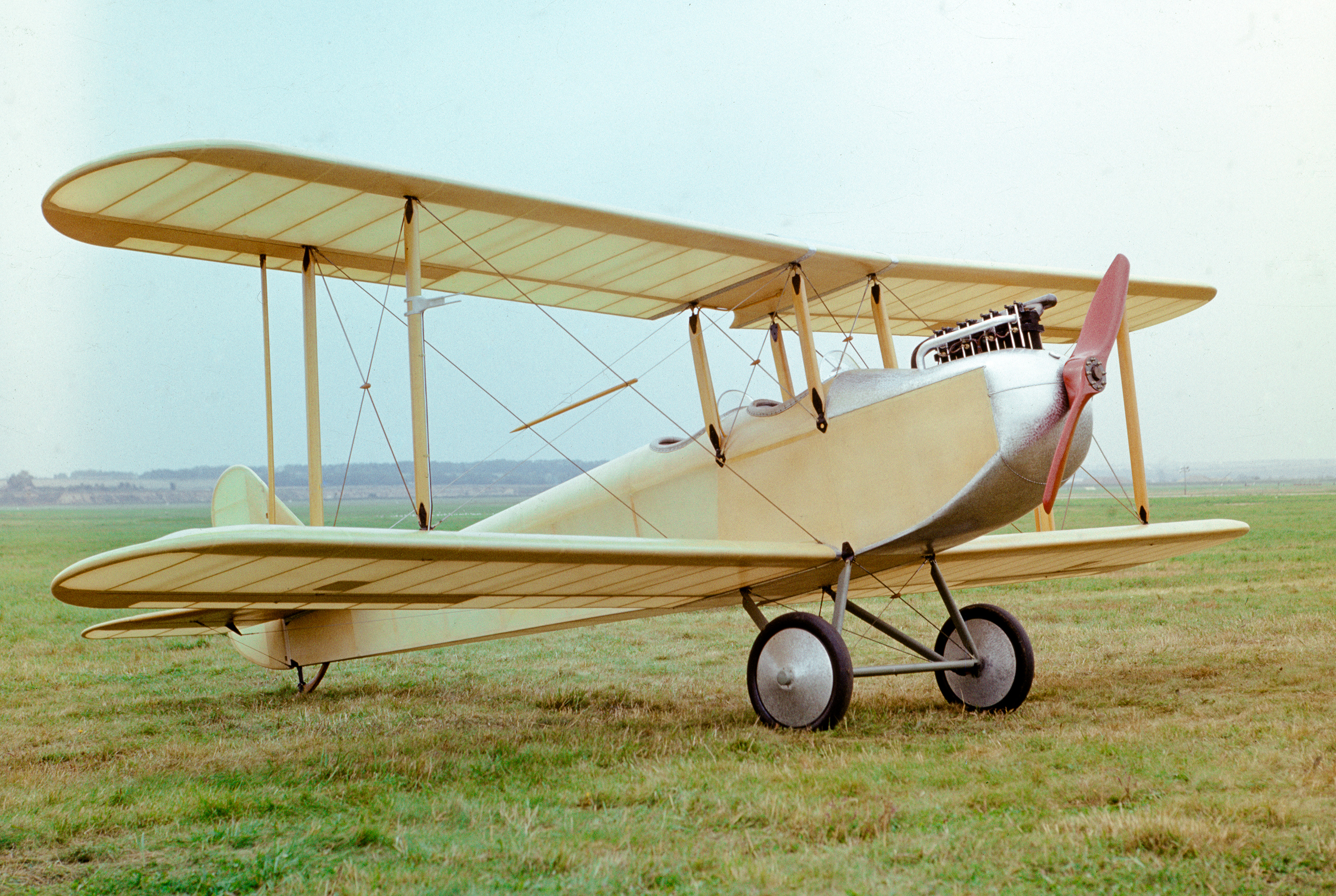
- The AIR-1, 1978

General information
- Type: Two-seat biplane
- National origin: Soviet Union
- Manufacturer: Yakovlev
- Designer: Aleksandr Sergeyevich Yakovlev
- Number built: 6+

History
- First flight: 12 May 1927

The Yakovlev AIR-1 (VVA-3) was a 1920s Soviet two-seat light biplane, the first aircraft designed and built by Aleksandr Sergeyevich Yakovlev.

== Development ==
Yakovlev designed his first aircraft while working at the Zhukovsky Military Aviation Academy; the aircraft was a two-seat light biplane powered by a 60 hp (45 kW) ADC Cirrus piston engine. The biplane was of wood and fabric construction. Although the directors of the academy were opposed to the design, the aircraft was built in the Academy Club on his own time. Originally designated VVA-3 (Military Aviation Academy-3) Yakovlev later redesignated it the AIR-1 in honour of Alexei Ivanovich Rykov, the country's premier (the Chairman of the Council of People's Commissars) and the president of the Osoviakihm.

The first flight on 12 May 1927 was flown by Yakovlev's friend Yulian Piontkovsky, who later rated the flying qualities as excellent; Piontkovsky later flew the aircraft non-stop from Sevastopol to Moscow in 15½ hours, a distance of 1,240 km (770 mi; 670 nmi). In 1928 Yakovlev produced an improved variant, the AIR-2; six were built between 1928 and 1931 fitted with different five-cylinder radial engines. One aircraft powered by a Siemens engine was designated AIR-2S and was fitted with floats designed by Vadim Shavrov.

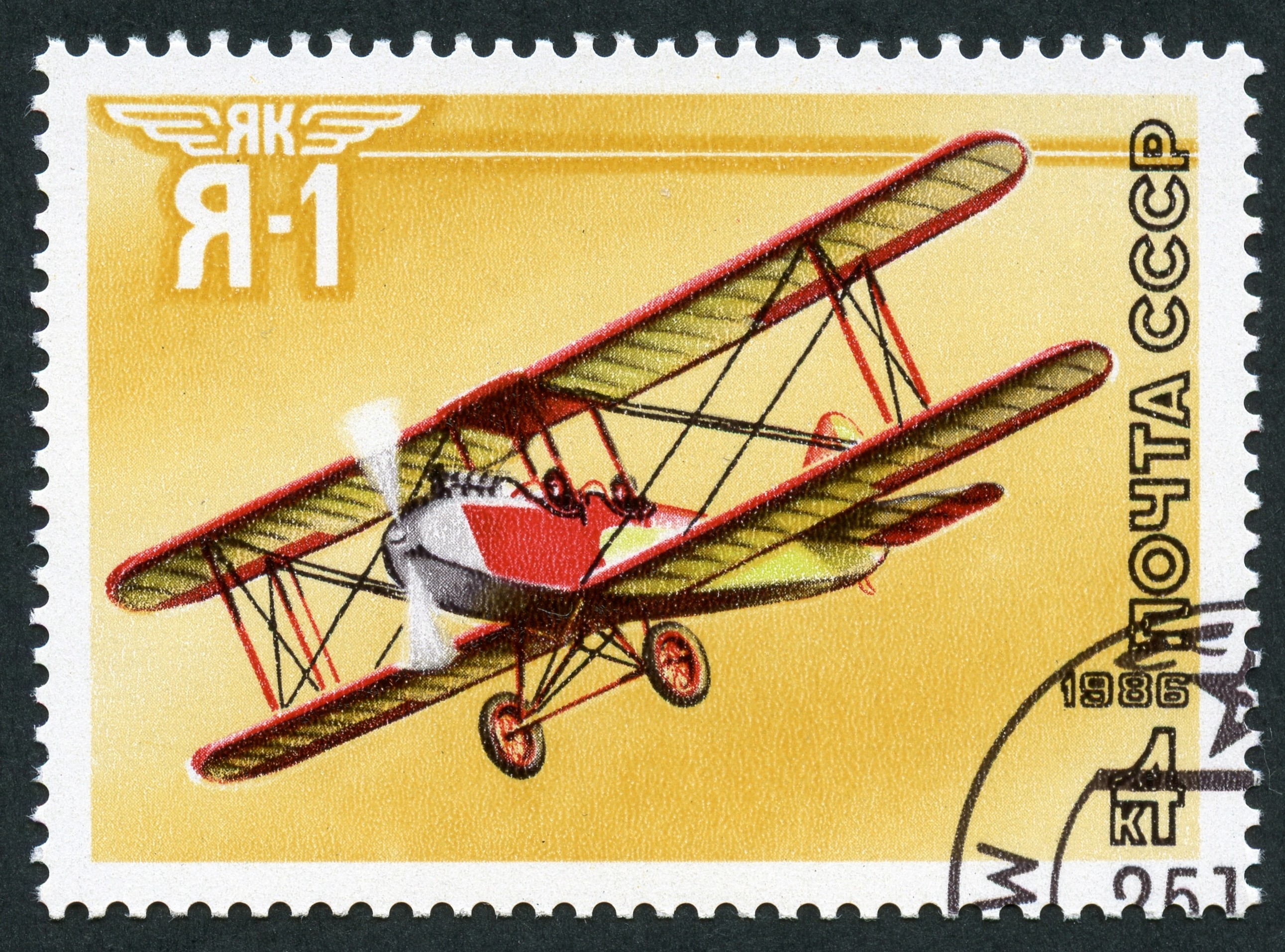
The AIR-1 depicted on a Russian stamp

== Variants ==
AIR-1
Prototype with a 60 hp (45 kW) ADC Cirrus engine.
AIR-2
Improved variant fitted with either a Siemens, Walter NZ-60 or NAMI M-23 radial engine.
AIR-2S
AIR-2 fitted with two wooden floats.
VVA-3
Original designation of the AIR-1

== Specifications (AIR-1) ==
Data from Istoriia konstruktsii samoletov v SSSR do 1938 g.

General characteristics

- Crew: two
- Length: 6.9 m (22 ft 8 in)
- Wingspan: 8.8 m (28 ft 10 in)
- Wing area: 18.7 m^{2} (201 sq ft)
- Airfoil: Göttingen 387
- Empty weight: 335 kg (739 lb)
- Gross weight: 535 kg (1,179 lb)
- Powerplant: 1 × ADC Cirrus four-cylinder inline engine, 45 kW (60 hp)

Performance

- Maximum speed: 140 km/h (87 mph, 76 kn)
- Range: 1,240 km (770 mi, 670 nmi)
- Service ceiling: 3,850 m (12,630 ft)
- Time to altitude: 8 minutes to 1,000 m (3,300 ft), 35 minutes to 3,000 m (9,800 ft)
