= Isocossus retak =

Scientific classification
- Kingdom: Animalia
- Phylum: Arthropoda
- Clade: Pancrustacea
- Class: Insecta
- Order: Lepidoptera
- Family: Blastobasidae
- Genus: Isocossus
- Species: I. retak

Binomial name
- Isocossus retak (Holloway, 1986)

Synonyms
- Cossus retak Holloway, 1986

Species of moth

Isocossus retak is a moth in the family Cossidae. It is found on Borneo. The habitat consists of upper montane forests.

The forewing is about 22 mm.
