= Hollowiella xishuangbannaensis =

Scientific classification
- Domain: Eukaryota
- Kingdom: Animalia
- Phylum: Arthropoda
- Class: Insecta
- Order: Lepidoptera
- Family: Cossidae
- Genus: Hollowiella
- Species: H. xishuangbannaensis

Binomial name
- Hollowiella xishuangbannaensis (Chou et Hua, 1986)

Synonyms
- Holcocerus xishuangbannaensis Chou et Hua, 1986; Paracossus xishuangbannaensis

Species of moth

Hollowiella xishuangbannaensis is a moth in the family Cossidae. It is found in China (Yunnan).
