= Hollowiella rama =

Scientific classification
- Kingdom: Animalia
- Phylum: Arthropoda
- Clade: Pancrustacea
- Class: Insecta
- Order: Lepidoptera
- Family: Cossidae
- Genus: Hollowiella
- Species: H. rama

Binomial name
- Hollowiella rama (Yakovlev, 2006)

Synonyms
- Paracossus rama Yakovlev, 2006

Species of moth

Hollowiella rama is a moth in the family Cossidae. It was described by Yakovlev in 2006. It is found in northern Thailand.

The length of the forewings is about 12 mm.
