= Isocossus seria =

Scientific classification
- Kingdom: Animalia
- Phylum: Arthropoda
- Clade: Pancrustacea
- Class: Insecta
- Order: Lepidoptera
- Family: Blastobasidae
- Genus: Isocossus
- Species: I. seria

Binomial name
- Isocossus seria (Holloway, 1986)

Synonyms
- Cossus seria Holloway, 1986

Species of moth

Isocossus seria is a moth in the family Cossidae. It is found on Borneo. The habitat consists of coastal areas.

The wingspan is 15 mm. The forewings are pale grey with blotchy brownish grey striae.
