= Isocossus telisai =

Scientific classification
- Kingdom: Animalia
- Phylum: Arthropoda
- Clade: Pancrustacea
- Class: Insecta
- Order: Lepidoptera
- Family: Blastobasidae
- Genus: Isocossus
- Species: I. telisai

Binomial name
- Isocossus telisai (Holloway, 1986)

Synonyms
- Cossus telisai Holloway, 1986

Species of moth

Isocossus telisai is a moth in the family Cossidae. It is found on Borneo. The habitat consists of lowland heath forests.

The wingspan is about 17 mm.
