= Neurocossus speideli =

Scientific classification
- Kingdom: Animalia
- Phylum: Arthropoda
- Clade: Pancrustacea
- Class: Insecta
- Order: Lepidoptera
- Family: Cossidae
- Genus: Neurocossus
- Species: N. speideli

Binomial name
- Neurocossus speideli (Holloway, 1986)

Synonyms
- Cossus speideli Holloway, 1986; Paracossus speideli

Species of moth

Neurocossus speideli is a moth in the family Cossidae. It is found on Peninsular Malaysia, Sumatra and Borneo.

The wingspan is 15–16 mm.
