= Alexander Yakovlev (engineer) =

Soviet aeronautical engineer

- Александр Яковлев
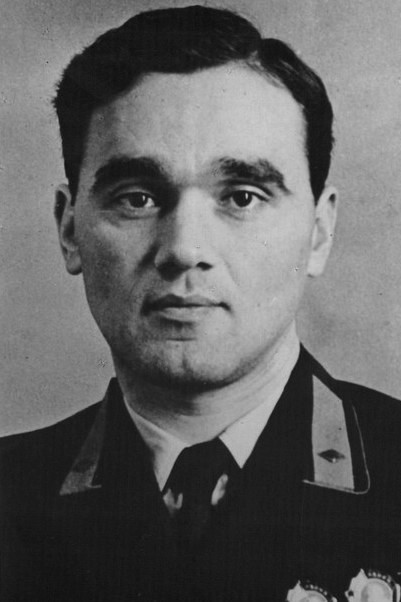
- Yakovlev in 1940
- Born: 1 April [O.S. 19 March] 1906; Moscow, Russian Empire
- Died: 22 August 1989 (aged 83); Moscow, Soviet Union
- Parent: Nina Vladimirovna
- Engineering career
- Discipline: Aeronautical Engineering
- Employer: Yakovlev design bureau

Signature
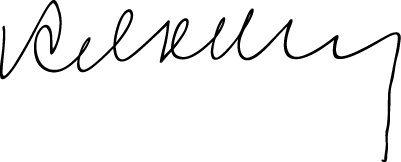

Alexander Sergeyevich Yakovlev (Russian: Алекса́ндр Серге́евич Я́ковлев; 1 April [O.S. 19 March] 1906 – 22 August 1989) was a Soviet aeronautical engineer. He designed the Yakovlev military aircraft and founded the Yakovlev Design Bureau. Yakovlev joined the Communist Party of the Soviet Union in 1938.

== Biography ==
Yakovlev was born in Moscow, where his father was an employee of the Nobel Brothers oil company. From 1919 to 1921, he worked as a part-time courier while still in school, and in 1922 he built his first model aeroplane as part of a school project. In 1924, he built a glider, the AVF-10, which made its first flight on 24 September 1924. The design won an award and secured him a position as a worker at the Zhukovsky Air Force Military Engineering Academy. However, his repeated attempts to gain admission to the Academy were denied due to his “lack of proletariat origins”. In 1927, Yakovlev designed the AIR-1 ultralight aircraft. This was the first of ten aircraft he designed between 1927 and 1933.

In 1927, Yakovlev finally gained admittance to the Academy and graduated in 1931. He was then assigned to the Moscow Aviation Plant No. 39, where his first design bureau of lightweight aviation was established in 1932. He became the main designer in 1935, then the chief designer (1956–1984) of aircraft for the Yakovlev Design Bureau.

The Yakovlev Design Bureau developed many fighter aircraft used by the Soviet Air Force during World War II. Particularly well known are the Yak-1, Yak-3, Yak-7 and Yak-9 as well as the Yak-6 transport. In 1945 Yakovlev designed one of the first Soviet aircraft with a jet engine, the Yak-15. He also designed the first Soviet all-weather interceptor, the Yak-25P, and the first Soviet supersonic bomber, the Yak-28. In the post-war period, Yakovlev was best known for the civilian airliner, the Yak-42, a three-engine medium-range aircraft, and numerous aerobatic models.

Yakovlev served under Joseph Stalin as a Vice-Minister of Aviation Industry between 1940 and 1946. Before the start of World War II, he made a number of trips abroad, including Italy, England and Germany, to study aircraft development in those countries. After the start of the war, he helped supervise the evacuation of aircraft factories to the east, and the production organisation, while continuing as head designer of his Bureau. He was also a correspondent member of the USSR Academy of Sciences in 1943. In 1946 he was awarded the title "General-Colonel of Aviation".

In 1976 Yakovlev became academician of the USSR Academy of Sciences. He was a deputy of the Supreme Soviet of the USSR (1946–1989). Yakovlev retired 21 August 1984. He was buried in the Novodevichy Cemetery in Moscow.

== Awards and honors ==
- Hero of Socialist Labour (1940, 1957)
- Lenin Prize (1972)
- Stalin Prize first degree (1941, 1942, 1943, 1946, 1947, 1948)
- USSR State Prize 1977)
- Order of Lenin (10 times)
- Order of the October Revolution
- Order of the Red Banner (twice)
- Order of Suvorov, I and II degree,
- Order of the Patriotic War of the I degree (twice)
- Order of the Red Banner of Labour
- Order of the Red Star
- Legion of Honor, Officer (France)
- Gold medal of the Fédération Aéronautique Internationale

== Memory ==
- A bronze bust of Yakovlev is installed in the Aviator Park in Moscow.
- Yakovlev's name is:
  - Design Bureau 115 (OKB 115);
  - Moscow Machine-building Plant "Speed";
  - Aircraft Designer Yakovlev Street (formerly 2nd Usievich Street) in the Airport area (since 2006) in the CAO of Moscow;
  - a street in Novorossiysk;
  - street in Ulan-Ude;
  - the street in Kopishche (Minsk district).

== See also ==
- List of Russian aerospace engineers
- Sergey Ilyushin
- Andrey Tupolev
- Oleg Antonov
