= Yakovlev =

Russian aerospace company

Yakovlev Design Bureau
- Formerly: OKB-115
- Type: Division
- Industry: Aerospace; Defense
- Founded: 15 January 1934; 92 years ago
- Founder: Alexander Sergeyevich Yakovlev
- Fate: merged into United Aircraft Corporation
- Headquarters: Moscow, Russia
- Products: civil and military aeroplanes
- Parent: Yakovlev Corporation
- Website: eng.yakovlev.ru

A.S. Yakovlev Design Bureau (/ˈjækoʊˌlɛf/; Russian: ОАО Опытно-конструкторское бюро им. А.С. Яковлева) is a Russian aircraft designer and manufacturer (design office prefix Yak). Its head office is in Aeroport District, Northern Administrative Okrug, Moscow. It is a subsidiary of Yakovlev Corporation.

== Overview ==
The bureau formed in 1934 under aircraft designer Alexander Sergeyevich Yakovlev as OKB-115 (the design bureau has its own production base at the facility No.115), but dates its birth from 12 May 1927, the day of maiden flight of the AIR-1 aircraft developed within the Department of Light Aircraft of GUAP (Head Agency of Aviation Industry) under the supervision of A.S. Yakovlev.

During World War II Yakovlev designed and produced a line of fighter aircraft such as the Yak-1 family of aircraft.

Irkut acquired Yakovlev in April 2004. The Russian government merged the holding company with Mikoyan, Ilyushin, Irkut, Sukhoi and Tupolev as a new company named United Aircraft Building Corporation in February 2006.

The firm designed the Pchela (Russian: Пчела, "bee") drone reconnaissance aircraft (first flown in 1990), but is perhaps best known for its highly successful line of World War II-era piston-engined fighter-aircraft.

In August 2023, Irkut Corporation rebranded itself as Yakovlev. The Sukhoi Superjet 100 was redesignated as the SJ-100, and the Irkut MC-21 also adopted the Yakovlev name.

Sanctions

The company was sanctioned by the Canadian government on 22 August 2023.

== See also ==
- List of military aircraft of the Soviet Union and the CIS
- List of Yakovlev aircraft
- SOKOL Aircraft Building Plant
