= Holcocerus =

Scientific classification
- Kingdom: Animalia
- Phylum: Arthropoda
- Class: Insecta
- Order: Lepidoptera
- Family: Blastobasidae
- Tribe: Holcocerini
- Genus: Holcocerus; Staudinger, 1884

Genus of moths

Holcocerus is a genus of moths in the family Cossidae.

== Species ==
- Holcocerus didmanidzae Yakovlev, 2006
- Holcocerus gloriosus (Erschoff, 1874)
- Holcocerus holosericeus (Staudinger, 1884)
- Holcocerus nobilis Staudinger, 1884
- Holcocerus reticuliferus Daniel, 1949
- Holcocerus rjabovi Yakovlev, 2006
- Holcocerus tancrei Püngeler, 1898
- Holcocerus witti Yakovlev, Saldaitis & Ivinskis, 2007
- Holcocerus zarudnyi Grum-Grshimailo, 1902

== Former species ==
- Holcocerus arenicola (Staudinger, 1879)
- Holcocerus beketi Yakovlev, 2004
- Holcocerus consobrinus Püngeler, 1898
- Holcocerus drangianicus Grum-Grshimailo, 1902
- Holcocerus ferrugineotinctus (Strand, 1913) (disputed)
- Holcocerus inspersus Christoph, 1887
- Holcocerus japonica (Gaede, 1929)
- Holcocerus kinabaluensis (Gaede, 1933)
- Holcocerus mongoliana Daniel, 1969
- Holcocerus pulverulentus Püngeler, 1898
- Holcocerus rufidorsius
- Holcocerus rungsi (Daniel & Witt, 1975)
- Holcocerus sericeus Grum-Grshimailo, 1890
- Holcocerus strioliger Alphéraky, 1893
- Holcocerus verbeeki (Roepke, 1957)
- Holcocerus volgensis Christoph, 1893
