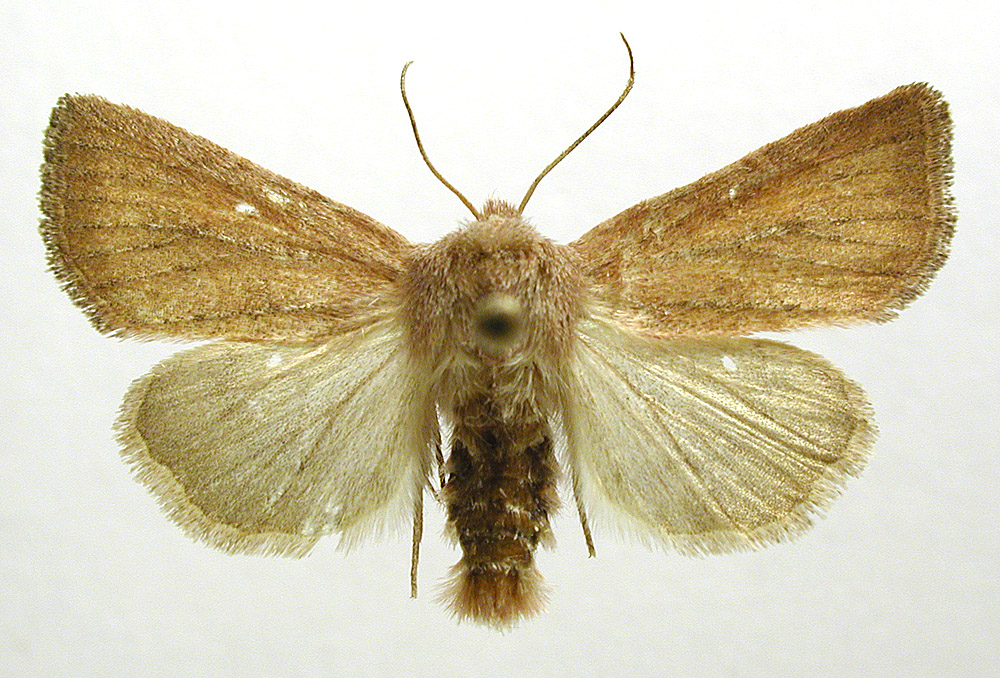
- Chortodes fluxus

Scientific classification
- Kingdom: Animalia
- Phylum: Arthropoda
- Class: Insecta
- Order: Lepidoptera
- Superfamily: Noctuoidea
- Family: Noctuidae
- Genus: Chortodes; Tutt, 1897

= Chortodes =

Genus of moths

Chortodes is a genus of moths of the family Noctuidae. The genus is considered a synonym of Photedes, and may be invalid.

== Species ==
- Chortodes dulcis (Oberthür, 1918)
- Chortodes extremus – concolorous (Hübner, [1809])
- Chortodes fluxus – mere wainscot (Hübner, [1809])
- Chortodes morrisii (Dale, 1837)

== Until recently placed here ==
- Denticucullus mabillei (D. Lucas, 1907) (previously Chortodes mabillei)
- Denticucullus pygmina – small wainscot (Haworth, 1809) (previously Chortodes pygmina or Chortodes pygminus)
