= Spartiniphaga =

Scientific classification
- Domain: Eukaryota
- Kingdom: Animalia
- Phylum: Arthropoda
- Class: Insecta
- Order: Lepidoptera
- Superfamily: Noctuoidea
- Family: Noctuidae
- Genus: Spartiniphaga; McDunnough, 1937

Genus of moths

Spartiniphaga was a genus of moths of the family Noctuidae. It is now considered to be a synonym of Photedes.

== Former species ==
- Spartiniphaga carterae is now Photedes carterae Schweitzer, 1983
- Spartiniphaga includens is now Photedes includens (Walker, 1858)
- Spartiniphaga inops is now Photedes inops (Grote, 1881)
- Spartiniphaga panatela is now Photedes panatela (Smith, 1904)
