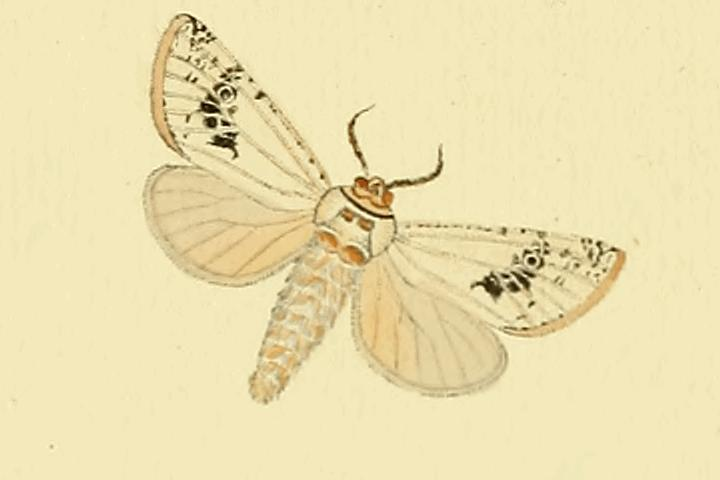
- Parahypopta caestrum

Scientific classification
- Domain: Eukaryota
- Kingdom: Animalia
- Phylum: Arthropoda
- Class: Insecta
- Order: Lepidoptera
- Family: Cossidae
- Subfamily: Cossulinae
- Genus: Parahypopta; Daniel, 1961

= Parahypopta =

Genus of moths

Parahypopta is a genus of moths in the family Cossidae.

== Species ==
- Parahypopta caestrum Hübner, 1804
- Parahypopta nigrosignata (Rothschild, 1912)
- Parahypopta radoti (Homberg, 1911)

== Former species ==
- Parahypopta issycus Gaede, 1933
- Parahypopta putridus Christoph, 1887
- Parahypopta sheljuzhkoi (Zukowsky, 1936)
