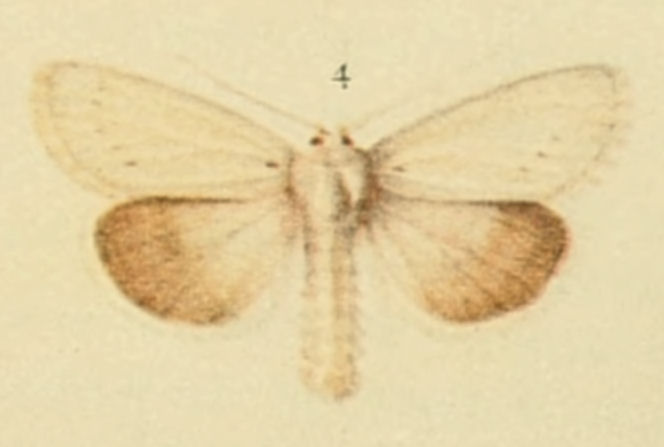
- Form bondii

Scientific classification
- Domain: Eukaryota
- Kingdom: Animalia
- Phylum: Arthropoda
- Class: Insecta
- Order: Lepidoptera
- Superfamily: Noctuoidea
- Family: Noctuidae
- Genus: Chortodes
- Species: C. morrisii

Binomial name
- Chortodes morrisii (Dale, 1837)

Synonyms
- Acosmetia morrisii Dale, 1837; Photedes morrisii; Nonagria bondii Knaggs, 1861; Tapinostola bondii; Tapinostola sohn-retheli Püngeler, 1907; signata Otto Sohn-Rethel, 1929

= Chortodes morrisii =

Species of moth

Chortodes morrisii, or Morris's wainscot, is a moth of the family Noctuidae.

It is found in western and southern Europe. In Britain it is limited to Devon and Dorset, while the form bondii, previously occurring in Kent, is thought to be extinct.

== Technical description and variation ==
A. morrisii Dale Larger than (Photedes extrema), chalk white, with faint grey dusting towards termen in the males; a curved series of black vein spots represents the outer line; no marginal spots; hindwing dark grey, paler in female; the fringe white; the abdomen is longer and thinner, the pectus and palpi smoother, less woolly, than in extrema. The wingspan is 26–34 mm.

== Biology ==
The moth flies in June and July.

The larvae feed on stems of tall fescue (Festuca arundinacea).

== Subspecies ==
- Chortodes morrisii morrisii
- Chortodes morrisii sohnretheli (Püngeler, 1907) (Italy, named in honour of Otto Sohn-Rethel)
- Chortodes morrisii bondii (Knaggs, 1861) (named after Frederick Bond)
