= Hypocoena =

Scientific classification
- Kingdom: Animalia
- Phylum: Arthropoda
- Class: Insecta
- Order: Lepidoptera
- Superfamily: Noctuoidea
- Family: Noctuidae
- Tribe: Apameini
- Genus: Hypocoena; Hampson, 1908

Genus of moths

Hypocoena is a genus of moths of the family Noctuidae.

== Species ==
- Hypocoena basistriga (McDunnough, 1933)
- Hypocoena inquinata (Guenée, 1852)
- Hypocoena rufostrigata (Packard, 1867)
- Hypocoena sofiae (Mustelin, 2006)
- Hypocoena stigmatica (Eversmann, 1855)

== Recent taxonomic changes ==
- Hypocoena enervata is now Photedes enervata (Guenée, 1852)
- Hypocoena defecta is now Photedes defecta (Grote, 1874)

Hypocoena orphnina is now considered a synonym of Hypocoena enervata. Hypocoena variana is now considered a synonym of Hypocoena inquinata.
