= Catocala kusnezovi =

Scientific classification
- Kingdom: Animalia
- Phylum: Arthropoda
- Class: Insecta
- Order: Lepidoptera
- Superfamily: Noctuoidea
- Family: Erebidae
- Genus: Catocala
- Species: C. kusnezovi

Binomial name
- Catocala kusnezovi Püngeler, 1914

Species of moth

Catocala kusnezovi is a moth in the family Erebidae first described by Rudolf Püngeler in 1914. It is found in Kazakhstan and Xinjiang, China.
