= Scopula fucata =

Scientific classification
- Domain: Eukaryota
- Kingdom: Animalia
- Phylum: Arthropoda
- Class: Insecta
- Order: Lepidoptera
- Family: Geometridae
- Genus: Scopula
- Species: S. fucata

Binomial name
- Scopula fucata (Püngeler, 1909)

Synonyms
- Acidalia fucata Püngeler, 1909; Scopuloides fucata; Scopula kirghisica Viidalepp, 1988

Species of geometer moth in subfamily Sterrhinae

Scopula fucata is a moth of the family Geometridae. It was described by Püngeler in 1909. It is endemic to Kyrgyzstan.
