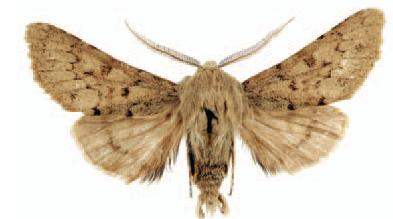
- Male
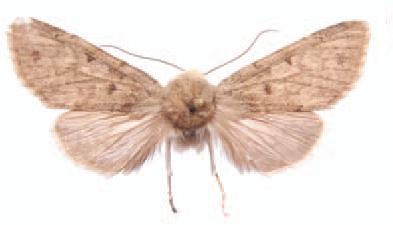
- Female

Scientific classification
- Domain: Eukaryota
- Kingdom: Animalia
- Phylum: Arthropoda
- Class: Insecta
- Order: Lepidoptera
- Superfamily: Noctuoidea
- Family: Noctuidae
- Genus: Pseudohadena
- Species: P. evanida

Binomial name
- Pseudohadena evanida Püngeler, 1914

Synonyms
- Pseudohadena (Jaxartia) evanida

= Pseudohadena evanida =

Species of moth

Pseudohadena evanida is a moth of the family Noctuidae. It is found in Central Asia, including Kazakhstan.

The wingspan is 44 mm. The forewings are light yellowish grey.

== Subspecies ==
- Pseudohadena evanida evanida
- Pseudohadena evanida psammoxantha Ronkay, Varga & Fábián, 1995
