= Holcocerus tancrei =

Scientific classification
- Domain: Eukaryota
- Kingdom: Animalia
- Phylum: Arthropoda
- Class: Insecta
- Order: Lepidoptera
- Family: Blastobasidae
- Genus: Holcocerus
- Species: H. tancrei

Binomial name
- Holcocerus tancrei Püngeler, 1898

Species of moth

Holcocerus tancrei is a moth in the family Cossidae. It is found in Iran, Afghanistan, Turkmenistan and Uzbekistan. The habitat consists of deserts.
