= Cossulus stertzi =

Scientific classification
- Domain: Eukaryota
- Kingdom: Animalia
- Phylum: Arthropoda
- Class: Insecta
- Order: Lepidoptera
- Family: Cossidae
- Genus: Cossulus
- Species: C. stertzi

Binomial name
- Cossulus stertzi (Püngeler, 1899)

Synonyms
- Cossus stertzi Püngeler, 1899; Cossulinus stertzi; Holcocerus strigillata Rothschild, 1912

Species of moth

Cossulus stertzi is a moth in the family Cossidae. It is found in Afghanistan, Kyrgyzstan and Tajikistan.
