= Deserticossus praeclarus =

Scientific classification
- Domain: Eukaryota
- Kingdom: Animalia
- Phylum: Arthropoda
- Class: Insecta
- Order: Lepidoptera
- Family: Cossidae
- Genus: Deserticossus
- Species: D. praeclarus

Binomial name
- Deserticossus praeclarus (Püngeler, 1898)

Synonyms
- Holcocerus praeclarus Püngeler, 1898

Species of moth

Deserticossus praeclarus is a moth in the family Cossidae. It is found in Turkmenistan. The habitat consists of deserts.

The length of the forewings is 16–25 mm. Adults have been recorded on wing in May.
