= Deserticossus pullus =

Scientific classification
- Kingdom: Animalia
- Phylum: Arthropoda
- Clade: Pancrustacea
- Class: Insecta
- Order: Lepidoptera
- Family: Cossidae
- Genus: Deserticossus
- Species: D. pullus

Binomial name
- Deserticossus pullus (Chua, Chou, Fang & Chen, 1990)

Synonyms
- Holcocerus pullus Chua, Chou, Fang & Chen, 1990

Species of moth

Deserticossus pullus is a moth in the family Cossidae. It is found in China (Xinjiang).

The wingspan is about 33 mm.
