= Barchaniella =

Scientific classification
- Kingdom: Animalia
- Phylum: Arthropoda
- Clade: Pancrustacea
- Class: Insecta
- Order: Lepidoptera
- Family: Cossidae
- Subfamily: Cossinae
- Genus: Barchaniella; Yakovlev, 2006

Genus of moths

Barchaniella is a genus of moths in the family Cossidae.

== Species ==
- Barchaniella inspersus (Christoph, 1887)
- Barchaniella mus (Grum-Grshimailo, 1902)
- Barchaniella sacara (Grum-Grshimailo, 1902)

== Etymology ==
The genus name is derived from Turkik barkhan (meaning a motile sand hill with a crescent shape).
