= Holcocerus gloriosus =

Scientific classification
- Domain: Eukaryota
- Kingdom: Animalia
- Phylum: Arthropoda
- Class: Insecta
- Order: Lepidoptera
- Family: Blastobasidae
- Genus: Holcocerus
- Species: H. gloriosus

Binomial name
- Holcocerus gloriosus (Erschoff, 1874)

Synonyms
- Hypopta gloriosus Erschoff, 1874; Holcocerus puengeleri Rothschild, 1912; Holcocerus laudabilis Staudinger, 1899

Species of moth

Holcocerus gloriosus is a species of moth of the family Cossidae. It is found in Turkmenistan, Uzbekistan, southern Kazakhstan, Iran, Afghanistan, Iraq, Jordan, Israel, northern Egypt, Saudi Arabia, Bahrain and Oman. The habitat consists of deserts.

The length of the forewings is 12–20 mm for males and 16–21 mm for females. The forewings are white with a small brown points at the veins. The hindwings are white. Adults have been recorded on wing from February to May in Israel.

== Subspecies ==
- Holcocerus gloriosus gloriosus
- Holcocerus gloriosus laudabilis Staudinger, 1899 (Jordan, Israel, Egypt: Sinai, Saudi Arabia, Oman, Bahrain)
- Holcocerus gloriosus mesopotamicus Watkins & Buxton, 1921 (Iran, Iraq, southern Afghanistan)
