= Cossulus nycteris =

Scientific classification
- Domain: Eukaryota
- Kingdom: Animalia
- Phylum: Arthropoda
- Class: Insecta
- Order: Lepidoptera
- Family: Cossidae
- Genus: Cossulus
- Species: C. nycteris

Binomial name
- Cossulus nycteris (John, 1923)

Synonyms
- Hypopta nycteris John, 1923

Species of moth in Uzbekistan

Cossulus nycteris is a moth in the family Cossidae. It is found in Uzbekistan.
