= Holcocerus reticuliferus =

Scientific classification
- Domain: Eukaryota
- Kingdom: Animalia
- Phylum: Arthropoda
- Class: Insecta
- Order: Lepidoptera
- Family: Blastobasidae
- Genus: Holcocerus
- Species: H. reticuliferus

Binomial name
- Holcocerus reticuliferus Daniel, 1949

Species of moth

Holcocerus reticuliferus is a moth in the family Cossidae. It is found in Uzbekistan.
