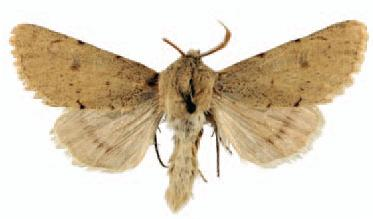
- Male
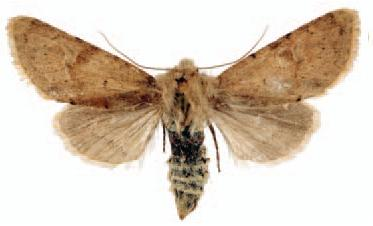
- Female

Scientific classification
- Domain: Eukaryota
- Kingdom: Animalia
- Phylum: Arthropoda
- Class: Insecta
- Order: Lepidoptera
- Superfamily: Noctuoidea
- Family: Noctuidae
- Genus: Pseudohadena
- Species: P. pseudamoena

Binomial name
- Pseudohadena pseudamoena (Boursin, 1943)

Synonyms
- Pseudopseustis pseudamoena Boursin, 1943; Pseudohadena (Jaxartia) pseudamoena

= Pseudohadena pseudamoena =

Species of moth

Pseudohadena pseudamoena is a moth of the family Noctuidae. It is found in Armenia and Iran.
