= Cossulus nikiforoviorum =

Scientific classification
- Kingdom: Animalia
- Phylum: Arthropoda
- Clade: Pancrustacea
- Class: Insecta
- Order: Lepidoptera
- Family: Cossidae
- Genus: Cossulus
- Species: C. nikiforoviorum

Binomial name
- Cossulus nikiforoviorum Yakovlev, 2006

Species of moth

Cossulus nikiforoviorum is a moth in the family Cossidae. It is found in Uzbekistan.

The length of the forewings is 14–15 mm.
