= Cossulus darvazi =

Scientific classification
- Domain: Eukaryota
- Kingdom: Animalia
- Phylum: Arthropoda
- Class: Insecta
- Order: Lepidoptera
- Family: Cossidae
- Genus: Cossulus
- Species: C. darvazi

Binomial name
- Cossulus darvazi Sheljuzhko, 1943

Synonyms
- Cossulinus argentatus darvazi Sheljuzhko, 1943

Species of moth

Cossulus darvazi is a moth in the family Cossidae. It is found in Tajikistan.
