= Cossulus kabulense =

Scientific classification
- Domain: Eukaryota
- Kingdom: Animalia
- Phylum: Arthropoda
- Class: Insecta
- Order: Lepidoptera
- Family: Cossidae
- Genus: Cossulus
- Species: C. kabulense

Binomial name
- Cossulus kabulense (Daniel, 1965)

Synonyms
- Cossulinus kabulense Daniel, 1965

Species of moth

Cossulus kabulense is a moth in the family Cossidae. It is found in Afghanistan.
