= Vartiania zaratustra =

Scientific classification
- Kingdom: Animalia
- Phylum: Arthropoda
- Clade: Pancrustacea
- Class: Insecta
- Order: Lepidoptera
- Family: Cossidae
- Genus: Vartiania
- Species: V. zaratustra

Binomial name
- Vartiania zaratustra Yakovlev, 2004

Species of moth

Vartiania zaratustra is a moth in the family Cossidae. It is found in Iran, Iraq and Oman.
