= Deserticossus artemisiae =

Scientific classification
- Domain: Eukaryota
- Kingdom: Animalia
- Phylum: Arthropoda
- Class: Insecta
- Order: Lepidoptera
- Family: Cossidae
- Genus: Deserticossus
- Species: D. artemisiae

Binomial name
- Deserticossus artemisiae (Chou et Hua, 1986)

Synonyms
- Holcocerus artemisiae Chou et Hua, 1986

Species of moth

Deserticossus artemisiae is a moth in the family Cossidae. It is found in China (Inner Mongolia, Shansi).
