= Cossulus nasreddin =

Scientific classification
- Kingdom: Animalia
- Phylum: Arthropoda
- Clade: Pancrustacea
- Class: Insecta
- Order: Lepidoptera
- Family: Cossidae
- Genus: Cossulus
- Species: C. nasreddin

Binomial name
- Cossulus nasreddin Yakovlev, 2006

Species of moth

Cossulus nasreddin is a moth in the family Cossidae. It is found in Uzbekistan.
