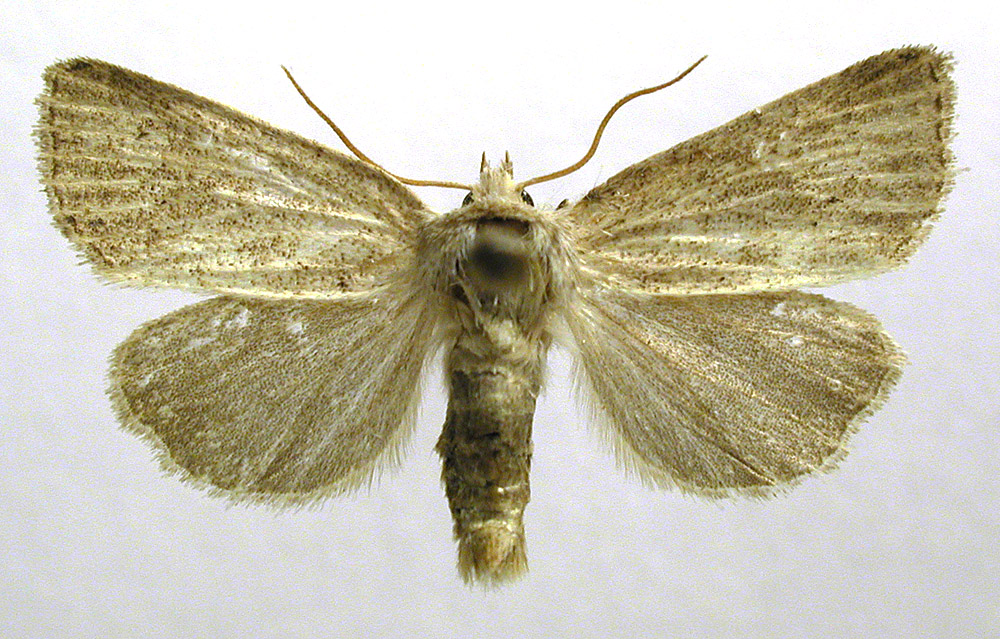

Scientific classification
- Kingdom: Animalia
- Phylum: Arthropoda
- Clade: Pancrustacea
- Class: Insecta
- Order: Lepidoptera
- Superfamily: Noctuoidea
- Family: Noctuidae
- Genus: Photedes
- Species: P. extrema

Binomial name
- Photedes extrema (Hübner, 1809)

Synonyms
- Noctua extrema Hübner, 1809; Chortodes extremus (Hübner, 1809); Photedes extremus (Hübner, 1809)

= Photedes extrema =

Species of moth

Photedes extrema, the concolorous, is a moth of the family Noctuidae. The species was first described by Jacob Hübner in 1809. It is found in most of Europe (except Iceland, Ireland, the Iberian Peninsula, Norway, Italy, Bulgaria and Greece).

== Technical description and variation ==
A. extrema Hbn. (= concolor Guen.) (49 g). Forewing bone white slightly dusted with grey, with no markings except the outer, much curved, row of dark vein spots and some black terminal spots; hindwing pale grey; in shape of forewing agreeing with fluxa Tr. The wingspan is 26–28 mm.

== Biology ==
Adults are on wing from June to July. Whereas Chortodes fluxa and Denticucullus pygmina appear only in August and September respectively. The larvae feed internally on the stems of Calamagrostis species.
