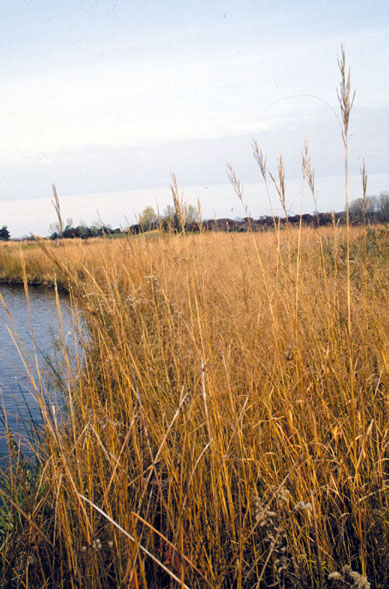
- Cordgrass along a pond edge

Conservation status
- Secure (NatureServe)

Scientific classification
- Kingdom: Plantae
- Clade: Tracheophytes
- Clade: Angiosperms
- Clade: Monocots
- Clade: Commelinids
- Order: Poales
- Family: Poaceae
- Subfamily: Chloridoideae
- Genus: Sporobolus
- Section: S. sect. Spartina
- Species: S. michauxianus

Binomial name
- Sporobolus michauxianus (Hitchc.) P.M.Peterson & Saarela

Synonyms
- List: Spartina cynosuroides var. michauxiana (Hitchc.) St.-Yves; Spartina michauxiana Hitchc.; Spartina cynosuroides f. major St.-Yves; Spartina michauxiana var. suttiei Farw.; Spartina michauxiana var. tenuior Farw.; Spartina pectinata Bosc ex Link; Spartina pectinata var. suttiei (Farw.) Fernald; Spartina pectinata f. variegata Vict.

= Sporobolus michauxianus =

Species of grass

Sporobolus michauxianus is a species of grass known as prairie cordgrass, freshwater cordgrass, tall marshgrass, and sloughgrass. It is native to much of North America, including central and eastern Canada and most of the contiguous United States except for the southwestern and southeastern regions. Its distribution extends into Mexico. It is also present on other continents as an introduced species.

== Description ==
This species of grass has hard, sturdy, hollow stems that may reach 3 m (9.8 ft) in height. They grow from a network of woody rhizomes and tough roots that form a sod. The roots penetrate over 3 m (9.8 ft) into the soil. The leaves have sharp, serrated edges. The panicle may be up to 50 cm (20 in) long and may have many branches. Each spikelet is up to 2.5 cm (0.98 in) in length. This grass can spread via its rhizome, producing large monotypic stands. There is currently ongoing debate whether to change the taxon of Spartina to Sporobolus due to DNA-based phylogenetic studies; however, the matter remains unresolved with some groups adopting a new, subjective name rather than the historical nomenclature priority of Spartina. This outstanding debate has created several papers defending precedence of Spartina as a taxon over Sporobolus as a distinctly subjective name change.

== Habitat and ecology ==
This species can grow in a variety of habitat types, but it is a facultative wetland species, most often found in wet habitats. These include fens, wet prairies, rivers, floodplains, ponds, moraines, and marshes. The grass is tolerant of water, but it does not tolerate prolonged flooding. Its dense root network stabilizes soil, even in areas where it would be eroded by flowing water.

The larvae of Photedes inops host on Sporobolus michauxianus, apparently exclusively.

== Uses ==
Livestock may graze on this plant when it is young, but once it matures it becomes very coarse and unpalatable.

This species has been investigated as a possible source of biofuel.

Prairie cordgrass when sown in combination with Virginia wildrye has shown promise in competing with the invasive and vigorous Japanese Knotweed.
