= Cossulus turcomanica =

Scientific classification
- Domain: Eukaryota
- Kingdom: Animalia
- Phylum: Arthropoda
- Class: Insecta
- Order: Lepidoptera
- Family: Cossidae
- Genus: Cossulus
- Species: C. turcomanica

Binomial name
- Cossulus turcomanica (Christoph, 1893)

Synonyms
- Hypopta turcomanicus Christoph, 1893; Cossulus turcomanicus; Cossulinus turkomanica alba Daniel, 1971

Species of moth

Cossulus turcomanica is a moth in the family Cossidae. It is found in Afghanistan and Turkmenistan.

== Subspecies ==
- Cossulus turcomanica turcomanica (Turkmenistan)
- Cossulus turcomanica albus (Daniel, 1971) (Afghanistan)
