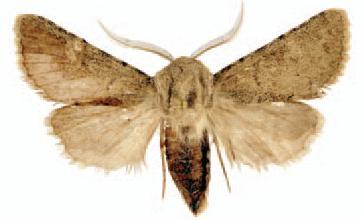
- Male
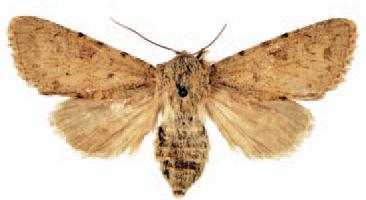
- Female

Scientific classification
- Domain: Eukaryota
- Kingdom: Animalia
- Phylum: Arthropoda
- Class: Insecta
- Order: Lepidoptera
- Superfamily: Noctuoidea
- Family: Noctuidae
- Genus: Pseudohadena
- Species: P. anatine

Binomial name
- Pseudohadena anatine Pekarsky, 2012

Synonyms
- Pseudohadena (Jaxartia) anatine

= Pseudohadena anatine =

Species of moth

Pseudohadena anatine is a moth of the family Noctuidae. It is found on the Ustyurt plateau in south-western Kazakhstan.

The wingspan is 39–40 mm for males and about 47 mm for females. The forewing wing pattern is very indistinct, the basal and subbasal lines are marked as costal spots only. The hindwings are pale, shining beige grey. The transverse line is present and the discal spot is pale but usually recognisable.

== Etymology ==
The species name refers to the duck-like shape of the clasper.
