= Holcocerus zarudnyi =

Scientific classification
- Domain: Eukaryota
- Kingdom: Animalia
- Phylum: Arthropoda
- Class: Insecta
- Order: Lepidoptera
- Family: Blastobasidae
- Genus: Holcocerus
- Species: H. zarudnyi

Binomial name
- Holcocerus zarudnyi Grum-Grshimailo, 1902

Species of moth

Holcocerus zarudnyi is a moth in the family Cossidae. It is found in southern Iran.
