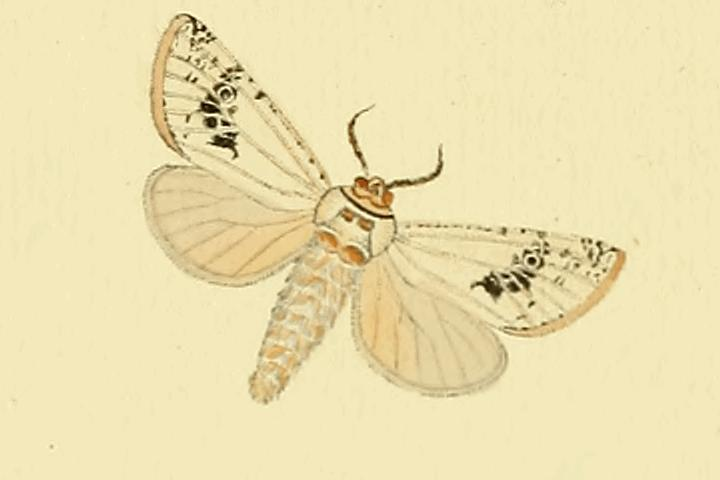

Scientific classification
- Kingdom: Animalia
- Phylum: Arthropoda
- Class: Insecta
- Order: Lepidoptera
- Family: Cossidae
- Genus: Parahypopta
- Species: P. caestrum

Binomial name
- Parahypopta caestrum (Hübner, 1804)

Synonyms
- Bombyx caestrum Hübner, 1804; Cossus teredon Boisduval, 1829; Hypopta caestrum var. caucasica Grum-Grshimailo, 1902; Cossus caestrum var. deserta Fischer von Waldheim, 1832

= Parahypopta caestrum =

Species of moth

Parahypopta caestrum is a species of moth of the family Cossidae. It is found on the Iberian Peninsula and in France, Italy, Austria, the Czech Republic, Slovakia, Hungary, on the Balkan Peninsula, as well as in Jordan, Israel, Syria, Iraq, Turkey, south-western Russia and Kazakhstan.

The wingspan is 28–40 mm. Adults have been recorded on wing in June and July.

The larvae feed on Asparagus officinalis, Asparagus maritime, Asparagus tenuifolis, Asparagus albus, Asparagus acutifolis, and Celtis australis.

== Subspecies ==
- Parahypopta caestrum caestrum
- Parahypopta caestrum caucasica (Grum-Grshimailo, 1902) (Caucasus, Transcaucasia)
