= Pseudohadena vulnerea =

Scientific classification
- Kingdom: Animalia
- Phylum: Arthropoda
- Class: Insecta
- Order: Lepidoptera
- Superfamily: Noctuoidea
- Family: Noctuidae
- Genus: Pseudohadena
- Species: P. vulnerea

Binomial name
- Pseudohadena vulnerea (Grote, 1883)

Species of moth

Pseudohadena vulnerea is a species of cutworm or dart moth in the family Noctuidae. It is found in North America.

The MONA or Hodges number for Pseudohadena vulnerea is 9577.
