= Cossulus irani =

Scientific classification
- Domain: Eukaryota
- Kingdom: Animalia
- Phylum: Arthropoda
- Class: Insecta
- Order: Lepidoptera
- Family: Cossidae
- Genus: Cossulus
- Species: C. irani

Binomial name
- Cossulus irani (Daniel, 1937)

Synonyms
- Cossus irani Daniel, 1937

Species of moth

Cossulus irani is a moth in the family Cossidae. It is found in Iran.
