= Holcocerus witti =

Scientific classification
- Kingdom: Animalia
- Phylum: Arthropoda
- Clade: Pancrustacea
- Class: Insecta
- Order: Lepidoptera
- Family: Blastobasidae
- Genus: Holcocerus
- Species: H. witti

Binomial name
- Holcocerus witti Yakovlev, Saldaitis & Ivinskis, 2007

Species of moth

Holcocerus witti is a species of moth in the family Cossidae. It was described by Yakovlev, Saldaitis and Ivinskis in 2007. It is found in north-western Iran.
