= Deserticossus curdus =

Scientific classification
- Kingdom: Animalia
- Phylum: Arthropoda
- Clade: Pancrustacea
- Class: Insecta
- Order: Lepidoptera
- Family: Cossidae
- Genus: Deserticossus
- Species: D. curdus

Binomial name
- Deserticossus curdus Yakovlev, 2006

Species of moth

Deserticossus curdus is a moth in the family Cossidae. It is found in Iraq.

The length of the forewings is about 20 mm.
