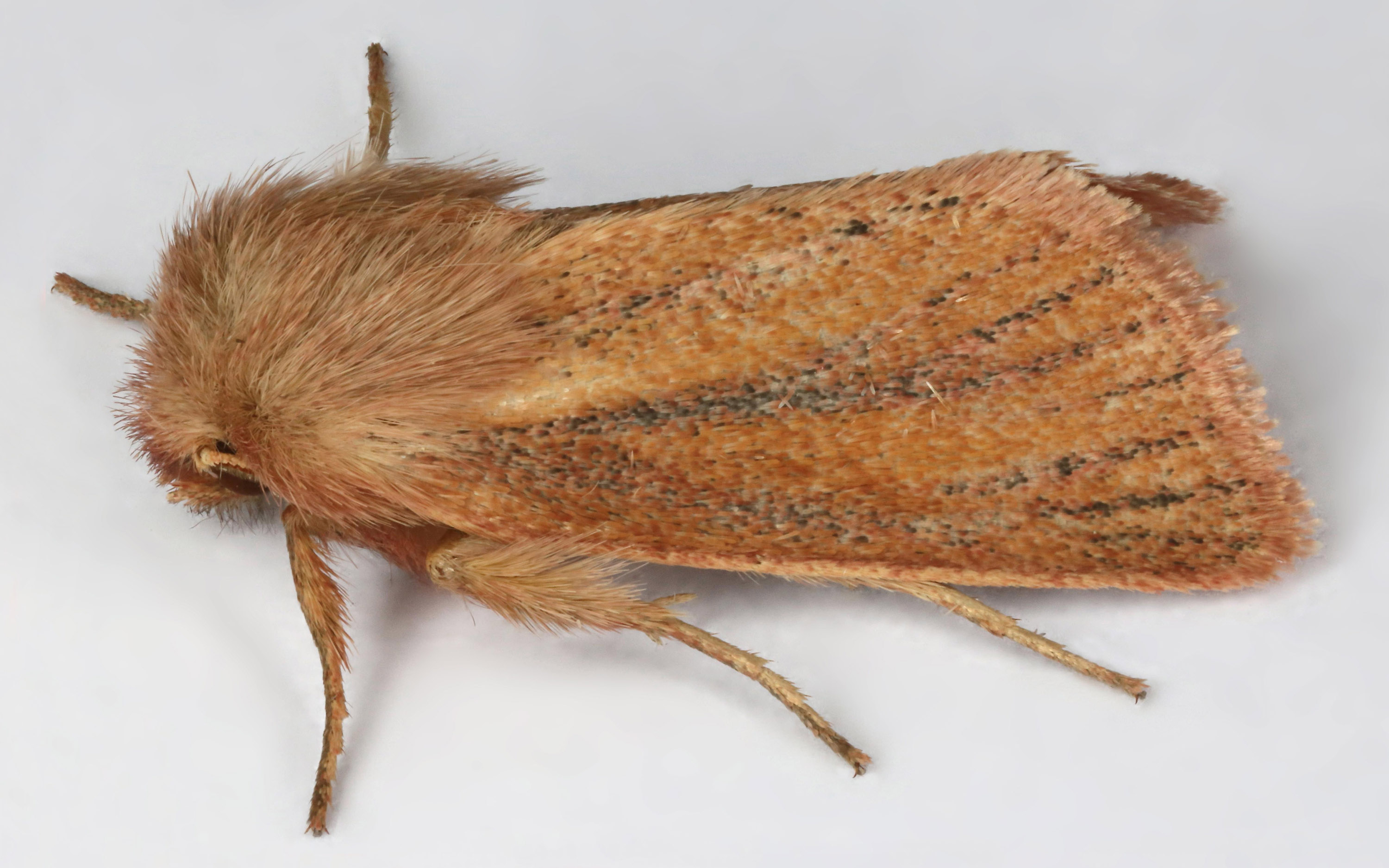

Scientific classification
- Domain: Eukaryota
- Kingdom: Animalia
- Phylum: Arthropoda
- Class: Insecta
- Order: Lepidoptera
- Superfamily: Noctuoidea
- Family: Noctuidae
- Subfamily: Xyleninae
- Genus: Denticucullus; Rakosy, 1996

= Denticucullus =

Genus of moths

Denticucullus is a genus of moths of the family Noctuidae.

== Species ==
- Denticucullus mabillei (D. Lucas, 1907)
- Denticucullus pygmina – Small Wainscot (Haworth, 1809)
