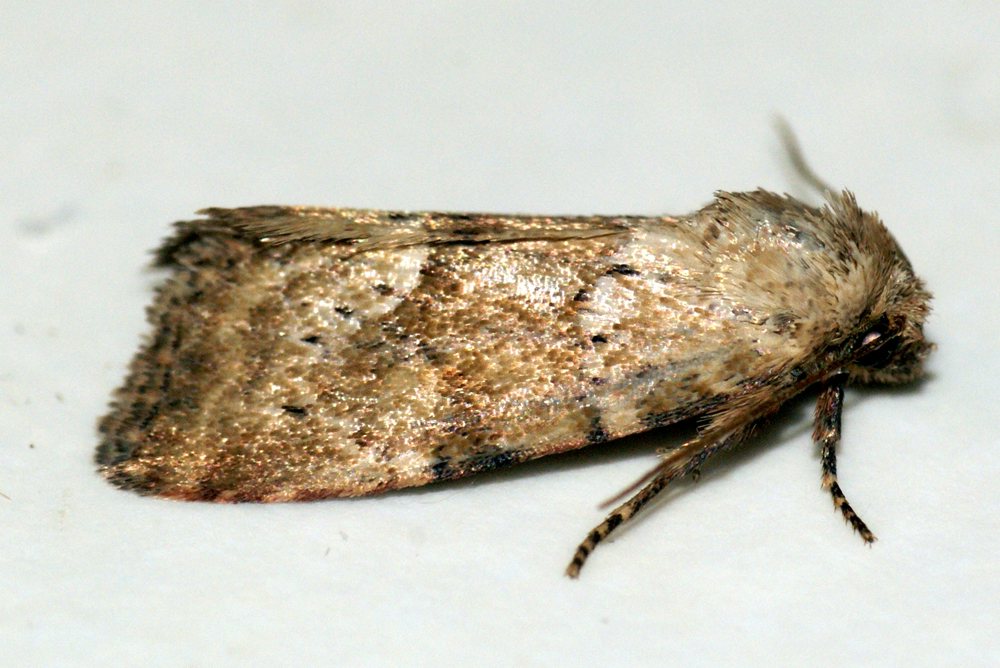

Scientific classification
- Domain: Eukaryota
- Kingdom: Animalia
- Phylum: Arthropoda
- Class: Insecta
- Order: Lepidoptera
- Superfamily: Noctuoidea
- Family: Noctuidae
- Genus: Photedes
- Species: P. minima

Binomial name
- Photedes minima (Haworth, 1809)

= Photedes minima =

Small dotted buff

Species of moth

Photedes minima, the small dotted buff, is a species of moth of the family Noctuidae. It is found in Europe.

== Technical description and variation ==
The wingspan is 20–23 mm. The length of the forewings is 11–14 mm. Forewing pale ochreous, slightly dusted with darker, and washed with pale ochraceous; the median area in female usually a little deeper coloured, especially in lower half; inner and outer lines fine, obscure, conversely lunulate-dentate, the teeth produced along the veins, sometimes paler-edged, generally marked only by vein-dashes; subterminal line faint, preceded by a diffuse dark shade, forming a patch at costa; hindwing ochreous, suffused with grey, thickly towards termen, with traces of a dark outer line; some specimens are more strongly suffused with ochraceous or rufous; these constitute the aberration lutescens Haw.

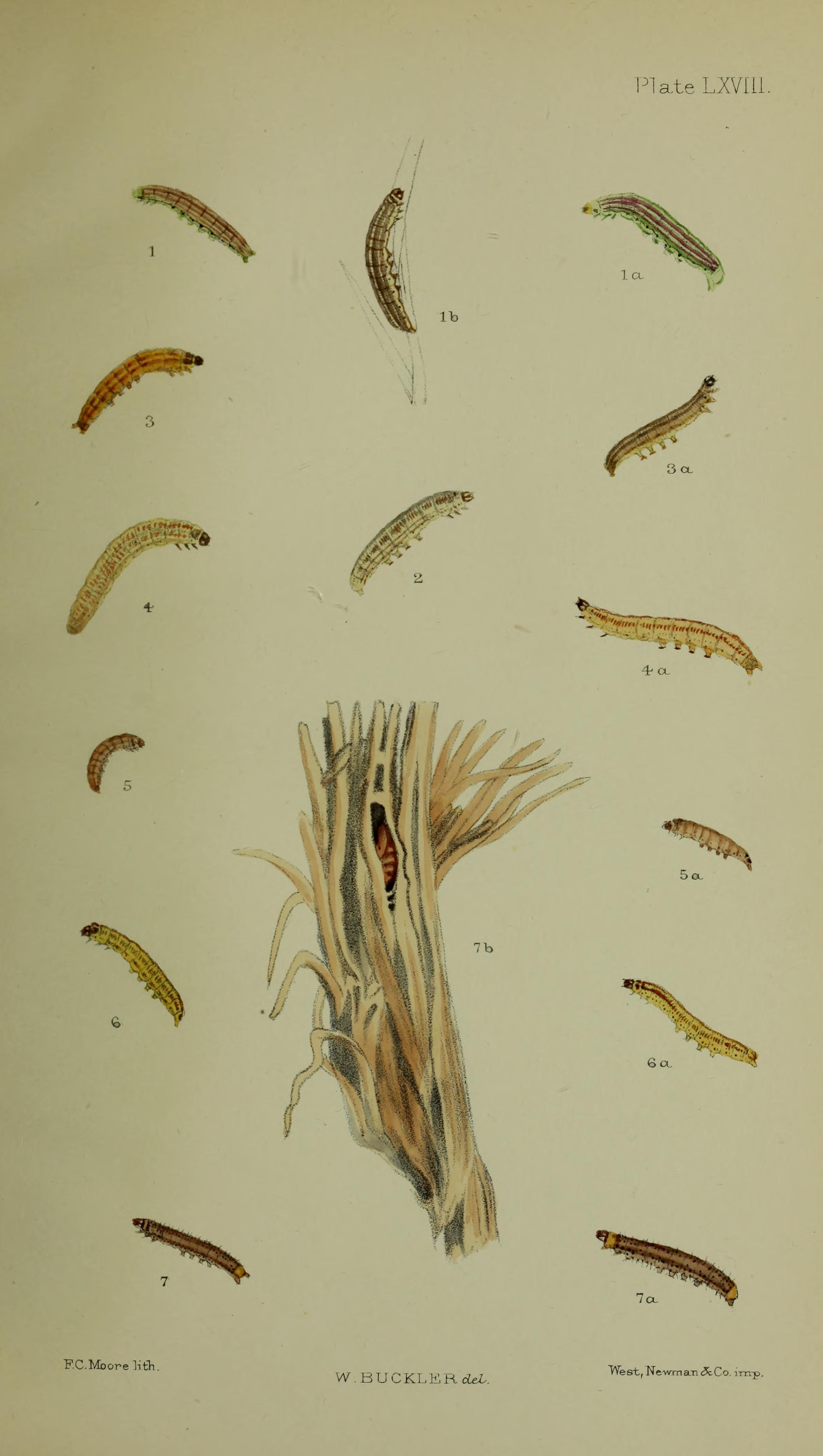
Fig.6, 6a larva after last moult

== Biology ==
The moth flies from June to August depending on the location.

Larva ochreous, sometimes pinkish, with darker transverse bars at the segments; dorsal and subdorsal lines paler; head brown; thoracic plate paler brown. The larvae feed on tufted hair-grass en Deschampsia flexuosa.
