= Deserticossus arenicola =

Scientific classification
- Kingdom: Animalia
- Phylum: Arthropoda
- Class: Insecta
- Order: Lepidoptera
- Family: Cossidae
- Genus: Deserticossus
- Species: D. arenicola

Binomial name
- Deserticossus arenicola (Staudinger, 1879)

Synonyms
- Cossus arenicola Staudinger, 1879; Holcocerus arenicola; Holcocerus arenicola transcaucasicus Zukowsky, 1936; Holcocerus arenicola albida Seitz, 1912; Holcocerus dilutior Rothschild, 1912

Species of moth

Deserticossus arenicola is a species of moth of the family Cossidae. It is found in Russia (Dagestan), Armenia, Azerbaijan, Georgia, Turkmenistan, Kazakhstan, Uzbekistan, Kyrgyzstan, north-western China, Iran, Afghanistan, Pakistan, Egypt (Sinai) and Jordan.

The wingspan is 38–63 mm. The forewings are light ash grey with black markings. The hindwings are uniform grey. Adults have been recorded on wing in May in the Sinai desert and in March in Jordan.

The larvae have been recorded feeding on Tigrovaya balka, Tamarix ramosissima and Tamarix hispida.

== Subspecies ==
- Deserticossus arenicola arenicola (Kazakhstan, Uzbekistan, Kirghizia, northern Afghanistan, China)
- Deserticossus arenicola iranica (Austaut, 1897) (Iran, Afghanistan, Pakistan)
- Deserticossus arenicola transcaucasicus (Zukowsky, 1936) (Dagestan, Armenia, Georgia, Azerbaijan)
