= Deserticossus janychar =

Scientific classification
- Kingdom: Animalia
- Phylum: Arthropoda
- Clade: Pancrustacea
- Class: Insecta
- Order: Lepidoptera
- Family: Cossidae
- Genus: Deserticossus
- Species: D. janychar

Binomial name
- Deserticossus janychar Yakovlev, 2006

Species of moth

Deserticossus janychar is a moth in the family Cossidae. It is found in Asia Minor.

The length of the forewings is 17–19 mm for males and about 20 mm for females.
