= Holcocerus didmanidzae =

Scientific classification
- Kingdom: Animalia
- Phylum: Arthropoda
- Clade: Pancrustacea
- Class: Insecta
- Order: Lepidoptera
- Family: Blastobasidae
- Genus: Holcocerus
- Species: H. didmanidzae

Binomial name
- Holcocerus didmanidzae Yakovlev, 2006

Species of moth

Holcocerus didmanidzae is a moth in the family Cossidae. It is found in Georgia.

The length of the forewings is about 12 mm. The forewings are light with a row of brown spots at the costal margin. The hindwings are patternless.
