= Cossulus bolshoji =

Scientific classification
- Domain: Eukaryota
- Kingdom: Animalia
- Phylum: Arthropoda
- Class: Insecta
- Order: Lepidoptera
- Family: Cossidae
- Genus: Cossulus
- Species: C. bolshoji

Binomial name
- Cossulus bolshoji (Zukowsky, 1936)

Synonyms
- Holcocerus bolshoji Zukowsky, 1936; Cossulinus herzi bolshoji

Species of moth

Cossulus bolshoji is a moth in the family Cossidae. It is found in Kazakhstan, Kyrgyzstan and Uzbekistan.
