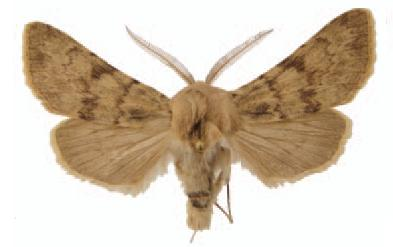
- Male
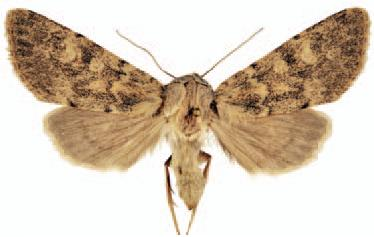
- Female

Scientific classification
- Domain: Eukaryota
- Kingdom: Animalia
- Phylum: Arthropoda
- Class: Insecta
- Order: Lepidoptera
- Superfamily: Noctuoidea
- Family: Noctuidae
- Genus: Pseudohadena
- Species: P. magnitudinis

Binomial name
- Pseudohadena magnitudinis Hacker & Ebert, 2002

Synonyms
- Pseudohadena (Jaxartia) magnitudinis

= Pseudohadena magnitudinis =

Species of moth

Pseudohadena magnitudinis is a moth of the family Noctuidae which is endemic to Iran.
