= Cossulus mollis =

Scientific classification
- Domain: Eukaryota
- Kingdom: Animalia
- Phylum: Arthropoda
- Class: Insecta
- Order: Lepidoptera
- Family: Cossidae
- Genus: Cossulus
- Species: C. mollis

Binomial name
- Cossulus mollis (Christoph, 1887)

Synonyms
- Holcocerus mollis Christoph, 1887

Species of moth

Cossulus mollis is a moth in the family Cossidae. It is found in Turkmenistan and Iraq.

The length of the forewings is 13–15 mm.

== Subspecies ==
- Cossulus mollis mollis (Turkmenistan)
- Cossulus mollis muelleri Yakovlev, 2006 (Iraq)
