= Cossulus griseatellus =

Scientific classification
- Kingdom: Animalia
- Phylum: Arthropoda
- Clade: Pancrustacea
- Class: Insecta
- Order: Lepidoptera
- Family: Cossidae
- Genus: Cossulus
- Species: C. griseatellus

Binomial name
- Cossulus griseatellus Yakovlev, 2006

Species of moth

Cossulus griseatellus is a moth in the family Cossidae. It is found in Pakistan and Afghanistan.

The length of the forewings is 12–13 mm.
