= Cossulus zoroastres =

Scientific classification
- Domain: Eukaryota
- Kingdom: Animalia
- Phylum: Arthropoda
- Class: Insecta
- Order: Lepidoptera
- Family: Cossidae
- Genus: Cossulus
- Species: C. zoroastres

Binomial name
- Cossulus zoroastres (Grum-Grshimailo, 1902)

Synonyms
- Hypopta zoroastres Grum-Grshimailo, 1902

Species of moth

Cossulus zoroastres is a moth in the family Cossidae. It is found in Iran.
