= Holcocerus nobilis =

Scientific classification
- Kingdom: Animalia
- Phylum: Arthropoda
- Clade: Pancrustacea
- Class: Insecta
- Order: Lepidoptera
- Family: Blastobasidae
- Genus: Holcocerus
- Species: H. nobilis

Binomial name
- Holcocerus nobilis Staudinger, 1884

Synonyms
- Holcocerus marmoratus Austaut, 1897; Holcocerus strigatus Austaut, 1897; Holcocerus difficilis A. Bang-Haas, 1906

Species of moth

Holcocerus nobilis is a moth in the family Cossidae. It was first described by Staudinger in 1884. It is found in Kazakhstan, Uzbekistan, Kirghizstan, Tajikistan, Turkmenistan, China, Iran and Afghanistan. The habitat consists of deserts and semi-deserts.

Adults are on wing in summer, probably in two generations per year.
