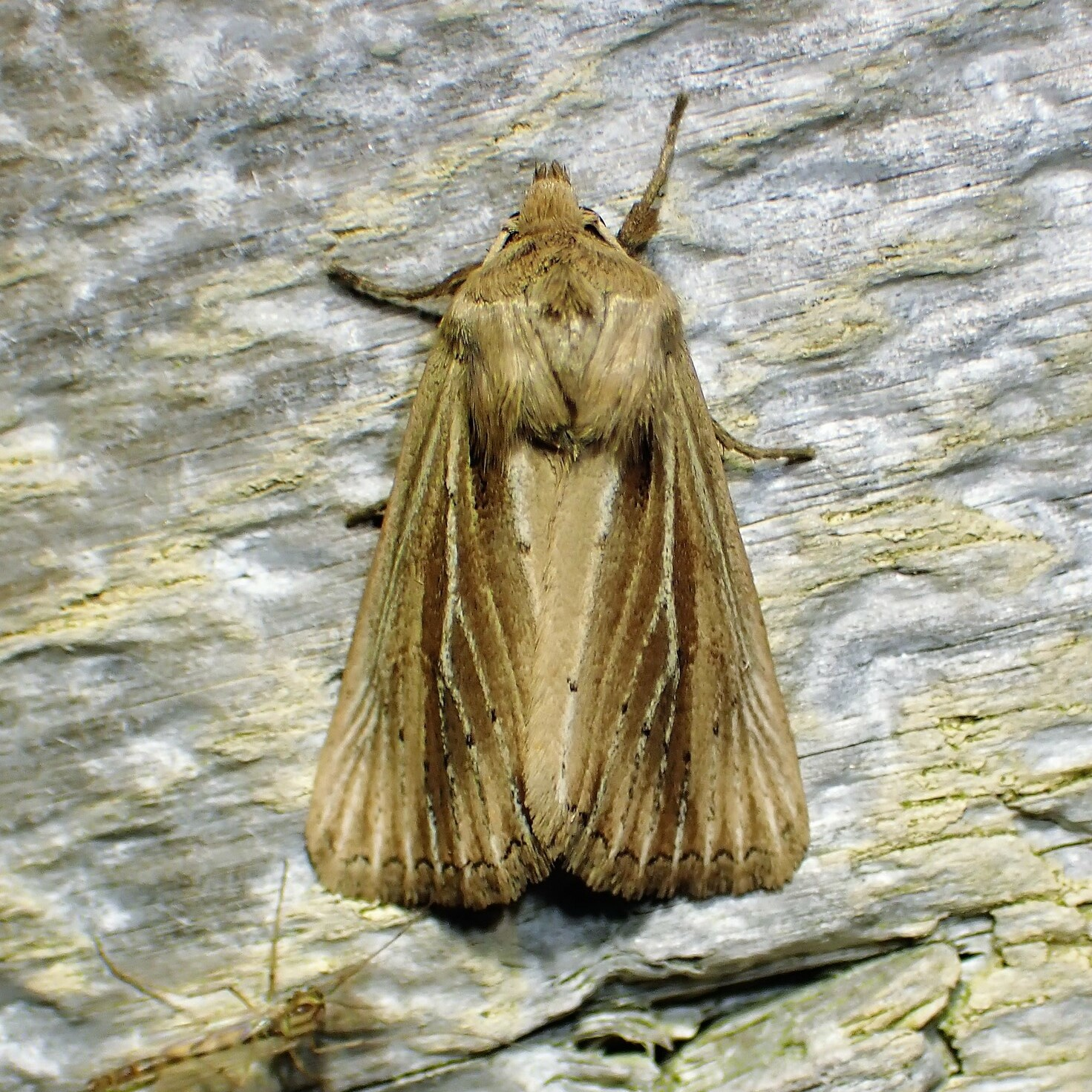

Scientific classification
- Domain: Eukaryota
- Kingdom: Animalia
- Phylum: Arthropoda
- Class: Insecta
- Order: Lepidoptera
- Superfamily: Noctuoidea
- Family: Noctuidae
- Genus: Hypocoena
- Species: H. rufostrigata

Binomial name
- Hypocoena rufostrigata (Packard, 1867)

Synonyms
- Leucania rufostrigata Packard, 1867; Caradrina punctivena Smith, 1894; Chortodes rufostrigata; Hypocoena (Chortodes) rufostrigata

= Hypocoena rufostrigata =

Species of moth

Hypocoena rufostrigata is a species of moth in the family Noctuidae that was first described by Alpheus Spring Packard in 1867. It is found along the Atlantic coast of North America north to the Northwest Territories and Alaska, and south in the west to California and Utah.

The wingspan is 26–30 mm. Adults are on wing from June to September. There is one generation per year, although there may be a partial second brood.
