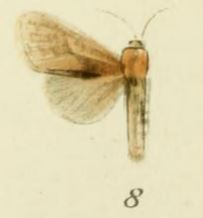
- Holcoceroides ferrugineotincta

Scientific classification
- Kingdom: Animalia
- Phylum: Arthropoda
- Clade: Pancrustacea
- Class: Insecta
- Order: Lepidoptera
- Family: Cossidae
- Genus: Holcoceroides; Strand, 1913
- Species: H. ferrugineotincta

Binomial name
- Holcoceroides ferrugineotincta Strand, 1913

Synonyms
- Holcocerus ferrugineotincta; Holcoceroides ferrugineotinctus; Holcocerus ferrugineotinctus

= Holcoceroides =

Holcoceroides ferrugineotincta

Monotypic moth genus in family Cossidae

Holcoceroides is a monotypic genus of carpenter moths (family Cossidae). It includes only the species Holcoceroides ferrugineotincta and is doubtfully distinct from Holcocerus. Like the latter, its relationships to other Cossidae are not determined with certainty. The species is found in Equatorial Guinea, Ivory Coast, Nigeria and Sudan.
