= Deserticossus pulverulentus =

Scientific classification
- Domain: Eukaryota
- Kingdom: Animalia
- Phylum: Arthropoda
- Class: Insecta
- Order: Lepidoptera
- Family: Cossidae
- Genus: Deserticossus
- Species: D. pulverulentus

Binomial name
- Deserticossus pulverulentus (Püngeler, 1898)

Synonyms
- Holcocerus pulverulentus Püngeler, 1898; Holcocerus phuckangensis Hua, Chou, Fang et Chen, 1990

Species of moth

Deserticossus pulverulentus is a species of moth of the family Cossidae. It is found in Kazakhstan, Kyrgyzstan, Uzbekistan, Turkmenistan, north-western China (Xinjiang) and Israel.

The length of the forewings is 18–28 mm for males and 22–33 mm for females. The forewings are light with a suffusion of grey scales. The hindwings are white, with small black strokes at the veins. Adults have been recorded on wing in June in Israel.
