= Holcocerus holosericeus =

Scientific classification
- Domain: Eukaryota
- Kingdom: Animalia
- Phylum: Arthropoda
- Class: Insecta
- Order: Lepidoptera
- Family: Blastobasidae
- Genus: Holcocerus
- Species: H. holosericeus

Binomial name
- Holcocerus holosericeus Staudinger, 1884

Synonyms
- Holcocerus faroulti Oberthür, 1911; Holcocerus desioi Turati, 1936; Holcocerus persicus Austaut, 1897

Species of moth

Holcocerus holosericeus is a species of moth of the family Cossidae. It is found in Kazakhstan, Mongolia, Kyrgyzstan, Uzbekistan, Tajikistan, Turkmenistan, north-western China, Afghanistan, Iran, Israel, Jordan, the United Arab Emirates, Egypt, Algeria, Tunisia, Libya and Morocco. The habitat consists of deserts.

The length of the forewings is 13–19 mm for males and 17–23 mm for females. The wings are pure white. Adults have been recorded on wing from April to May and in December in Israel.

== Subspecies ==
- Holcocerus holosericeus holosericeus
- Holcocerus holosericeus darwesthana Daniel, 1959 (south-western Afghanistan, southern Iran)
- Holcocerus holosericeus faroulti Oberthür, 1911 (Israel, Jordan, the United Arab Emirates, Egypt, Tunisia, Libya, Morocco)
