= Hypocoena inquinata =

Scientific classification
- Domain: Eukaryota
- Kingdom: Animalia
- Phylum: Arthropoda
- Class: Insecta
- Order: Lepidoptera
- Superfamily: Noctuoidea
- Family: Noctuidae
- Genus: Hypocoena
- Species: H. inquinata

Binomial name
- Hypocoena inquinata (Guenée, 1852)

Synonyms
- Nonagria inquinata Guenée, 1852; Tapiostola orientalis Grote, 1882; Chortodes inquinata; Hypocoena (Chortodes) inquinata; Hypocoena variana (Morrison, 1876); Tapinostola variana Morrison, 1876; Chortodes variana; Hypocoena (Chortodes) variana

Species of moth

Hypocoena inquinata, the sordid wainscot or tufted sedge moth, is a moth of the family Noctuidae. The species was first described by Achille Guenée in 1852. It is found across Canada from Newfoundland to British Columbia, south in the east to Connecticut and Ohio and in the west to Colorado.

The wingspan is 20–28 mm. Adults are on wing from July to August. There is one generation per year.

The larvae feed on sedges.
