= Cossulus herzi =

Scientific classification
- Domain: Eukaryota
- Kingdom: Animalia
- Phylum: Arthropoda
- Class: Insecta
- Order: Lepidoptera
- Family: Cossidae
- Genus: Cossulus
- Species: C. herzi

Binomial name
- Cossulus herzi (Alphéraky, 1893)

Synonyms
- Hypopta herzi Alphéraky, 1893

Species of moth

Cossulus herzi is a moth in the family Cossidae. It is found in Iran, Afghanistan, Uzbekistan and Kyrgyzstan.
