= Parahypopta nigrosignata =

Scientific classification
- Domain: Eukaryota
- Kingdom: Animalia
- Phylum: Arthropoda
- Class: Insecta
- Order: Lepidoptera
- Family: Cossidae
- Genus: Parahypopta
- Species: P. nigrosignata

Binomial name
- Parahypopta nigrosignata (Rothschild, 1912)

Synonyms
- Cossus nigrosignatus Rothschild, 1912

Species of moth

Parahypopta nigrosignata is a moth in the family Cossidae. It is found in Syria, Turkey, Jordan and Israel.
