= Vartiania muscula =

Scientific classification
- Domain: Eukaryota
- Kingdom: Animalia
- Phylum: Arthropoda
- Class: Insecta
- Order: Lepidoptera
- Family: Cossidae
- Genus: Vartiania
- Species: V. muscula

Binomial name
- Vartiania muscula (Rothschild, 1912)

Synonyms
- Holcocerus musculus Rothschild, 1912; Vartiania musculus

Species of moth

Vartiania muscula is a moth in the family Cossidae. It is found in Kazakhstan.
