= Cossulus mucosus =

Scientific classification
- Domain: Eukaryota
- Kingdom: Animalia
- Phylum: Arthropoda
- Class: Insecta
- Order: Lepidoptera
- Family: Cossidae
- Genus: Cossulus
- Species: C. mucosus

Binomial name
- Cossulus mucosus (Christoph, 1884)

Synonyms
- Hypopta mucosus Christoph, 1884

Species of moth

Cossulus mucosus is a moth in the family Cossidae. It is found in south-eastern Kazakhstan, southern Kyrgyzstan, Tajikistan, Turkmenistan, Iran and Afghanistan.
