= Cossulus argentatus =

Scientific classification
- Domain: Eukaryota
- Kingdom: Animalia
- Phylum: Arthropoda
- Class: Insecta
- Order: Lepidoptera
- Family: Cossidae
- Genus: Cossulus
- Species: C. argentatus

Binomial name
- Cossulus argentatus Staudinger, 1887

Synonyms
- Cossululus lignosus araxes de Freina, 1983

Species of moth

Cossulus argentatus is a moth in the family Cossidae. It is found in Turkey, Armenia and Iran.
