= Cossulus nedretus =

Scientific classification
- Kingdom: Animalia
- Phylum: Arthropoda
- Clade: Pancrustacea
- Class: Insecta
- Order: Lepidoptera
- Family: Cossidae
- Genus: Cossulus
- Species: C. nedretus

Binomial name
- Cossulus nedretus de Freina & Yakovlev, 2005

Species of moth

Cossulus nedretus is a moth in the family Cossidae. It is found in eastern Turkey.
