= Deserticossus =

Scientific classification
- Kingdom: Animalia
- Phylum: Arthropoda
- Clade: Pancrustacea
- Class: Insecta
- Order: Lepidoptera
- Family: Cossidae
- Subfamily: Cossinae
- Genus: Deserticossus; Yakovlev, 2006

Genus of moths

Deserticossus is a genus of moths in the family Cossidae.

== Species ==
- Deserticossus arenicola (Staudinger, 1879)
- Deserticossus artemisiae (Chou et Hua, 1986)
- Deserticossus beketi (Yakovlev, 2004)
- Deserticossus campicola (Eversmann, 1854)
- Deserticossus churkini Yakovlev, 2006
- Deserticossus consobrinus (Pungeler, 1898)
- Deserticossus curdus Yakovlev, 2006
- Deserticossus danilevskyi Yakovlev, 2006
- Deserticossus decoratus Yakovlev, 2006
- Deserticossus janychar Yakovlev, 2006
- Deserticossus lukhtanovi Yakovlev, 2006
- Deserticossus mongoliana (Daniel, 1969)
- Deserticossus murinus (Rothschild, 1912)
- Deserticossus praeclarus (Pungeler, 1898)
- Deserticossus pullus (Chua, Chou, Fang & Chen, 1990)
- Deserticossus pulverulentus (Püngeler, 1898)
- Deserticossus sareptensis (Rothschild, 1912)
- Deserticossus tsingtauana (Bang-Haas, 1912)
- Deserticossus volgensis (Christoph, 1893)
