= Deserticossus danilevskyi =

Scientific classification
- Kingdom: Animalia
- Phylum: Arthropoda
- Clade: Pancrustacea
- Class: Insecta
- Order: Lepidoptera
- Family: Cossidae
- Genus: Deserticossus
- Species: D. danilevskyi

Binomial name
- Deserticossus danilevskyi Yakovlev, 2006

Species of moth

Deserticossus danilevskyi is a moth in the family Cossidae. It is found in Kazakhstan.

The length of the forewings is 17–22 mm.
