= Barchaniella sacara =

Scientific classification
- Domain: Eukaryota
- Kingdom: Animalia
- Phylum: Arthropoda
- Class: Insecta
- Order: Lepidoptera
- Family: Cossidae
- Genus: Barchaniella
- Species: B. sacara

Binomial name
- Barchaniella sacara (Grum-Grshimailo, 1902)

Synonyms
- Holcocerus sacarum Grum-Grshimailo, 1902; Holcocerus sacara; Barchaniella sacarum; Hypopta sumbannus Rothschild, 1912; Hypopta tekkensis Rothschild, 1912; Holcocerus brunneogrisea Daniel, 1949

Species of moth

Barchaniella sacara is a moth in the family Cossidae. It is found in southern Kazakhstan, Uzbekistan and Turkmenistan.

The length of the forewings is 12–15 mm. Adults are on wing in May.
