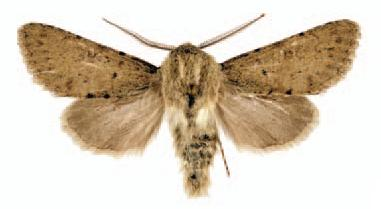
- Male
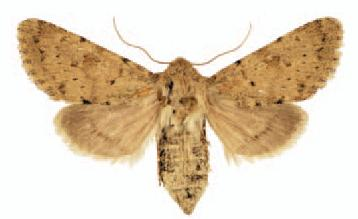
- Female

Scientific classification
- Domain: Eukaryota
- Kingdom: Animalia
- Phylum: Arthropoda
- Class: Insecta
- Order: Lepidoptera
- Superfamily: Noctuoidea
- Family: Noctuidae
- Genus: Pseudohadena
- Species: P. anatine

Binomial name
- Pseudohadena anatine Pekarsky, 2012

Synonyms
- Pseudohadena (Jaxartia) gorbunovi

= Pseudohadena gorbunovi =

Species of moth

Pseudohadena gorbunovi is a moth of the family Noctuidae. It is found on the Ustyurt plateau in south-western Kazakhstan.

The wingspan is 31–40 mm (1.2–1.6 in) for males and about 36 mm (1.4 in) for females. The forewing wing pattern is indistinct. The subbasal and medial lines are recognisable only on most strongly patterned specimens. The hindwings are pale, shining beige grey. The transverse line is present and the discal spot hardly discernible.

== Etymology ==
The new species is dedicated to the famous Russian entomologist, Mr. Pavel Gorbunov, who collected the species.
