= Deserticossus sareptensis =

Scientific classification
- Domain: Eukaryota
- Kingdom: Animalia
- Phylum: Arthropoda
- Class: Insecta
- Order: Lepidoptera
- Family: Cossidae
- Genus: Deserticossus
- Species: D. sareptensis

Binomial name
- Deserticossus sareptensis (Rothschild, 1912)

Synonyms
- Cossus sareptensis Rothschild, 1912; Holcocerus sareptensis

Species of moth

Deserticossus sareptensis is a species of moth of the family Cossidae. It is found in the south-eastern part of European Russia.

The wingspan is about 31 mm. The forewings are light brown with a lighter area in the middle part and narrow wavy lines. The hindwings are uniform grey.
