= Parahypopta radoti =

Scientific classification
- Domain: Eukaryota
- Kingdom: Animalia
- Phylum: Arthropoda
- Class: Insecta
- Order: Lepidoptera
- Family: Cossidae
- Genus: Parahypopta
- Species: P. radoti

Binomial name
- Parahypopta radoti (Homberg, 1911)

Synonyms
- Hypopta radoti Homberg, 1911; Hypopta caestrum radoti

Species of moth

Parahypopta radoti is a species of moth of the family Cossidae. It is found in France.

The wingspan is 32–38 mm.
