= Vartiania =

Scientific classification
- Kingdom: Animalia
- Phylum: Arthropoda
- Clade: Pancrustacea
- Class: Insecta
- Order: Lepidoptera
- Family: Cossidae
- Subfamily: Cossinae
- Genus: Vartiania; Yakovlev, 2004

Genus of moths

Vartiania is a genus of moths in the family Cossidae.

== Species ==
- Vartiania drangianicus (Grum-Grshimailo, 1902)
- Vartiania muscula (Rothschild, 1912)
- Vartiania sapho Yakovlev, 2007
- Vartiania senganensis (Daniel, 1949)
- Vartiania zaratustra Yakovlev, 2004
