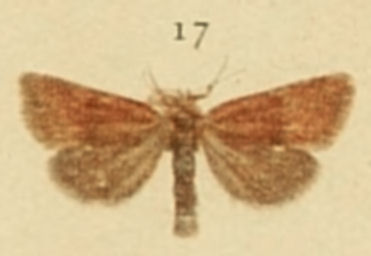

Scientific classification
- Kingdom: Animalia
- Phylum: Arthropoda
- Class: Insecta
- Order: Lepidoptera
- Superfamily: Noctuoidea
- Family: Noctuidae
- Genus: Photedes
- Species: P. captiuncula

Binomial name
- Photedes captiuncula (Treitschke, 1825)

Synonyms
- Apamea captiuncula Treitschke, 1825; Apamea unica Freyer, 1858; Miana expolita Doubleday, 1855; Photedes captiunctula kasyi Varga, 1970; Photedes captiuncula delattini Varga, 1970; Photedes captiuncula var. tincta Kane, 1895

= Photedes captiuncula =

Species of moth

Photedes captiuncula, the least minor, is a moth of the family Noctuidae. It is found throughout Europe, in Turkey, Armenia, Russia and much of temperate Asia (western Siberia, Altai Mountains, Central Asia and Amur).

== Technical description and variation ==
The wingspan is 15–18 mm. Forewing whitish ochreous, the base and costal area fulvous, olive-tinged; the median and terminal areas either simply deeper fulvous or darkened with blackish scales; the lines white, thicker in female than male, sometimes diffusely expanded on inner margin; orbicular and reniform sometimes orange-tawny, or grey brown and obscure, generally with pale rings; hindwing dark fuscous; in expolita Dbld.the usual North British form, the forewing is uniform greyish brown; this is also recorded from Armenia; — in tincta Kane, from Ireland, (which Staudinger wrongly sinks to captiuncula), the basal area is grey, the median deep pink, and the terminal pale glossy pink.

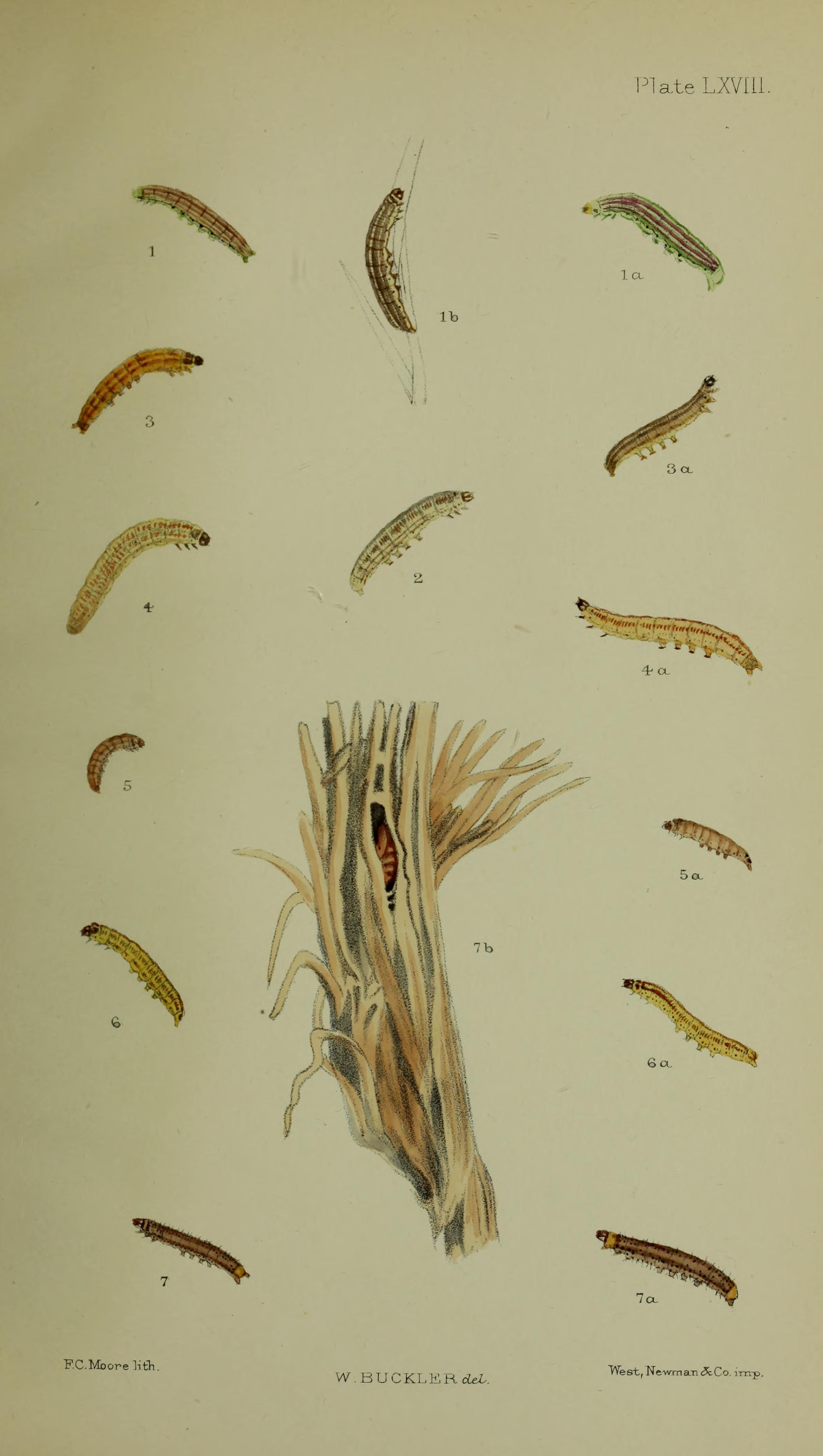
Fig.5, 5a larva after last moult

== Biology ==
The moth flies in June and July.

Larva (of expolita) ochreous tinged with reddish, more purplish on the dorsum of middle segments; head reddish brown; thoracic plate paler. The larvae feed internally (in the stem and roots) on glaucous sedge, Carex glauca and other sedges.
