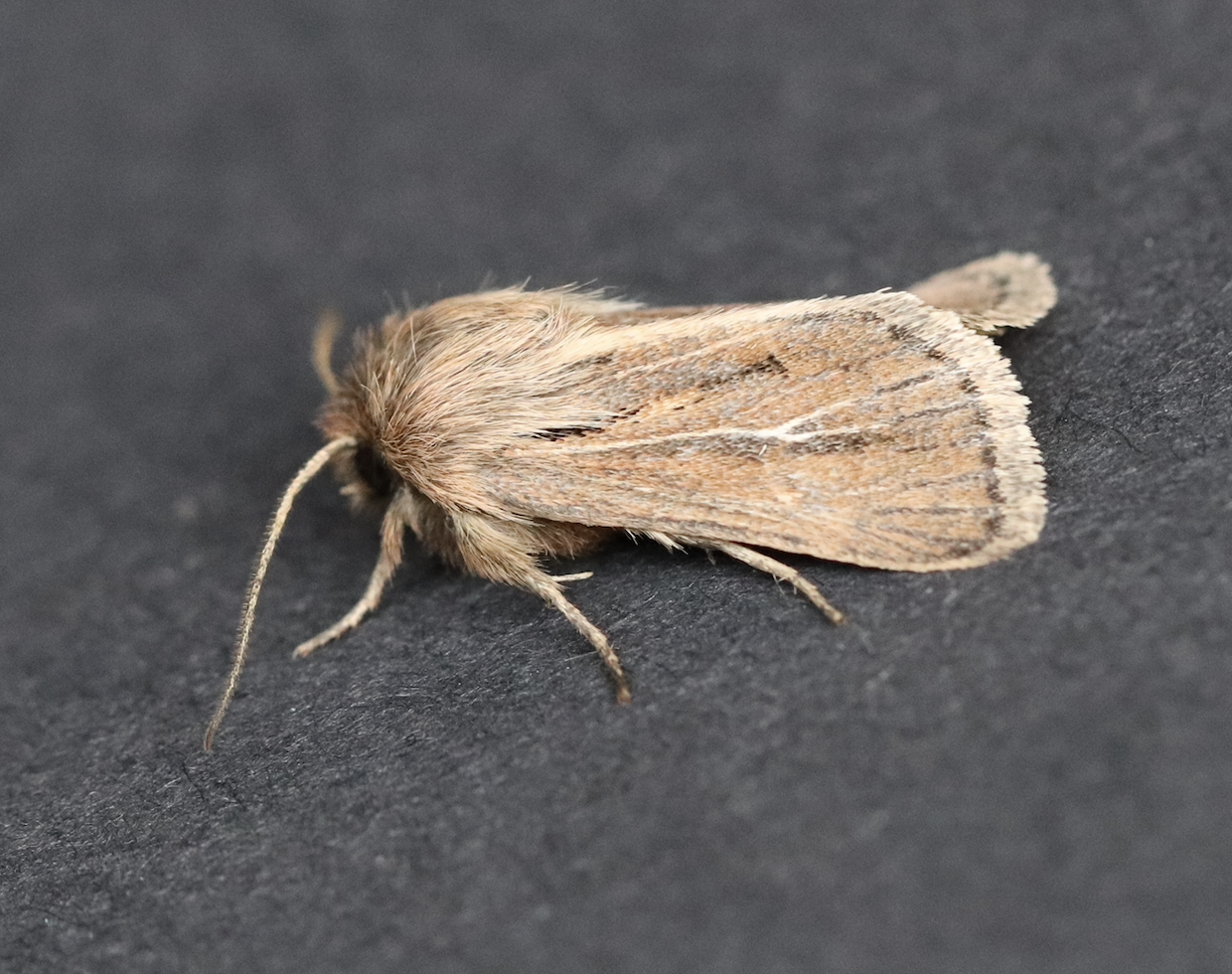

Scientific classification
- Domain: Eukaryota
- Kingdom: Animalia
- Phylum: Arthropoda
- Class: Insecta
- Order: Lepidoptera
- Superfamily: Noctuoidea
- Family: Noctuidae
- Genus: Hypocoena
- Species: H. basistriga

Binomial name
- Hypocoena basistriga (McDunnough, 1933)

Synonyms
- Calamia basistriga McDunnough, 1933; Chortodes basistriga; Hypocoena (Chortodes) basistriga

= Hypocoena basistriga =

Species of moth

Hypocoena basistriga is a species of moth in the family Noctuidae that was first described by James Halliday McDunnough in 1933. It is found from Newfoundland and Labrador west to British Columbia and Yukon. This species of moth is found to frequent mesic areas including the edges of aspen bluffs and hayfields, old fields, meadows, etc.

== Identification ==
This is a small (about 2.5–2.7 cm wingspan) dark red-brown or yellowish-brown moth. There is a black basal streak, short in some specimens but extending halfway across the wing in the fold in others. The most prominent markings are the contrasting white cubital and median veins, and to a lesser degree the anal and radial veins as well. For the most part this white scaling stops well short of the wing margin. The trailing edge of the forewing is usually pale yellow or buff. The hindwings are dark sooty brown or black. Sexes similar. The combination of small size, robust build, red-brown color and contrasting white cubital vein will usually identify this moth.

== History ==
The adults are nocturnal and come to light. There is a single brood, which flies in mid-late summer. The larval host(s) is apparently unknown. Related species are borers in plant stems.

== Global distribution ==
Hypocoena basistriga is found in the western boreal zone, from Alaska to Alberta and the western Great Lakes region. It does not occur further east. Several records are shown for the Sierra Nevada in California.

== Life cycle ==
=== Larvae ===
No information is presently available regarding the larval biology of this species. It bores in monocots like sedges (Cyperaceae); perennial plants that resemble grasses, grow in shallow water or moist soils, and can reach 4 feet in height.

=== Adult ===
This species has been collected in late summer and early fall across its range, most commonly during August and September. The limited number of records from British Columbia are from September and early October. It is nocturnal and comes to lights. Adults' wingspan is 25–27 mm. Adults are on wing from mid to late summer. There is one generation per year.
