= Deserticossus consobrinus =

Scientific classification
- Domain: Eukaryota
- Kingdom: Animalia
- Phylum: Arthropoda
- Class: Insecta
- Order: Lepidoptera
- Family: Cossidae
- Genus: Deserticossus
- Species: D. consobrinus

Binomial name
- Deserticossus consobrinus (Püngeler, 1898)

Synonyms
- Holcocerus consobrinus Püngeler, 1898; Cossus aksuensis Daniel, 1953; Holcocerus sheljuzhkoi Schawerda, 1930; Holcocerus apicalis Chou et Hua, 1986

Species of moth

Deserticossus consobrinus is a moth in the family Cossidae. It was described by Püngeler in 1898. It is found in China (Xinjiang)., southern Siberia, Mongolia, Kazakhstan and Kirghizistan.

The length of the forewings is 17–23 mm for males and 21–26 mm for females. Adults are on wing from June to August.
