= Hypocoena stigmatica =

Scientific classification
- Domain: Eukaryota
- Kingdom: Animalia
- Phylum: Arthropoda
- Class: Insecta
- Order: Lepidoptera
- Superfamily: Noctuoidea
- Family: Noctuidae
- Genus: Hypocoena
- Species: H. stigmatica

Binomial name
- Hypocoena stigmatica (Eversmann, 1855)

Synonyms
- Leucania stigmatica Eversmann, 1855; Tapinostola lagunica Graeser, 1889; Chortodes stigmatica; Photedes stigmatica; Hypocoena (Chortodes) stigmatica; Chortodes dispersa

Species of moth

Hypocoena stigmatica is a species of moth of the family Noctuidae. It is found on the Faroe Islands and Iceland, as well as parts of Russia and Alaska.

The length of the fore wings is about 13 mm.

The larvae probably feed on Ammophila and Leymus species.

== Subspecies ==
- Hypocoena stigmatica stigmatica (Southern Urals to Transbaikalia to Amur, Magadan, Alaska)
- Hypocoena stigmatica dispersa (Faroe Islands, Iceland)
