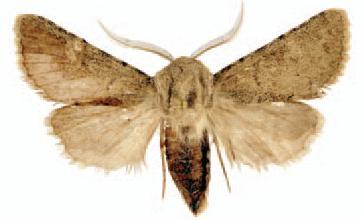
- Pseudohadena anatine male
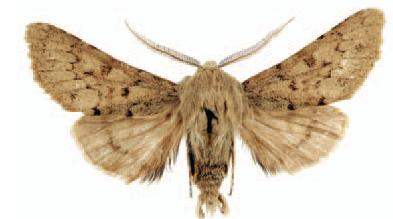
- Pseudohadena evanida male

Scientific classification
- Domain: Eukaryota
- Kingdom: Animalia
- Phylum: Arthropoda
- Class: Insecta
- Order: Lepidoptera
- Superfamily: Noctuoidea
- Family: Noctuidae
- Subtribe: Antitypina
- Genus: Pseudohadena; Alphéraky, 1889

Synonyms
- Jaxartia Püngeler, 1914; Pseudopseustis Hampson, 1910

= Pseudohadena =

Genus of moths

Pseudohadena is a genus of moths of the family Noctuidae.

== Species ==
- Pseudohadena albilacustris Ronkay, Varga & Gyulai, 2002
- Pseudohadena anatine Pekarsky, 2012
- Pseudohadena arenacea (Ronkay, Varga & Fábián, 1995)
- Pseudohadena argyllostigma Varga & Ronkay, 1991
- Pseudohadena armata (Alphéraky, 1887)
- Pseudohadena cymatodes (Boursin, 1954)
- Pseudohadena deserticola Ronkay, Varga & Fábián, 1995
- Pseudohadena elinguis (Püngeler, 1914)
- Pseudohadena evanida Püngeler, 1914
- Pseudohadena gorbunovi Pekarsky, 2012
- Pseudohadena igorkostyuki Ronkay, Varga & Fábián, 1995
- Pseudohadena jordana (Staudinger, 1900)
- Pseudohadena leucochlora Ronkay, Varga & Gyulai, 2002
- Pseudohadena magnitudinis Hacker & Ebert, 2002
- Pseudohadena obsoleta Ronkay, Varga & Fábián, 1995
- Pseudohadena phasmidia Ronkay, Varga & Fábián, 1995
- Pseudohadena pseudamoena Boursin, 1943
- Pseudohadena striolata (Filipjev, 1949)
- Pseudohadena tellieri (Lucas, 1907)
- Pseudohadena vulnerea (Grote, 1883)
