= Deserticossus campicola =

Scientific classification
- Domain: Eukaryota
- Kingdom: Animalia
- Phylum: Arthropoda
- Class: Insecta
- Order: Lepidoptera
- Family: Cossidae
- Genus: Deserticossus
- Species: D. campicola

Binomial name
- Deserticossus campicola (Eversmann, 1854)

Synonyms
- Cossus campicola Eversmann, 1854; Holcocerus campicola

Species of moth

Deserticossus campicola is a species of moth of the family Cossidae. It is found in Russia, Kazakhstan, Kyrgyzstan, Azerbaijan, Uzbekistan and western China.

The length of the forewings is 19–20 mm for males and 22–28 mm for females. The forewings are grey, sprinkled with black. The hindwings are uniform grey.

The larvae develop in Haloxylon wood, where they hibernate twice.
