= Deserticossus murinus =

Scientific classification
- Domain: Eukaryota
- Kingdom: Animalia
- Phylum: Arthropoda
- Class: Insecta
- Order: Lepidoptera
- Family: Cossidae
- Genus: Deserticossus
- Species: D. murinus

Binomial name
- Deserticossus murinus (Rothschild, 1912)

Synonyms
- Holcocerus murinus Rothschild, 1912

Species of moth

Deserticossus murinus is a moth in the family Cossidae. It is found in Kazakhstan and Kirghizistan. The habitat consists of semi-deserts and mountains at altitudes between 450 and 1,800 meters.

The length of the forewings is 16–25 mm for males and 18–25 mm for females. Adults are on wing from June to August.
