= Deserticossus tsingtauana =

Scientific classification
- Domain: Eukaryota
- Kingdom: Animalia
- Phylum: Arthropoda
- Class: Insecta
- Order: Lepidoptera
- Family: Cossidae
- Genus: Deserticossus
- Species: D. tsingtauana

Binomial name
- Deserticossus tsingtauana (Bang-Haas, 1912)

Synonyms
- Holcocerus tsingtauana Bang-Haas, 1912; Cossus centrimaculatus Rober, 1925

Species of moth

Deserticossus tsingtauana is a moth in the family Cossidae. It is found in Russia (Primorye), Mongolia, China, Korea and northern Vietnam. The habitat consists of forests.

The length of the forewings is 24–31 mm for males and 32–34 mm for females. Adults are on wing from May to August.
