= Cossulus =

Scientific classification
- Domain: Eukaryota
- Kingdom: Animalia
- Phylum: Arthropoda
- Class: Insecta
- Order: Lepidoptera
- Family: Cossidae
- Subfamily: Cossinae
- Genus: Cossulus; Staudinger, 1887

Synonyms
- Cossulinus Kirby, 1892

Genus of moths

Cossulus is a genus of moths in the family Cossidae.

== Species ==
- Cossulus alaicus Yakovlev, 2006
- Cossulus alatauicus Yakovlev, 2006
- Cossulus argentatus Staudinger, 1887
- Cossulus bolshoji (Zukowsky, 1936)
- Cossulus darvazi Sheljuzhko, 1943
- Cossulus griseatellus Yakovlev, 2006
- Cossulus herzi (Alphéraky, 1893)
- Cossulus intractatus (Staudinger, 1887)
- Cossulus irani (Daniel, 1937)
- Cossulus issycus (Gaede, 1933)
- Cossulus kabulense Daniel, 1965
- Cossulus lena Yakovlev, 2008
- Cossulus lignosus (Brandt, 1938)
- Cossulus mollis (Christoph, 1887)
- Cossulus mucosus (Christoph, 1884)
- Cossulus nasreddin Yakovlev, 2006
- Cossulus nedretus de Freina & Yakovlev, 2005
- Cossulus nikiforoviorum Yakovlev, 2006
- Cossulus nycteris (John, 1923)
- Cossulus putridus (Christoph, 1887)
- Cossulus sergechurkini Yakovlev, 2008
- Cossulus sheljuzhkoi (Zukowsky, 1936)
- Cossulus stertzi (Püngeler, 1899)
- Cossulus strioliger Alphéraky, 1893
- Cossulus turcomanica Christoph, 1893
- Cossulus zoroastres (Grum-Grshimailo, 1902)
