= Holcocerus rjabovi =

Scientific classification
- Kingdom: Animalia
- Phylum: Arthropoda
- Clade: Pancrustacea
- Class: Insecta
- Order: Lepidoptera
- Family: Blastobasidae
- Genus: Holcocerus
- Species: H. rjabovi

Binomial name
- Holcocerus rjabovi Yakovlev, 2006

Species of moth

Holcocerus rjabovi is a moth in the family Cossidae. It is found in Armenia and Azerbaijan.

The length of the forewings is 17–20 mm.
