= Cossulus lena =

Scientific classification
- Kingdom: Animalia
- Phylum: Arthropoda
- Clade: Pancrustacea
- Class: Insecta
- Order: Lepidoptera
- Family: Cossidae
- Genus: Cossulus
- Species: C. lena

Binomial name
- Cossulus lena Yakovlev, 2008

Species of moth

Cossulus lena is a moth in the family Cossidae. It is found in Turkey.
