= Vartiania sapho =

Scientific classification
- Kingdom: Animalia
- Phylum: Arthropoda
- Clade: Pancrustacea
- Class: Insecta
- Order: Lepidoptera
- Family: Cossidae
- Genus: Vartiania
- Species: V. sapho

Binomial name
- Vartiania sapho Yakovlev, 2007

Species of moth

Vartiania sapho is a moth in the family Cossidae. It is found in Pakistan.
