= Vartiania senganensis =

Scientific classification
- Domain: Eukaryota
- Kingdom: Animalia
- Phylum: Arthropoda
- Class: Insecta
- Order: Lepidoptera
- Family: Cossidae
- Genus: Vartiania
- Species: V. senganensis

Binomial name
- Vartiania senganensis (Daniel, 1949)

Synonyms
- Holcocerus senganensis Daniel, 1949

Species of moth

Vartiania senganensis is a moth in the family Cossidae. It is found in Iran and Afghanistan.
