= Barchaniella mus =

Scientific classification
- Domain: Eukaryota
- Kingdom: Animalia
- Phylum: Arthropoda
- Class: Insecta
- Order: Lepidoptera
- Family: Cossidae
- Genus: Barchaniella
- Species: B. mus

Binomial name
- Barchaniella mus (Grum-Grshimailo, 1902)

Synonyms
- Holcocerus mus Grum-Grshimailo, 1902

Species of moth

Barchaniella mus is a moth in the family Cossidae. It is found in south-eastern Iran.

The length of the forewings is 14–16 mm. Adults are on wing in April.
