= Cossulus strioliger =

Scientific classification
- Domain: Eukaryota
- Kingdom: Animalia
- Phylum: Arthropoda
- Class: Insecta
- Order: Lepidoptera
- Family: Cossidae
- Genus: Cossulus
- Species: C. strioliger

Binomial name
- Cossulus strioliger (Alphéraky, 1893)

Synonyms
- Holcocerus strioliger Alpheraky, 1893; Paropta confusa Rothschild, 1912

Species of moth

Cossulus strioliger is a moth in the family Cossidae. It is found in Iran, Afghanistan, Tajikistan, Uzbekistan and Kyrgyzstan.
