= Photedes defecta =

Scientific classification
- Kingdom: Animalia
- Phylum: Arthropoda
- Class: Insecta
- Order: Lepidoptera
- Superfamily: Noctuoidea
- Family: Noctuidae
- Genus: Photedes
- Species: P. defecta

Binomial name
- Photedes defecta (Grote, 1874)

Synonyms
- Senta defecta Grote, 1874; Chortodes defecta; Hypocoena (Chortodes) defecta; Hypocoena defecta (Grote, 1874)

Species of moth

Photedes defecta, the narrow-winged borer, is a moth of the family Noctuidae. The species was first described by Augustus Radcliffe Grote in 1874. It is found in North America from Maryland and Massachusetts north to New Brunswick, west to North Dakota and British Columbia.

The wingspan is 25–27 mm. Adults are on wing from July to September. There is one generation per year, but there might be a smaller second brood in mid to late September.
