= Photedes inops =

Scientific classification
- Kingdom: Animalia
- Phylum: Arthropoda
- Class: Insecta
- Order: Lepidoptera
- Superfamily: Noctuoidea
- Family: Noctuidae
- Genus: Photedes
- Species: P. inops

Binomial name
- Photedes inops (Grote, 1881)

Species of moth

Photedes inops, the spartina borer moth, is a species of moth native to North America. The larvae are hosted on Spartina pectinata, apparently exclusively. It is listed as a species of special concern in the US state of Connecticut.
