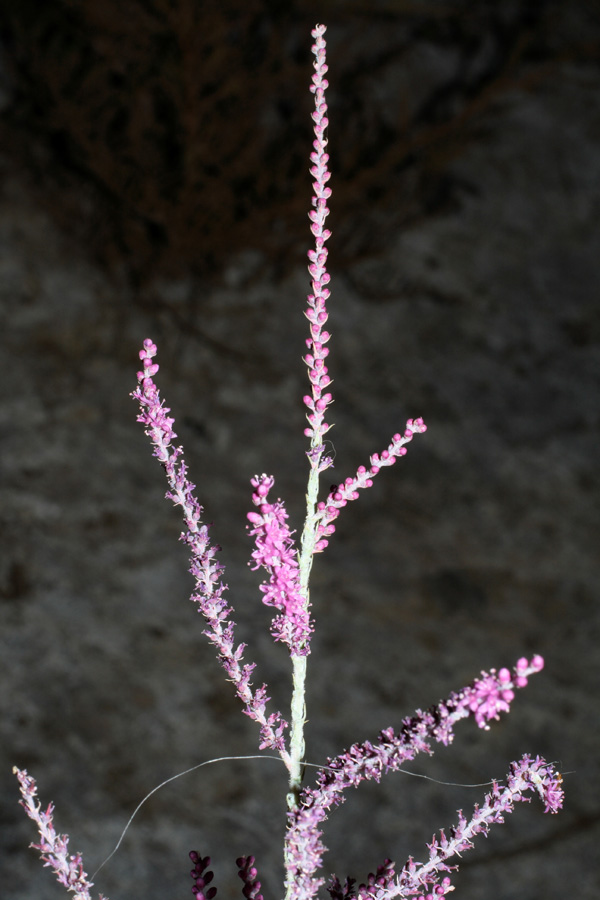

Scientific classification
- Kingdom: Plantae
- Clade: Tracheophytes
- Clade: Angiosperms
- Clade: Eudicots
- Order: Caryophyllales
- Family: Tamaricaceae
- Genus: Tamarix
- Species: T. hispida

Binomial name
- Tamarix hispida Willd.

= Tamarix hispida =

Species of flowering plant

Tamarix hispida, commonly known as Kashgar tamarisk, is a species of tamarisk in the Tamaricaceae family. It is found in Central Asia. The foliage has a bluish-green color and the plant flowers in autumn.
