= Deserticossus mongoliana =

Scientific classification
- Domain: Eukaryota
- Kingdom: Animalia
- Phylum: Arthropoda
- Class: Insecta
- Order: Lepidoptera
- Family: Cossidae
- Genus: Deserticossus
- Species: D. mongoliana

Binomial name
- Deserticossus mongoliana Daniel, 1969

Synonyms
- Holcocerus mongoliana Daniel, 1969

Species of moth

Deserticossus mongoliana is a moth in the family Cossidae. It was described by Franz Daniel in 1969. It is found in Mongolia. The habitat consists of deserts, where it is found at altitudes ranging from 900 to 1,600 meters.

The length of the forewings is 12–18 mm for males and 17–22 mm for females. Adults are on wing from June to July.
