= Photedes enervata =

Scientific classification
- Kingdom: Animalia
- Phylum: Arthropoda
- Class: Insecta
- Order: Lepidoptera
- Superfamily: Noctuoidea
- Family: Noctuidae
- Genus: Photedes
- Species: P. enervata

Binomial name
- Photedes enervata (Guenée, 1852)

Synonyms
- Nonagria enervata Guenée, 1852; Nonagria fodiens Guenée, 1852; Chortodes enervata; Hypocoena (Chortodes) enervata; Hypocoena orphnina (Dyar, 1912); Arenosola orphnina Dyar, 1912; Chortodes orphnina; Hypocoena (Chortodes) orphnina; Hypocoena enervata (Guenée, 1852)

Species of moth

Photedes enervata, the many-lined cordgrass moth, previously known as Hypocoena enervata, is a species of moth of the family Noctuidae. It is found in marshes along the Atlantic Coast of North America, with scattered inland wetlands records from Nova Scotia and New Brunswick south to Florida.

The larvae feed on Spartina alterniflora.
