= Photedes panatela =

Scientific classification
- Domain: Eukaryota
- Kingdom: Animalia
- Phylum: Arthropoda
- Class: Insecta
- Order: Lepidoptera
- Superfamily: Noctuoidea
- Family: Noctuidae
- Tribe: Apameini
- Genus: Photedes
- Species: P. panatela

Binomial name
- Photedes panatela (Smith, 1904)

Species of moth

Photedes panatela, the northern cordgrass borer, is a species of cutworm or dart moth in the family Noctuidae.

The MONA or Hodges number for Photedes panatela is 9436.
