= Photedes =

Scientific classification
- Domain: Eukaryota
- Kingdom: Animalia
- Phylum: Arthropoda
- Class: Insecta
- Order: Lepidoptera
- Superfamily: Noctuoidea
- Family: Noctuidae
- Tribe: Apameini
- Genus: Photedes; Lederer, 1857

Synonyms
- Spartiniphaga

Genus of moths

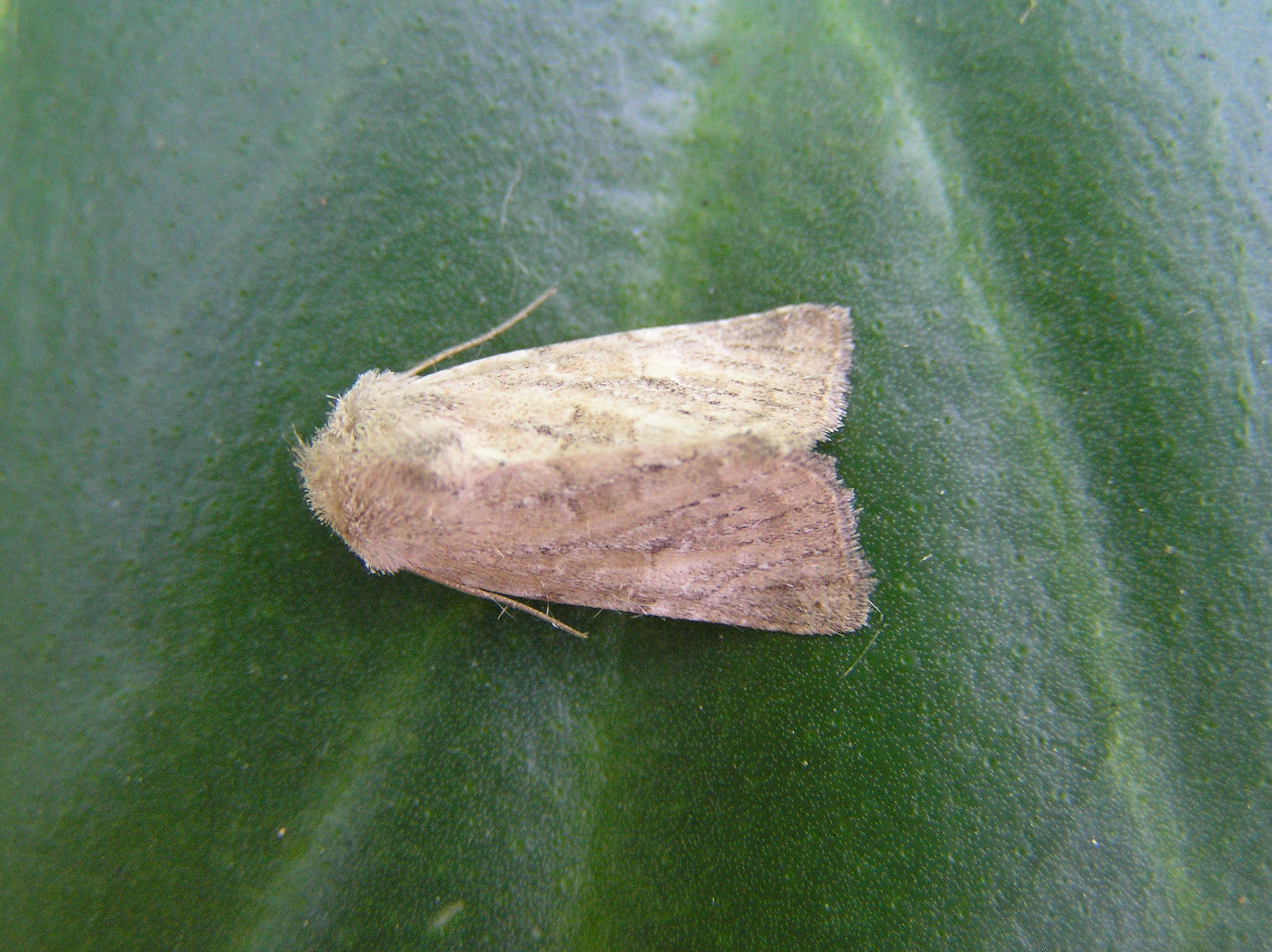
Photedes minima. Picture taken in Goes, the Netherlands.

Photedes is a genus of moths of the family Noctuidae.

== Species ==
- Photedes albivena (Christoph, 1887)
- Photedes amseli (Boursin, 1961)
- Photedes captiuncula (Treitschke, 1825)
- Photedes carterae Schweitzer, 1983
- Photedes defecta (Grote, 1874)
- Photedes delattini (Wiltshire, 1953)
- Photedes deserticola (Staudinger, 1899)
- Photedes didonea (Smith, 1894)
- Photedes enervata (Guenée, 1852)
- Photedes extrema (Hübner, 1809)
- Photedes homora (Bethune-Baker, 1911)
- Photedes improba (Staudinger, 1899)
- Photedes includens (Walker, 1858)
- Photedes inops (Grote, 1881)
- Photedes minima (Haworth, 1809)
- Photedes panatela (Smith, 1904)
- Photedes urbahni (Boursin, 1956)
