= Cossulus sheljuzhkoi =

Scientific classification
- Domain: Eukaryota
- Kingdom: Animalia
- Phylum: Arthropoda
- Class: Insecta
- Order: Lepidoptera
- Family: Cossidae
- Genus: Cossulus
- Species: C. sheljuzhkoi

Binomial name
- Cossulus sheljuzhkoi (Zukowsky, 1936)

Synonyms
- Hypopta sheljuzhkoi Zukowsky, 1936; Parahypopta sheljuzhkoi

Species of moth

Cossulus sheljuzhkoi is a species of moth of the family Cossidae. It is found in Kazakhstan, Kyrgyzstan, Uzbekistan, Tajikistan and Israel.

Adults have been recorded on wing in June in Israel.
