= Deserticossus volgensis =

Scientific classification
- Kingdom: Animalia
- Phylum: Arthropoda
- Clade: Pancrustacea
- Class: Insecta
- Order: Lepidoptera
- Family: Cossidae
- Genus: Deserticossus
- Species: D. volgensis

Binomial name
- Deserticossus volgensis (Christoph, 1893)

Synonyms
- Holcocerus volgensis Christoph, 1893

Species of moth

Deserticossus volgensis is a species of moth in the family Cossidae. It is found in Russia (southern Volga region), the northern Caucasus (Stavropol, Dagestan), north-western Kazakhstan and Turkey.

Its wingspan is about 21 mm.
