= Cossulus putridus =

Scientific classification
- Domain: Eukaryota
- Kingdom: Animalia
- Phylum: Arthropoda
- Class: Insecta
- Order: Lepidoptera
- Family: Cossidae
- Genus: Cossulus
- Species: C. putridus

Binomial name
- Cossulus putridus (Christoph, 1887)

Synonyms
- Holcocerus putridus Christoph, 1887; Cossus putridus

Species of moth

Cossulus putridus is a moth in the family Cossidae. It is found in Turkmenistan, Afghanistan and Iran.
