= Photedes includens =

Scientific classification
- Kingdom: Animalia
- Phylum: Arthropoda
- Class: Insecta
- Order: Lepidoptera
- Superfamily: Noctuoidea
- Family: Noctuidae
- Genus: Photedes
- Species: P. includens

Binomial name
- Photedes includens (Walker, 1858)

Species of moth

Photedes includens, the included cordgrass borer, is a species of cutworm or dart moth in the family Noctuidae. It is found in North America.

The MONA or Hodges number for Photedes includens is 9434.
