= Cossulus intractatus =

Scientific classification
- Domain: Eukaryota
- Kingdom: Animalia
- Phylum: Arthropoda
- Class: Insecta
- Order: Lepidoptera
- Family: Cossidae
- Genus: Cossulus
- Species: C. intractatus

Binomial name
- Cossulus intractatus (Staudinger, 1887)

Synonyms
- Cossus intractatus Staudinger, 1887; Cossulinus intractatus; Cossulus intractata; Holcocerus sericeus Grum-Grshimailo, 1890

Species of moth

Cossulus intractatus is a moth in the family Cossidae. It is found in Afghanistan, Uzbekistan, Tajikistan, Kirghizistan, and Turkmenistan.
