= Barchaniella inspersus =

Scientific classification
- Domain: Eukaryota
- Kingdom: Animalia
- Phylum: Arthropoda
- Class: Insecta
- Order: Lepidoptera
- Family: Cossidae
- Genus: Barchaniella
- Species: B. inspersus

Binomial name
- Barchaniella inspersus (Christoph, 1887)

Synonyms
- Holcocerus inspersus Christoph, 1887

Species of moth

Barchaniella inspersus is a moth in the family Cossidae. It was described by Hugo Theodor Christoph in 1887. It is found in Kyrgyzstan, Afghanistan, Kazakhstan, Uzbekistan, Turkmenistan, north-western China and south-western Mongolia.

The length of the forewings is 12–16 mm for males and 13–17 mm for females. Adults are on wing from April to August.

The larvae live inside the trunks of Haloxylon species, in which they overwinter twice.
