= Vartiania drangianica =

Scientific classification
- Domain: Eukaryota
- Kingdom: Animalia
- Phylum: Arthropoda
- Class: Insecta
- Order: Lepidoptera
- Family: Cossidae
- Genus: Vartiania
- Species: V. drangianica

Binomial name
- Vartiania drangianica (Grum-Grshimailo, 1902)

Synonyms
- Holcocerus drangianicus Grum-Grshimailo, 1902

Species of moth

Vartiania drangianica is a moth in the family Cossidae. It is found in Iran.

The wingspan is about 37 mm.
