= Cossulus issycus =

Scientific classification
- Domain: Eukaryota
- Kingdom: Animalia
- Phylum: Arthropoda
- Class: Insecta
- Order: Lepidoptera
- Family: Cossidae
- Genus: Cossulus
- Species: C. issycus

Binomial name
- Cossulus issycus (Gaede, 1933)

Synonyms
- Hypopta issycus Gaede, 1933

Species of moth

Cossulus issycus is a moth in the family Cossidae. It is found in Uzbekistan.
