= Deserticossus beketi =

Scientific classification
- Kingdom: Animalia
- Phylum: Arthropoda
- Clade: Pancrustacea
- Class: Insecta
- Order: Lepidoptera
- Family: Cossidae
- Genus: Deserticossus
- Species: D. beketi

Binomial name
- Deserticossus beketi (Yakovlev, 2004)

Synonyms
- Holcocerus beketi Yakovlev, 2004

Species of moth

Deserticossus beketi is a moth in the family Cossidae. It was described by Yakovlev in 2004. It is found in Mongolia. The habitat consists of deserts.

The length of the forewings is about 22 mm. The forewings are dark grey with black stripes in postdiscal area between the veins. The hindwings are uniform grey. Adults are on wing from June to July.
