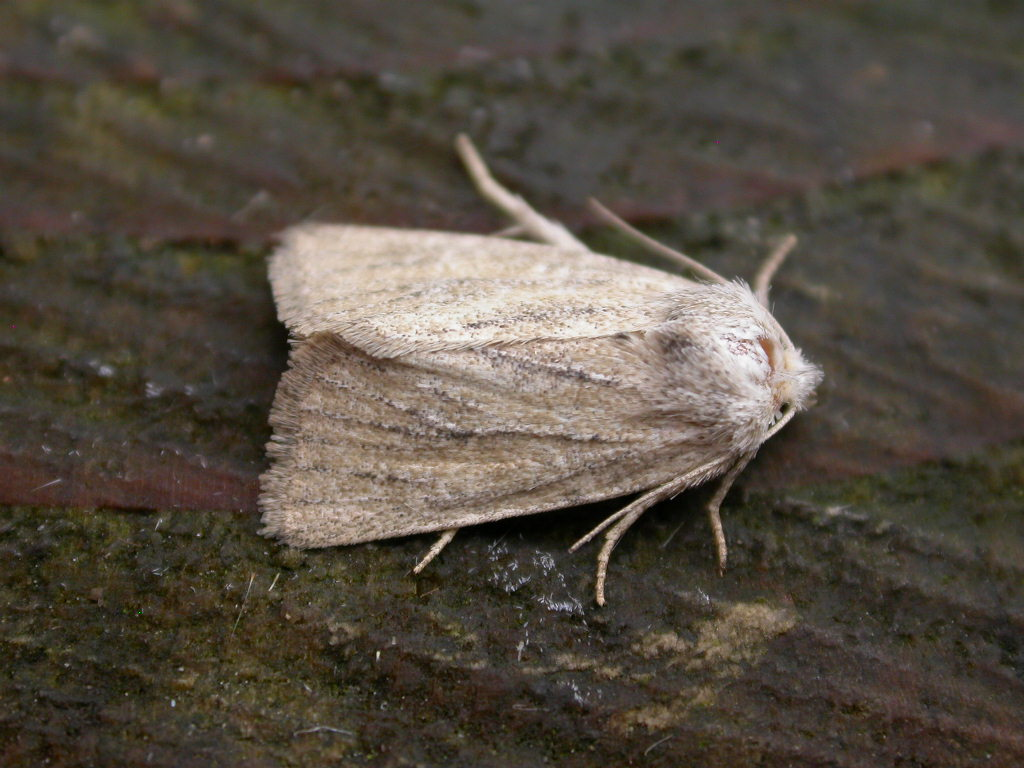

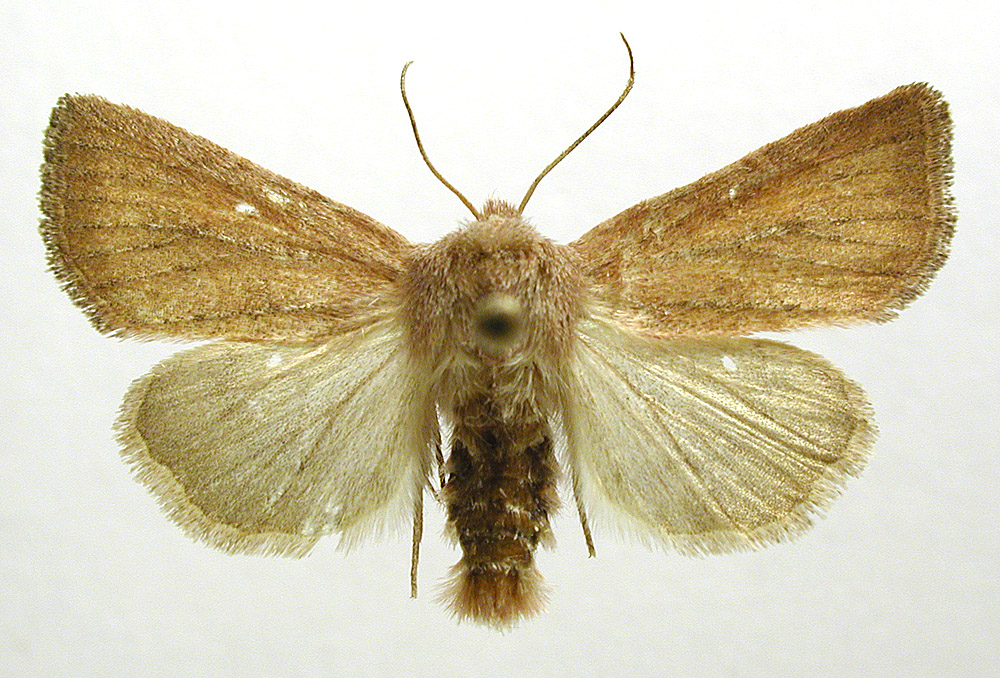

Scientific classification
- Kingdom: Animalia
- Phylum: Arthropoda
- Clade: Pancrustacea
- Class: Insecta
- Order: Lepidoptera
- Superfamily: Noctuoidea
- Family: Noctuidae
- Genus: Chortodes
- Species: C. fluxa

Binomial name
- Chortodes fluxa (Hübner, 1809)

Synonyms
- Noctua fluxa Hübner, 1809; Photedes fluxa (Hübner, 1809); Chortodes fluxus (Hübner, 1809)

= Chortodes fluxa =

Species of moth

Chortodes fluxa, the mere wainscot, is a moth of the family Noctuidae. The species was first described by Jacob Hübner in 1809. It is found in Europe and east across the Palearctic to Siberia, Mongolia, and northern China. Also in northern Turkey and the Caucasus.

A. fluxa Hbn. (= junci Bsd., helmanni Guen. nec Ev., extrema H. Schaff. nec Hbn., saturata Stgr., expressata Krul.) (49 f). Forewing rufous, dusted with grey whitish; the rufous tint clearer along the two folds; the costa and veins dotted grey and ochreous; orbicular and reniform of the ground colour with pale outlines, the orbicular round or elliptical, the lower lobe of reniform dark; outer line indicated by a curved row of dark pale-tipped spots on veins; hindwing pale greyish luteous; the form hellmanni Ev., by which name the insect has hitherto been known, is sandy ochreous, dusted with darker, with very little or no red tinge; ab. pulverosa ab. nov. (49 f), has the grey dusting very strong, the dots of outer line obsolete, and the veins dark. Larva bone colour, dorsally tinged with red, whiter below; the spiracles black; head glossy, yellowish brown; thoracic and anal plates paler. The wingspan is 26 to 30 millimetres (1.0 to 1.2 in). The moth flies from July to August depending on the location.

The larvae feed low down in the stems of Calamagrostis epigejos in marshy districts; pupating in a slight cocoon in the ground.
