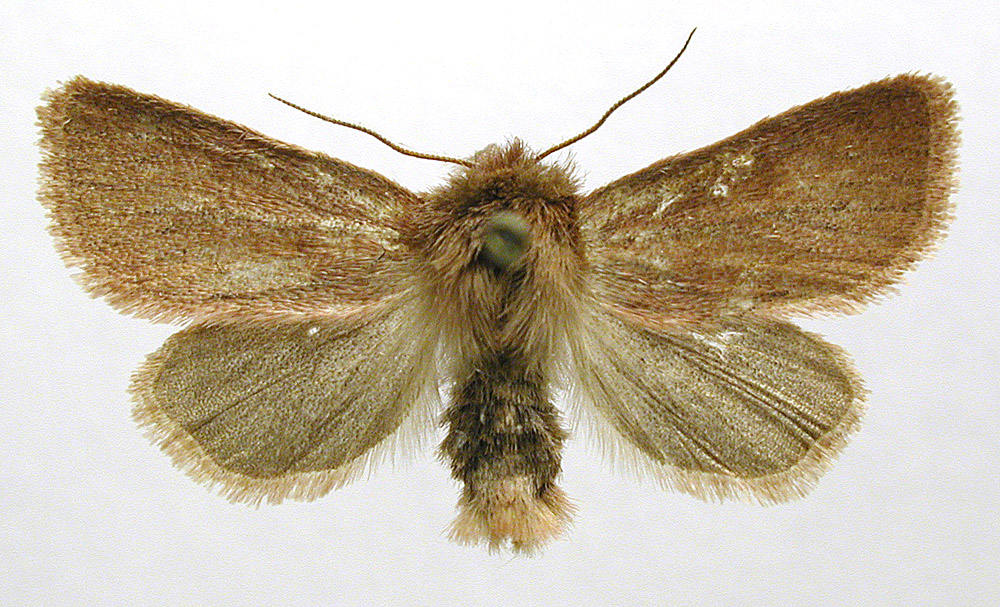

Scientific classification
- Domain: Eukaryota
- Kingdom: Animalia
- Phylum: Arthropoda
- Class: Insecta
- Order: Lepidoptera
- Superfamily: Noctuoidea
- Family: Noctuidae
- Genus: Denticucullus
- Species: D. pygmina

Binomial name
- Denticucullus pygmina (Haworth, 1809)

Synonyms
- Chortodes pygminus; Sedina pygmina; Photedes pygmina (Haworth, 1809); Noctua pygmina Haworth, 1809; Leucania pallida Stephens, 1829; Denticucullus pygmina; Tapiostola fulva var. transversa Staudinger, 1901; Noctua fulva Hübner, [1813]; Chortodes pygmina f. neurica Stephens, 1829; Chortodes pygmina f. concolor Tutt, 1891; Chortodes pygmina f. ochracea-suffusa Tutt, 1891; Chortodes pygmina f. punicea Tutt, 1891; Chortodes pygmina f. punicea-suffusa Tutt, 1891; Chortodes pygmina

= Denticucullus pygmina =

Small wainscot

Species of moth

Denticucullus pygmina, the small wainscot, is a moth of the family Noctuidae. It is found in most of Europe, ranging from northern Spain, through Portugal as far north as Finland. In the east it is found across the Palearctic to the Russian Far East and western Siberia. It is also found in North Africa, Turkey, the Caucasus region and northern Iran.

== Description ==
The wingspan is 23–29 mm. Forewing rosy red, or bright brick red without markings; hindwing pale grey: abdomen whitish with rosy anal segment; the male of this form is dull pink, with the costa and all the veins broadly dark grey and sometimes a trace of the dark outer line of dots; hindwing darker grey; in neither sex is there any tint of yellow or fulvous; the form fulva Hbn. is fulvous rufous with the veins and outer line of spots dark, especially the median vein; - ab. ochracea Tutt is yellow ochreous. without red tints, the outer line of dots marked, and often the median vein and the other veins towards termen; ab. punicea Tutt appears to be a paler and greyer, less fulvous, form of fulva; while pallida Stph.is pale ochreous or bone colour with the costa and veins dark grey and generally a dark shade running below the median vein; this form occurs of two sizes; the larger form may possibly represent the ab. neurica Stph.; ab. transversa Stgr. is distinguished by having the inner and outer lines complete and fully marked across the forewing, which is dark grey.

== Biology ==
Adults are on wing from mid-July to October.

The larvae feed on Carex (including Carex pseudocyperus), Juncus and Iris species. They feed internally in the stems of their host plant.
