= Rudolf Püngeler =

German entomologist (1857–1927)

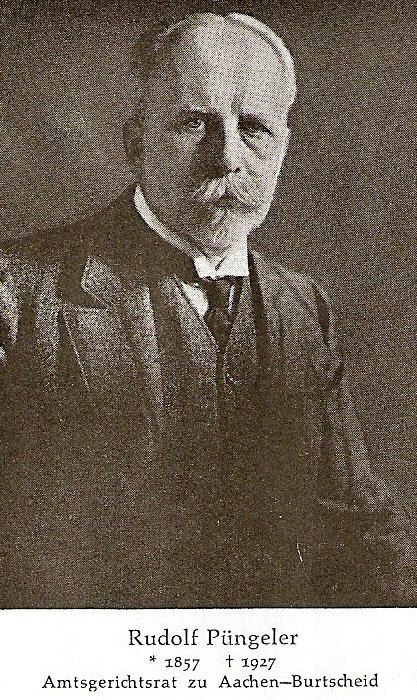
Rudolf Püngeler.

Rudolf Püngeler (15 February 1857 – 1 February 1927) was a German entomologist who specialised in Lepidoptera. He was a district court lawyer in Aachen.

Püngeler described very many new species and named ten new genera of moths mainly in Deutsche Entomologische Zeitschrift, Iris. Dresden. His most important work was on the Lepidoptera of Central Asia and China. His collection of Palaearctic Lepidoptera is in the Berlin Museum für Naturkunde.

He was born in Burtscheid and died in Aachen.

== Works ==
- "Diagnosen neuer Lepidopteren aus Centralasien". In: Societas Entomologica. Bd. 13, Nr. 8, 1898, ZDB-ID 204549-7, S. 57–58, online.
- "Neue Macrolepidopteren aus Centralasien". In: Deutsche entomologische Zeitschrift. Lepidopterologische Hefte Bd. 14, 1901, ZDB-ID 214570-4, S. 177–191, Taf. 1–3.
- "Neue Macrolepidopteren aus Centralasien". In: Societas Entomologica Bd. 19, Nr. 16, 1904, S. 121–122, Nr. 17, 130–131, online.
- Püngeler, R. 1904. Neue palaearctische Macrolepidopteren. - Deutsche entomologische Zeitschrift Iris 16: 286-301.
- "Neue paläarktische Macrolepidopteren". In: Deutsche entomologische Zeitschrift „Iris“ Bd. 19, 1906, ZDB-ID 214571-6, S. 78–98.
- "Neue paläarktische Macrolepidopteren". In: Deutsche entomologische Zeitschrift „Iris“ Bd. 28, 1914, S. 37–62.
- "6. Arctia wagneri Püng. nov. spec". In: Fritz Wagner: Einige alte und neue europäisch-palaearktische Lepidopteren In: Zeitschrift des Österreichischen Entomologischen Vereines Wien Bd. 3, S. 1918, ZDB-ID 534666-6, S. 43–47, hier S. 46, online (PDF; 9,1 MB).
- "Verzeichnis der bisher in der Umgegend Aachens gefundenen Macro-Lepidoptera". In: Deutsche entomologische Zeitschrift „Iris“ Bd. 51, 1937, S. 1–100, (posthum, Originalmanuskript von 1888 bis 1927).

== General and cited references ==
- Pfaff, G. & Wrede, O. H. 1934 [Püngeler, R.] Festschrift, 50jähriges Bestehen I.E.V. DEI.
