= Idaea sympractor =

Scientific classification
- Kingdom: Animalia
- Phylum: Arthropoda
- Clade: Pancrustacea
- Class: Insecta
- Order: Lepidoptera
- Family: Geometridae
- Genus: Idaea
- Species: I. sympractor

Binomial name
- Idaea sympractor (Prout, 1932)

Synonyms
- Sterrha sympractor Prout, 1932

Species of moth

Idaea sympractor is a moth of the family Geometridae. It is found in northern Madagascar.

this species has a wingspan of 13-15mm, it is similar to Idaea lycaugidia but in average smaller and browner, with stronger grey irrorations or suffusions.
