= Leptacme =

Leptacme may refer to:

- Leptacme (moth), a moth genus in the family Geometridae
- Leptacme (gastropod), a snail genus in the family Clausiliidae
