= Aphrogeneia =

Aphrogeneia ("foam-sprung") may refer to:

- Aphrogeneia, an ephitet of the goddess Aphrodite
- Aphrogeneia, a synonym for the moth genus Idaea
