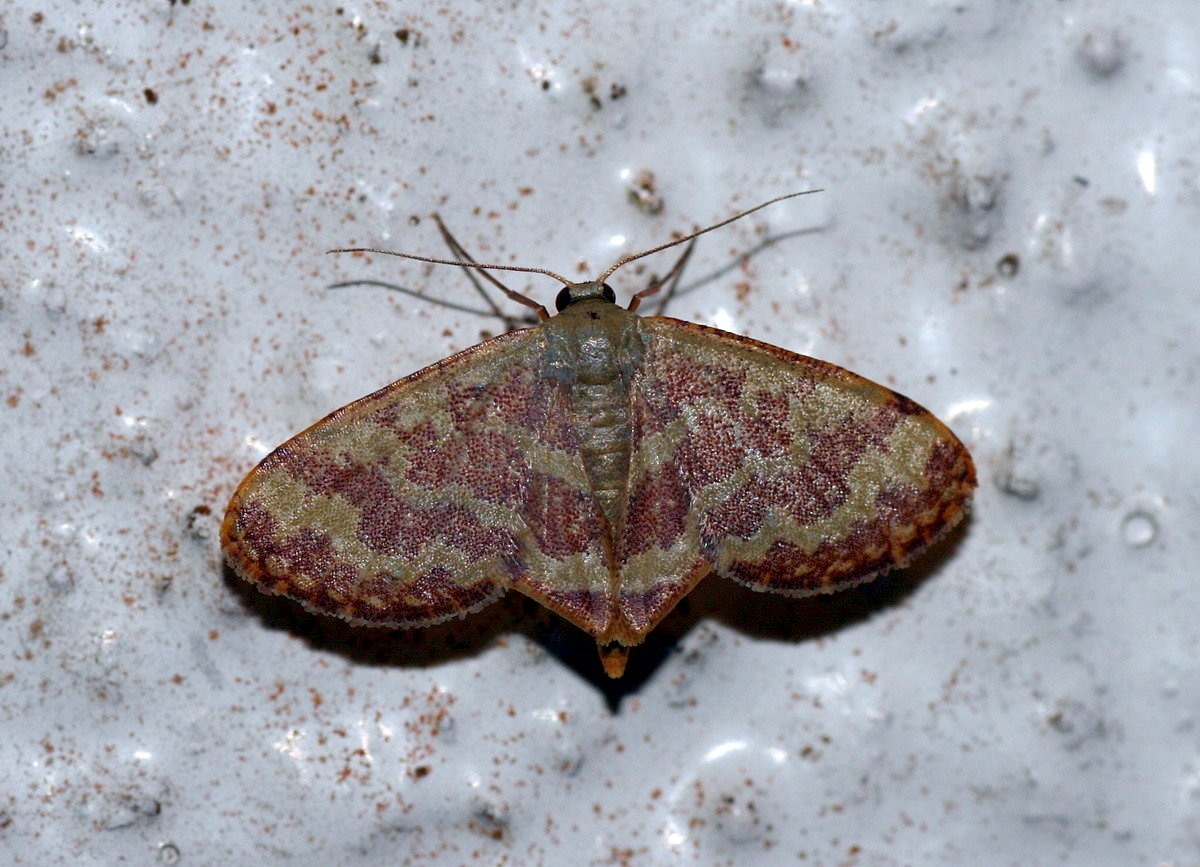

Scientific classification
- Kingdom: Animalia
- Phylum: Arthropoda
- Class: Insecta
- Order: Lepidoptera
- Family: Geometridae
- Genus: Idaea
- Species: I. phoenicoptera

Binomial name
- Idaea phoenicoptera (Hampson, 1896)

Synonyms
- Acidalia triangularis Hampson, 1896; Eois glabripennis Warren, 1900

= Lophophleps phoenicoptera =

Species of moth

Lophophleps phoenicoptera is a species of moth of the family Geometridae first described by George Hampson in 1896. It is found in Sri Lanka, India, Peninsular Malaysia, Java and Borneo.

== Subspecies ==
- Lophophleps phoenicoptera phoenicoptera
- Lophophleps phoenicoptera tuita (Peninsular Malaysia, Java, Borneo)
