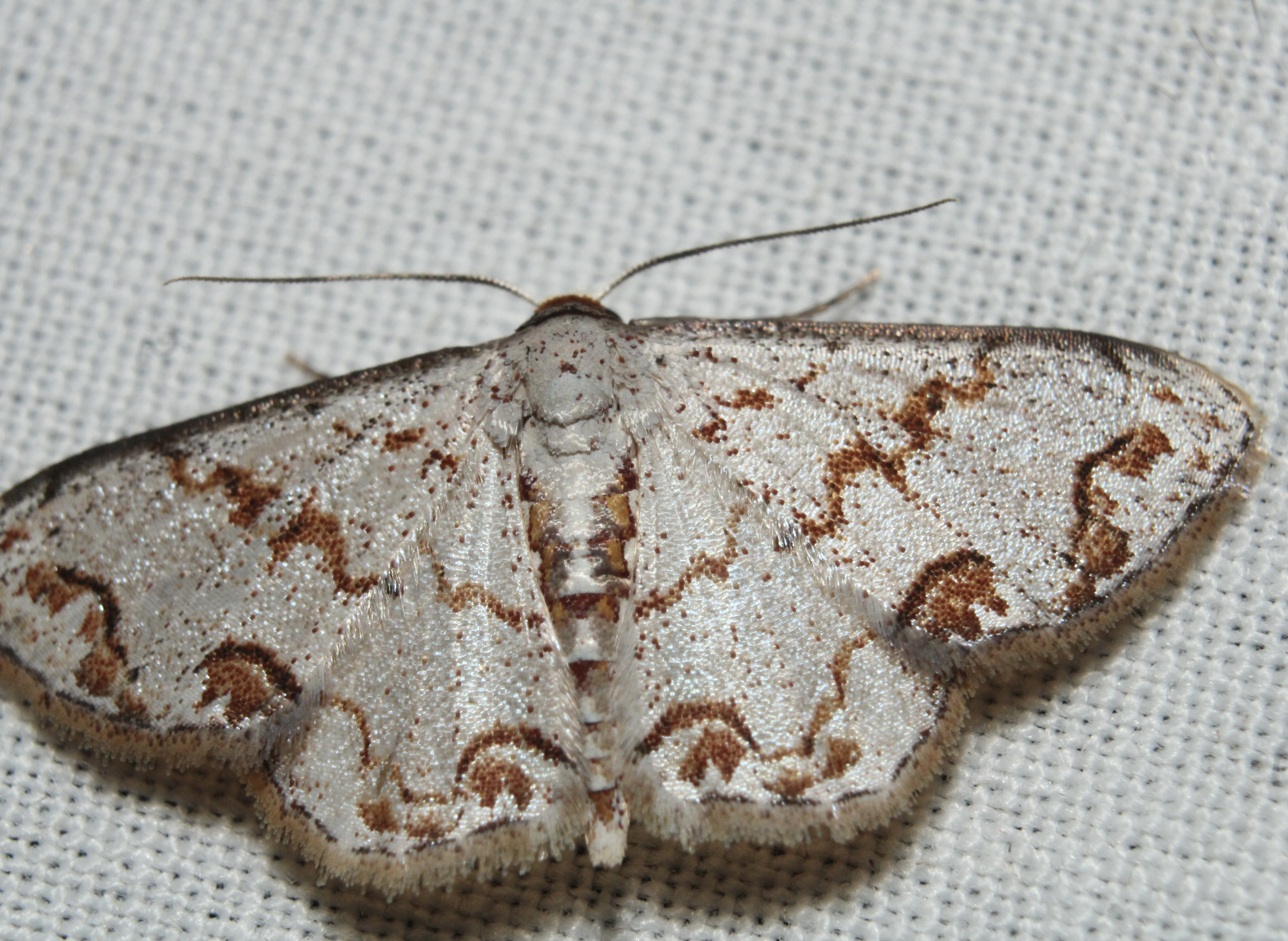

Scientific classification
- Kingdom: Animalia
- Phylum: Arthropoda
- Clade: Pancrustacea
- Class: Insecta
- Order: Lepidoptera
- Family: Geometridae
- Genus: Idaea
- Species: I. expolitata

Binomial name
- Idaea expolitata Guenée, 1858

= Idaea expolitata =

Idaea expolitata is a moth in the family Geometridae. They are primarily found in the rainforests of Brazil, Guyana, and Bolivia.
