= Idaea actiosaria =

Scientific classification
- Kingdom: Animalia
- Phylum: Arthropoda
- Clade: Pancrustacea
- Class: Insecta
- Order: Lepidoptera
- Family: Geometridae
- Genus: Idaea
- Species: I. actiosaria

Binomial name
- Idaea actiosaria Walker, 1861

Species of moth

Idaea actiosaria is a moth of the family Geometridae first described by Francis Walker in 1861. It is found in Sri Lanka.
