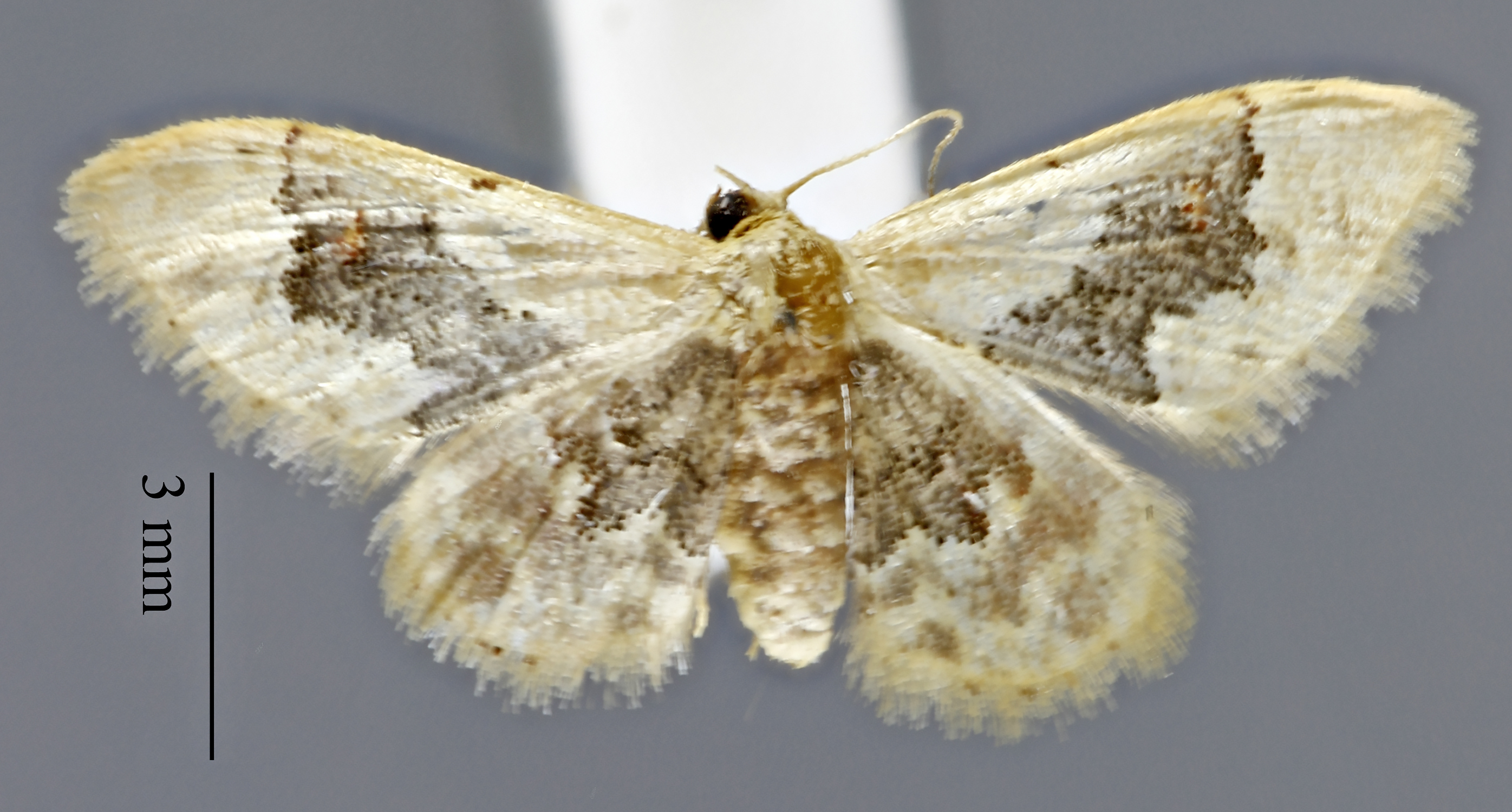

Scientific classification
- Kingdom: Animalia
- Phylum: Arthropoda
- Clade: Pancrustacea
- Class: Insecta
- Order: Lepidoptera
- Family: Geometridae
- Genus: Idaea
- Species: I. occidentaria

Binomial name
- Idaea occidentaria (Packard, 1873)

= Idaea occidentaria =

Species of moth

Idaea occidentaria is a species of geometrid moth in the family Geometridae. It is found in North America.

The MONA or Hodges number for Idaea occidentaria is 7117.
