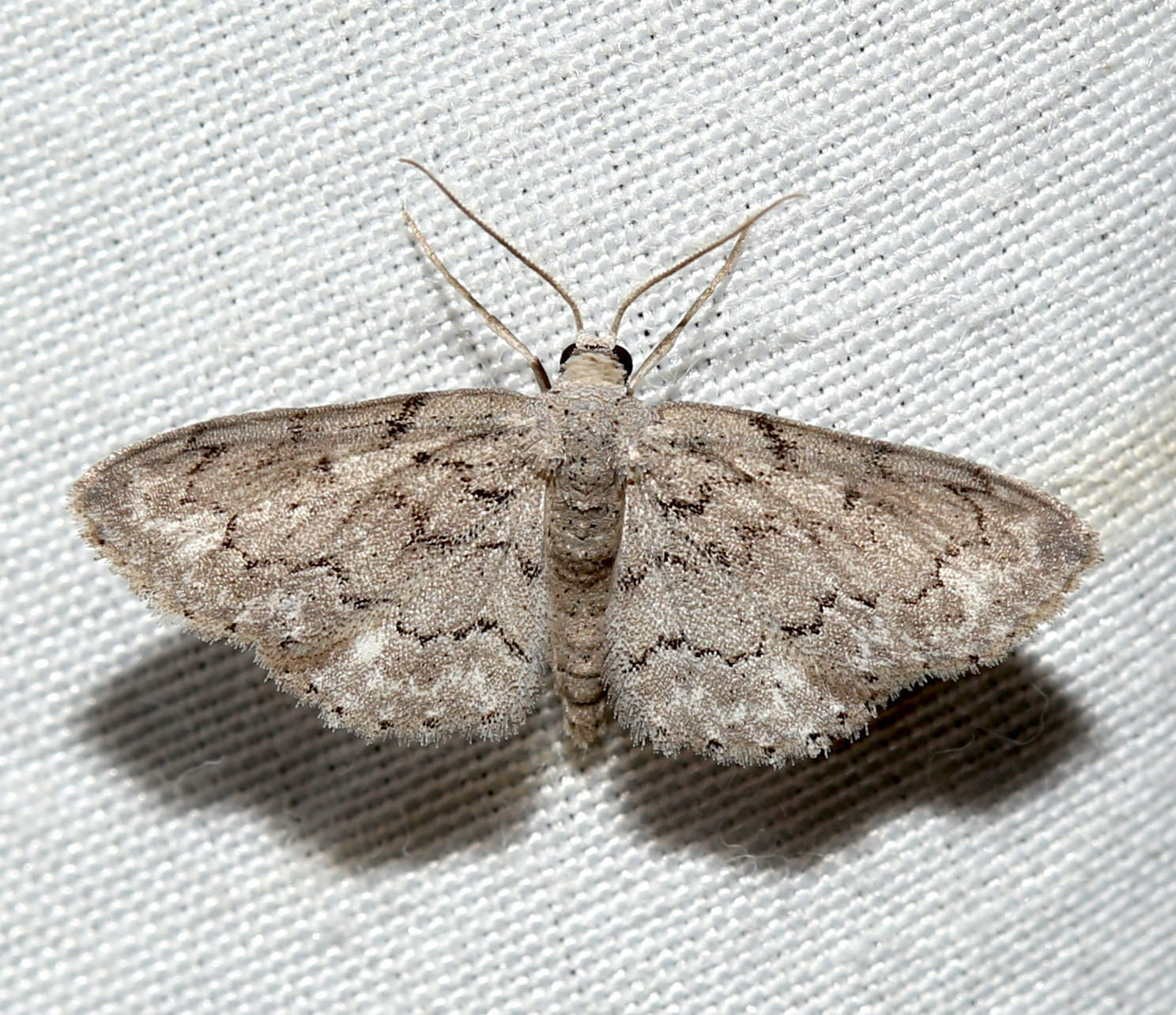

Scientific classification
- Kingdom: Animalia
- Phylum: Arthropoda
- Clade: Pancrustacea
- Class: Insecta
- Order: Lepidoptera
- Family: Geometridae
- Genus: Idaea
- Species: I. violacearia

Binomial name
- Idaea violacearia (Walker, 1861)

= Idaea violacearia =

Species of moth

Idaea violacearia is a species of geometrid moth in the family Geometridae. It is found in North America.
