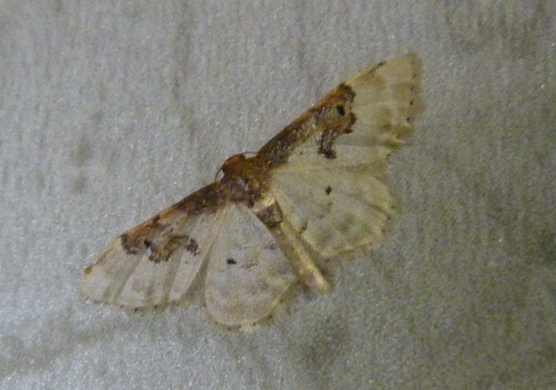
- (Tàrrega, Catalonia)

Scientific classification
- Kingdom: Animalia
- Phylum: Arthropoda
- Clade: Pancrustacea
- Class: Insecta
- Order: Lepidoptera
- Family: Geometridae
- Genus: Idaea
- Species: I. mustelata

Binomial name
- Idaea mustelata (Gumppenberg, 1892)

Synonyms
- Dosithea mustelata

= Idaea mustelata =

Species of moth

Idaea mustelata is a moth of the family Geometridae. In Europe it is only found on the Iberian Peninsula. It is also found in North Africa, from Morocco up to Western Algeria. It was considered a subspecies of Idaea rusticata up to 2004 when it was re-instated at species level by Axel Hausmann.

The wingspan is 12–16 mm. The moth flies from July to August depending on the location.

The larval food plants are unknown
