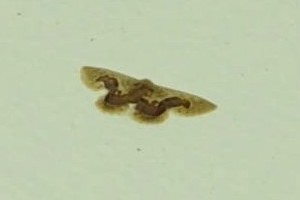

Scientific classification
- Kingdom: Animalia
- Phylum: Arthropoda
- Clade: Pancrustacea
- Class: Insecta
- Order: Lepidoptera
- Family: Geometridae
- Genus: Idaea
- Species: I. gemmaria

Binomial name
- Idaea gemmaria Hampson, 1896

= Idaea gemmaria =

Species of moth

Idaea gemmaria is a moth of the family Geometridae first described by George Hampson in 1896. It is found in Sri Lanka.
