= Idaea retractaria =

Scientific classification
- Kingdom: Animalia
- Phylum: Arthropoda
- Clade: Pancrustacea
- Class: Insecta
- Order: Lepidoptera
- Family: Geometridae
- Genus: Idaea
- Species: I. retractaria

Binomial name
- Idaea retractaria (Walker, 1861)

Species of moth

Idaea retractaria is a species of geometrid moth in the family Geometridae. It was described by Francis Walker in 1861 and is found in North America.

The MONA or Hodges number for Idaea retractaria is 7124.
