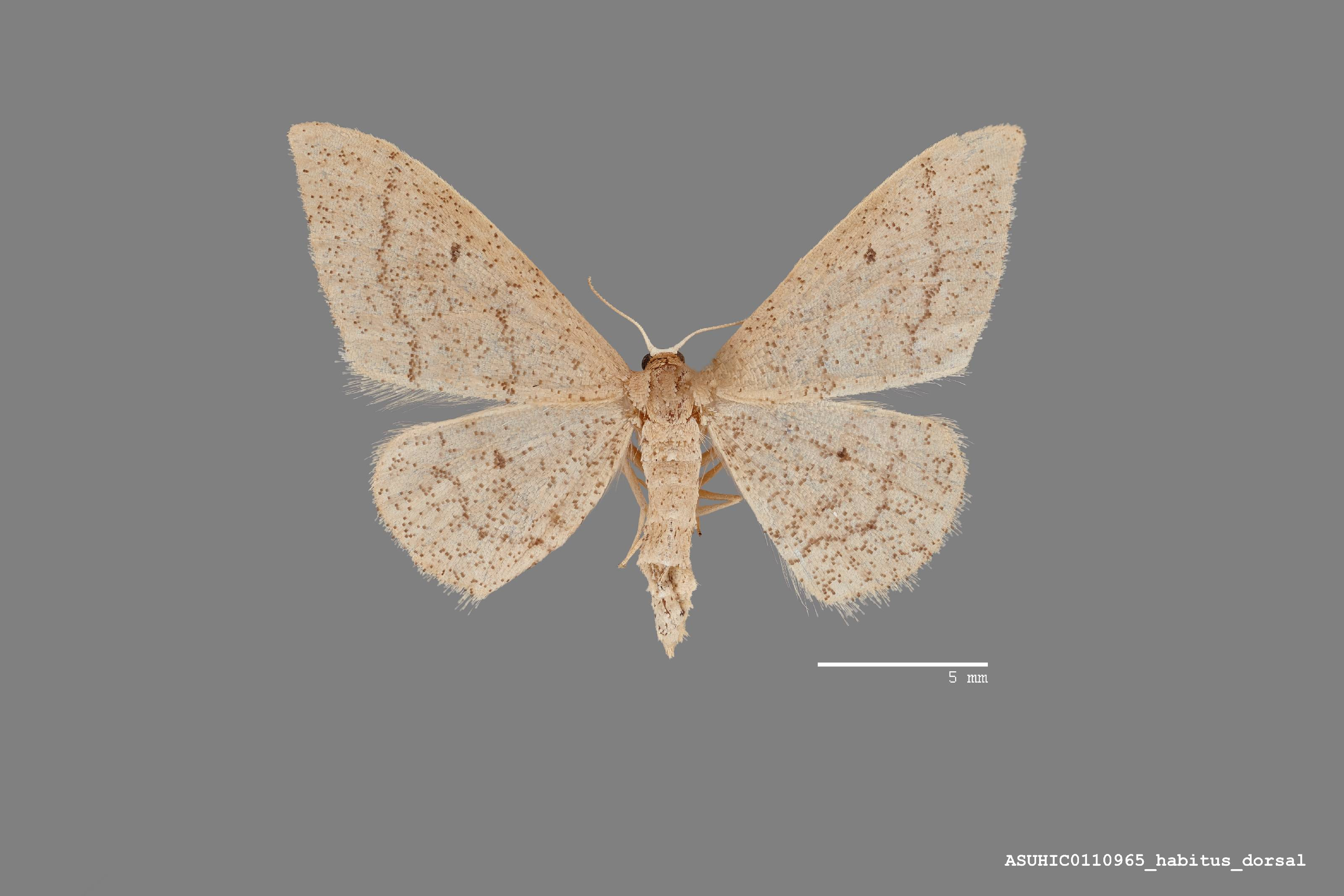

Scientific classification
- Kingdom: Animalia
- Phylum: Arthropoda
- Clade: Pancrustacea
- Class: Insecta
- Order: Lepidoptera
- Family: Geometridae
- Genus: Idaea
- Species: I. productata

Binomial name
- Idaea productata (Packard, 1876)

= Idaea productata =

Species of moth

Idaea productata is a species of geometrid moth in the family Geometridae. It was described by Alpheus Spring Packard in 1876 and is found in North America.

The MONA or Hodges number for Idaea productata is 7112.
