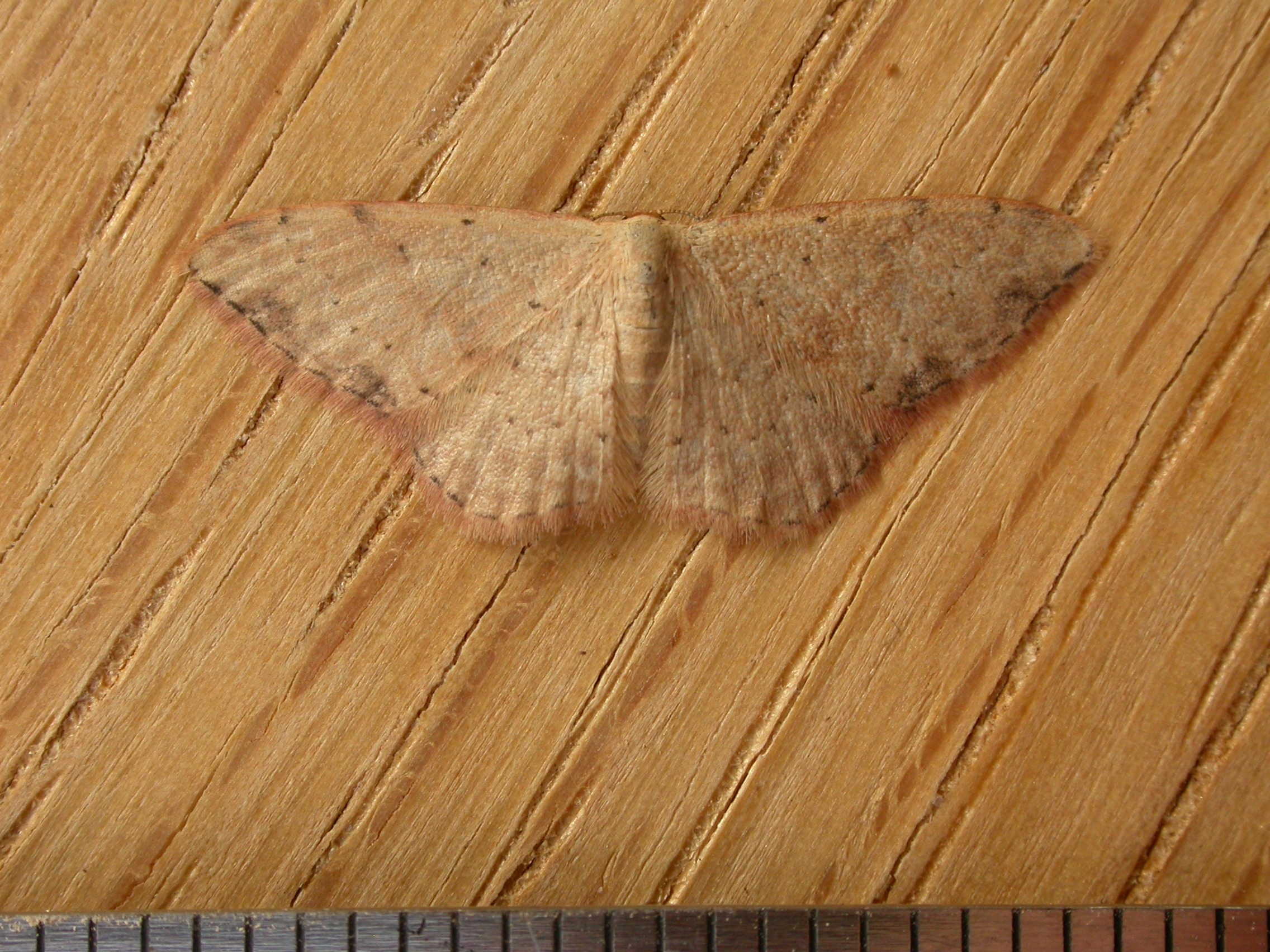

Scientific classification
- Kingdom: Animalia
- Phylum: Arthropoda
- Clade: Pancrustacea
- Class: Insecta
- Order: Lepidoptera
- Family: Geometridae
- Genus: Idaea
- Species: I. halmaea

Binomial name
- Idaea halmaea (Meyrick, 1888)

Synonyms
- Acidalia halmaea Meyrick, 1888

= Idaea halmaea =

Two-spotted wave

Species of moth

Idaea halmaea, the two-spotted wave, is a moth of the family Geometridae. The species was first described by Edward Meyrick in 1888. It is found in Australia, including Tasmania.
