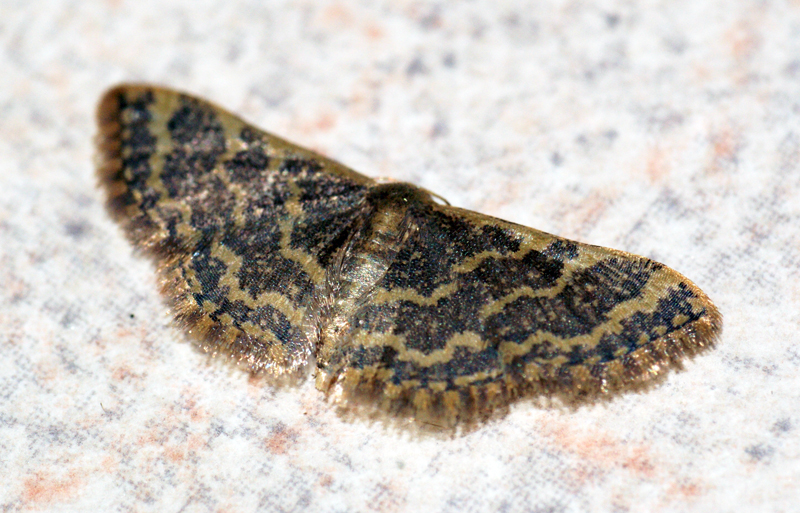

Scientific classification
- Kingdom: Animalia
- Phylum: Arthropoda
- Class: Insecta
- Order: Lepidoptera
- Family: Geometridae
- Genus: Idaea
- Species: I. purpurea

Binomial name
- Idaea purpurea Hampson, 1891

Synonyms
- Lophophleps purpurea Hampson, 1891

= Idaea purpurea =

Species of moth

Idaea purpurea is a moth of the family Geometridae first described by George Hampson in 1891. It is found in India, Sri Lanka, Taiwan, the Andaman Islands, Peninsular Malaysia and Borneo.

The adult has dull yellow wings with forewing facies and purple-grey banding. Male has broad yellowish costal zone to the hindwing. Female has definite yellow fasciation. Host plants of caterpillar include Shorea species.

== Gallery ==
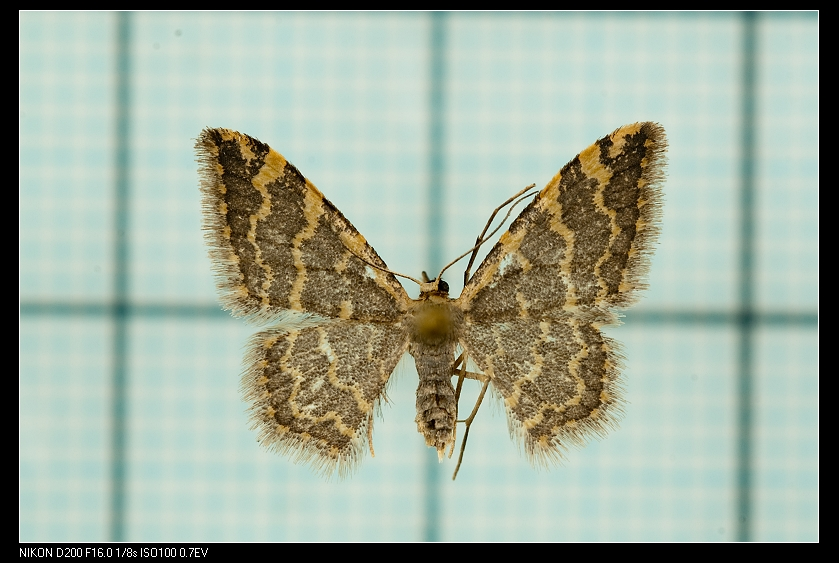

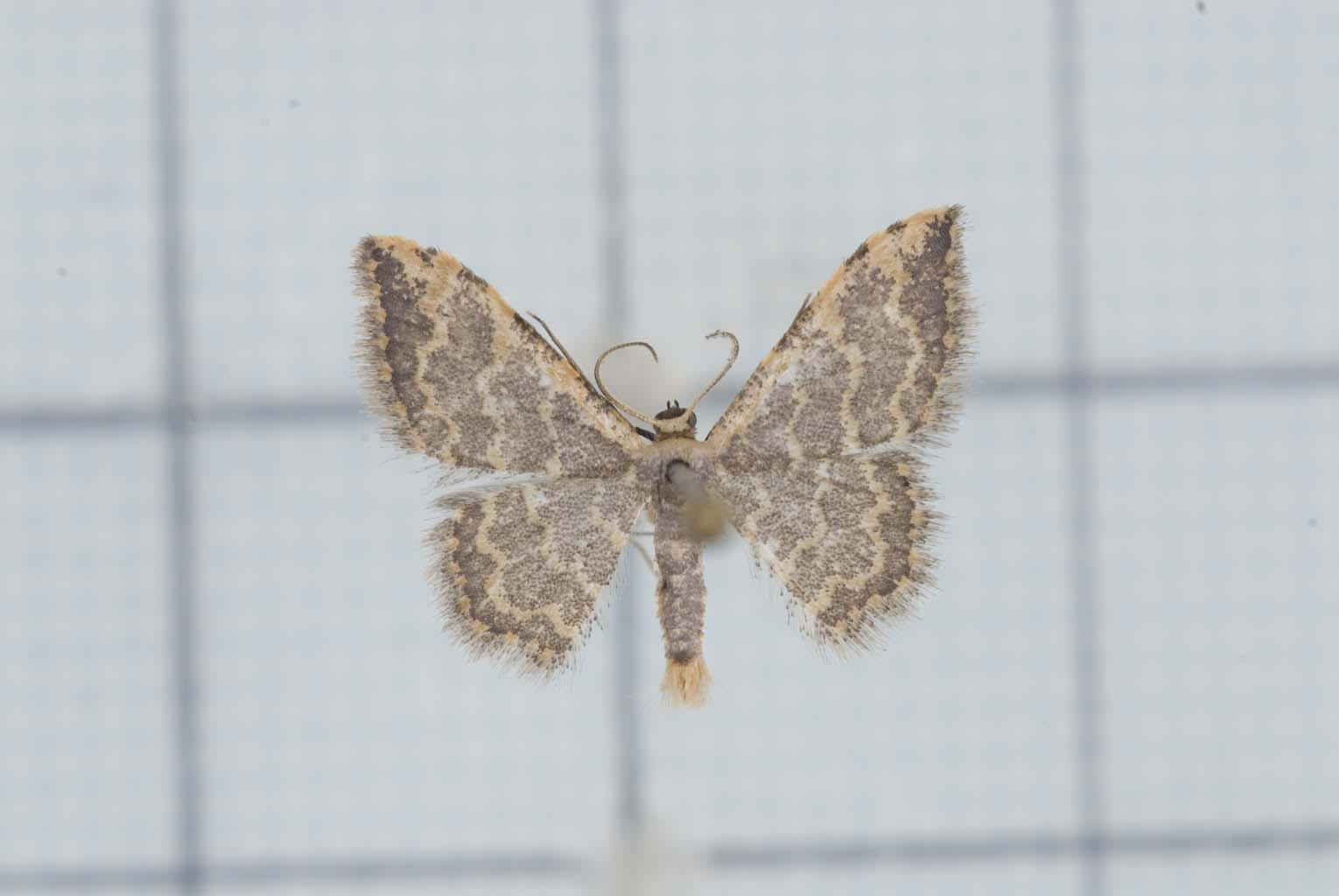

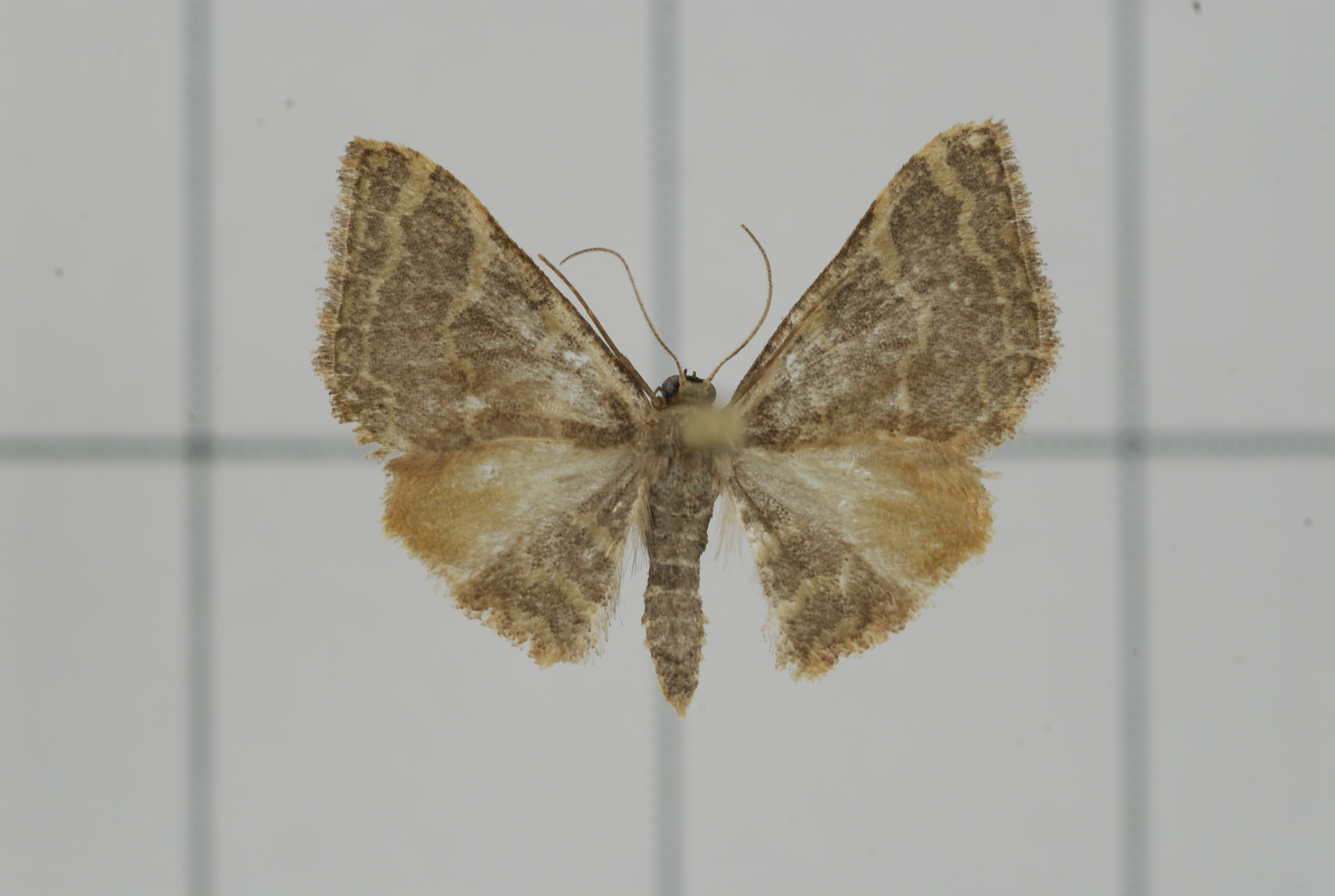
