= Idaea marcidaria =

Scientific classification
- Kingdom: Animalia
- Phylum: Arthropoda
- Class: Insecta
- Order: Lepidoptera
- Family: Geometridae
- Genus: Idaea
- Species: I. marcidaria

Binomial name
- Idaea marcidaria Walker, 1861

Synonyms
- Hyria? marcidaria Walker, 1861; Sterrha rufula Swinhoe, 1903; Sterrha swinhoei Prout, 1932

Species of moth

Idaea marcidaria is a moth of the family Geometridae first described by Francis Walker in 1861. It is found in Sri Lanka, Myanmar, China, Taiwan, Singapore and Borneo.

The wings are yellowish with a dark fasciae.The Male has the forewing costa somewhat folded longitudinally.
