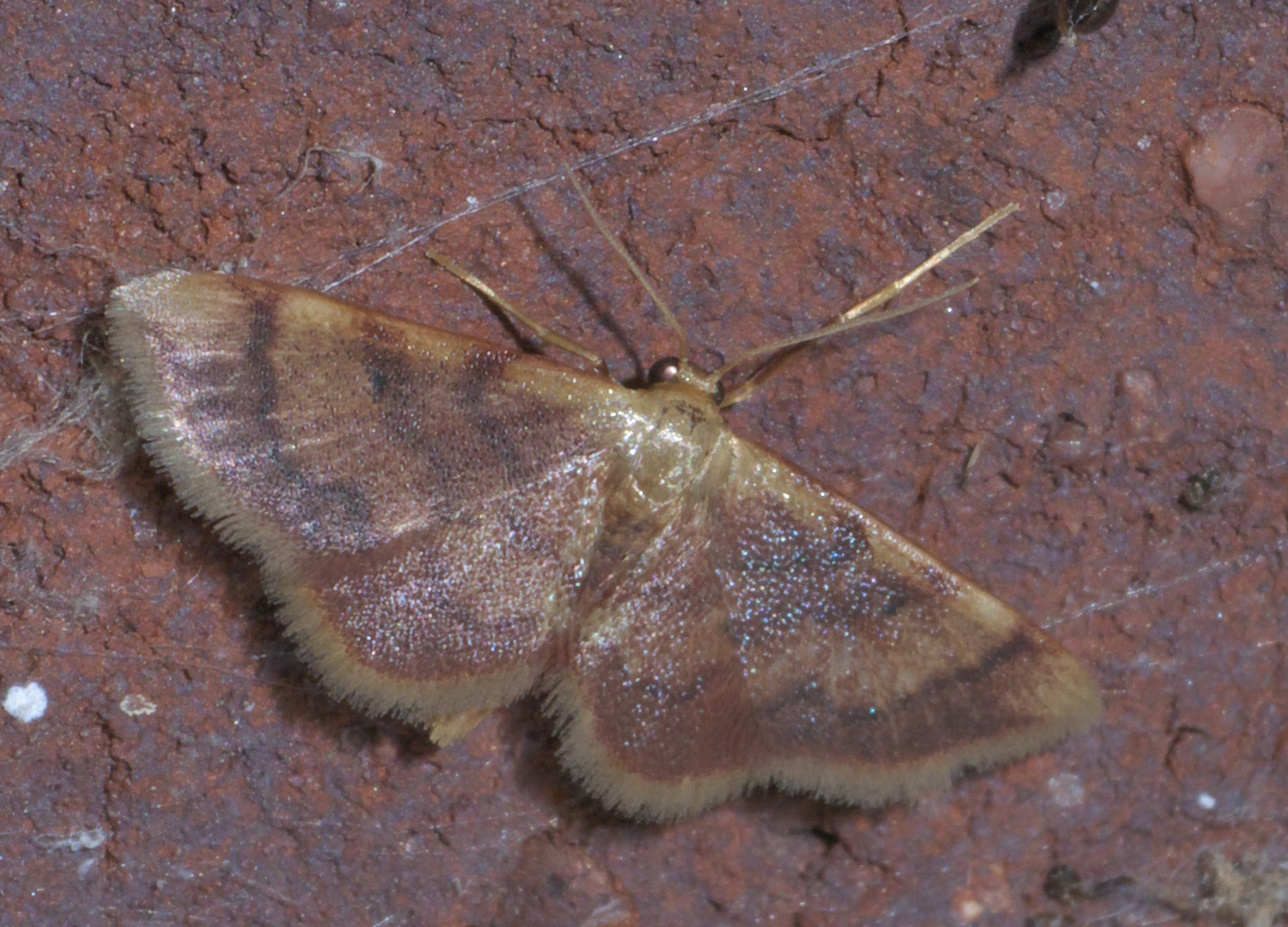

Scientific classification
- Kingdom: Animalia
- Phylum: Arthropoda
- Clade: Pancrustacea
- Class: Insecta
- Order: Lepidoptera
- Family: Geometridae
- Tribe: Sterrhini
- Genus: Idaea
- Species: I. demissaria

Binomial name
- Idaea demissaria (Hubner, 1831)

= Idaea demissaria =

Species of moth

Idaea demissaria, the red-bordered wave moth, is a species of geometrid moth in the family Geometridae. It is found in North America.

The MONA or Hodges number for Idaea demissaria is 7114.

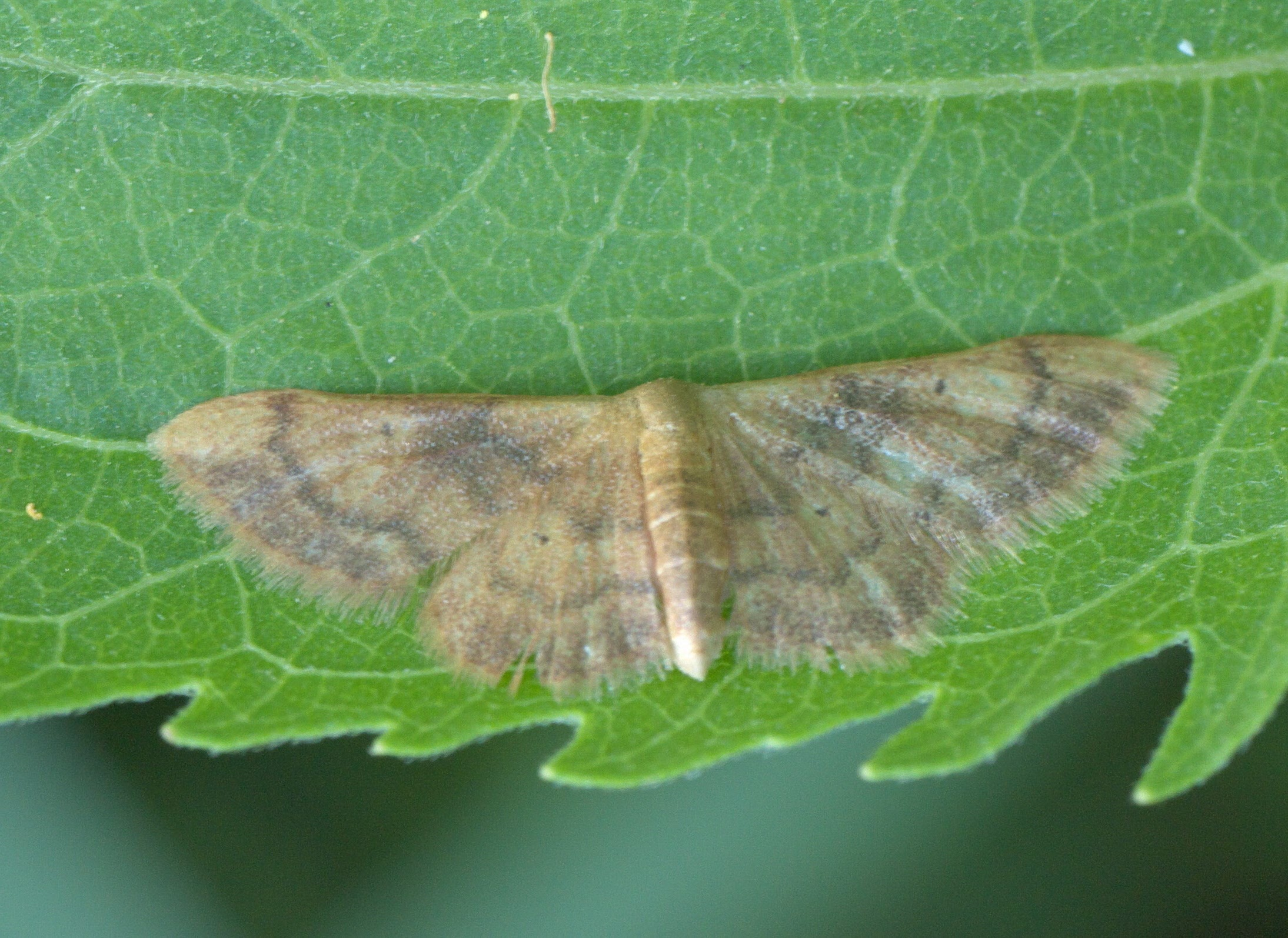
Red-bordered wave moth, Idaea demissaria

== Subspecies ==
These three subspecies belong to the species Idaea demissaria:

- Idaea demissaria columbia McDunnough, 1927
- Idaea demissaria demissaria
- Idaea demissaria ferrugata Packard, 1876
