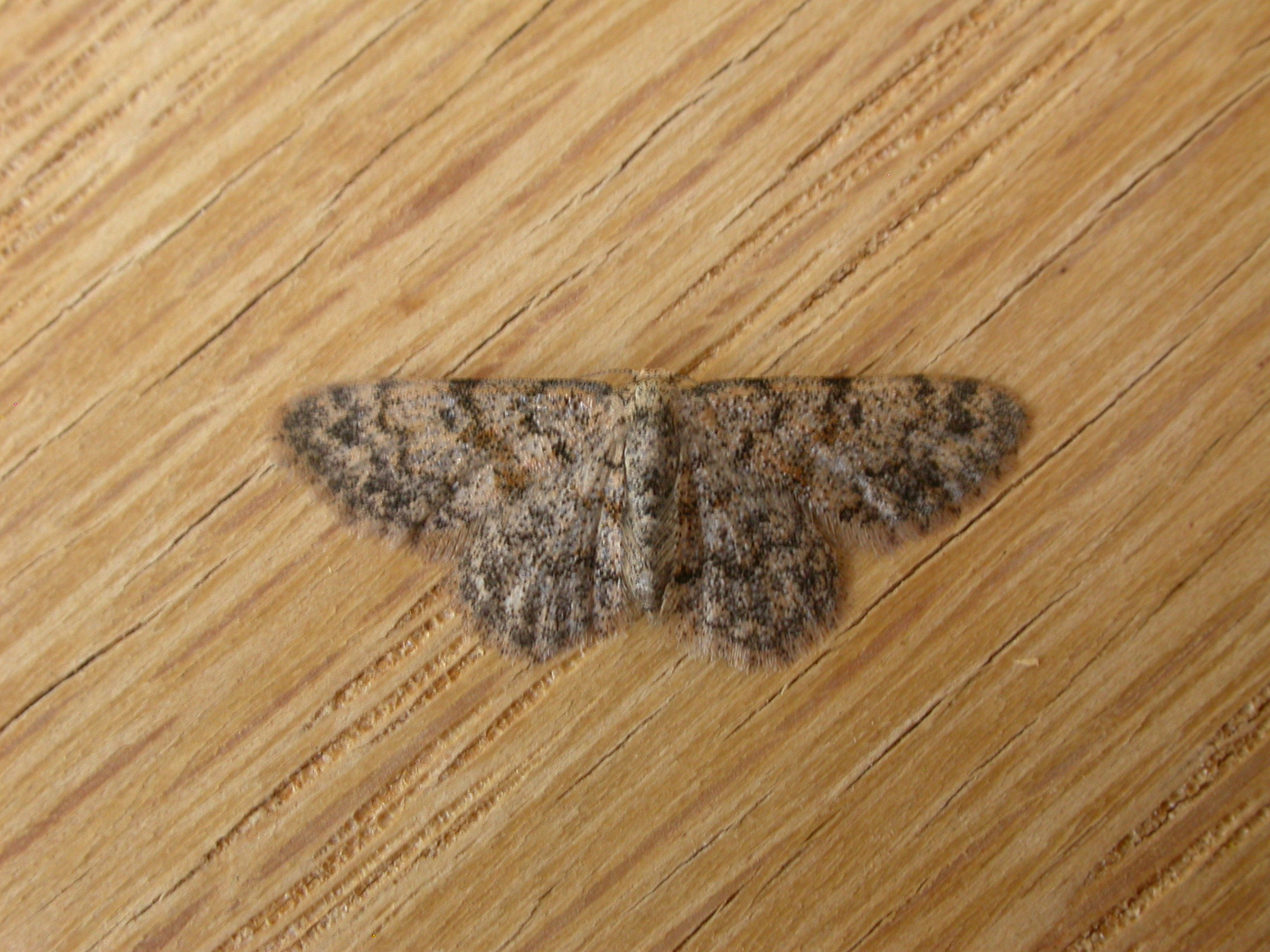

Scientific classification
- Kingdom: Animalia
- Phylum: Arthropoda
- Clade: Pancrustacea
- Class: Insecta
- Order: Lepidoptera
- Family: Geometridae
- Genus: Idaea
- Species: I. ferrilinea

Binomial name
- Idaea ferrilinea Warren, 1900

Synonyms
- Eois cletima Turner, 1908

= Idaea ferrilinea =

Species of moth

Idaea ferrilinea is a species of moth of the family Geometridae. It is found in Australia.
