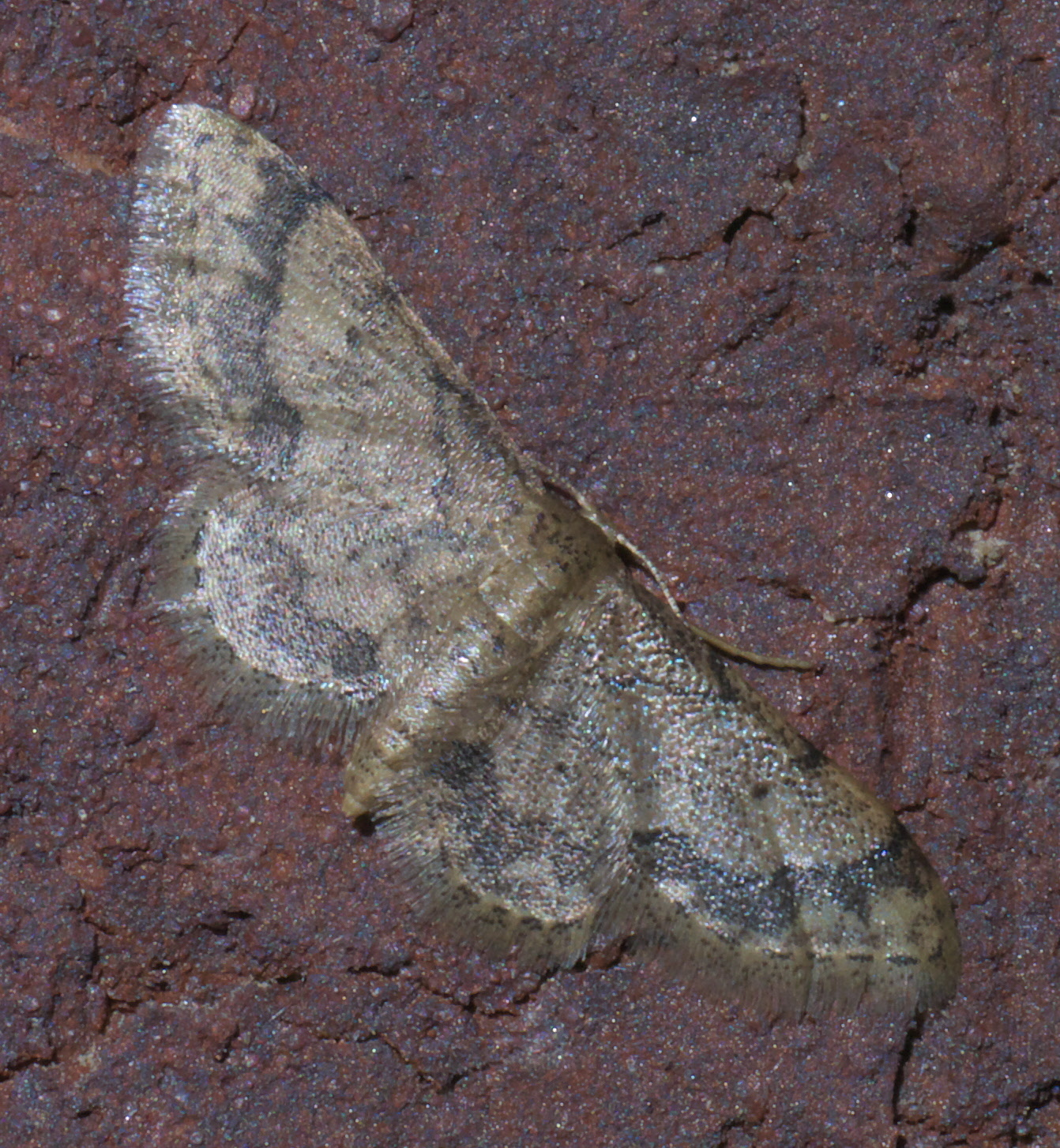

Scientific classification
- Kingdom: Animalia
- Phylum: Arthropoda
- Clade: Pancrustacea
- Class: Insecta
- Order: Lepidoptera
- Family: Geometridae
- Tribe: Sterrhini
- Genus: Idaea
- Species: I. celtima

Binomial name
- Idaea celtima (Schaus, 1901)

= Idaea celtima =

Species of moth

Idaea celtima is a species of geometrid moth in the family Geometridae. It is found in North America.

The MONA or Hodges number for Idaea celtima is 7109.

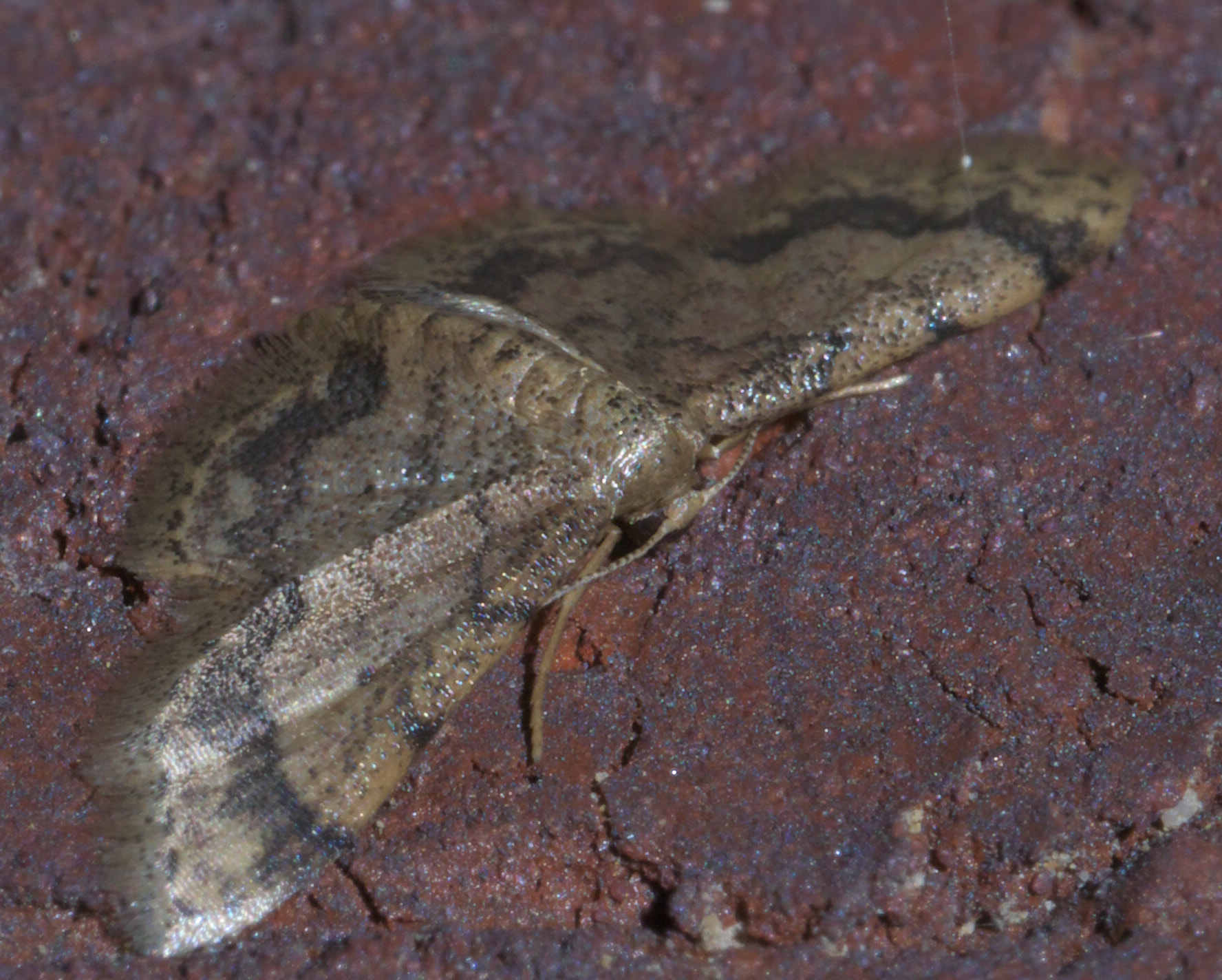
