= Idaea semisericea =

Scientific classification
- Kingdom: Animalia
- Phylum: Arthropoda
- Clade: Pancrustacea
- Class: Insecta
- Order: Lepidoptera
- Family: Geometridae
- Genus: Idaea
- Species: I. semisericea

Binomial name
- Idaea semisericea (Warren, 1897)

Synonyms
- Ptychopoda semisericea Warren, 1897; Ptychopoda comparanda Warren, 1900

Species of moth

Idaea semisericea is a moth of the family Geometridae first described by Warren in 1897. It is found in the north-eastern Himalayas of India, Sri Lanka, Borneo, Java and the Philippines.

Adult has deep greyish wings with darker fasciae. Host plants of the caterpillar include Falcataria moluccana.

Two subspecies are recognized.

- Sterrha comparanda neanica Prout, 1938 - Borneo
- Sterrha comparanda trettesensis Prout 1938 - Java
