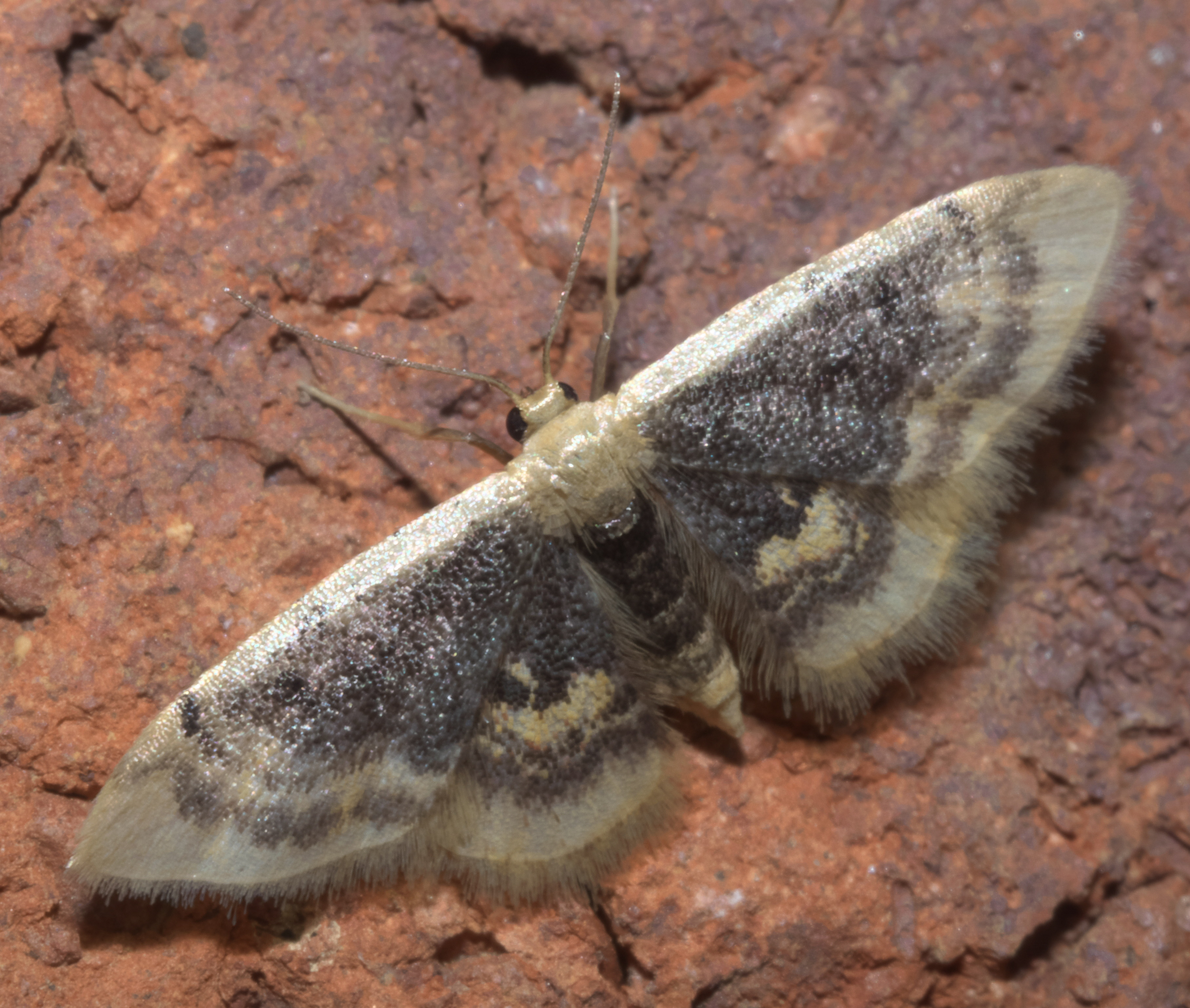

Scientific classification
- Kingdom: Animalia
- Phylum: Arthropoda
- Clade: Pancrustacea
- Class: Insecta
- Order: Lepidoptera
- Family: Geometridae
- Genus: Idaea
- Species: I. scintillularia

Binomial name
- Idaea scintillularia (Hulst, 1888)

= Idaea scintillularia =

Species of moth

Idaea scintillularia, the diminutive wave, is a species of geometrid moth in the family Geometridae. It is found in North America.

The MONA or Hodges number for Idaea scintillularia is 7105.
