= Idaea phoenicoglauca =

Scientific classification
- Kingdom: Animalia
- Phylum: Arthropoda
- Clade: Pancrustacea
- Class: Insecta
- Order: Lepidoptera
- Family: Geometridae
- Genus: Idaea
- Species: I. phoenicoglauca

Binomial name
- Idaea phoenicoglauca Hampson, 1907

Species of moth

Idaea phoenicoglauca is a moth of the family Geometridae, and was first described by George Hampson, in 1907. It is found in Sri Lanka.
