= Idaea orilochia =

Scientific classification
- Kingdom: Animalia
- Phylum: Arthropoda
- Clade: Pancrustacea
- Class: Insecta
- Order: Lepidoptera
- Family: Geometridae
- Genus: Idaea
- Species: I. orilochia

Binomial name
- Idaea orilochia (H. Druce, 1893)

Synonyms
- Eupithecia orilochia H. Druce, 1893

Species of moth

Idaea orilochia is a moth in the family Geometridae. It was described by Herbert Druce in 1893. It is found in Costa Rica and Panama.

The wingspan is about 19 mm (3/4 in). The forewings and hindwings are very pale fawn-colored with some reddish-brown or dark-brown markings.
