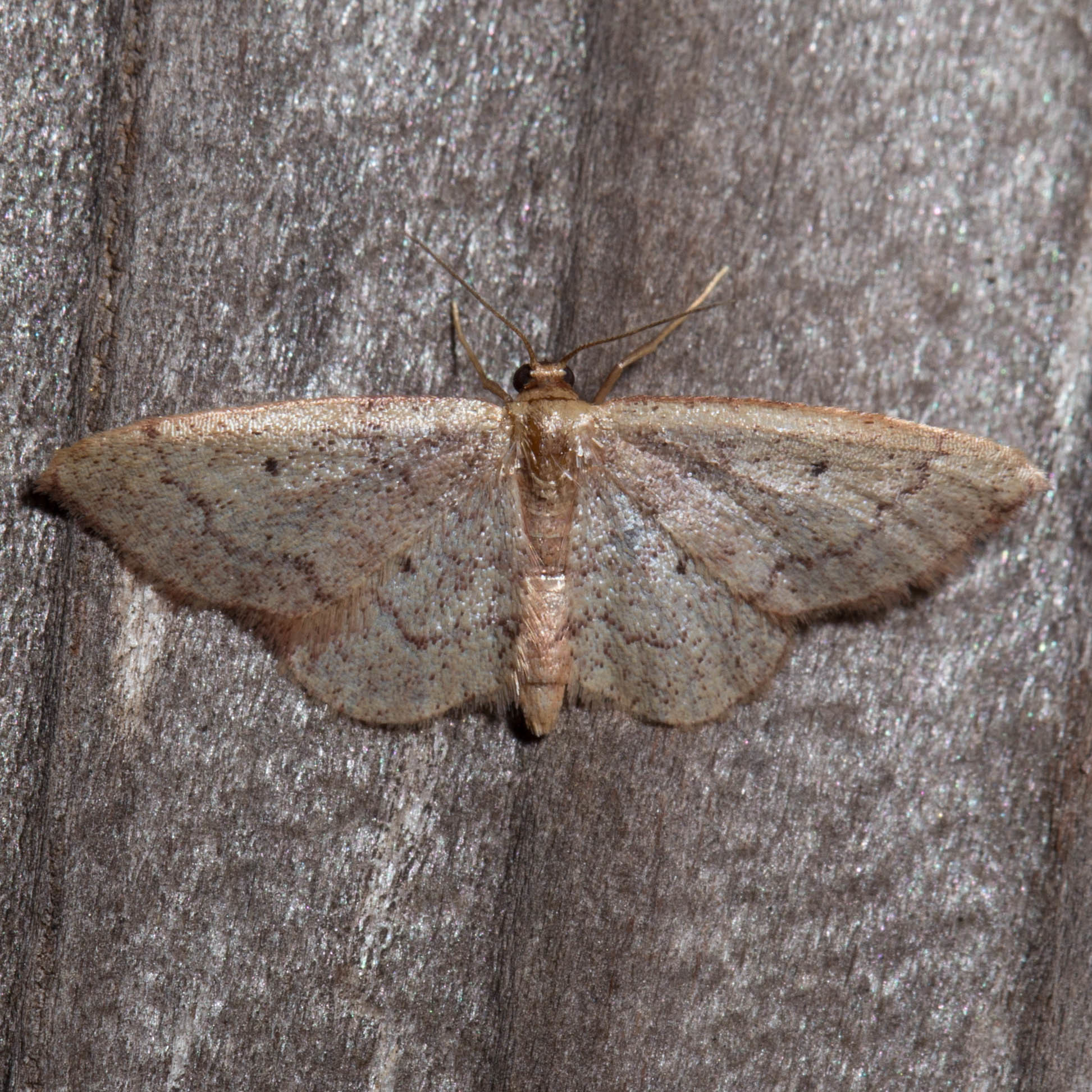

Scientific classification
- Kingdom: Animalia
- Phylum: Arthropoda
- Clade: Pancrustacea
- Class: Insecta
- Order: Lepidoptera
- Family: Geometridae
- Tribe: Sterrhini
- Genus: Idaea
- Species: I. eremiata

Binomial name
- Idaea eremiata (Hulst, 1887)

= Idaea eremiata =

Species of moth

Idaea eremiata, the straw wave moth, is a species of geometrid moth in the family Geometridae. It is found in North America.

The MONA or Hodges number for Idaea eremiata is 7115.
