= Idaea poecilocrossa =

Scientific classification
- Kingdom: Animalia
- Phylum: Arthropoda
- Clade: Pancrustacea
- Class: Insecta
- Order: Lepidoptera
- Family: Geometridae
- Genus: Idaea
- Species: I. poecilocrossa

Binomial name
- Idaea poecilocrossa (Prout, 1932)

Synonyms
- Sterrha poecilocrossa Prout, 1932

Species of moth

Idaea poecilocrossa is a moth of the family Geometridae. It is found in northern Madagascar and on the Seychelles.

This species has a wingspan of 9-13mm. The forewings are narrow with a very long cell; whitish; easily recognizable by its thick sinuous postmedian line placed close to termen and its violet-grey subterminal shading, brown costal edge and fringe. The cell dot is black, median line nearly straight. The hindwings are distally similar to the forewings.
