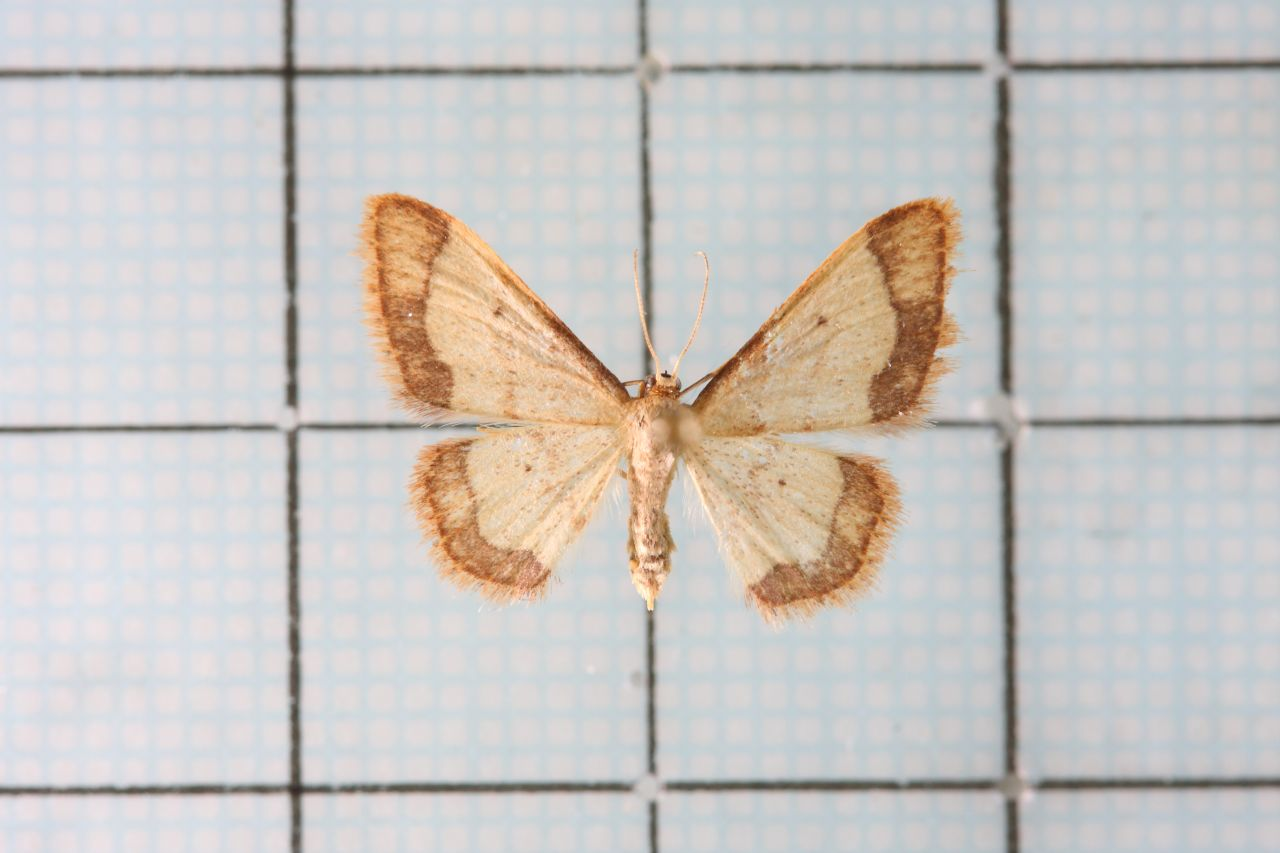

Scientific classification
- Kingdom: Animalia
- Phylum: Arthropoda
- Clade: Pancrustacea
- Class: Insecta
- Order: Lepidoptera
- Family: Geometridae
- Genus: Idaea
- Species: I. sugillata

Binomial name
- Idaea sugillata (Bastelberger, 1911)

Synonyms
- Acidalia sugillata Bastelberger, 1911; Sterrha parallela Wileman & South, 1917

= Idaea sugillata =

Species of moth

Idaea sugillata is a species of moth of the family Geometridae. It is found in Taiwan.

The wingspan is 19–23 mm.
