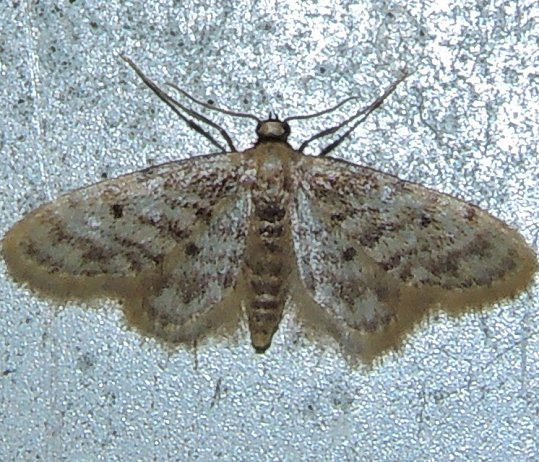

Scientific classification
- Kingdom: Animalia
- Phylum: Arthropoda
- Clade: Pancrustacea
- Class: Insecta
- Order: Lepidoptera
- Family: Geometridae
- Genus: Idaea
- Species: I. bonifata

Binomial name
- Idaea bonifata (Hulst, 1886)

Synonyms
- Eois bonifata Hulst, 1886; Eois delicata Hulst, 1896; Carphoxera ptelearia Riley, 1891

= Idaea bonifata =

Species of moth

Idaea bonifata is a moth in the family Geometridae. It is found in North America, where it has been recorded from Arizona, California, Georgia, Illinois, Kentucky, Maryland, Nevada, New Mexico, Oklahoma, Pennsylvania, Tennessee and Utah.

The length of the forewings is 6–7 mm. Adults are on wing from March to October.

The larvae feed on decaying leaves and stored grains.
