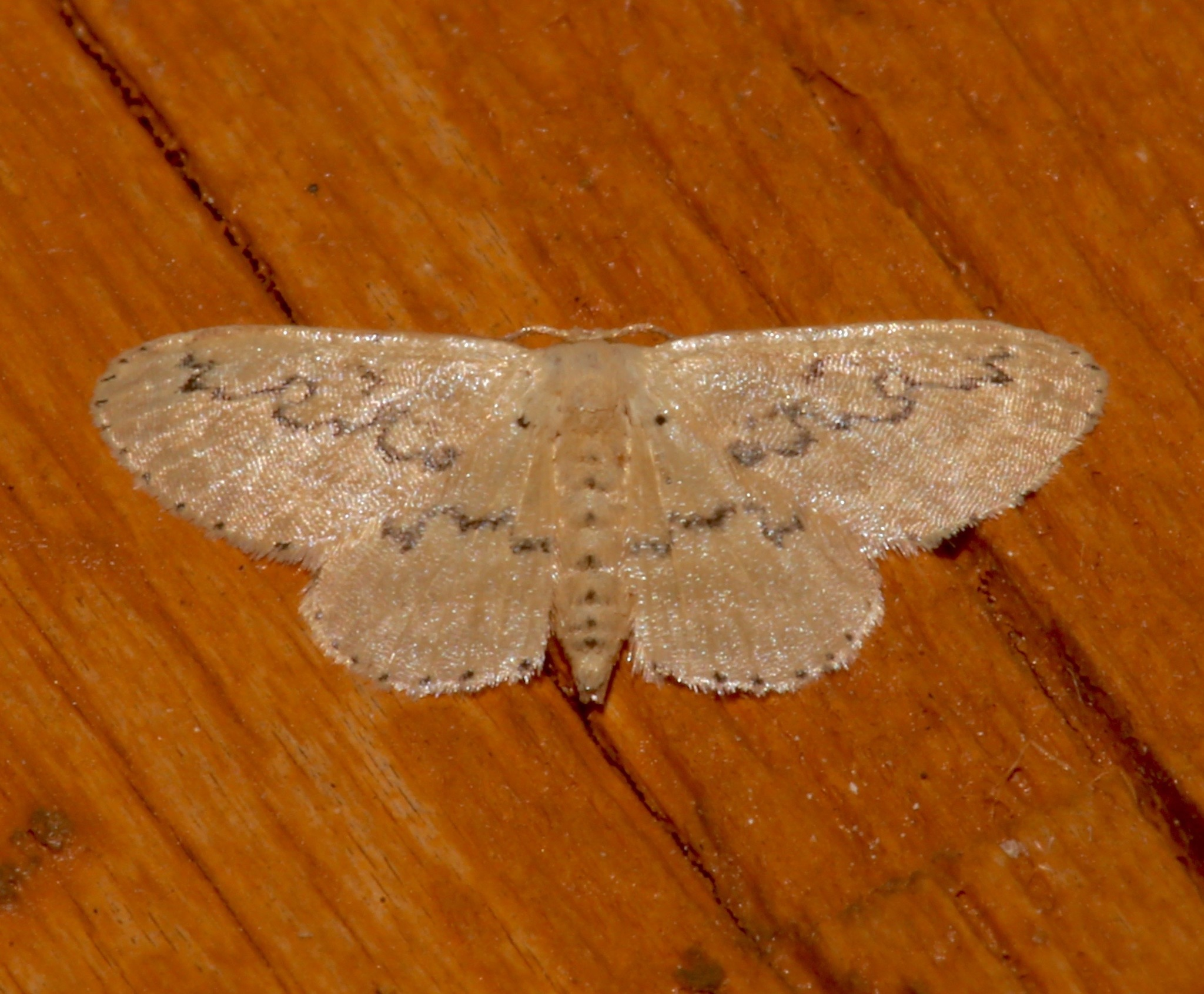

Scientific classification
- Kingdom: Animalia
- Phylum: Arthropoda
- Clade: Pancrustacea
- Class: Insecta
- Order: Lepidoptera
- Family: Geometridae
- Genus: Idaea
- Species: I. hilliata

Binomial name
- Idaea hilliata (Hulst, 1887)

= Idaea hilliata =

Species of moth

Idaea hilliata, or Hill's wave moth, is a species of geometrid moth in the family Geometridae. It is found in North America.

The MONA or Hodges number for Idaea hilliata is 7118.
