= Idaea lineata =

Scientific classification
- Kingdom: Animalia
- Phylum: Arthropoda
- Class: Insecta
- Order: Lepidoptera
- Family: Geometridae
- Genus: Idaea
- Species: I. lineata

Binomial name
- Idaea lineata Hampson, 1893

Species of moth

Idaea lineata is a moth of the family Geometridae first described by George Hampson in 1893. It is found in Sri Lanka.
