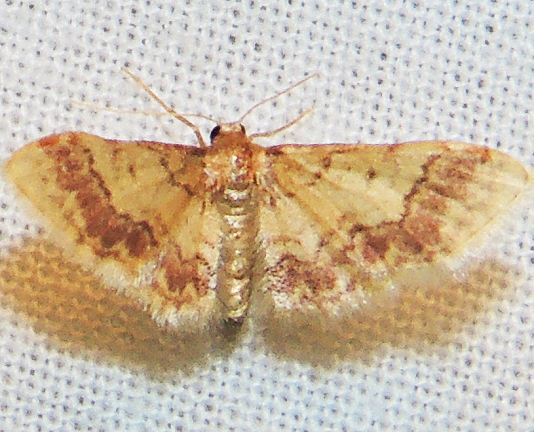

Scientific classification
- Kingdom: Animalia
- Phylum: Arthropoda
- Clade: Pancrustacea
- Class: Insecta
- Order: Lepidoptera
- Family: Geometridae
- Genus: Idaea
- Species: I. furciferata

Binomial name
- Idaea furciferata (Packard, 1873)

Synonyms
- Goniacidalia furciferata Packard, 1873; Eois parvularia Hulst, 1888

= Idaea furciferata =

Species of moth

Idaea furciferata, the notch-winged wave moth, is a moth in the family Geometridae. It is found in North America, where it has been recorded from Maryland to northern Florida, west to Missouri and Texas.

The wingspan is about 17 mm for males and 15 mm for females. Adults are mostly on wing from April to August.

The larvae feed on Trifolium and Taraxacum species.
