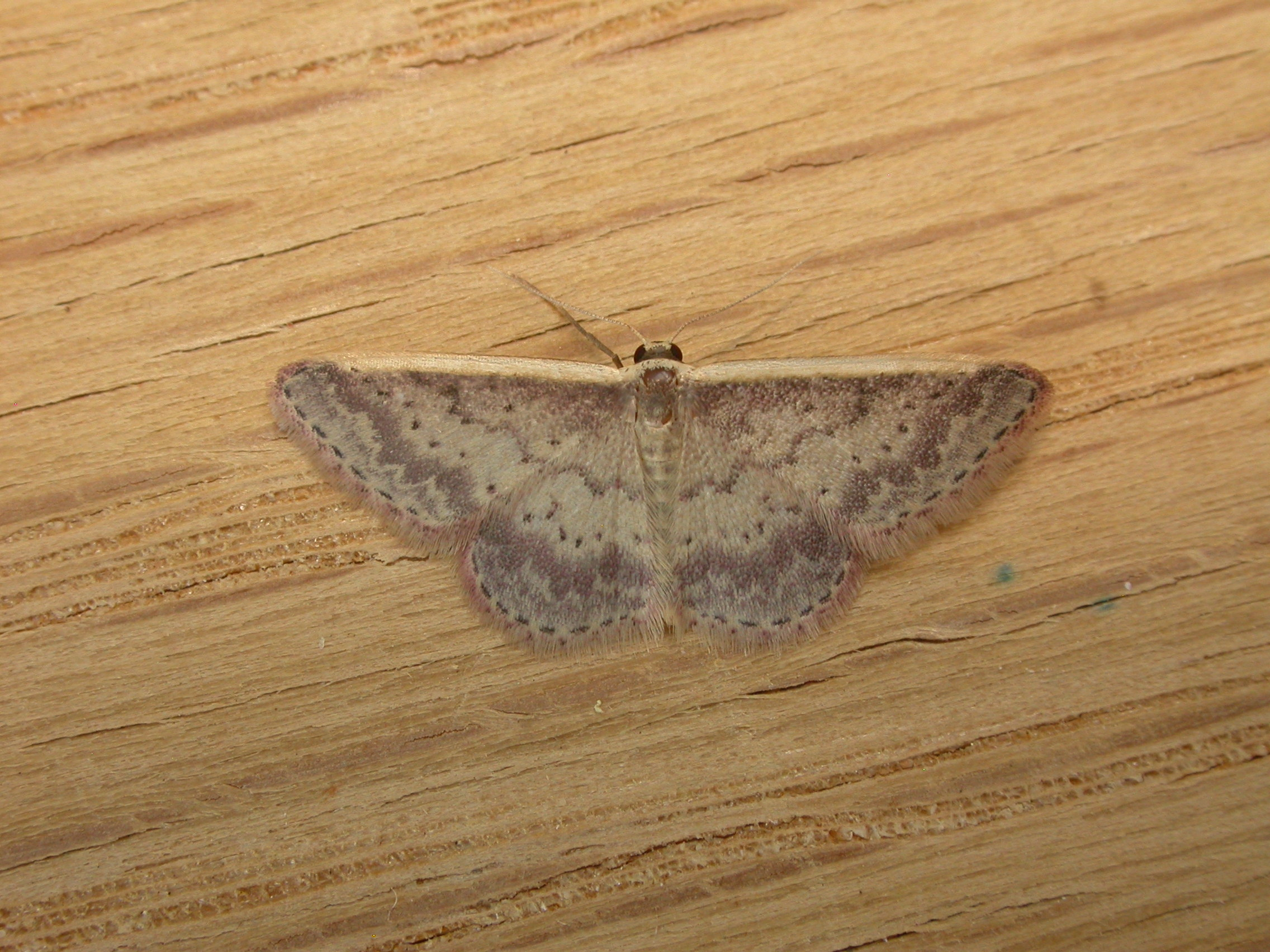

Scientific classification
- Kingdom: Animalia
- Phylum: Arthropoda
- Clade: Pancrustacea
- Class: Insecta
- Order: Lepidoptera
- Family: Geometridae
- Genus: Idaea
- Species: I. nephelota

Binomial name
- Idaea nephelota (Turner, 1908)

Synonyms
- Eois nephelota Turner, 1908

= Idaea nephelota =

Species of moth

Idaea nephelota is a species of moth of the family Geometridae. It is found in Australia.
