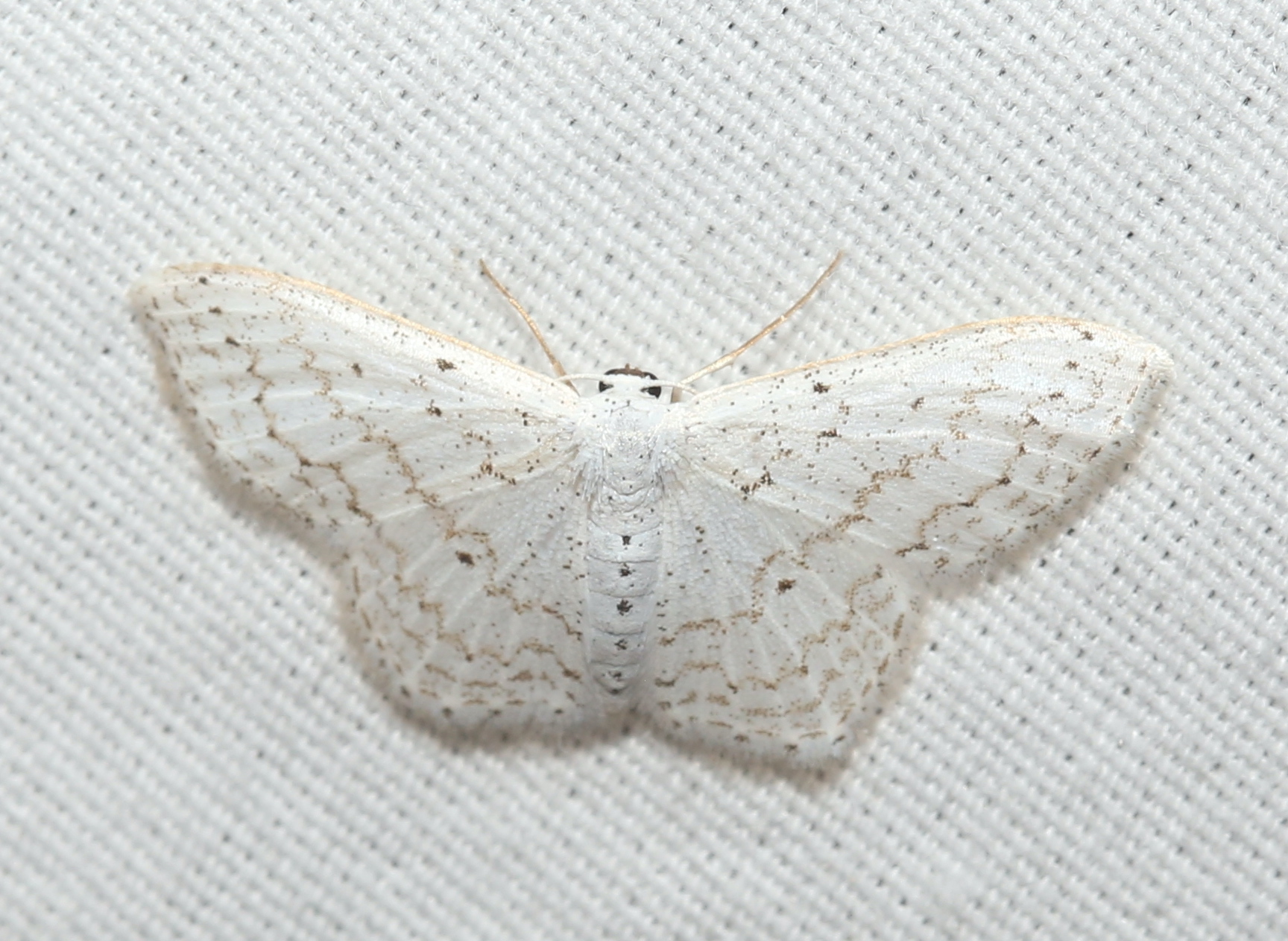

Scientific classification
- Kingdom: Animalia
- Phylum: Arthropoda
- Clade: Pancrustacea
- Class: Insecta
- Order: Lepidoptera
- Family: Geometridae
- Genus: Idaea
- Species: I. tacturata

Binomial name
- Idaea tacturata (Walker, 1861)

Synonyms
- Acidalia tacturata Walker, 1861; Idaea albidula (Hulst, 1896)

= Idaea tacturata =

Dot-lined wave moth

Species of moth

Idaea tacturata, the dot-lined wave moth, is a moth of the family Geometridae. The species was first described by Francis Walker in 1861. It is found in the US from Virginia to Florida, west to south-eastern coastal Texas.

The wingspan is 13–21 mm. They are on wing year round in the southern part of the range.

The larvae feed on Trifolium species.
