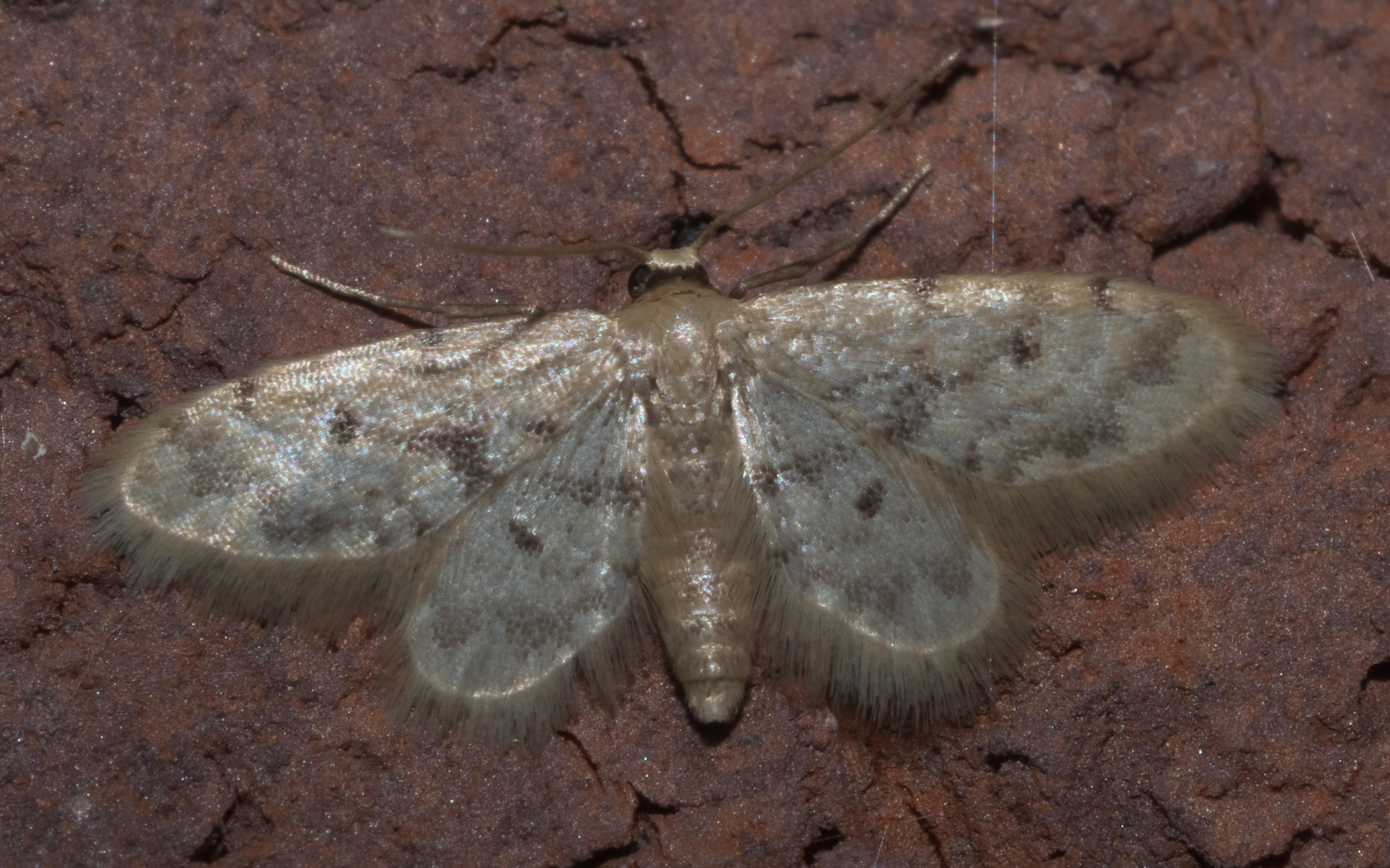

Scientific classification
- Kingdom: Animalia
- Phylum: Arthropoda
- Clade: Pancrustacea
- Class: Insecta
- Order: Lepidoptera
- Family: Geometridae
- Genus: Idaea
- Species: I. minuta

Binomial name
- Idaea minuta (Schaus, 1901)

= Idaea minuta =

Species of moth

Idaea minuta is a species of geometrid moth in the family Geometridae. It is found in North America.

The MONA or Hodges number for Idaea minuta is 7101.
