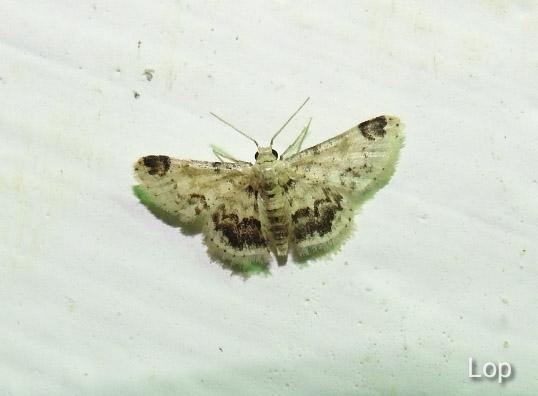
- In Assam, India

Scientific classification
- Kingdom: Animalia
- Phylum: Arthropoda
- Class: Insecta
- Order: Lepidoptera
- Family: Geometridae
- Genus: Idaea
- Species: I. micra

Binomial name
- Idaea micra Hampson, 1893

= Idaea micra =

Species of moth

Idaea micra is a moth of the family Geometridae first described by George Hampson in 1893. It is found in Asia, including Sri Lanka.
