= Idaea tristega =

Scientific classification
- Kingdom: Animalia
- Phylum: Arthropoda
- Clade: Pancrustacea
- Class: Insecta
- Order: Lepidoptera
- Family: Geometridae
- Genus: Idaea
- Species: I. tristega

Binomial name
- Idaea tristega (Prout, 1932)

Synonyms
- Sterrha tristega Prout, 1932

Species of moth

Idaea tristega is a moth of the family Geometridae. It is found in northern Madagascar.

This species is very variable in size and warmth of the ground-colour. It is tinged reddish to cinnamon-brown with a wingspan of 14-22mm.
