= Idaea mutanda =

Scientific classification
- Domain: Eukaryota
- Kingdom: Animalia
- Phylum: Arthropoda
- Class: Insecta
- Order: Lepidoptera
- Family: Geometridae
- Genus: Idaea
- Species: I. mutanda

Binomial name
- Idaea mutanda Warren, 1888

Species of moth

Idaea mutanda is a moth of the family Geometridae first described by Warren in 1888. It is found in Sri Lanka.
