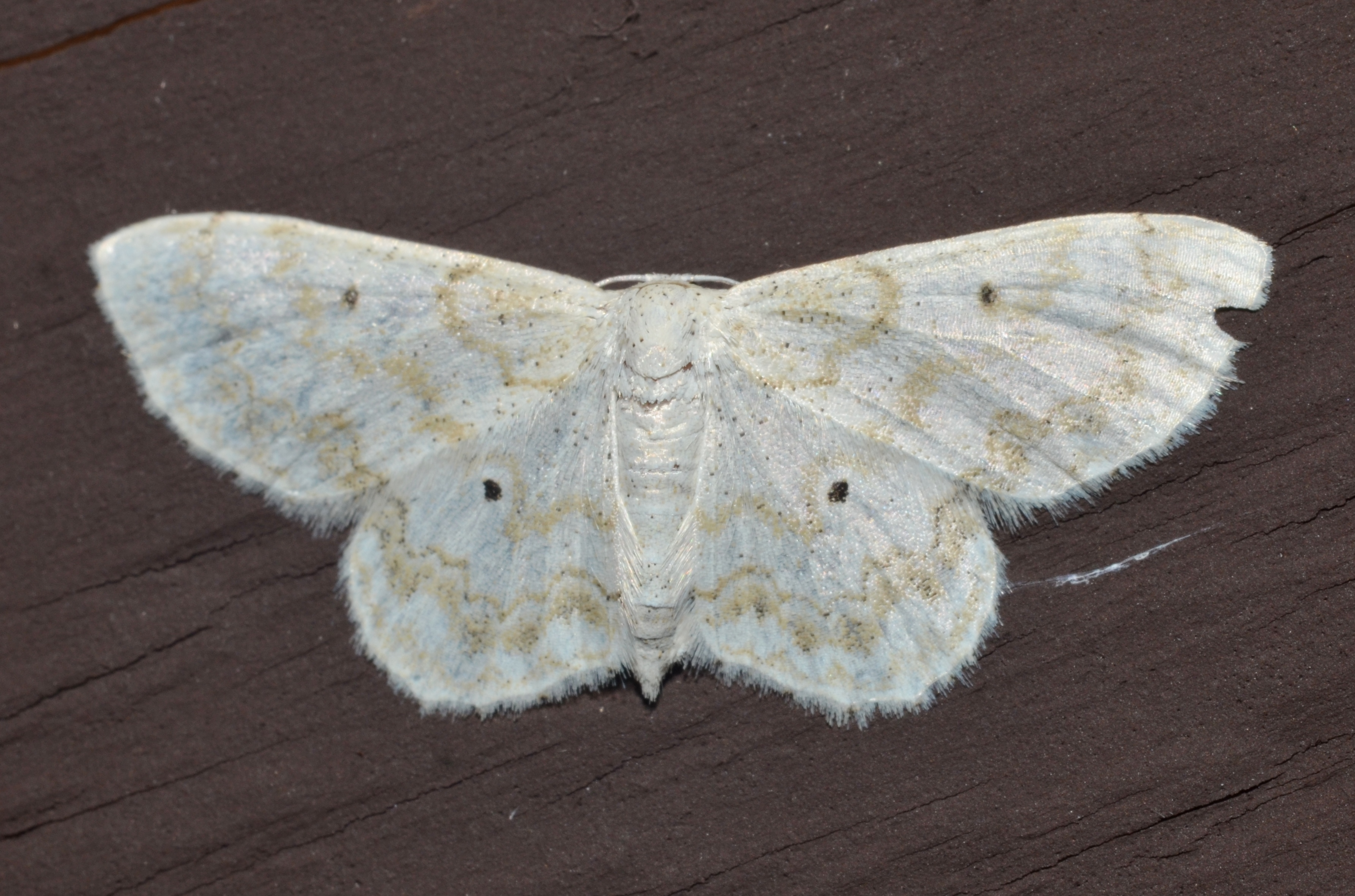

Scientific classification
- Kingdom: Animalia
- Phylum: Arthropoda
- Clade: Pancrustacea
- Class: Insecta
- Order: Lepidoptera
- Family: Geometridae
- Genus: Idaea
- Species: I. obfusaria

Binomial name
- Idaea obfusaria (Walker, 1861)

Synonyms
- Acidalia punctofimbriata Packard, 1873

= Idaea obfusaria =

Species of moth

Idaea obfusaria, the rippled wave, is a species of geometrid moth in the family Geometridae.
