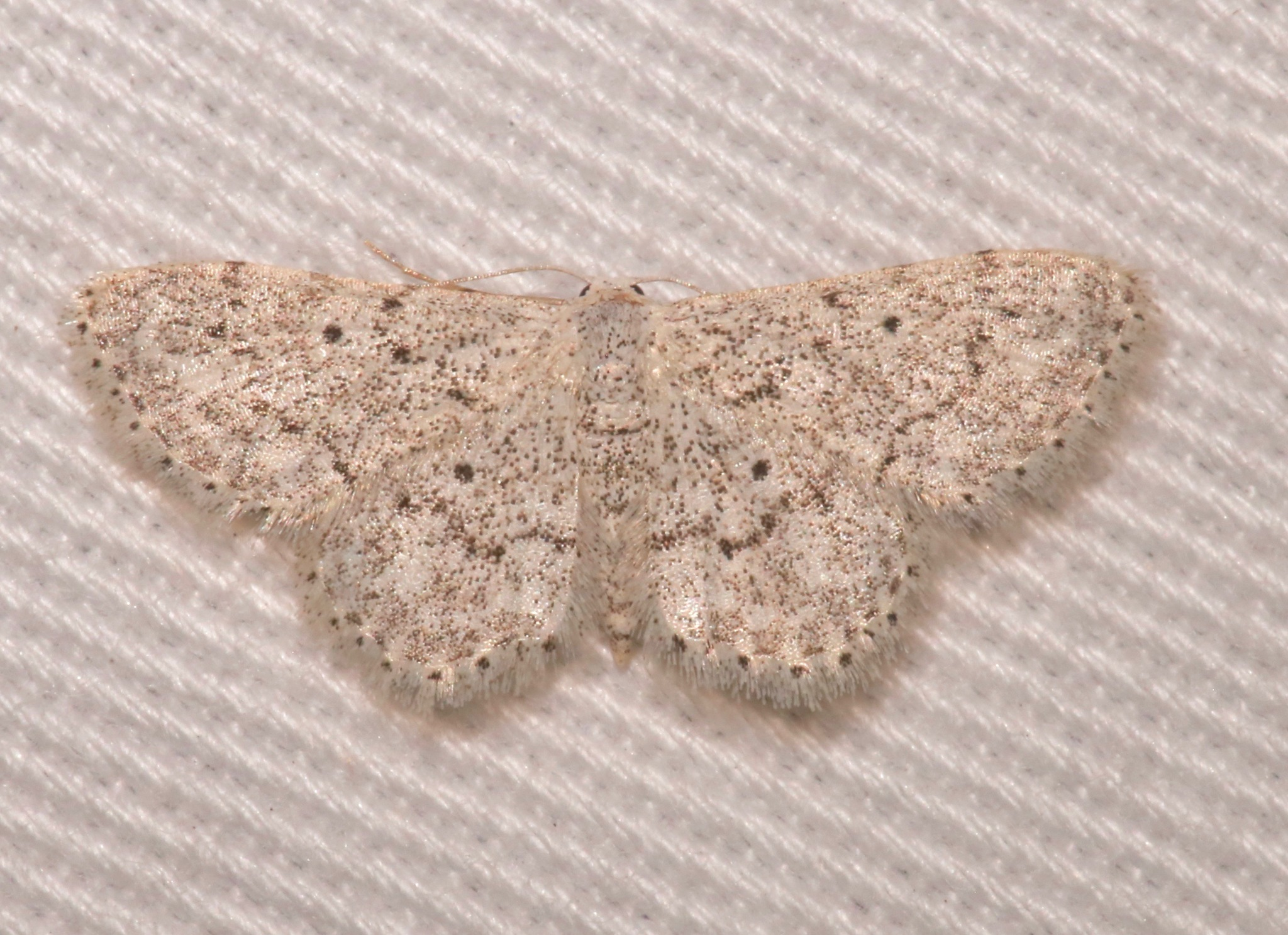

Scientific classification
- Kingdom: Animalia
- Phylum: Arthropoda
- Clade: Pancrustacea
- Class: Insecta
- Order: Lepidoptera
- Family: Geometridae
- Genus: Idaea
- Species: I. ostentaria

Binomial name
- Idaea ostentaria (Walker, 1861)

= Idaea ostentaria =

Species of moth

Idaea ostentaria, the showy wave, is a species of geometrid moth in the family Geometridae.
