= Idaea micropterata =

Scientific classification
- Kingdom: Animalia
- Phylum: Arthropoda
- Clade: Pancrustacea
- Class: Insecta
- Order: Lepidoptera
- Family: Geometridae
- Genus: Idaea
- Species: I. micropterata

Binomial name
- Idaea micropterata (Hulst, 1900)

Species of moth

Idaea micropterata is a species of geometrid moth in the family Geometridae. It is found in North America.

The MONA or Hodges number for Idaea micropterata is 7119.
