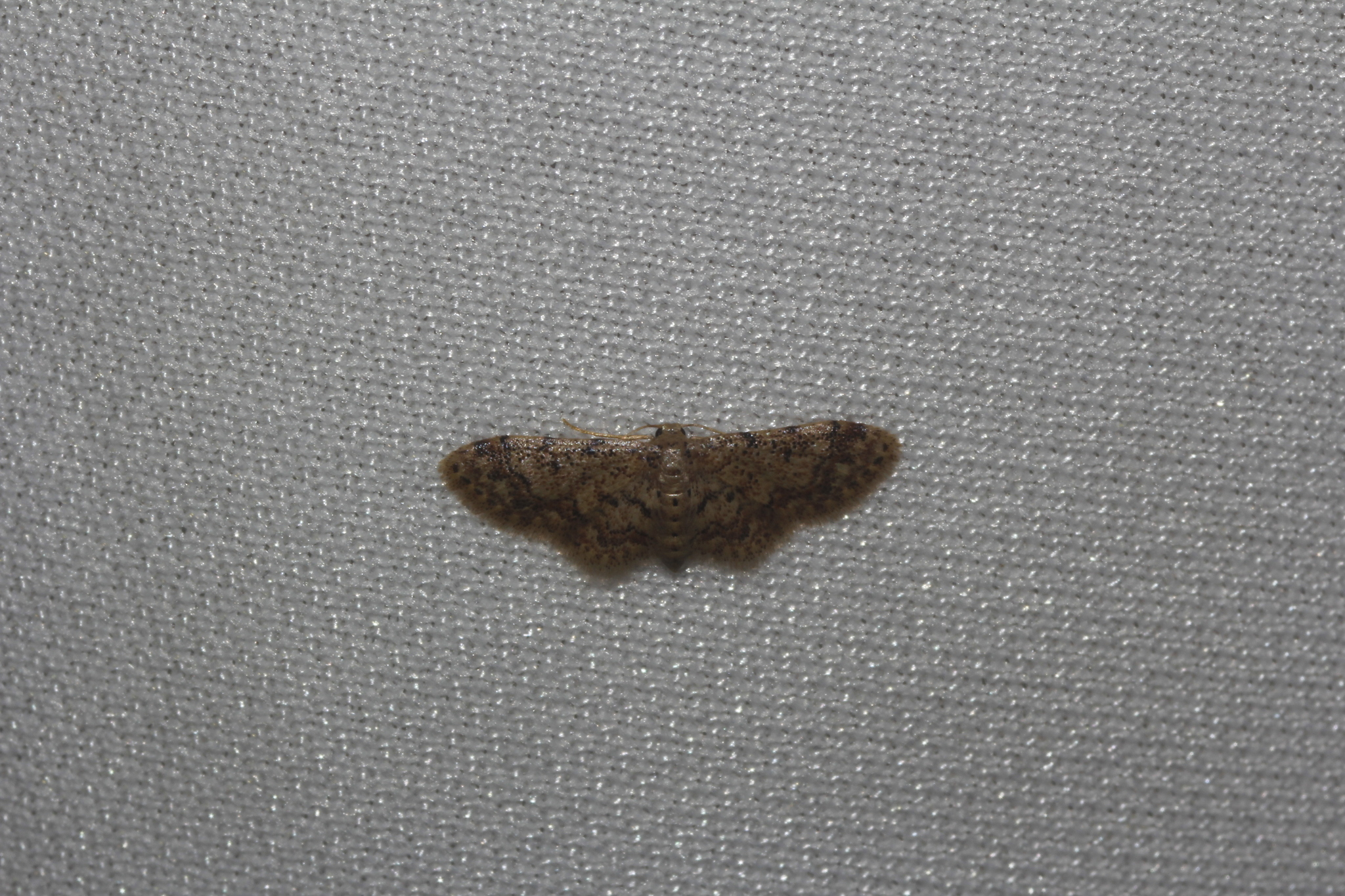

Scientific classification
- Kingdom: Animalia
- Phylum: Arthropoda
- Clade: Pancrustacea
- Class: Insecta
- Order: Lepidoptera
- Family: Geometridae
- Genus: Idaea
- Species: I. pervertipennis

Binomial name
- Idaea pervertipennis (Hulst, 1900)

= Idaea pervertipennis =

Species of moth

Idaea pervertipennis is a species of geometrid moth in the family Geometridae. It is found in North America.
