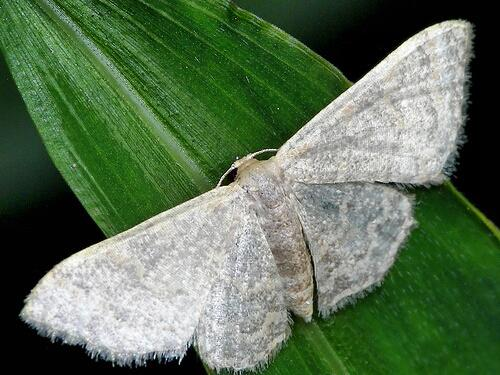

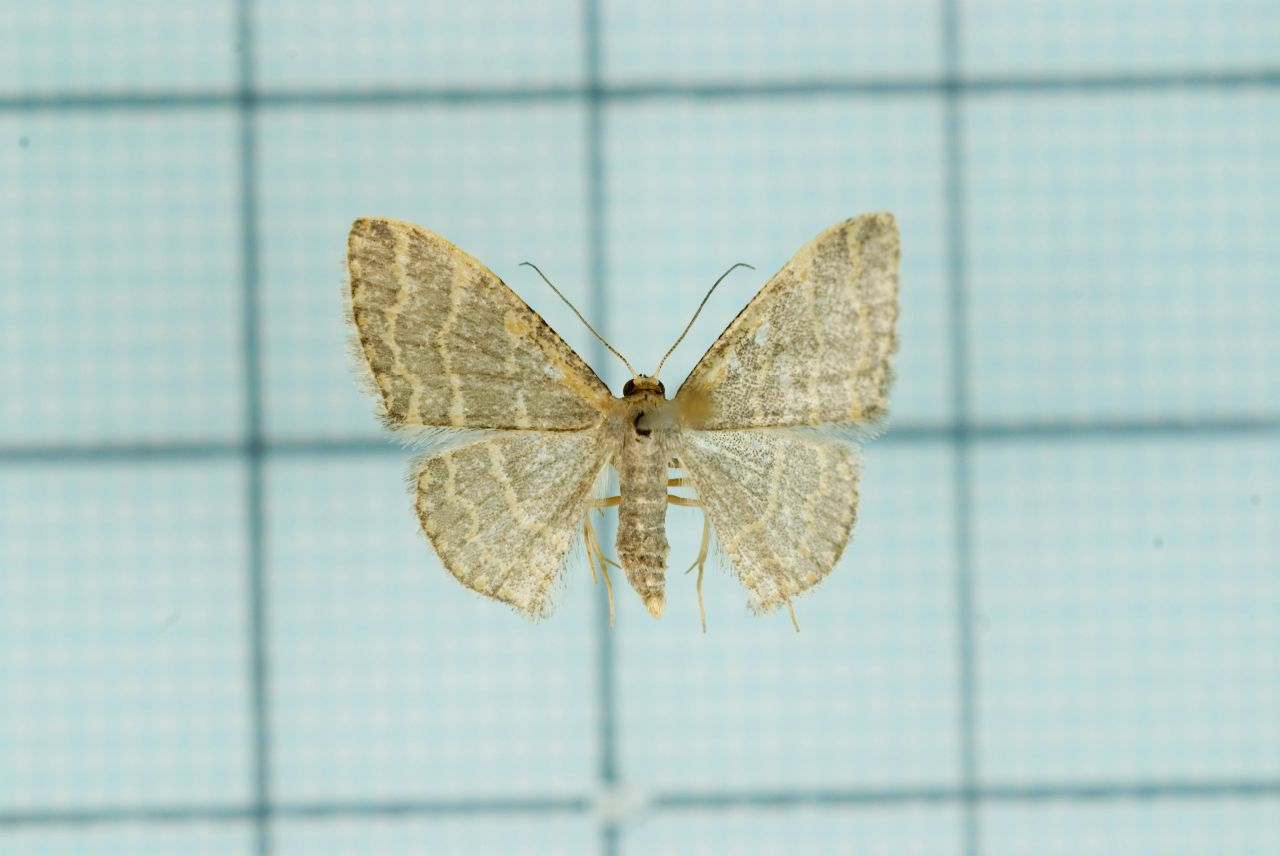

Scientific classification
- Kingdom: Animalia
- Phylum: Arthropoda
- Clade: Pancrustacea
- Class: Insecta
- Order: Lepidoptera
- Family: Geometridae
- Genus: Idaea
- Species: I. costiguttata

Binomial name
- Idaea costiguttata (Warren, 1896)

Synonyms
- Eois costiguttata Warren 1896

= Idaea costiguttata =

Species of moth

Idaea costiguttata is a moth of the family Geometridae. It is found in China and Taiwan.
