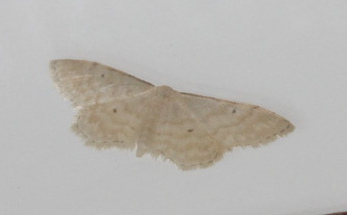

Scientific classification
- Kingdom: Animalia
- Phylum: Arthropoda
- Clade: Pancrustacea
- Class: Insecta
- Order: Lepidoptera
- Family: Geometridae
- Genus: Idaea
- Species: I. consanguiberica

Binomial name
- Idaea consanguiberica Rezbanyai-Reser & Exposito, 1992

= Idaea consanguiberica =

Species of moth

Idaea consanguiberica is a species of moth in the family Geometridae. It is found on the Iberian Peninsula.
