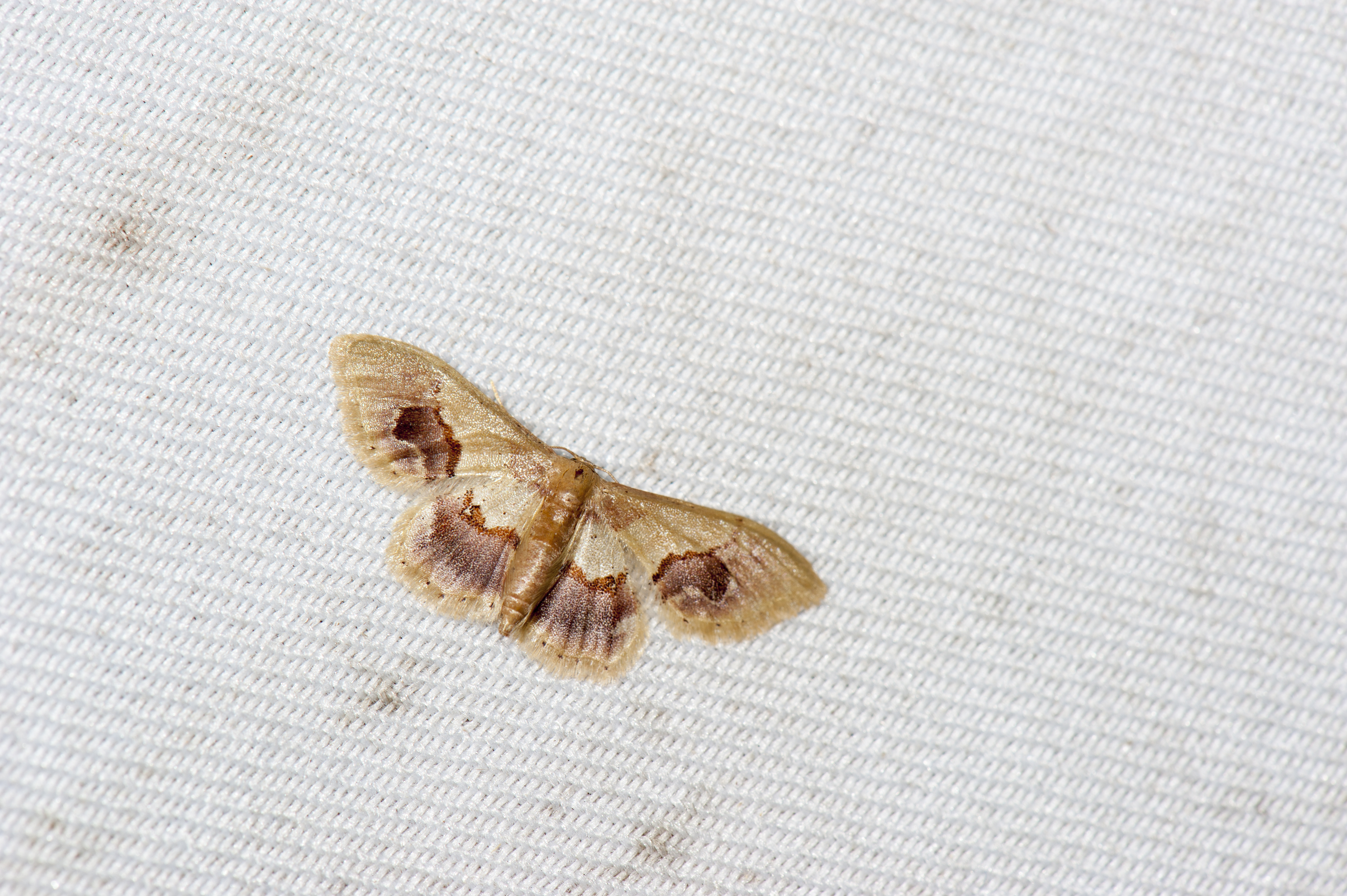

Scientific classification
- Kingdom: Animalia
- Phylum: Arthropoda
- Clade: Pancrustacea
- Class: Insecta
- Order: Lepidoptera
- Family: Geometridae
- Genus: Idaea
- Species: I. egenaria

Binomial name
- Idaea egenaria (Walker, 1861)

Synonyms
- Acidalia egenaria Walker, 1861

= Idaea egenaria =

Species of moth

Idaea egenaria is a species of geometrid moth. The species was first described by Francis Walker in 1861 as Acidalia egenaria. It is native to Southeast Asia.
