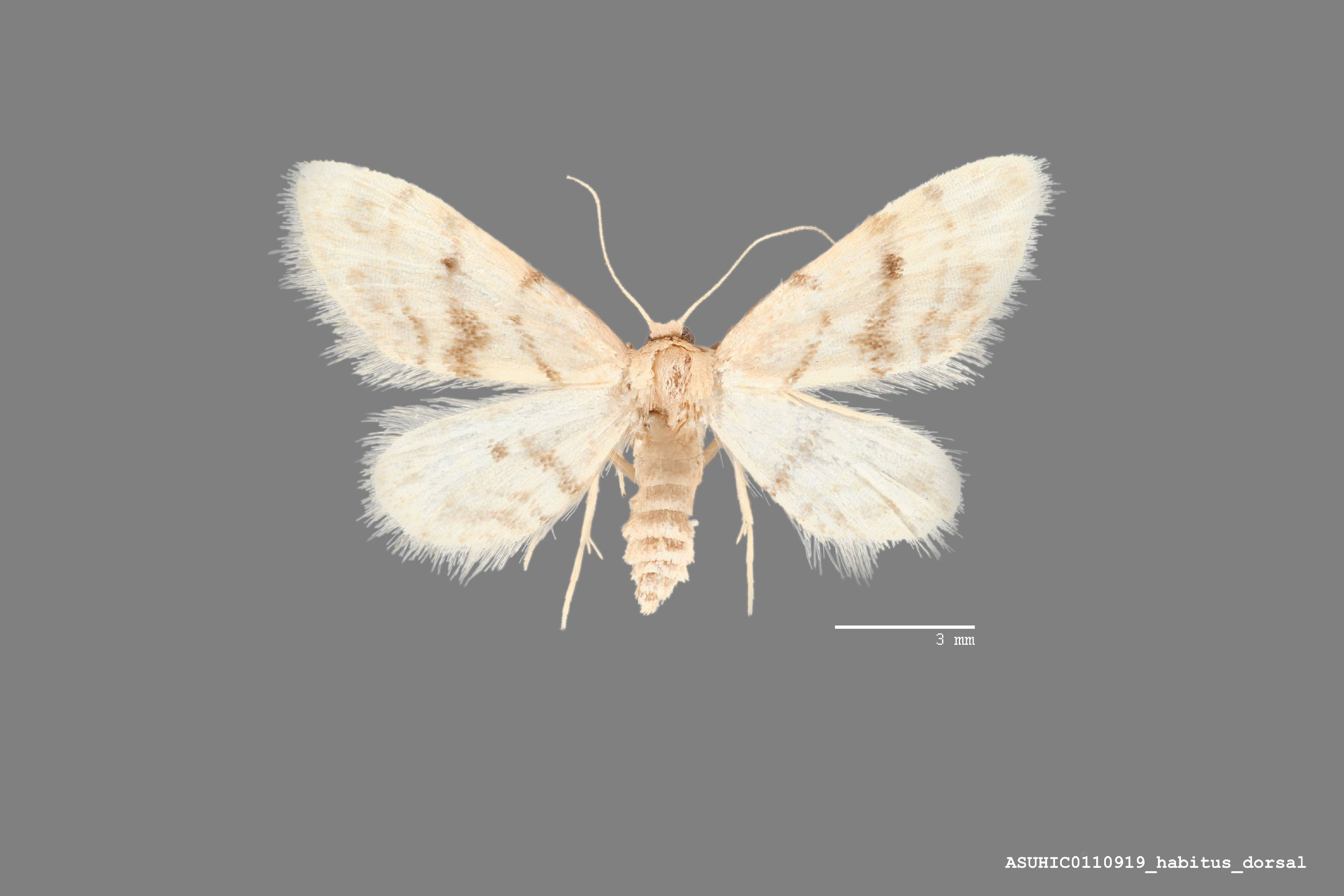

Scientific classification
- Kingdom: Animalia
- Phylum: Arthropoda
- Clade: Pancrustacea
- Class: Insecta
- Order: Lepidoptera
- Family: Geometridae
- Genus: Idaea
- Species: I. microphysa

Binomial name
- Idaea microphysa (Hulst, 1896)

= Idaea microphysa =

Species of moth

Idaea microphysa is a species of geometrid moth in the family Geometridae. It is found in North America.

The MONA or Hodges number for Idaea microphysa is 7104.
