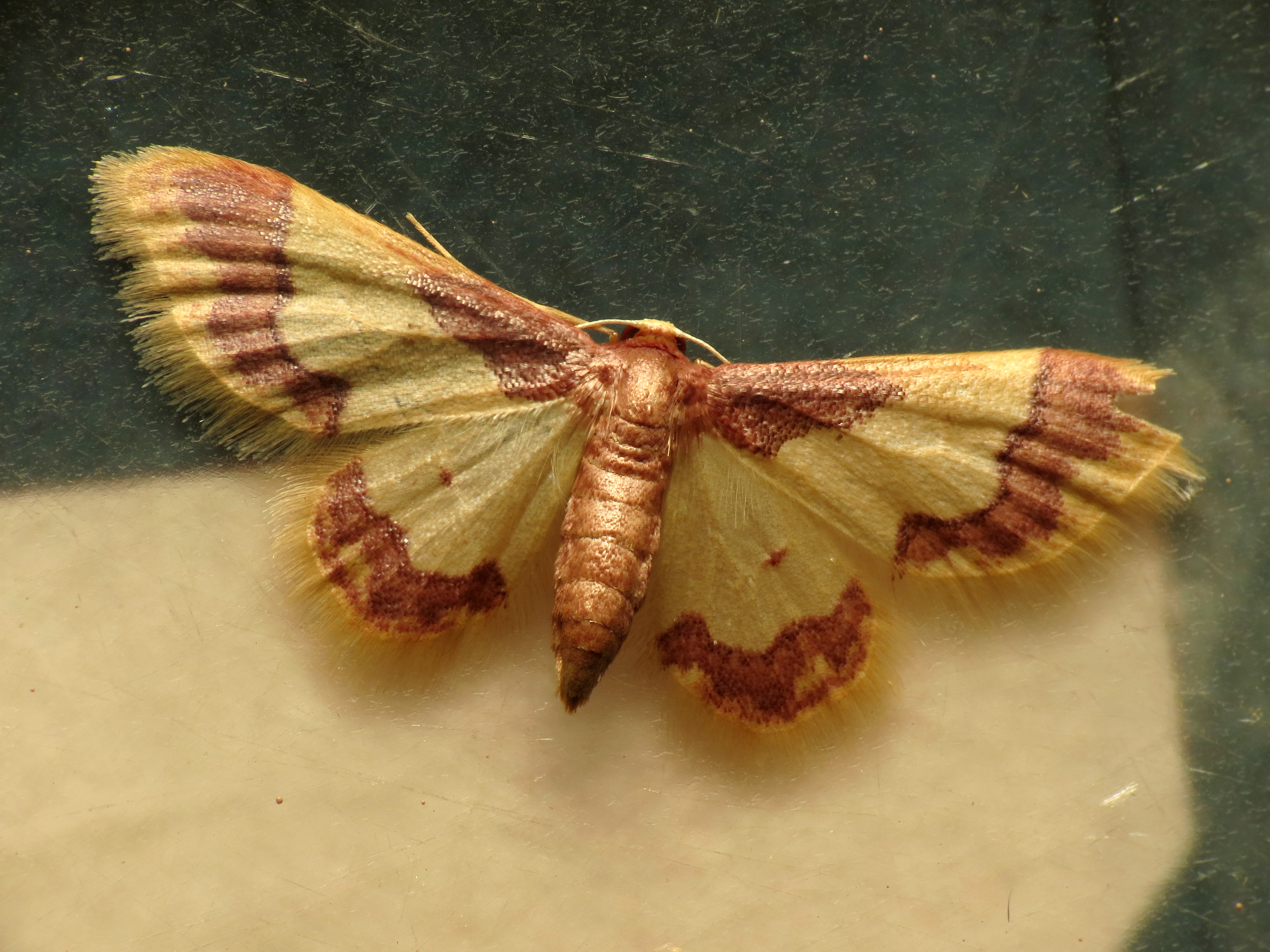

Scientific classification
- Kingdom: Animalia
- Phylum: Arthropoda
- Clade: Pancrustacea
- Class: Insecta
- Order: Lepidoptera
- Family: Geometridae
- Genus: Idaea
- Species: I. basinta

Binomial name
- Idaea basinta (Schaus, 1901)

= Idaea basinta =

Species of moth

Idaea basinta, the red-and-white wave, is a species of geometrid moth in the family Geometridae. It was described by William Schaus in 1901 and is found in Central and North America.

The MONA or Hodges number for Idaea basinta is 7110.
