= Scopula fernaria =

Scientific classification
- Domain: Eukaryota
- Kingdom: Animalia
- Phylum: Arthropoda
- Class: Insecta
- Order: Lepidoptera
- Family: Geometridae
- Genus: Scopula
- Species: S. fernaria

Binomial name
- Scopula fernaria Schaus, 1940

Synonyms
- Idaea fernaria (Schaus, 1940)

Species of geometer moth in subfamily Sterrhinae

Scopula fernaria is a moth of the family Geometridae. It was described by Schaus in 1940. It is endemic to Puerto Rico.
