= Idaea lycaugidia =

Scientific classification
- Kingdom: Animalia
- Phylum: Arthropoda
- Clade: Pancrustacea
- Class: Insecta
- Order: Lepidoptera
- Family: Geometridae
- Genus: Idaea
- Species: I. lycaugidia

Binomial name
- Idaea lycaugidia (L. B. Prout, 1932)

Synonyms
- Sterrha lycaugidia L. B. Prout, 1932

Species of moth

Idaea lycaugidia is a moth of the family Geometridae first described by Louis Beethoven Prout in 1932. It is found in northern Madagascar.

This species has a wingspan of 14–18 mm and looks similar to Idaea lilliputaria (Warren, 1902) in shape and general aspect.
