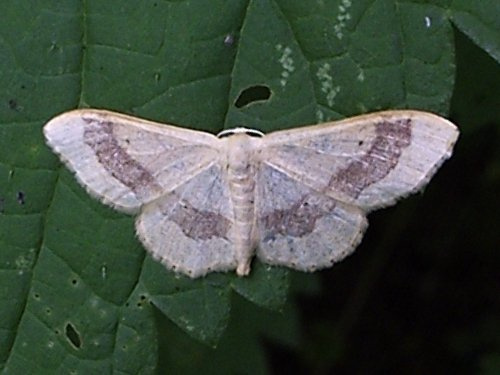
- Idaea aversata

Scientific classification
- Kingdom: Animalia
- Phylum: Arthropoda
- Clade: Pancrustacea
- Class: Insecta
- Order: Lepidoptera
- Family: Geometridae
- Subfamily: Sterrhinae
- Tribe: Sterrhini
- Genus: Idaea; Treitschke, 1825

Synonyms
- Andragrupos Hampson, 1891; Ania Stephens, 1831; Anteois Warren, 1900; Argyroscelia Warren, 1907; Aphrogeneia Gumppenberg, 1890; Brachyprota Warren, 1897; Cacorista Warren, 1899; Carphoxera Riley, 1891; Cysteophora Hulst, 1900; Deinopygia Warren, 1904; Euphenolia Grossbeck, 1907; Hemipogon Warren, 1897; Hirthestes Dognin, 1914; Hyriogona Warren, 1900; Janarda Moore, 1888; Limeria Staudinger, 1892; Leptacme Warren, 1897; Lobura Warren, 1906; Lophophleps Hampson, 1891; Lophosis Hulst, 1896; Mnesterodes Meyrick, 1889; Neochrysa Warren, 1900; Omopera Warren, 1906; Pareupithex Warren, 1907; Pogonogya Warren, 1900; Polygraphodes Warren, 1897; Prospasta Warren, 1900; Ptenopoda Hulst, 1896; Ptychopoda Curtis, 1826; Pyctis Hübner, 1825; Pythodora Meyrick, 1886; Schematorhages Warren, 1905; Sterrha Hübner, 1825; Strophoptila Warren, 1897; Synomila Hulst, 1896; Thysanotricha Warren, 1903; Xenocentris Meyrick, 1889; Zeuctoneura Warren, 1895

= Idaea (moth) =

Genus of moths

Idaea, sometimes called Hyriogona (among other synonyms), is a large genus of geometer moths. It was erected by Georg Friedrich Treitschke in 1825. They are found nearly worldwide, with many native to the Mediterranean, the African savannas, and the deserts of western Asia.

As of 2013, there were about 680 species in the genus.

== Selected species ==
- Idaea actiosaria (Walker, 1861)
- Idaea albitorquata (Püngeler, 1909)
- Idaea alicantaria (Reisser, 1963)
- Idaea alopecodes (Meyrick, 1888)
- Idaea alyssumata (Himminghoffen & Milliere, 1871)
- Idaea amnesta (Prout, 1922)
- Idaea antiquaria (Herrich-Schäffer, 1847)
- Idaea argophylla (Turner, 1922)
- Idaea ascepta (Prout, 1915)
- Idaea attenuaria (Rambur, 1833)
- Idaea atlantica (Stainton, 1859)
- Idaea aureolaria (Denis & Schiffermüller, 1775)
- Idaea auricruda (Butler, 1879)
- Idaea aversata (Linnaeus, 1758) – riband wave
- Idaea basinta (Schaus, 1901) – red and white wave
- Idaea belemiata (Millière, 1868)
- Idaea bigladiata Herbulot, 1975
- Idaea biselata (Hufnagel, 1767) – fan-footed wave
- Idaea blaesii Lenz & Hausmann, 1992
- Idaea bonifata (Hulst, 1887)
- Idaea bundeli Viidalepp, 1988
- Idaea bustilloi (Agenjo, 1967)
- Idaea calunetaria (Staudinger, 1859)
- Idaea camparia (Herrich-Schäffer, 1852)
- Idaea carvalhoi Herbulot, 1979
- Idaea celtima (Schaus, 1901)
- Idaea cervantaria (Millière, 1869)
- Idaea chloristis (Meyrick, 1888)
- Idaea circuitaria (Hübner, 1819)
- Idaea coercita (Lucas, 1900)
- Idaea consanguiberica Rezbanyai-Reser & Exposito, 1992
- Idaea consanguinaria (Lederer, 1853)
- Idaea consolidata (Lederer, 1853)
- Idaea contiguaria (Hübner, [1799]) – Weaver's wave
- Idaea costaria (Walker, 1863)
- Idaea costiguttata Warren, 1896
- Idaea couloniata (Balestre, 1907)
- Idaea crinipes (Warren, 1897)
- Idaea curtopedata Ebert, 1965
- Idaea darvasica Viidalepp, 1988
- Idaea dasypus (Turner, 1908)
- Idaea degeneraria (Hübner, [1799]) – Portland ribbon wave
- Idaea deitanaria Reisser & Weisert, 1977
- Idaea deleta (Wileman & South, 1917)
- Idaea delosticta (Turner, 1922)
- Idaea demissaria (Hübner, 1831) – red-bordered wave
- Idaea denudaria (Prout, 1913)
- Idaea descitaria (Christoph, 1893)
- Idaea determinata (Staudinger, 1876)
- Idaea deversaria (Herrich-Schäffer, 1847)
- Idaea dilutaria (Hübner, [1799]) – silky wave
- Idaea dimidiata (Hufnagel, 1767) – single dotted wave
- Idaea distinctaria (Boisduval, 1840)
- Idaea dohlmanni (Hedemann, 1881)
- Idaea dolichopis (Turner, 1908)
- Idaea effeminata (Staudinger, 1892)
- Idaea efflorata (Zeller, 1849)
- Idaea effusaria (Christoph, 1881)
- Idaea egenaria (Walker, 1861)
- Idaea elachista (Turner, 1922)
- Idaea elaphrodes (Turner, 1908)
- Idaea elongaria (Rambur, 1833)
- Idaea emarginata (Linnaeus, 1758) – small scallop
- Idaea epicyrta (Turner, 1917)
- Idaea eremiata (Hulst, 1887)
- Idaea eretmopus (Turner, 1908)
- Idaea euclasta (Turner, 1922)
- Idaea eucrossa (Turner, 1932)
- Idaea eugeniata (Millière, 1870)
- Idaea euphorbiata (Balestre, 1906)
- Idaea eupitheciata (Guenée, [1858])
- Idaea exilaria (Guenée, 1858)
- Idaea falckii (Hedemann, 1879)
- Idaea fatimata (Staudinger, 1895)
- Idaea fernaria (Schaus, 1940)
- Idaea ferrilinea (Warren, 1900)
- Idaea figuraria (A. Bang-Haas, 1907)
- Idaea filicata (Hübner, [1799])
- Idaea flaveolaria (Hübner, [1809])
- Idaea forsteri (Wiltshire, 1967)
- Idaea franconiaria (Swinhoe, 1902)
- Idaea fucosa (Warren, 1900)
- Idaea furciferata (Packard, 1873)
- Idaea fuscovenosa (Goeze, 1781) – dwarf cream wave
- Idaea geminata (Warren, 1895)
- Idaea gemmaria Hampson, 1896
- Idaea gemmata (Packard, 1876)
- Idaea halmaea (Meyrick, 1888)
- Idaea hilliata (Hulst, 1887)
- Idaea hispanaria (Püngeler, 1913)
- Idaea humiliata (Hufnagel, 1767) – Isle of Wight wave
- Idaea ibericata (Wehrli, 1927)
- Idaea ibizaria Mentzer, 1980
- Idaea imebcilla (Inoue, 1955)
- Idaea incalcarata (Chrétien, 1919)
- Idaea incisaria (Staudinger, 1892)
- Idaea indigata (Wileman, 1915)
- Idaea infirmaria (Rambur, 1833)
- Idaea inquinata (Scopoli, 1763) – rusty wave
- Idaea insulensis (Rindge, 1958)
- Idaea intermedia (Staudinger, 1879)
- Idaea invalida (Butler, 1879)
- Idaea inversata (Guenée, 1857)
- Idaea iodesma (Meyrick, 1897)
- Idaea jakima (Butler, 1878)
- Idaea joannisiata (Homberg, 1911)
- Idaea korbi (Püngeler, 1917)
- Idaea krasilnikovae Viidalepp, 1992
- Idaea laevigata (Scopoli, 1763) – strange wave
- Idaea leptochyta (Turner, 1942)
- Idaea libycata (Bartel, 1906)
- Idaea lilliputaria (Warren, 1902)
- Idaea lineata Hampson, 1893
- Idaea litigiosaria (Boisduval, 1840)
- Idaea longaria (Herrich-Schäffer, 1852)
- Idaea lucellata (Püngeler, 1892)
- Idaea lucida (Turner, [1942])
- Idaea lusohispanica Herbulot, 1991
- Idaea luteolaria (Constant, 1863)
- Idaea lutulentaria (Staudinger, 1892)
- Idaea lycaugidia (Prout, 1932)
- Idaea macilentaria (Herrich-Schäffer, 1848)
- Idaea mancipiata (Staudinger, 1871)
- Idaea manicaria (Herrich-Schäffer, 1851)
- Idaea marcidaria (Walker, 1861)
- Idaea mediaria (Hübner, 1819)
- Idaea methaemaria (Hampson, 1903)
- Idaea metohiensis (Rebel, 1900)
- Idaea micra Hampson, 1893
- Idaea microphysa (Hulst, 1896)
- Idaea micropterata (Hulst, 1900)
- Idaea miltophrica (Turner, 1922)
- Idaea minuscula (Ribbe, 1912)
- Idaea minuscularia (Ribbe, 1912)
- Idaea minuta (Schaus, 1901)
- Idaea miranda (Hulst, 1896)
- Idaea monata (Forbes, [1947])
- Idaea moniliata (Denis & Schiffermüller, 1775) – chequered wave
- Idaea muricata (Hufnagel, 1767) – purple-bordered gold
- Idaea muricolor (Warren, 1904)
- Idaea mustelata Gumppenberg, 1892
- Idaea mutanda Warren, 1888
- Idaea nanata (Warren, 1897)
- Idaea nephelota (Turner, 1908)
- Idaea nexata (Hübner, [1813])
- Idaea nibseata (Cassino, 1931)
- Idaea nielseni (Hedemann, 1879)
- Idaea nigrolineata (Chrétien, 1911)
- Idaea nitidata (Herrich-Schäffer, 1861)
- Idaea nocturna (Staudinger, 1892)
- Idaea nudaria (Christoph, 1881)
- Idaea obfusaria (Walker, 1861) – rippled wave
- Idaea obliquaria (Turati, 1913)
- Idaea obsoletaria (Rambur, 1833)
- Idaea occidentaria (Packard, 1874)
- Idaea ochrata (Scopoli, 1763) – bright wave
- Idaea orilochia (H. Druce, 1893)
- Idaea ossiculata (Lederer, 1871)
- Idaea ostentaria (Walker, 1861) – showy wave
- Idaea osthelderi (Wehrli, 1932)
- Idaea ostrinaria (Hübner, [1813])
- Idaea pachydetis (Meyrick, 1888)
- Idaea palaestinensis (Sterneck, 1933)
- Idaea pallidata (Denis & Schiffermüller, 1775)
- Idaea paraula (Prout, 1914)
- Idaea partita (Lucas, 1900)
- Idaea pecharia Staudinger, 1863
- Idaea pervertipennis (Hulst, 1900)
- Idaea philocosma (Meyrick, 1888)
- Idaea phoenicoglauca Hampson, 1907
- Idaea phoenicoptera (Hampson, 1896)
- Idaea pilosata (Warren, 1898)
- Idaea poecilocrossa (Prout, 1932)
- Idaea politaria (Hübner, [1799])
- Idaea politata (Hübner, 1793)
- Idaea predotaria (Hartig, 1951)
- Idaea probleta (Turner, 1908)
- Idaea productata (Packard, 1876)
- Idaea promiscuaria (Leech, 1897)
- Idaea pseliota (Meyrick, 1888)
- Idaea pulveraria (Snellen, 1872)
- Idaea punctatissima (Warren, 1901)
- Idaea purpurea Hampson, 1891
- Idaea rainerii Hausmann, 1994
- Idaea remissa (Wileman, 1911)
- Idaea retractaria (Walker, 1861)
- Idaea rhodogrammaria (Püngeler, 1913)
- Idaea rhopalopus (Turner, 1908)
- Idaea robiginata (Staudinger, 1863)
- Idaea roseofasciata (Christoph, 1882)
- Idaea rotundopennata (Packard, 1876)
- Idaea rubraria (Staudinger, 1901)
- Idaea rufaria (Hübner, [1799])
- Idaea rupicolaria (Reisser, 1927)
- Idaea rusticata (Denis & Schiffermüller, 1775) – least carpet moth
- Idaea sakuraii (Inoue, 1963)
- Idaea saleri Domínguez & Baixeras, 1992
- Idaea salutaria (Christoph, 1881)
- Idaea sardoniata (Homberg, 1912)
- Idaea scaura (Turner, 1922)
- Idaea scintillans (Warren, 1898)
- Idaea scintillularia (Hulst, 1888) – diminutive moth
- Idaea semisericea (Warren, 1897)
- Idaea seriata (Schrank, 1802) – small dusty wave
- Idaea sericeata (Hübner, [1813])
- Idaea serpentata (Hufnagel, 1767) – ochraceous wave
- Idaea simplex (Warren, 1899)
- Idaea sinicata (Walker, 1861)
- Idaea skinnerata (Grossbeck, 1907)
- Idaea spissilimbaria (Mabille, 1888)
- Idaea squalidaria (Staudinger, 1882)
- Idaea stenozona (Lower, 1902)
- Idaea straminata (Borkhausen, 1794) – plain wave
- Idaea subochraria (Staudinger, 1892)
- Idaea subpolitana Mironov, 1986
- Idaea subrufaria (Staudinger, 1900)
- Idaea subsaturata (Guenée, 1858)
- Idaea subsericeata (Haworth, 1809) – satin wave
- Idaea sugillata (Bastelberger, 1911)
- Idaea sylvestraria (Hübner, [1799]) – dotted-bordered wave
- Idaea sympractor (Prout, 1932)
- Idaea tacturata (Walker, 1861) – dot-lined wave
- Idaea taiwana (Wileman & South, 1917)
- Idaea talvei Viidalepp, 1988
- Idaea terpnaria (Prout, 1913)
- Idaea textaria (Lederer, 1861)
- Idaea tineata (Thierry-Mieg, 1910)
- Idaea trigeminata (Haworth, 1809) – treble brown spot
- Idaea trisetata (Prout, 1922)
- Idaea trissomita (Turner, 1941)
- Idaea trissorma (Turner, 1926)
- Idaea tristega (Prout, 1932)
- Idaea tristriata (Staudinger, 1892)
- Idaea trypheropa (Meyrick, 1889)
- Idaea typicata (Guenée, 1858)
- Idaea uniformis (Warren, 1896)
- Idaea urcitana (Agenjo, 1952)
- Idaea vesubiata (Millière, 1873)
- Idaea violacearia (Walker, 1861)
- Idaea wiltshirei (Brandt, 1938)
- Idaea zoferata Kaila & Viidalepp, 1996
- Idaea zonata (Prout, 1932)
