= List of Lepidoptera of Andorra =

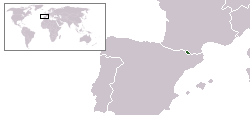
Location of Andorra

Lepidoptera of Andorra consist of both the butterflies and moths recorded from Andorra.

According to a recent estimate, there are a total of 885 Lepidoptera species present in Andorra.

== Butterflies ==
=== Hesperiidae ===
- Carcharodus alceae (Esper, 1780)
- Carcharodus floccifera (Zeller, 1847)
- Erynnis tages (Linnaeus, 1758)
- Hesperia comma (Linnaeus, 1758)
- Pyrgus alveus (Hübner, 1803)
- Pyrgus cacaliae (Rambur, 1839)
- Pyrgus cirsii (Rambur, 1839)
- Pyrgus malvae (Linnaeus, 1758)
- Pyrgus serratulae (Rambur, 1839)
- Thymelicus acteon (Rottemburg, 1775)
- Thymelicus lineola (Ochsenheimer, 1808)
- Thymelicus sylvestris (Poda, 1761)

=== Lycaenidae ===
- Aricia agestis (Denis & Schiffermuller, 1775)
- Aricia cramera Eschscholtz, 1821
- Aricia nicias (Meigen, 1830)
- Callophrys rubi (Linnaeus, 1758)
- Cupido minimus (Fuessly, 1775)
- Laeosopis roboris (Esper, 1789)
- Lampides boeticus (Linnaeus, 1767)
- Leptotes pirithous (Linnaeus, 1767)
- Lycaena alciphron (Rottemburg, 1775)
- Lycaena hippothoe (Linnaeus, 1761)
- Lycaena phlaeas (Linnaeus, 1761)
- Lycaena tityrus (Poda, 1761)
- Lycaena virgaureae (Linnaeus, 1758)
- Lysandra bellargus (Rottemburg, 1775)
- Lysandra coridon (Poda, 1761)
- Lysandra hispana (Herrich-Schäffer, 1852)
- Phengaris arion (Linnaeus, 1758)
- Plebejus argus (Linnaeus, 1758)
- Plebejus idas (Linnaeus, 1761)
- Polyommatus damon (Denis & Schiffermuller, 1775)
- Polyommatus daphnis (Denis & Schiffermuller, 1775)
- Polyommatus amandus (Schneider, 1792)
- Polyommatus dorylas (Denis & Schiffermuller, 1775)
- Polyommatus eros (Ochsenheimer, 1808)
- Polyommatus escheri (Hübner, 1823)
- Polyommatus icarus (Rottemburg, 1775)
- Satyrium spini (Denis & Schiffermuller, 1775)

=== Nymphalidae ===
- Aglais io (Linnaeus, 1758)
- Aglais urticae (Linnaeus, 1758)
- Arethusana arethusa (Denis & Schiffermuller, 1775)
- Argynnis paphia (Linnaeus, 1758)
- Argynnis pandora (Denis & Schiffermuller, 1775)
- Boloria eunomia (Esper, 1759)
- Boloria napaea (Hoffmannsegg, 1804)
- Boloria pales (Denis & Schiffermuller, 1775)
- Boloria selene (Denis & Schiffermuller, 1775)
- Brenthis daphne (Bergstrasser, 1780)
- Brenthis ino (Rottemburg, 1775)
- Brintesia circe (Fabricius, 1775)
- Coenonympha arcania (Linnaeus, 1761)
- Coenonympha dorus (Esper, 1782)
- Erebia cassioides (Reiner & Hochenwarth, 1792)
- Erebia epiphron (Knoch, 1783)
- Erebia euryale (Esper, 1805)
- Erebia gorgone Boisduval, 1833
- Erebia hispania Butler, 1868
- Erebia manto (Denis & Schiffermuller, 1775)
- Erebia meolans (Prunner, 1798)
- Erebia oeme (Hübner, 1804)
- Erebia pandrose (Borkhausen, 1788)
- Erebia rondoui Oberthur, 1908
- Erebia triarius (de Prunner, 1798)
- Fabriciana adippe (Denis & Schiffermuller, 1775)
- Hipparchia fagi (Scopoli, 1763)
- Hipparchia hermione (Linnaeus, 1764)
- Hipparchia semele (Linnaeus, 1758)
- Issoria lathonia (Linnaeus, 1758)
- Lasiommata maera (Linnaeus, 1758)
- Lasiommata megera (Linnaeus, 1767)
- Limenitis camilla (Linnaeus, 1764)
- Limenitis reducta Staudinger, 1901
- Maniola jurtina (Linnaeus, 1758)
- Melanargia lachesis (Hübner, 1790)
- Melitaea athalia (Rottemburg, 1775)
- Melitaea cinxia (Linnaeus, 1758)
- Melitaea deione (Geyer, 1832)
- Melitaea didyma (Esper, 1778)
- Melitaea parthenoides Keferstein, 1851
- Melitaea phoebe (Denis & Schiffermuller, 1775)
- Melitaea trivia (Denis & Schiffermuller, 1775)
- Nymphalis antiopa (Linnaeus, 1758)
- Polygonia c-album (Linnaeus, 1758)
- Pyronia bathseba (Fabricius, 1793)
- Pyronia tithonus (Linnaeus, 1767)
- Satyrus actaea (Esper, 1781)
- Speyeria aglaja (Linnaeus, 1758)
- Vanessa atalanta (Linnaeus, 1758)
- Vanessa cardui (Linnaeus, 1758)

=== Papilionidae ===
- Iphiclides podalirius (Linnaeus, 1758)
- Papilio machaon Linnaeus, 1758
- Parnassius apollo (Linnaeus, 1758)
- Parnassius mnemosyne (Linnaeus, 1758)

=== Pieridae ===
- Anthocharis cardamines (Linnaeus, 1758)
- Anthocharis euphenoides Staudinger, 1869
- Aporia crataegi (Linnaeus, 1758)
- Colias croceus (Fourcroy, 1785)
- Colias phicomone (Esper, 1780)
- Gonepteryx rhamni (Linnaeus, 1758)
- Leptidea sinapis (Linnaeus, 1758)
- Pieris brassicae (Linnaeus, 1758)
- Pieris mannii (Mayer, 1851)
- Pieris napi (Linnaeus, 1758)
- Pieris rapae (Linnaeus, 1758)
- Pontia callidice (Hübner, 1800)

== Moths ==
=== Coleophoridae ===
- Coleophora adelogrammella Zeller, 1849
- Coleophora graminicolella Heinemann, 1876
- Coleophora mayrella (Hübner, 1813)
- Coleophora ribasella Baldizzone, 1982
- Coleophora trifolii (Curtis, 1832)

=== Cosmopterigidae ===
- Pancalia leuwenhoekella (Linnaeus, 1761)
- Vulcaniella grabowiella (Staudinger, 1859)

=== Cossidae ===
- Acossus terebra (Denis & Schiffermuller, 1775)
- Cossus cossus (Linnaeus, 1758)
- Dyspessa ulula (Borkhausen, 1790)
- Zeuzera pyrina (Linnaeus, 1761)

=== Crambidae ===
- Angustalius malacellus (Duponchel, 1836)
- Catoptria digitellus (Herrich-Schäffer, 1849)
- Catoptria falsella (Denis & Schiffermuller, 1775)
- Crambus lathoniellus (Zincken, 1817)

=== Drepanidae ===
- Achlya flavicornis (Linnaeus, 1758)
- Cilix glaucata (Scopoli, 1763)
- Cymatophorina diluta (Denis & Schiffermuller, 1775)
- Falcaria lacertinaria (Linnaeus, 1758)
- Ochropacha duplaris (Linnaeus, 1761)
- Polyploca ridens (Fabricius, 1787)
- Tethea ocularis (Linnaeus, 1767)
- Thyatira batis (Linnaeus, 1758)
- Watsonalla uncinula (Borkhausen, 1790)

=== Elachistidae ===
- Elachista andorraensis Traugott-Olsen, 1988
- Haplochrois buvati (Baldizzone, 1985)
- Heinemannia festivella (Denis & Schiffermuller, 1775)

=== Endromidae ===
- Endromis versicolora (Linnaeus, 1758)

=== Erebidae ===
- Apaidia mesogona (Godart, 1824)
- Arctia caja (Linnaeus, 1758)
- Arctia villica (Linnaeus, 1758)
- Atlantarctia tigrina (Villers, 1789)
- Autophila dilucida (Hübner, 1808)
- Autophila cataphanes (Hübner, 1813)
- Callimorpha dominula (Linnaeus, 1758)
- Calliteara pudibunda (Linnaeus, 1758)
- Calyptra thalictri (Borkhausen, 1790)
- Catephia alchymista (Denis & Schiffermuller, 1775)
- Catocala coniuncta (Esper, 1787)
- Catocala conversa (Esper, 1783)
- Catocala elocata (Esper, 1787)
- Catocala fraxini (Linnaeus, 1758)
- Catocala nupta (Linnaeus, 1767)
- Catocala nymphaea (Esper, 1787)
- Catocala nymphagoga (Esper, 1787)
- Catocala optata (Godart, 1824)
- Catocala promissa (Denis & Schiffermuller, 1775)
- Catocala puerpera (Giorna, 1791)
- Chelis maculosa (Gerning, 1780)
- Coscinia cribraria (Linnaeus, 1758)
- Diacrisia sannio (Linnaeus, 1758)
- Diaphora mendica (Clerck, 1759)
- Dicallomera fascelina (Linnaeus, 1758)
- Dysauxes punctata (Fabricius, 1781)
- Dysgonia algira (Linnaeus, 1767)
- Eilema griseola (Hübner, 1803)
- Eilema lurideola (Zincken, 1817)
- Eilema lutarella (Linnaeus, 1758)
- Eilema palliatella (Scopoli, 1763)
- Eilema pseudocomplana (Daniel, 1939)
- Eilema pygmaeola (Doubleday, 1847)
- Eilema sororcula (Hufnagel, 1766)
- Eilema uniola (Rambur, 1866)
- Eublemma candidana (Fabricius, 1794)
- Eublemma ostrina (Hübner, 1808)
- Eublemma parva (Hübner, 1808)
- Eublemma polygramma (Duponchel, 1842)
- Euclidia mi (Clerck, 1759)
- Euclidia glyphica (Linnaeus, 1758)
- Euplagia quadripunctaria (Poda, 1761)
- Euproctis chrysorrhoea (Linnaeus, 1758)
- Herminia tarsipennalis (Treitschke, 1835)
- Hypena obesalis Treitschke, 1829
- Hypena proboscidalis (Linnaeus, 1758)
- Hyphoraia testudinaria (Geoffroy in Fourcroy, 1785)
- Laspeyria flexula (Denis & Schiffermuller, 1775)
- Leucoma salicis (Linnaeus, 1758)
- Lithosia quadra (Linnaeus, 1758)
- Lygephila craccae (Denis & Schiffermuller, 1775)
- Lygephila pastinum (Treitschke, 1826)
- Lymantria dispar (Linnaeus, 1758)
- Lymantria monacha (Linnaeus, 1758)
- Miltochrista miniata (Forster, 1771)
- Minucia lunaris (Denis & Schiffermuller, 1775)
- Ocneria rubea (Denis & Schiffermuller, 1775)
- Ocnogyna zoraida (Graslin, 1837)
- Paidia rica (Freyer, 1858)
- Paracolax tristalis (Fabricius, 1794)
- Parasemia plantaginis (Linnaeus, 1758)
- Phragmatobia fuliginosa (Linnaeus, 1758)
- Phragmatobia luctifera (Denis & Schiffermuller, 1775)
- Phytometra viridaria (Clerck, 1759)
- Rhyparia purpurata (Linnaeus, 1758)
- Scoliopteryx libatrix (Linnaeus, 1758)
- Setina flavicans (Geyer, 1836)
- Setina irrorella (Linnaeus, 1758)
- Spilosoma lubricipeda (Linnaeus, 1758)
- Spilosoma lutea (Hufnagel, 1766)
- Watsonarctia deserta (Bartel, 1902)
- Zanclognatha lunalis (Scopoli, 1763)

=== Gelechiidae ===
- Acompsia antirrhinella Milliere, 1866
- Acompsia cinerella (Clerck, 1759)
- Acompsia pyrenaella Huemer & Karsholt, 2002
- Acompsia schmidtiellus (Heyden, 1848)
- Bryotropha senectella (Zeller, 1839)
- Bryotropha similis (Stainton, 1854)
- Bryotropha terrella (Denis & Schiffermuller, 1775)
- Carpatolechia fugitivella (Zeller, 1839)
- Caryocolum albifaciella (Heinemann, 1870)
- Caryocolum leucomelanella (Zeller, 1839)
- Caryocolum mazeli Huemer & Nel, 2005
- Dactylotula kinkerella (Snellen, 1876)
- Exoteleia dodecella (Linnaeus, 1758)
- Gelechia sororculella (Hübner, 1817)
- Megacraspedus imparellus (Fischer von Röslerstamm, 1843)
- Metzneria lappella (Linnaeus, 1758)
- Recurvaria leucatella (Clerck, 1759)
- Sattleria pyrenaica (Petry, 1904)
- Scrobipalpa acuminatella (Sircom, 1850)
- Scrobipalpa artemisiella (Treitschke, 1833)
- Teleiopsis diffinis (Haworth, 1828)

=== Geometridae ===
- Acasis viretata (Hübner, 1799)
- Adactylotis gesticularia (Hübner, 1817)
- Adalbertia castiliaria (Staudinger, 1900)
- Aethalura punctulata (Denis & Schiffermuller, 1775)
- Agriopis aurantiaria (Hübner, 1799)
- Agriopis bajaria (Denis & Schiffermuller, 1775)
- Agriopis leucophaearia (Denis & Schiffermuller, 1775)
- Agriopis marginaria (Fabricius, 1776)
- Alcis repandata (Linnaeus, 1758)
- Aleucis distinctata (Herrich-Schäffer, 1839)
- Alsophila aescularia (Denis & Schiffermuller, 1775)
- Anticlea derivata (Denis & Schiffermuller, 1775)
- Aplocera efformata (Guenee, 1858)
- Aplocera plagiata (Linnaeus, 1758)
- Aplocera praeformata (Hübner, 1826)
- Apocheima hispidaria (Denis & Schiffermuller, 1775)
- Aspitates gilvaria (Denis & Schiffermuller, 1775)
- Asthena albulata (Hufnagel, 1767)
- Biston betularia (Linnaeus, 1758)
- Biston strataria (Hufnagel, 1767)
- Bupalus piniaria (Linnaeus, 1758)
- Cabera exanthemata (Scopoli, 1763)
- Cabera pusaria (Linnaeus, 1758)
- Calamodes occitanaria (Duponchel, 1829)
- Campaea margaritaria (Linnaeus, 1761)
- Camptogramma bilineata (Linnaeus, 1758)
- Cataclysme uniformata (Bellier, 1862)
- Catarhoe cuculata (Hufnagel, 1767)
- Catarhoe rubidata (Denis & Schiffermuller, 1775)
- Charissa obscurata (Denis & Schiffermuller, 1775)
- Charissa crenulata (Staudinger, 1871)
- Charissa mucidaria (Hübner, 1799)
- Charissa ambiguata (Duponchel, 1830)
- Charissa glaucinaria (Hübner, 1799)
- Chemerina caliginearia (Rambur, 1833)
- Chesias legatella (Denis & Schiffermuller, 1775)
- Chesias rufata (Fabricius, 1775)
- Chiasmia clathrata (Linnaeus, 1758)
- Chlorissa cloraria (Hübner, 1813)
- Chlorissa viridata (Linnaeus, 1758)
- Chloroclysta miata (Linnaeus, 1758)
- Chloroclysta siterata (Hufnagel, 1767)
- Chloroclystis v-ata (Haworth, 1809)
- Cidaria fulvata (Forster, 1771)
- Cleora cinctaria (Denis & Schiffermuller, 1775)
- Coenotephria tophaceata (Denis & Schiffermuller, 1775)
- Colostygia aptata (Hübner, 1813)
- Colostygia multistrigaria (Haworth, 1809)
- Colostygia olivata (Denis & Schiffermuller, 1775)
- Colostygia pectinataria (Knoch, 1781)
- Colostygia turbata (Hübner, 1799)
- Colotois pennaria (Linnaeus, 1761)
- Comibaena bajularia (Denis & Schiffermuller, 1775)
- Compsoptera opacaria (Hübner, 1819)
- Cosmorhoe ocellata (Linnaeus, 1758)
- Crocallis elinguaria (Linnaeus, 1758)
- Crocallis tusciaria (Borkhausen, 1793)
- Crocota peletieraria (Duponchel, 1830)
- Cyclophora hyponoea (Prout, 1935)
- Cyclophora suppunctaria (Zeller, 1847)
- Cyclophora albiocellaria (Hübner, 1789)
- Cyclophora albipunctata (Hufnagel, 1767)
- Cyclophora puppillaria (Hübner, 1799)
- Cyclophora quercimontaria (Bastelberger, 1897)
- Dyscia lentiscaria (Donzel, 1837)
- Dysstroma citrata (Linnaeus, 1761)
- Dysstroma truncata (Hufnagel, 1767)
- Earophila badiata (Denis & Schiffermuller, 1775)
- Ecleora solieraria (Rambur, 1834)
- Ecliptopera silaceata (Denis & Schiffermuller, 1775)
- Electrophaes corylata (Thunberg, 1792)
- Elophos dognini (Thierry-Mieg, 1910)
- Ematurga atomaria (Linnaeus, 1758)
- Ennomos alniaria (Linnaeus, 1758)
- Ennomos fuscantaria (Haworth, 1809)
- Ennomos quercaria (Hübner, 1813)
- Entephria caeruleata (Guenee, 1858)
- Entephria flavicinctata (Hübner, 1813)
- Epione repandaria (Hufnagel, 1767)
- Epione vespertaria (Linnaeus, 1767)
- Epirrhoe alternata (Muller, 1764)
- Epirrhoe galiata (Denis & Schiffermuller, 1775)
- Epirrhoe molluginata (Hübner, 1813)
- Epirrhoe rivata (Hübner, 1813)
- Epirrhoe tristata (Linnaeus, 1758)
- Epirrita autumnata (Borkhausen, 1794)
- Epirrita christyi (Allen, 1906)
- Epirrita dilutata (Denis & Schiffermuller, 1775)
- Erannis defoliaria (Clerck, 1759)
- Eulithis populata (Linnaeus, 1758)
- Eulithis prunata (Linnaeus, 1758)
- Euphyia biangulata (Haworth, 1809)
- Euphyia frustata (Treitschke, 1828)
- Eupithecia abbreviata Stephens, 1831
- Eupithecia absinthiata (Clerck, 1759)
- Eupithecia alliaria Staudinger, 1870
- Eupithecia carpophagata Staudinger, 1871
- Eupithecia centaureata (Denis & Schiffermuller, 1775)
- Eupithecia cocciferata Milliere, 1864
- Eupithecia denotata (Hübner, 1813)
- Eupithecia distinctaria Herrich-Schäffer, 1848
- Eupithecia dodoneata Guenee, 1858
- Eupithecia extraversaria Herrich-Schäffer, 1852
- Eupithecia haworthiata Doubleday, 1856
- Eupithecia icterata (de Villers, 1789)
- Eupithecia impurata (Hübner, 1813)
- Eupithecia indigata (Hübner, 1813)
- Eupithecia innotata (Hufnagel, 1767)
- Eupithecia intricata (Zetterstedt, 1839)
- Eupithecia irriguata (Hübner, 1813)
- Eupithecia linariata (Denis & Schiffermuller, 1775)
- Eupithecia massiliata Milliere, 1865
- Eupithecia nanata (Hübner, 1813)
- Eupithecia orphnata W. Petersen, 1909
- Eupithecia oxycedrata (Rambur, 1833)
- Eupithecia pauxillaria Boisduval, 1840
- Eupithecia pimpinellata (Hübner, 1813)
- Eupithecia plumbeolata (Haworth, 1809)
- Eupithecia pulchellata Stephens, 1831
- Eupithecia pusillata (Denis & Schiffermuller, 1775)
- Eupithecia pyreneata Mabille, 1871
- Eupithecia satyrata (Hübner, 1813)
- Eupithecia semigraphata Bruand, 1850
- Eupithecia silenata Assmann, 1848
- Eupithecia subfuscata (Haworth, 1809)
- Eupithecia subumbrata (Denis & Schiffermuller, 1775)
- Eupithecia tantillaria Boisduval, 1840
- Eupithecia tripunctaria Herrich-Schäffer, 1852
- Eupithecia venosata (Fabricius, 1787)
- Eupithecia veratraria Herrich-Schäffer, 1848
- Eupithecia vulgata (Haworth, 1809)
- Gandaritis pyraliata (Denis & Schiffermuller, 1775)
- Geometra papilionaria (Linnaeus, 1758)
- Glacies bentelii (Ratzer, 1890)
- Gnophos obfuscata (Denis & Schiffermuller, 1775)
- Gymnoscelis rufifasciata (Haworth, 1809)
- Hemistola chrysoprasaria (Esper, 1795)
- Horisme aemulata (Hübner, 1813)
- Horisme radicaria (de La Harpe, 1855)
- Horisme tersata (Denis & Schiffermuller, 1775)
- Horisme vitalbata (Denis & Schiffermuller, 1775)
- Hydriomena furcata (Thunberg, 1784)
- Hydriomena ruberata (Freyer, 1831)
- Hylaea fasciaria (Linnaeus, 1758)
- Idaea alyssumata (Milliere, 1871)
- Idaea aversata (Linnaeus, 1758)
- Idaea calunetaria (Staudinger, 1859)
- Idaea cervantaria (Milliere, 1869)
- Idaea contiguaria (Hübner, 1799)
- Idaea degeneraria (Hübner, 1799)
- Idaea deversaria (Herrich-Schäffer, 1847)
- Idaea dilutaria (Hübner, 1799)
- Idaea eugeniata (Dardoin & Milliere, 1870)
- Idaea fuscovenosa (Goeze, 1781)
- Idaea humiliata (Hufnagel, 1767)
- Idaea incalcarata (Chretien, 1913)
- Idaea luteolaria (Constant, 1863)
- Idaea mediaria (Hübner, 1819)
- Idaea moniliata (Denis & Schiffermuller, 1775)
- Idaea obsoletaria (Rambur, 1833)
- Idaea ochrata (Scopoli, 1763)
- Idaea ostrinaria (Hübner, 1813)
- Idaea rubraria (Staudinger, 1901)
- Idaea rufaria (Hübner, 1799)
- Idaea rusticata (Denis & Schiffermuller, 1775)
- Idaea squalidaria (Staudinger, 1882)
- Idaea straminata (Borkhausen, 1794)
- Idaea subsaturata (Guenee, 1858)
- Idaea subsericeata (Haworth, 1809)
- Isturgia limbaria (Fabricius, 1775)
- Isturgia miniosaria (Duponchel, 1829)
- Isturgia murinaria (Denis & Schiffermuller, 1775)
- Jodis lactearia (Linnaeus, 1758)
- Lampropteryx suffumata (Denis & Schiffermuller, 1775)
- Ligdia adustata (Denis & Schiffermuller, 1775)
- Lobophora halterata (Hufnagel, 1767)
- Lomaspilis marginata (Linnaeus, 1758)
- Lycia hirtaria (Clerck, 1759)
- Lythria cruentaria (Hufnagel, 1767)
- Macaria brunneata (Thunberg, 1784)
- Macaria liturata (Clerck, 1759)
- Menophra abruptaria (Thunberg, 1792)
- Menophra nycthemeraria (Geyer, 1831)
- Mesotype didymata (Linnaeus, 1758)
- Mesotype verberata (Scopoli, 1763)
- Minoa murinata (Scopoli, 1763)
- Nebula achromaria (de La Harpe, 1853)
- Nebula nebulata (Treitschke, 1828)
- Nychiodes andalusiaria Staudinger, 1892
- Nycterosea obstipata (Fabricius, 1794)
- Odezia atrata (Linnaeus, 1758)
- Odontopera bidentata (Clerck, 1759)
- Onychora agaritharia (Dardoin, 1842)
- Operophtera brumata (Linnaeus, 1758)
- Operophtera fagata (Scharfenberg, 1805)
- Opisthograptis luteolata (Linnaeus, 1758)
- Ourapteryx sambucaria (Linnaeus, 1758)
- Pasiphila rectangulata (Linnaeus, 1758)
- Pennithera firmata (Hübner, 1822)
- Peribatodes abstersaria (Boisduval, 1840)
- Peribatodes ilicaria (Geyer, 1833)
- Peribatodes perversaria (Boisduval, 1840)
- Peribatodes powelli (Oberthur, 1913)
- Peribatodes rhomboidaria (Denis & Schiffermuller, 1775)
- Peribatodes subflavaria (Milliere, 1876)
- Perizoma albulata (Denis & Schiffermuller, 1775)
- Perizoma alchemillata (Linnaeus, 1758)
- Perizoma bifaciata (Haworth, 1809)
- Perizoma blandiata (Denis & Schiffermuller, 1775)
- Perizoma flavosparsata (Wagner, 1926)
- Perizoma hydrata (Treitschke, 1829)
- Perizoma lugdunaria (Herrich-Schäffer, 1855)
- Perizoma obsoletata (Herrich-Schäffer, 1838)
- Petrophora narbonea (Linnaeus, 1767)
- Phigalia pilosaria (Denis & Schiffermuller, 1775)
- Philereme vetulata (Denis & Schiffermuller, 1775)
- Plagodis pulveraria (Linnaeus, 1758)
- Problepsis ocellata (Frivaldszky, 1845)
- Pseudopanthera macularia (Linnaeus, 1758)
- Pseudoterpna coronillaria (Hübner, 1817)
- Psodos quadrifaria (Sulzer, 1776)
- Pungeleria capreolaria (Denis & Schiffermuller, 1775)
- Rheumaptera hastata (Linnaeus, 1758)
- Rhodometra sacraria (Linnaeus, 1767)
- Rhodostrophia calabra (Petagna, 1786)
- Rhodostrophia vibicaria (Clerck, 1759)
- Rhoptria asperaria (Hübner, 1817)
- Sciadia tenebraria (Esper, 1806)
- Scopula asellaria (Herrich-Schäffer, 1847)
- Scopula floslactata (Haworth, 1809)
- Scopula imitaria (Hübner, 1799)
- Scopula incanata (Linnaeus, 1758)
- Scopula marginepunctata (Goeze, 1781)
- Scopula rufomixtaria (de Graslin, 1863)
- Scopula immorata (Linnaeus, 1758)
- Scopula ornata (Scopoli, 1763)
- Scopula submutata (Treitschke, 1828)
- Scotopteryx angularia (de Villers, 1789)
- Scotopteryx bipunctaria (Denis & Schiffermuller, 1775)
- Scotopteryx chenopodiata (Linnaeus, 1758)
- Scotopteryx coelinaria (de Graslin, 1863)
- Scotopteryx luridata (Hufnagel, 1767)
- Scotopteryx moeniata (Scopoli, 1763)
- Scotopteryx mucronata (Scopoli, 1763)
- Scotopteryx octodurensis (Favre, 1903)
- Scotopteryx peribolata (Hübner, 1817)
- Selenia dentaria (Fabricius, 1775)
- Selenia lunularia (Hübner, 1788)
- Selidosema brunnearia (de Villers, 1789)
- Selidosema taeniolaria (Hübner, 1813)
- Siona lineata (Scopoli, 1763)
- Spargania luctuata (Denis & Schiffermuller, 1775)
- Stegania trimaculata (de Villers, 1789)
- Tephronia oranaria Staudinger, 1892
- Tephronia sepiaria (Hufnagel, 1767)
- Thalera fimbrialis (Scopoli, 1763)
- Thera britannica (Turner, 1925)
- Thera cognata (Thunberg, 1792)
- Thera obeliscata (Hübner, 1787)
- Thera variata (Denis & Schiffermuller, 1775)
- Theria primaria (Haworth, 1809)
- Thetidia smaragdaria (Fabricius, 1787)
- Timandra comae Schmidt, 1931
- Trichopteryx carpinata (Borkhausen, 1794)
- Triphosa dubitata (Linnaeus, 1758)
- Triphosa sabaudiata (Duponchel, 1830)
- Xanthorhoe designata (Hufnagel, 1767)
- Xanthorhoe fluctuata (Linnaeus, 1758)
- Xanthorhoe montanata (Denis & Schiffermuller, 1775)
- Xanthorhoe spadicearia (Denis & Schiffermuller, 1775)

=== Hepialidae ===
- Pharmacis fusconebulosa (DeGeer, 1778)
- Pharmacis pyrenaicus (Donzel, 1838)
- Triodia sylvina (Linnaeus, 1761)

=== Heterogynidae ===
- Heterogynis penella (Hübner, 1819)

=== Lasiocampidae ===
- Dendrolimus pini (Linnaeus, 1758)
- Gastropacha quercifolia (Linnaeus, 1758)
- Gastropacha populifolia (Denis & Schiffermuller, 1775)
- Lasiocampa quercus (Linnaeus, 1758)
- Lasiocampa trifolii (Denis & Schiffermuller, 1775)
- Macrothylacia rubi (Linnaeus, 1758)
- Malacosoma castrensis (Linnaeus, 1758)
- Malacosoma neustria (Linnaeus, 1758)
- Poecilocampa populi (Linnaeus, 1758)
- Trichiura crataegi (Linnaeus, 1758)

=== Momphidae ===
- Mompha miscella (Denis & Schiffermuller, 1775)

=== Nepticulidae ===
- Stigmella ilicifoliella (Mendes, 1918)

=== Noctuidae ===
- Abrostola asclepiadis (Denis & Schiffermuller, 1775)
- Abrostola triplasia (Linnaeus, 1758)
- Acontia lucida (Hufnagel, 1766)
- Acronicta leporina (Linnaeus, 1758)
- Acronicta alni (Linnaeus, 1767)
- Acronicta psi (Linnaeus, 1758)
- Acronicta auricoma (Denis & Schiffermuller, 1775)
- Acronicta euphorbiae (Denis & Schiffermuller, 1775)
- Acronicta rumicis (Linnaeus, 1758)
- Actinotia polyodon (Clerck, 1759)
- Actinotia radiosa (Esper, 1804)
- Agrochola lychnidis (Denis & Schiffermuller, 1775)
- Agrochola helvola (Linnaeus, 1758)
- Agrochola litura (Linnaeus, 1758)
- Agrochola lunosa (Haworth, 1809)
- Agrochola lota (Clerck, 1759)
- Agrochola macilenta (Hübner, 1809)
- Agrochola circellaris (Hufnagel, 1766)
- Agrotis bigramma (Esper, 1790)
- Agrotis cinerea (Denis & Schiffermuller, 1775)
- Agrotis clavis (Hufnagel, 1766)
- Agrotis exclamationis (Linnaeus, 1758)
- Agrotis ipsilon (Hufnagel, 1766)
- Agrotis puta (Hübner, 1803)
- Agrotis segetum (Denis & Schiffermuller, 1775)
- Agrotis simplonia (Geyer, 1832)
- Agrotis trux (Hübner, 1824)
- Allophyes alfaroi Agenjo, 1951
- Ammoconia caecimacula (Denis & Schiffermuller, 1775)
- Ammopolia witzenmanni (Standfuss, 1890)
- Amphipoea oculea (Linnaeus, 1761)
- Amphipyra berbera Rungs, 1949
- Amphipyra effusa Boisduval, 1828
- Amphipyra pyramidea (Linnaeus, 1758)
- Amphipyra tragopoginis (Clerck, 1759)
- Amphipyra cinnamomea (Goeze, 1781)
- Anaplectoides prasina (Denis & Schiffermuller, 1775)
- Anarta myrtilli (Linnaeus, 1761)
- Anarta odontites (Boisduval, 1829)
- Anarta pugnax (Hübner, 1824)
- Anarta trifolii (Hufnagel, 1766)
- Anorthoa munda (Denis & Schiffermuller, 1775)
- Antitype chi (Linnaeus, 1758)
- Apamea crenata (Hufnagel, 1766)
- Apamea furva (Denis & Schiffermuller, 1775)
- Apamea lateritia (Hufnagel, 1766)
- Apamea lithoxylaea (Denis & Schiffermuller, 1775)
- Apamea maillardi (Geyer, 1834)
- Apamea monoglypha (Hufnagel, 1766)
- Apamea platinea (Treitschke, 1825)
- Apamea sordens (Hufnagel, 1766)
- Apamea sublustris (Esper, 1788)
- Aporophyla nigra (Haworth, 1809)
- Apterogenum ypsillon (Denis & Schiffermuller, 1775)
- Atethmia centrago (Haworth, 1809)
- Athetis pallustris (Hübner, 1808)
- Autographa bractea (Denis & Schiffermuller, 1775)
- Autographa gamma (Linnaeus, 1758)
- Autographa jota (Linnaeus, 1758)
- Autographa pulchrina (Haworth, 1809)
- Axylia putris (Linnaeus, 1761)
- Brachylomia viminalis (Fabricius, 1776)
- Bryonycta pineti (Staudinger, 1859)
- Bryophila raptricula (Denis & Schiffermuller, 1775)
- Bryophila ravula (Hübner, 1813)
- Bryophila domestica (Hufnagel, 1766)
- Bryophila microglossa (Rambur, 1858)
- Callopistria latreillei (Duponchel, 1827)
- Calophasia lunula (Hufnagel, 1766)
- Calophasia platyptera (Esper, 1788)
- Caradrina clavipalpis Scopoli, 1763
- Caradrina flavirena Guenee, 1852
- Caradrina selini Boisduval, 1840
- Caradrina aspersa Rambur, 1834
- Ceramica pisi (Linnaeus, 1758)
- Cerapteryx graminis (Linnaeus, 1758)
- Cerastis rubricosa (Denis & Schiffermuller, 1775)
- Charanyca ferruginea (Esper, 1785)
- Chersotis alpestris (Boisduval, 1837)
- Chersotis cuprea (Denis & Schiffermuller, 1775)
- Chersotis margaritacea (Villers, 1789)
- Chersotis multangula (Hübner, 1803)
- Chersotis ocellina (Denis & Schiffermuller, 1775)
- Chloantha hyperici (Denis & Schiffermuller, 1775)
- Cleonymia yvanii (Duponchel, 1833)
- Colocasia coryli (Linnaeus, 1758)
- Conisania luteago (Denis & Schiffermuller, 1775)
- Conistra daubei (Duponchel, 1838)
- Conistra gallica (Lederer, 1857)
- Conistra rubiginosa (Scopoli, 1763)
- Conistra vaccinii (Linnaeus, 1761)
- Conistra erythrocephala (Denis & Schiffermuller, 1775)
- Conistra rubiginea (Denis & Schiffermuller, 1775)
- Conistra staudingeri (Graslin, 1863)
- Conistra torrida (Lederer, 1857)
- Cosmia trapezina (Linnaeus, 1758)
- Cosmia affinis (Linnaeus, 1767)
- Craniophora pontica (Staudinger, 1878)
- Cryphia algae (Fabricius, 1775)
- Cucullia absinthii (Linnaeus, 1761)
- Cucullia campanulae Freyer, 1831
- Cucullia lucifuga (Denis & Schiffermuller, 1775)
- Cucullia umbratica (Linnaeus, 1758)
- Cucullia xeranthemi Boisduval, 1840
- Cucullia scrophulariae (Denis & Schiffermuller, 1775)
- Cucullia verbasci (Linnaeus, 1758)
- Dasypolia templi (Thunberg, 1792)
- Diachrysia chrysitis (Linnaeus, 1758)
- Diarsia guadarramensis (Boursin, 1928)
- Dichagyris flammatra (Denis & Schiffermuller, 1775)
- Dichagyris musiva (Hübner, 1803)
- Dichagyris candelisequa (Denis & Schiffermuller, 1775)
- Dichagyris constanti (Milliere, 1860)
- Dichagyris forcipula (Denis & Schiffermuller, 1775)
- Dichagyris nigrescens (Hofner, 1888)
- Dichagyris renigera (Hübner, 1808)
- Dicycla oo (Linnaeus, 1758)
- Diloba caeruleocephala (Linnaeus, 1758)
- Dryobota labecula (Esper, 1788)
- Dryobotodes tenebrosa (Esper, 1789)
- Dryobotodes eremita (Fabricius, 1775)
- Dryobotodes monochroma (Esper, 1790)
- Dryobotodes roboris (Geyer, 1835)
- Dypterygia scabriuscula (Linnaeus, 1758)
- Egira conspicillaris (Linnaeus, 1758)
- Enargia paleacea (Esper, 1788)
- Epilecta linogrisea (Denis & Schiffermuller, 1775)
- Epipsilia grisescens (Fabricius, 1794)
- Eremobia ochroleuca (Denis & Schiffermuller, 1775)
- Eremohadena halimi (Milliere, 1877)
- Euchalcia variabilis (Piller, 1783)
- Eugnorisma glareosa (Esper, 1788)
- Eugnorisma depuncta (Linnaeus, 1761)
- Eupsilia transversa (Hufnagel, 1766)
- Eurois occulta (Linnaeus, 1758)
- Euxoa aquilina (Denis & Schiffermuller, 1775)
- Euxoa conspicua (Hübner, 1824)
- Euxoa decora (Denis & Schiffermuller, 1775)
- Euxoa nigricans (Linnaeus, 1761)
- Euxoa obelisca (Denis & Schiffermuller, 1775)
- Euxoa recussa (Hübner, 1817)
- Euxoa temera (Hübner, 1808)
- Euxoa tritici (Linnaeus, 1761)
- Griposia aprilina (Linnaeus, 1758)
- Hada plebeja (Linnaeus, 1761)
- Hadena perplexa (Denis & Schiffermuller, 1775)
- Hadena ruetimeyeri Boursin, 1951
- Hadena albimacula (Borkhausen, 1792)
- Hadena bicruris (Hufnagel, 1766)
- Hadena caesia (Denis & Schiffermuller, 1775)
- Hadena compta (Denis & Schiffermuller, 1775)
- Hadena confusa (Hufnagel, 1766)
- Hadena filograna (Esper, 1788)
- Hadena magnolii (Boisduval, 1829)
- Hecatera bicolorata (Hufnagel, 1766)
- Hecatera dysodea (Denis & Schiffermuller, 1775)
- Helicoverpa armigera (Hübner, 1808)
- Heliothis peltigera (Denis & Schiffermuller, 1775)
- Heliothis viriplaca (Hufnagel, 1766)
- Hoplodrina ambigua (Denis & Schiffermuller, 1775)
- Hoplodrina blanda (Denis & Schiffermuller, 1775)
- Hoplodrina octogenaria (Goeze, 1781)
- Hoplodrina respersa (Denis & Schiffermuller, 1775)
- Hoplodrina superstes (Ochsenheimer, 1816)
- Ipimorpha subtusa (Denis & Schiffermuller, 1775)
- Jodia croceago (Denis & Schiffermuller, 1775)
- Lacanobia thalassina (Hufnagel, 1766)
- Lacanobia oleracea (Linnaeus, 1758)
- Lacanobia w-latinum (Hufnagel, 1766)
- Lasionycta imbecilla (Fabricius, 1794)
- Lasionycta proxima (Hübner, 1809)
- Lateroligia ophiogramma (Esper, 1794)
- Leucania loreyi (Duponchel, 1827)
- Leucania comma (Linnaeus, 1761)
- Leucochlaena oditis (Hübner, 1822)
- Lithophane furcifera (Hufnagel, 1766)
- Lithophane ornitopus (Hufnagel, 1766)
- Lithophane semibrunnea (Haworth, 1809)
- Lithophane leautieri (Boisduval, 1829)
- Litoligia literosa (Haworth, 1809)
- Lophoterges millierei (Staudinger, 1871)
- Luperina nickerlii (Freyer, 1845)
- Luperina testacea (Denis & Schiffermuller, 1775)
- Lycophotia porphyrea (Denis & Schiffermuller, 1775)
- Mamestra brassicae (Linnaeus, 1758)
- Melanchra persicariae (Linnaeus, 1761)
- Mesapamea secalella Remm, 1983
- Mesapamea secalis (Linnaeus, 1758)
- Mesogona acetosellae (Denis & Schiffermuller, 1775)
- Mesoligia furuncula (Denis & Schiffermuller, 1775)
- Mniotype adusta (Esper, 1790)
- Mormo maura (Linnaeus, 1758)
- Mythimna albipuncta (Denis & Schiffermuller, 1775)
- Mythimna ferrago (Fabricius, 1787)
- Mythimna l-album (Linnaeus, 1767)
- Mythimna conigera (Denis & Schiffermuller, 1775)
- Mythimna impura (Hübner, 1808)
- Mythimna vitellina (Hübner, 1808)
- Mythimna unipuncta (Haworth, 1809)
- Mythimna sicula (Treitschke, 1835)
- Noctua comes Hübner, 1813
- Noctua fimbriata (Schreber, 1759)
- Noctua interjecta Hübner, 1803
- Noctua interposita (Hübner, 1790)
- Noctua janthina Denis & Schiffermuller, 1775
- Noctua pronuba (Linnaeus, 1758)
- Noctua tirrenica Biebinger, Speidel & Hanigk, 1983
- Nyctobrya muralis (Forster, 1771)
- Ochropleura leucogaster (Freyer, 1831)
- Ochropleura plecta (Linnaeus, 1761)
- Oligia fasciuncula (Haworth, 1809)
- Oligia latruncula (Denis & Schiffermuller, 1775)
- Oligia strigilis (Linnaeus, 1758)
- Olivenebula xanthochloris (Boisduval, 1840)
- Omia cymbalariae (Hübner, 1809)
- Orthosia gracilis (Denis & Schiffermuller, 1775)
- Orthosia cerasi (Fabricius, 1775)
- Orthosia cruda (Denis & Schiffermuller, 1775)
- Orthosia populeti (Fabricius, 1775)
- Orthosia incerta (Hufnagel, 1766)
- Orthosia gothica (Linnaeus, 1758)
- Pachetra sagittigera (Hufnagel, 1766)
- Panchrysia v-argenteum (Esper, 1798)
- Panemeria tenebrata (Scopoli, 1763)
- Panolis flammea (Denis & Schiffermuller, 1775)
- Papestra biren (Goeze, 1781)
- Parastichtis suspecta (Hübner, 1817)
- Peridroma saucia (Hübner, 1808)
- Phlogophora meticulosa (Linnaeus, 1758)
- Polia hepatica (Clerck, 1759)
- Polia nebulosa (Hufnagel, 1766)
- Polychrysia moneta (Fabricius, 1787)
- Polymixis argillaceago (Hübner, 1822)
- Polymixis dubia (Duponchel, 1836)
- Polymixis xanthomista (Hübner, 1819)
- Protolampra sobrina (Duponchel, 1843)
- Rhizedra lutosa (Hübner, 1803)
- Rhyacia helvetina (Boisduval, 1833)
- Rhyacia lucipeta (Denis & Schiffermuller, 1775)
- Sideridis rivularis (Fabricius, 1775)
- Sideridis reticulata (Goeze, 1781)
- Spaelotis ravida (Denis & Schiffermuller, 1775)
- Spaelotis senna (Freyer, 1829)
- Spodoptera exigua (Hübner, 1808)
- Stilbia anomala (Haworth, 1812)
- Subacronicta megacephala (Denis & Schiffermuller, 1775)
- Syngrapha interrogationis (Linnaeus, 1758)
- Thalpophila vitalba (Freyer, 1834)
- Tholera decimalis (Poda, 1761)
- Trigonophora haasi (Staudinger, 1892)
- Trigonophora flammea (Esper, 1785)
- Trigonophora jodea (Herrich-Schäffer, 1850)
- Tyta luctuosa (Denis & Schiffermuller, 1775)
- Valeria jaspidea (Villers, 1789)
- Xanthia gilvago (Denis & Schiffermuller, 1775)
- Xanthia icteritia (Hufnagel, 1766)
- Xanthia ocellaris (Borkhausen, 1792)
- Xanthia ruticilla (Esper, 1791)
- Xanthia togata (Esper, 1788)
- Xestia ashworthii (Doubleday, 1855)
- Xestia c-nigrum (Linnaeus, 1758)
- Xestia triangulum (Hufnagel, 1766)
- Xestia agathina (Duponchel, 1827)
- Xestia baja (Denis & Schiffermuller, 1775)
- Xestia castanea (Esper, 1798)
- Xestia xanthographa (Denis & Schiffermuller, 1775)
- Xylena exsoleta (Linnaeus, 1758)
- Xylocampa areola (Esper, 1789)

=== Nolidae ===
- Bena bicolorana (Fuessly, 1775)
- Meganola strigula (Denis & Schiffermuller, 1775)
- Nola cicatricalis (Treitschke, 1835)
- Nola cucullatella (Linnaeus, 1758)
- Nola subchlamydula Staudinger, 1871
- Pseudoips prasinana (Linnaeus, 1758)

=== Notodontidae ===
- Cerura iberica (Templado & Ortiz, 1966)
- Clostera anachoreta (Denis & Schiffermuller, 1775)
- Clostera pigra (Hufnagel, 1766)
- Drymonia querna (Denis & Schiffermuller, 1775)
- Furcula bifida (Brahm, 1787)
- Harpyia milhauseri (Fabricius, 1775)
- Notodonta dromedarius (Linnaeus, 1767)
- Notodonta tritophus (Denis & Schiffermuller, 1775)
- Notodonta ziczac (Linnaeus, 1758)
- Peridea anceps (Goeze, 1781)
- Phalera bucephala (Linnaeus, 1758)
- Pheosia gnoma (Fabricius, 1776)
- Pheosia tremula (Clerck, 1759)
- Pterostoma palpina (Clerck, 1759)
- Ptilodon capucina (Linnaeus, 1758)
- Rhegmatophila alpina (Bellier, 1881)
- Stauropus fagi (Linnaeus, 1758)
- Thaumetopoea pityocampa (Denis & Schiffermuller, 1775)

=== Psychidae ===
- Penestoglossa pyrenaella Herrmann, 2006
- Pseudobankesia casaella Hattenschwiler, 1994

=== Pterophoridae ===
- Marasmarcha oxydactylus (Staudinger, 1859)
- Merrifieldia leucodactyla (Denis & Schiffermuller, 1775)
- Stenoptilia pelidnodactyla (Stein, 1837)
- Stenoptilia pterodactyla (Linnaeus, 1761)
- Stenoptilia zophodactylus (Duponchel, 1840)

=== Saturniidae ===
- Actias isabellae (Graells, 1849)
- Saturnia pavonia (Linnaeus, 1758)
- Saturnia pyri (Denis & Schiffermuller, 1775)

=== Scythrididae ===
- Enolmis acanthella (Godart, 1824)
- Scythris obscurella (Scopoli, 1763)
- Scythris picaepennis (Haworth, 1828)
- Scythris subseliniella (Heinemann, 1876)

=== Sesiidae ===
- Chamaesphecia bibioniformis (Esper, 1800)
- Pyropteron chrysidiformis (Esper, 1782)
- Sesia apiformis (Clerck, 1759)

=== Sphingidae ===
- Acherontia atropos (Linnaeus, 1758)
- Agrius convolvuli (Linnaeus, 1758)
- Deilephila elpenor (Linnaeus, 1758)
- Deilephila porcellus (Linnaeus, 1758)
- Hemaris tityus (Linnaeus, 1758)
- Hippotion celerio (Linnaeus, 1758)
- Hyles euphorbiae (Linnaeus, 1758)
- Hyles livornica (Esper, 1780)
- Laothoe populi (Linnaeus, 1758)
- Macroglossum stellatarum (Linnaeus, 1758)
- Mimas tiliae (Linnaeus, 1758)
- Proserpinus proserpina (Pallas, 1772)
- Smerinthus ocellata (Linnaeus, 1758)
- Sphinx ligustri Linnaeus, 1758
- Sphinx maurorum (Jordan, 1931)
- Sphinx pinastri Linnaeus, 1758

=== Thyrididae ===
- Thyris fenestrella (Scopoli, 1763)

=== Tineidae ===
- Ateliotum petrinella (Herrich-Schäffer, 1854)
- Eudarcia gallica (Petersen, 1962)
- Infurcitinea atrifasciella (Staudinger, 1871)
- Infurcitinea roesslerella (Heyden, 1865)
- Monopis obviella (Denis & Schiffermuller, 1775)
- Myrmecozela ochraceella (Tengstrom, 1848)
- Niditinea fuscella (Linnaeus, 1758)

=== Tortricidae ===
- Aethes cnicana (Westwood, 1854)
- Aethes margaritana (Haworth, 1811)
- Aethes tesserana (Denis & Schiffermuller, 1775)
- Clavigesta sylvestrana (Curtis, 1850)
- Cnephasia stephensiana (Doubleday, 1849)
- Cochylis atricapitana (Stephens, 1852)
- Cochylis hybridella (Hübner, 1813)
- Dichrorampha harpeana Frey, 1870
- Eana argentana (Clerck, 1759)
- Endothenia gentianaeana (Hübner, 1799)
- Epinotia ramella (Linnaeus, 1758)
- Eucosma pupillana (Clerck, 1759)
- Eulia ministrana (Linnaeus, 1758)
- Eupoecilia angustana (Hübner, 1799)
- Grapholita molesta (Busck, 1916)
- Hedya pruniana (Hübner, 1799)
- Metendothenia atropunctana (Zetterstedt, 1839)
- Notocelia cynosbatella (Linnaeus, 1758)
- Notocelia roborana (Denis & Schiffermuller, 1775)
- Pammene aurana (Fabricius, 1775)
- Phtheochroa frigidana (Guenee, 1845)
- Rhopobota naevana (Hübner, 1817)
- Tortrix viridana Linnaeus, 1758

=== Zygaenidae ===
- Adscita geryon (Hübner, 1813)
- Adscita statices (Linnaeus, 1758)
- Aglaope infausta (Linnaeus, 1767)
- Jordanita globulariae (Hübner, 1793)
- Zygaena carniolica (Scopoli, 1763)
- Zygaena fausta (Linnaeus, 1767)
- Zygaena hilaris Ochsenheimer, 1808
- Zygaena purpuralis (Brunnich, 1763)
- Zygaena sarpedon (Hübner, 1790)
- Zygaena anthyllidis Boisduval, 1828
- Zygaena exulans (Hohenwarth, 1792)
- Zygaena filipendulae (Linnaeus, 1758)
- Zygaena lonicerae (Scheven, 1777)
- Zygaena loti (Denis & Schiffermuller, 1775)
- Zygaena nevadensis Rambur, 1858
- Zygaena osterodensis Reiss, 1921
- Zygaena transalpina (Esper, 1780)
