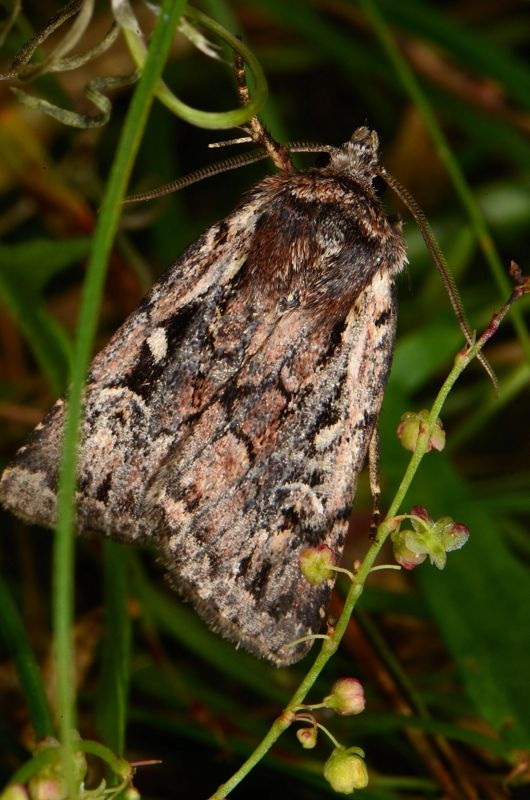

Scientific classification
- Kingdom: Animalia
- Phylum: Arthropoda
- Class: Insecta
- Order: Lepidoptera
- Superfamily: Noctuoidea
- Family: Noctuidae
- Genus: Xestia
- Species: X. agathina

Binomial name
- Xestia agathina (Esper, 1790)

Synonyms
- Noctua agathina Duponchel, 1827

= Xestia agathina =

Heath rustic

Species of moth

Xestia agathina, the heath rustic, is a moth of the family Noctuidae. It is found in western and central Europe and Morocco.

== Technical description and variation ==
The wingspan is 28–36 mm. Forewing greyish rufous; costal area paler for two-thirds, edged below at base by a fine dark streak; claviform stigma small and obscure; cell black brown; the two stigmata pale, orbicular variable, sometimes large, sometimes contracted to a white spot; hindwing dark grey; antennae of male serrate, with sessile fascicles of cilia. In the form hebridicola Stgr., from the Hebrides, the forewing becomes paler and loses the red tinge; in scopariae Mill, from France the red tinge is overpowered by black suffusion.

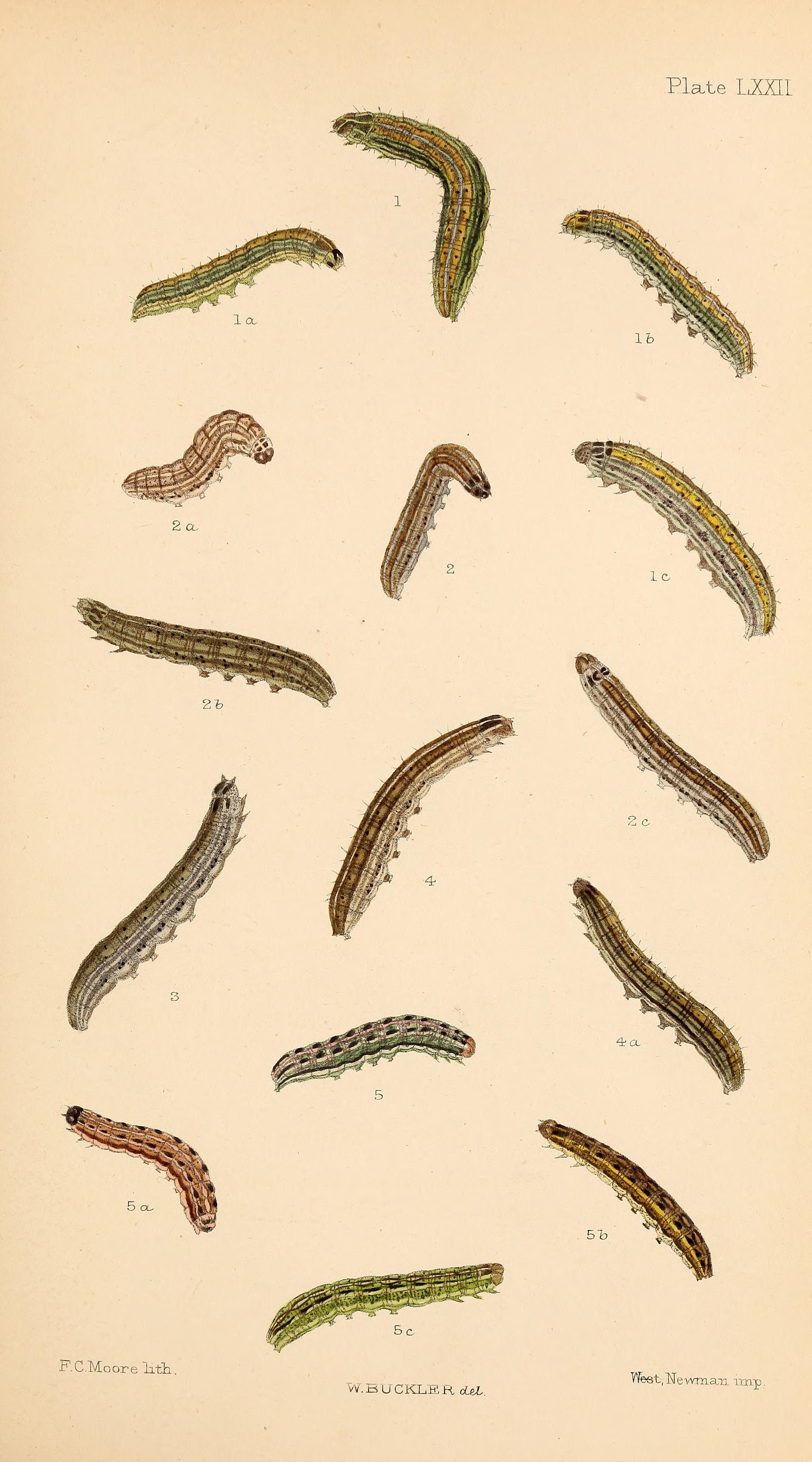
Figs 5,5a,5b,5c larva after last moult

== Biology ==
Adults are on wing from in September.

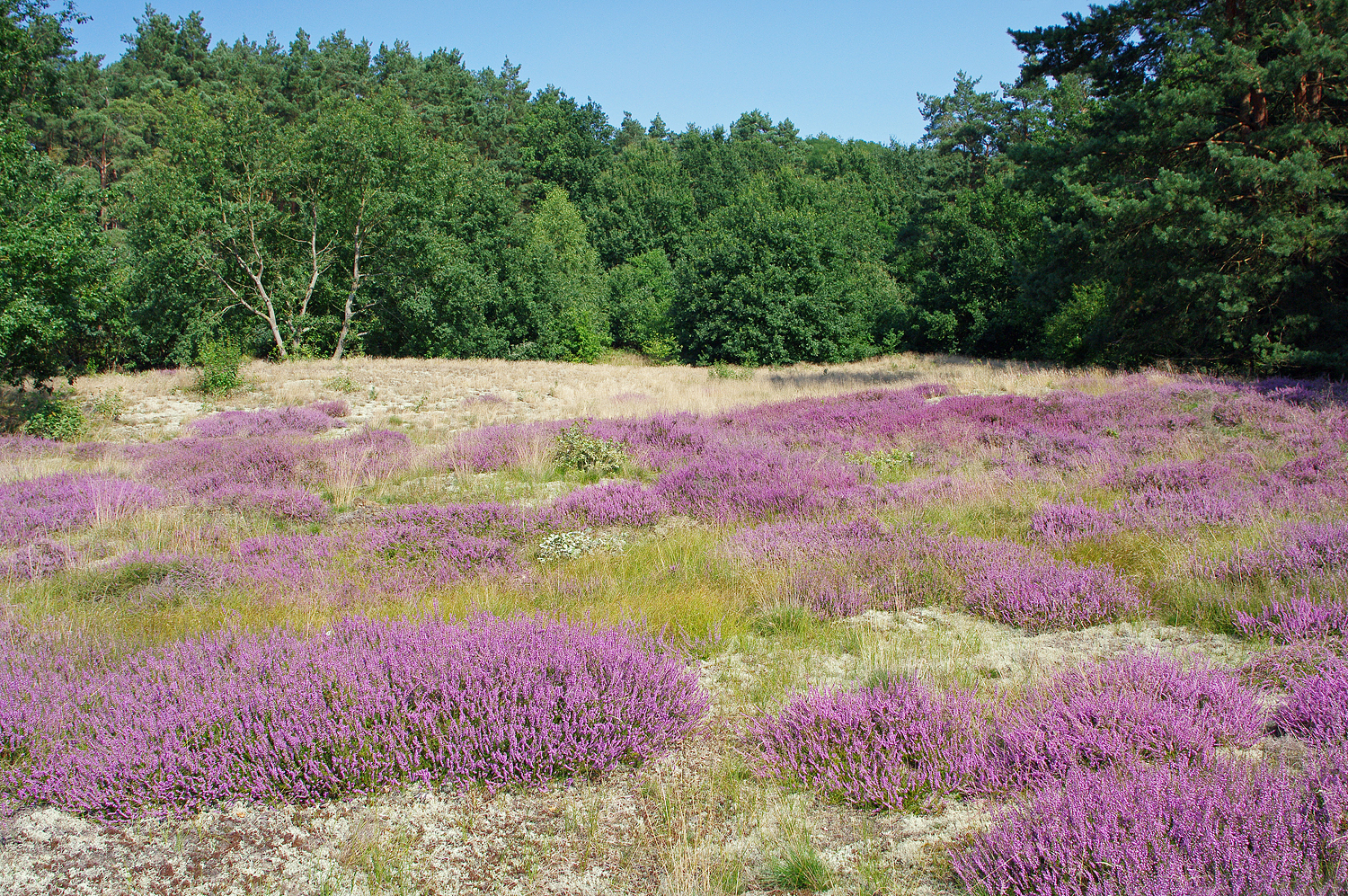
Habitat

Larva green, with pale dark-edged lines, the spiracular broad and conspicuous. The larvae feed on Calluna species.
