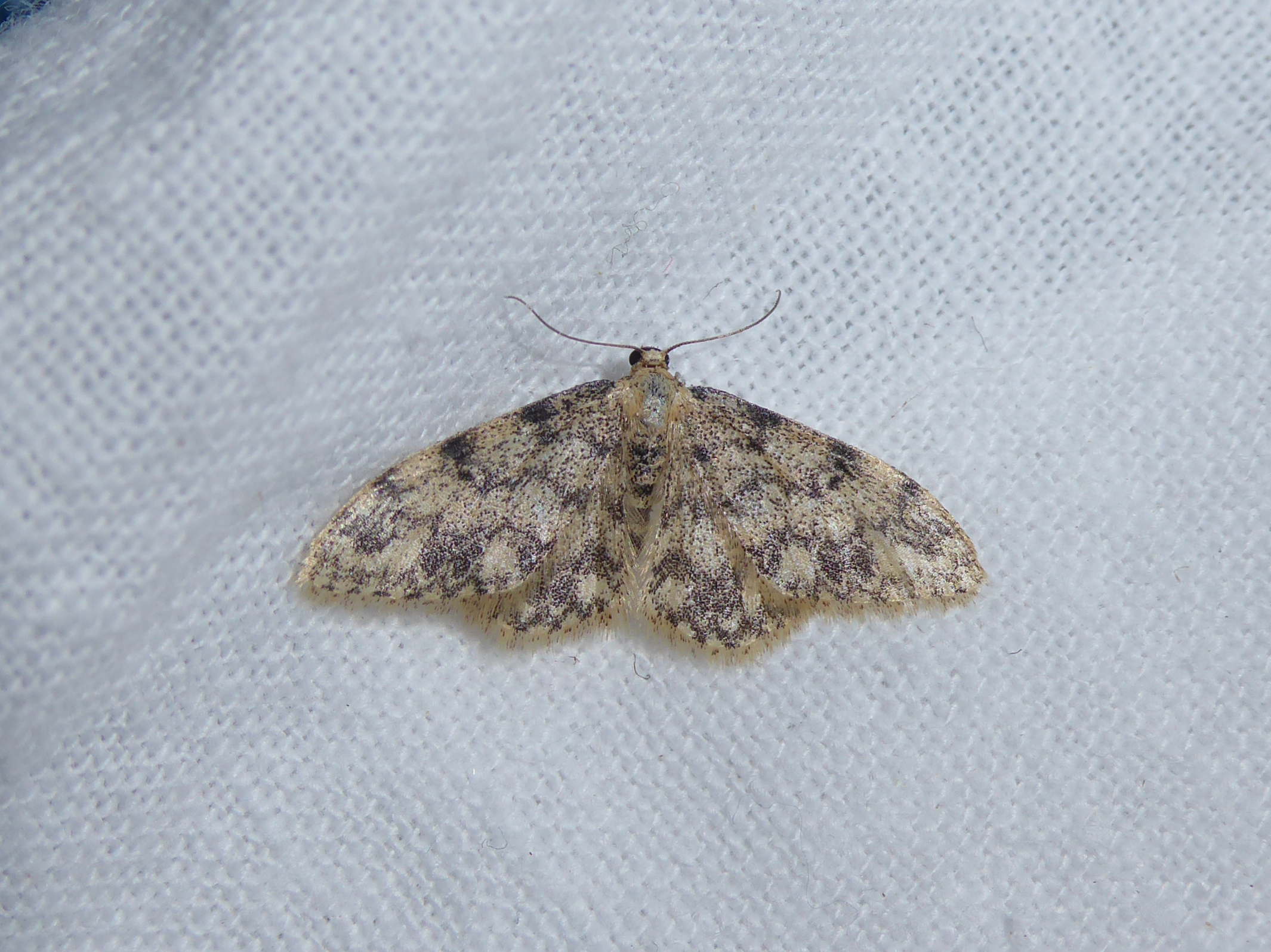

Scientific classification
- Kingdom: Animalia
- Phylum: Arthropoda
- Clade: Pancrustacea
- Class: Insecta
- Order: Lepidoptera
- Family: Geometridae
- Genus: Idaea
- Species: I. contiguaria

Binomial name
- Idaea contiguaria (Hübner, 1799)

= Idaea contiguaria =

Weaver's wave

Species of moth

Idaea contiguaria, the Weaver's wave, is a moth of the family Geometridae. It was first described by Jacob Hübner in 1799 and is found in Europe.

The species has a wingspan of about 20 mm.South describes it- "In colour, the moth is whity brown, more or less dusted or clouded with dark grey; except in the darker forms, three irregular black lines on the fore wings, and two on the hind wings, are clearly seen. It flies at dusk in June and July and sits by day on lichen-covered rocks. The caterpillar is pale ochreous brown, with irregular dark brown lines. It feeds on ling (Calluna) and crowberry (Empetrum) from September to May; but when eggs are obtained, the caterpillar hatching from them may be kept on chickweed, knotgrass, etc., and the moth be reared the same year. Mr R. Tait records the finding of ten caterpillars on navelwort (Cotyledon) growing among the heather in a very sheltered corner among rocks in North Wales, at Easter, 1906. He also notes that moths reared in captivity pair readily. The British localities, all in North Wales, are Aber, Bangor, Barmouth, Bettws-y-coed, Conway, Dolgelly, Llanfairfechan, and Penmaenmawr."

The adults fly in one generation from June to July.

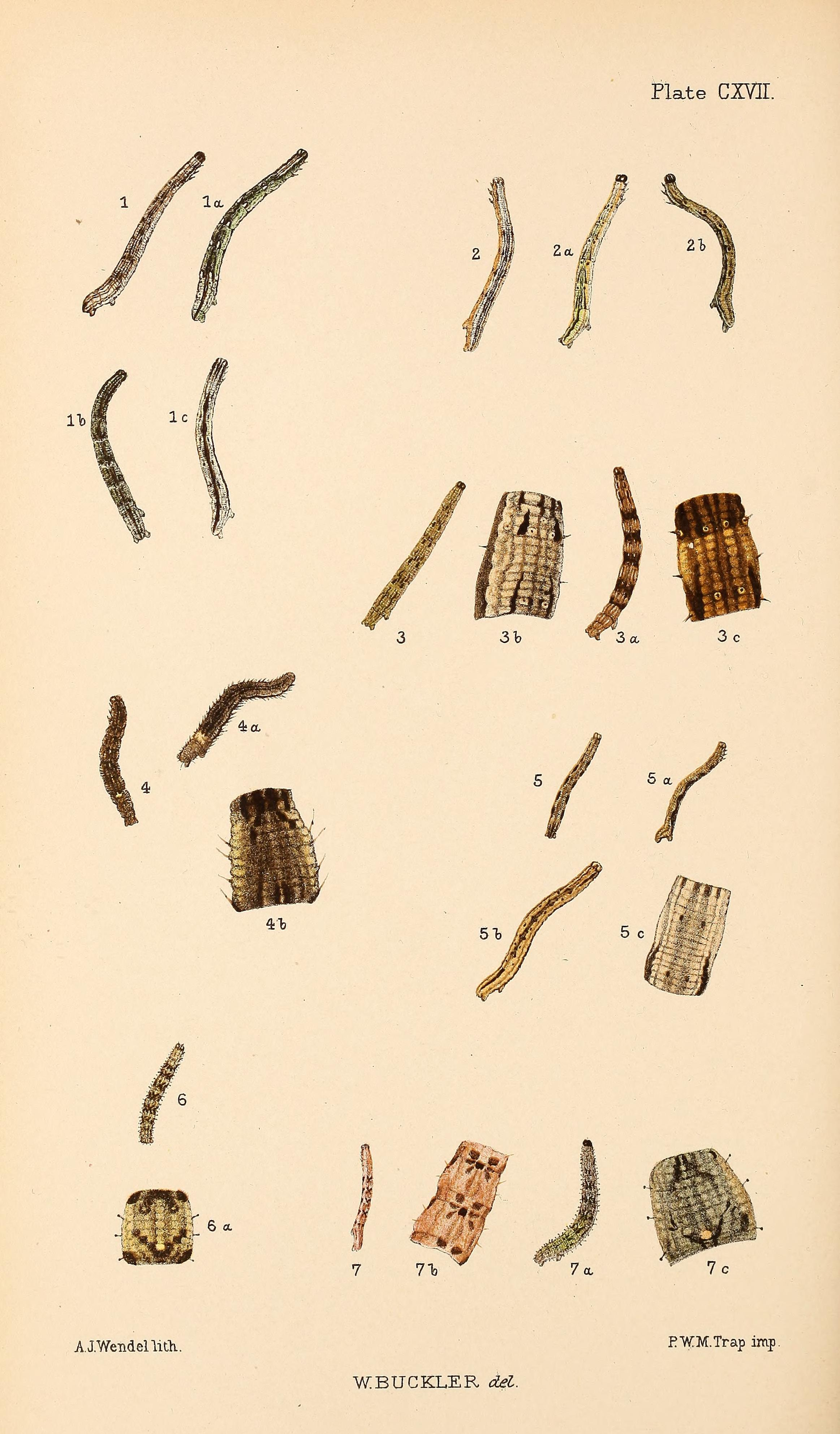
Figs.5, 5a, 5b Larvae in various stages 5c enlarged view of segment

The larvae feed on heather, crowberry and Umbilicus.

== Notes ==
1. The flight season refers to the British Isles. This may vary in other parts of the range.
