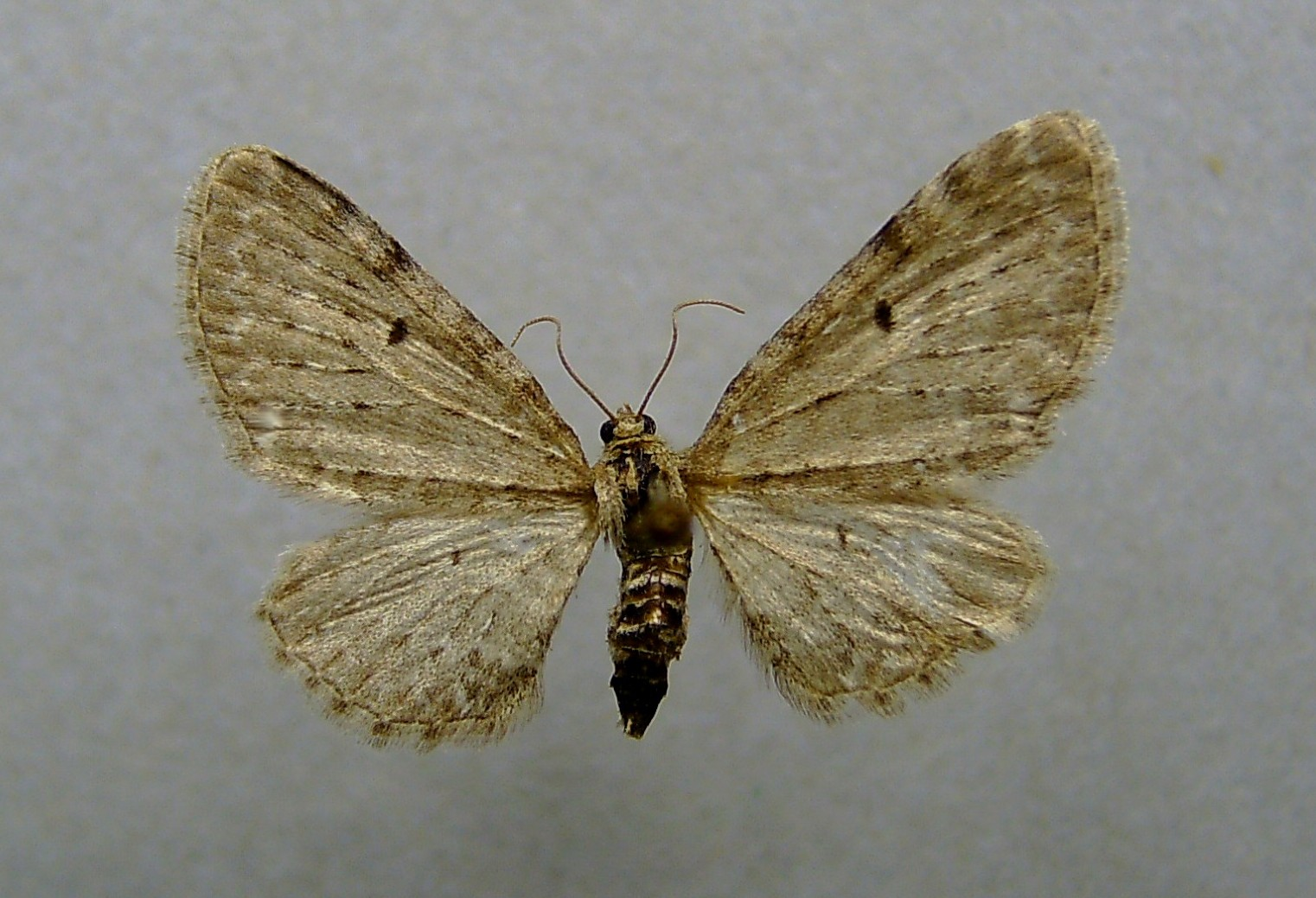

Scientific classification
- Kingdom: Animalia
- Phylum: Arthropoda
- Class: Insecta
- Order: Lepidoptera
- Family: Geometridae
- Genus: Eupithecia
- Species: E. veratraria

Binomial name
- Eupithecia veratraria (Herrich-Schäffer, 1848)

Synonyms
- Eupithecia geiserata Mironov, 1988; Eupithecia eynensata Graslin, 1863; Eupithecia magnata Milliere, 1873

= Eupithecia veratraria =

Species of moth

Eupithecia veratraria is a moth of the family Geometridae first described by Gottlieb August Wilhelm Herrich-Schäffer in 1848. It is found from the mountainous areas of Europe and Asia up to Japan.

The wingspan is 24–28 mm. Adults are on wing from June to August in one generation per year.

The larvae feed on Veratrum album. Larvae can be found from July to October. The species overwinters in the pupal stage. It can overwinter up to three times.

== Subspecies ==
- Eupithecia veratraria veratraria (central and southern Europe, except the Pyrenees)
- Eupithecia veratraria arctica Viidalepp, 1974 (arctic Norway, northern Ural and the Kola Peninsula)
- Eupithecia veratraria geyserata Mironov 1988 (Kamchatka)
- Eupithecia veratraria eynensata de Graslin, 1863 (Pyrenees)
- Eupithecia veratraria homophaea Djakonov, 1926 (the Altai and the Ussuri region)
- Eupithecia veratraria perpaupera Inoue, 1965 (Japan, Korea)
