= Stigmella ilicifoliella =

Scientific classification
- Kingdom: Animalia
- Phylum: Arthropoda
- Class: Insecta
- Order: Lepidoptera
- Family: Nepticulidae
- Genus: Stigmella
- Species: S. ilicifoliella

Binomial name
- Stigmella ilicifoliella (Mendes, 1918)

Synonyms
- Nepticula ilicifoliella Mendes, 1918; Stigmella ilicivora nigra Dufrane, 1955

Species of moth

Stigmella ilicifoliella is a moth of the family Nepticulidae. It is widespread in Portugal and Spain. In France, it is known from old specimens along the Atlantic coast near Bordeaux and in the Hérault and the Côte d’Azur near Cannes.

The wingspan is 6-6.6 mm. Adults are on wing from June to early September.

The larvae feed on Quercus ilex, Quercus ilex rotundifolia and Quercus suber. They mine the leaves of their host plant.
