= Elachista andorraensis =

Scientific classification
- Kingdom: Animalia
- Phylum: Arthropoda
- Class: Insecta
- Order: Lepidoptera
- Family: Elachistidae
- Genus: Elachista
- Species: E. andorraensis

Binomial name
- Elachista andorraensis Traugott-Olsen, 1988

Species of moth

Elachista andorraensis is a moth of the family Elachistidae. It is found in Andorra.

Remarks: The species was described on the basis of a single male with incomplete genitalia. It is close to, if not conspecific with E. triseriatella based on those characters that remain (see Traugott-Olsen 1988). Its status can be established only with further material from the type locality (Andorra).
