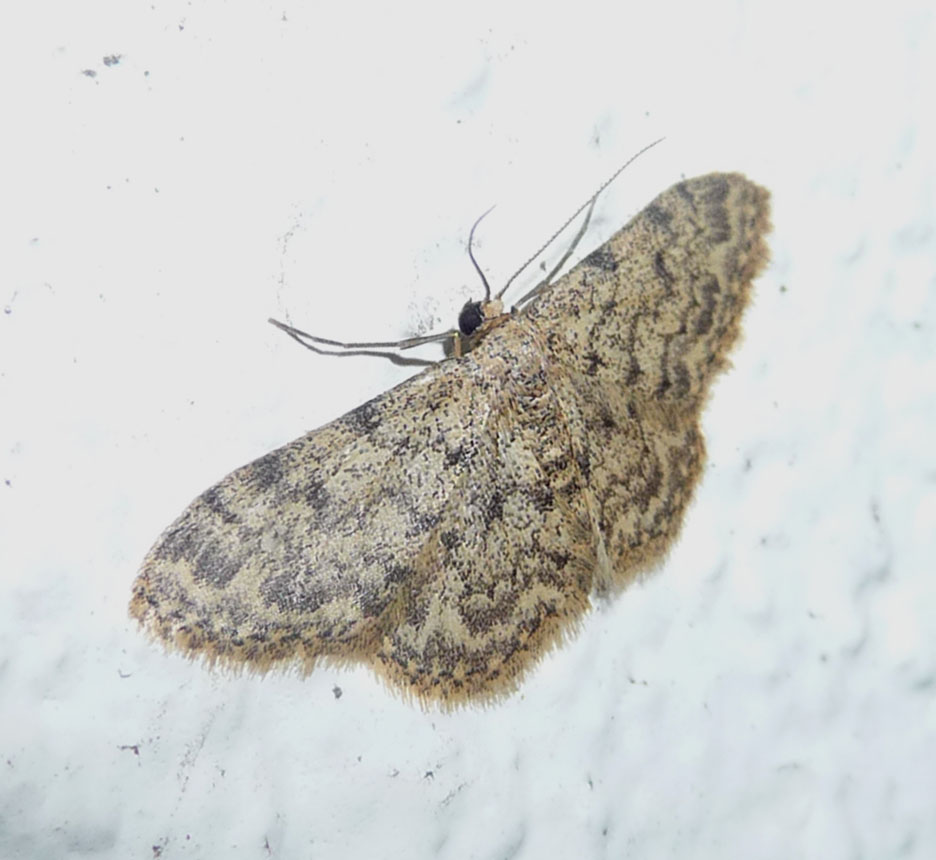

Scientific classification
- Domain: Eukaryota
- Kingdom: Animalia
- Phylum: Arthropoda
- Class: Insecta
- Order: Lepidoptera
- Family: Geometridae
- Genus: Scopula
- Species: S. rufomixtaria

Binomial name
- Scopula rufomixtaria (Graslin, 1863)

Synonyms
- Acidalia rufomixtaria Graslin, 1863; Glossotrophia rufomixtaria; Glossotrophia annae Mentzer, 1990; Glossotrophia saharensis Hausmann, 1993; Scopula annae

= Scopula rufomixtaria =

Species of geometer moth in subfamily Sterrhinae

Scopula rufomixtaria is a moth of the family Geometridae. It is found in France and on the Iberian Peninsula.

== Subspecies ==
- Scopula rufomixtaria rufomixtaria
- Scopula rufomixtaria saharensis (Hausmann, 1993)
