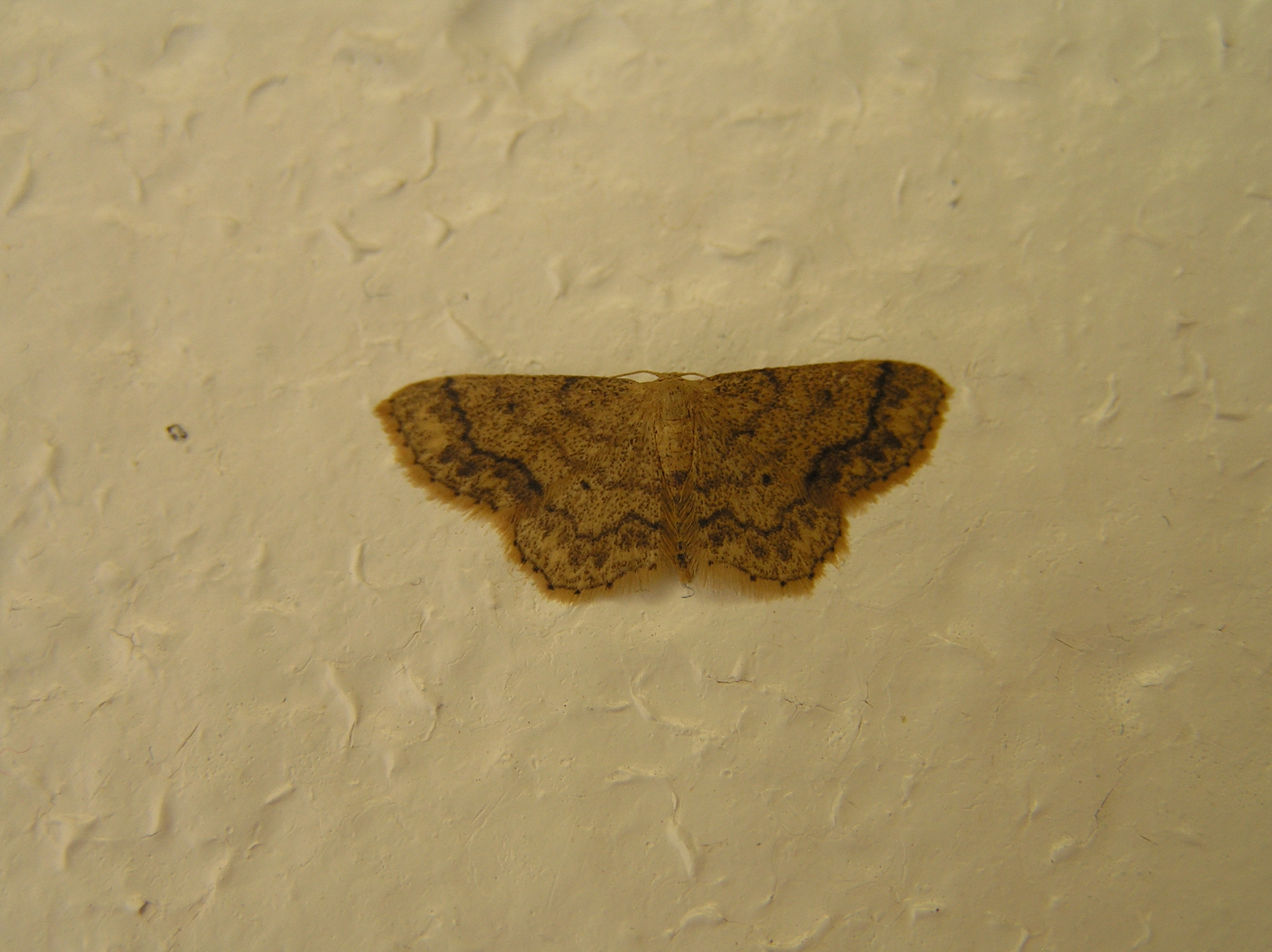

Scientific classification
- Kingdom: Animalia
- Phylum: Arthropoda
- Clade: Pancrustacea
- Class: Insecta
- Order: Lepidoptera
- Family: Geometridae
- Genus: Idaea
- Species: I. subsaturata

Binomial name
- Idaea subsaturata (Guenée, 1858)

Synonyms
- Acidalia subsaturata; Acidalia miserata; Acidalia subherbariata

= Idaea subsaturata =

Species of moth

Idaea subsaturata is a moth of the family Geometridae. It is found in the coastal regions of the Iberian Peninsula (from southern Portugal to the eastern Pyrenees), northern Spain and in small populations near Madrid and in northern Portugal. It is also found in isolated populations in France (Depts. Vendée, Deux-Sèvres, Lot, Aveyron, Lozère, Gard, Herault, Aude, Pyrenées Orientales and Var). It is also found in North Africa, from North-eastern Morocco and northern Algeria up to Tunisia and western Libya.

The wingspan is 14–15 mm. The moth flies in up to three generations. In low areas it flies from May to October, in mountainous areas from July to August.

The larvae feed on various herbaceous plants, including Taraxacum officinale, Lactuca sativa, Polygonum aviculare.
