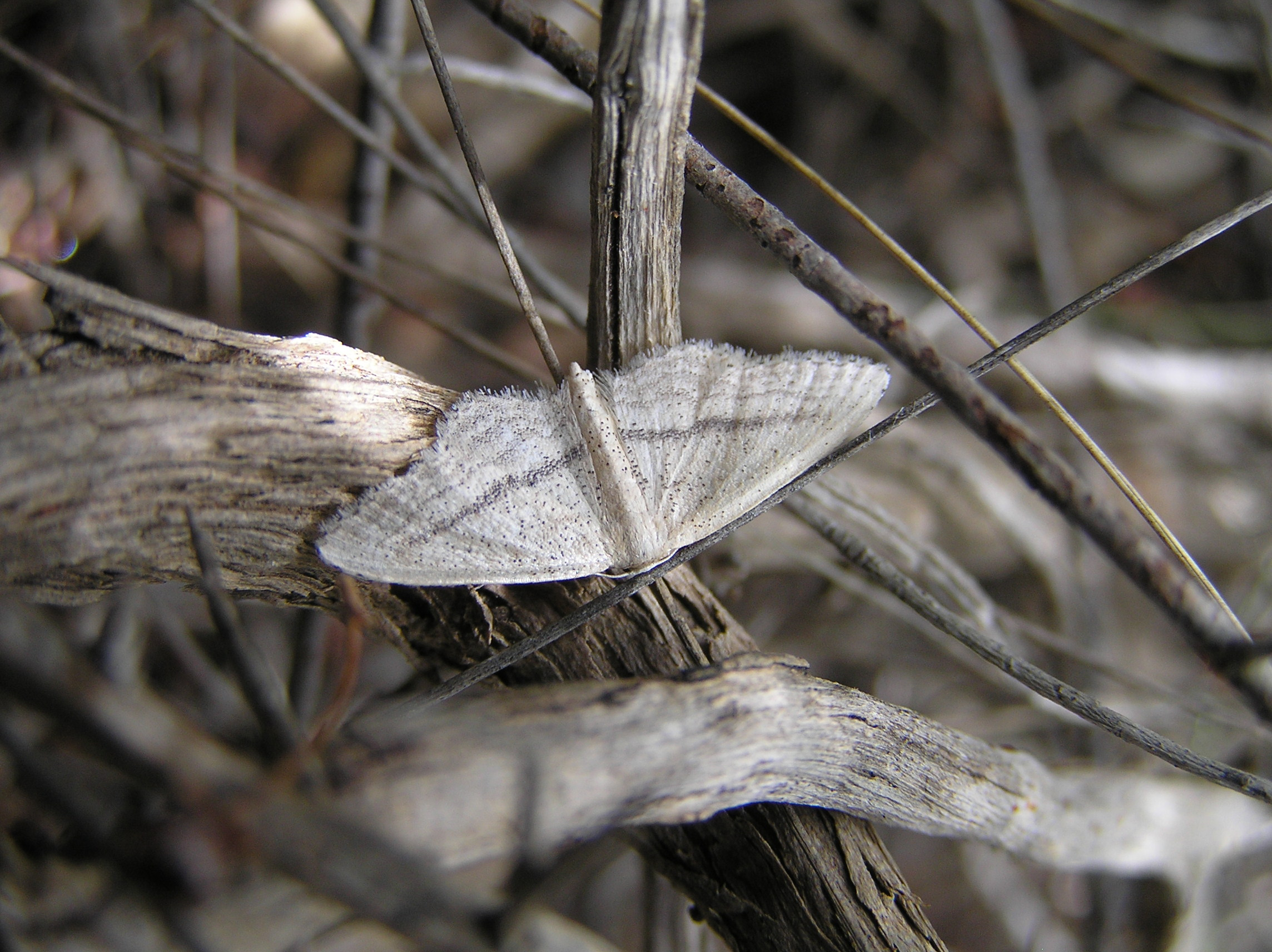

Scientific classification
- Kingdom: Animalia
- Phylum: Arthropoda
- Clade: Pancrustacea
- Class: Insecta
- Order: Lepidoptera
- Family: Geometridae
- Genus: Idaea
- Species: I. mediaria

Binomial name
- Idaea mediaria (Hübner, 1896)

= Idaea mediaria =

Species of moth

Idaea mediaria is a moth of the family Geometridae. It is found in south-western Europe, Corsica, Sardinia, Tuscany and North Africa. The preferred habitat consists of dry and hot areas at elevations from 1,300–1,900 metres (4,300–6,200 ft) above sea level.

The wingspan is 14–19 millimetres (0.55–0.75 in). The adults fly from July to September..

The larvae feed on various herbaceous plants.

== Notes ==
1. The flight season refers to France. This may vary in other parts of the range.
