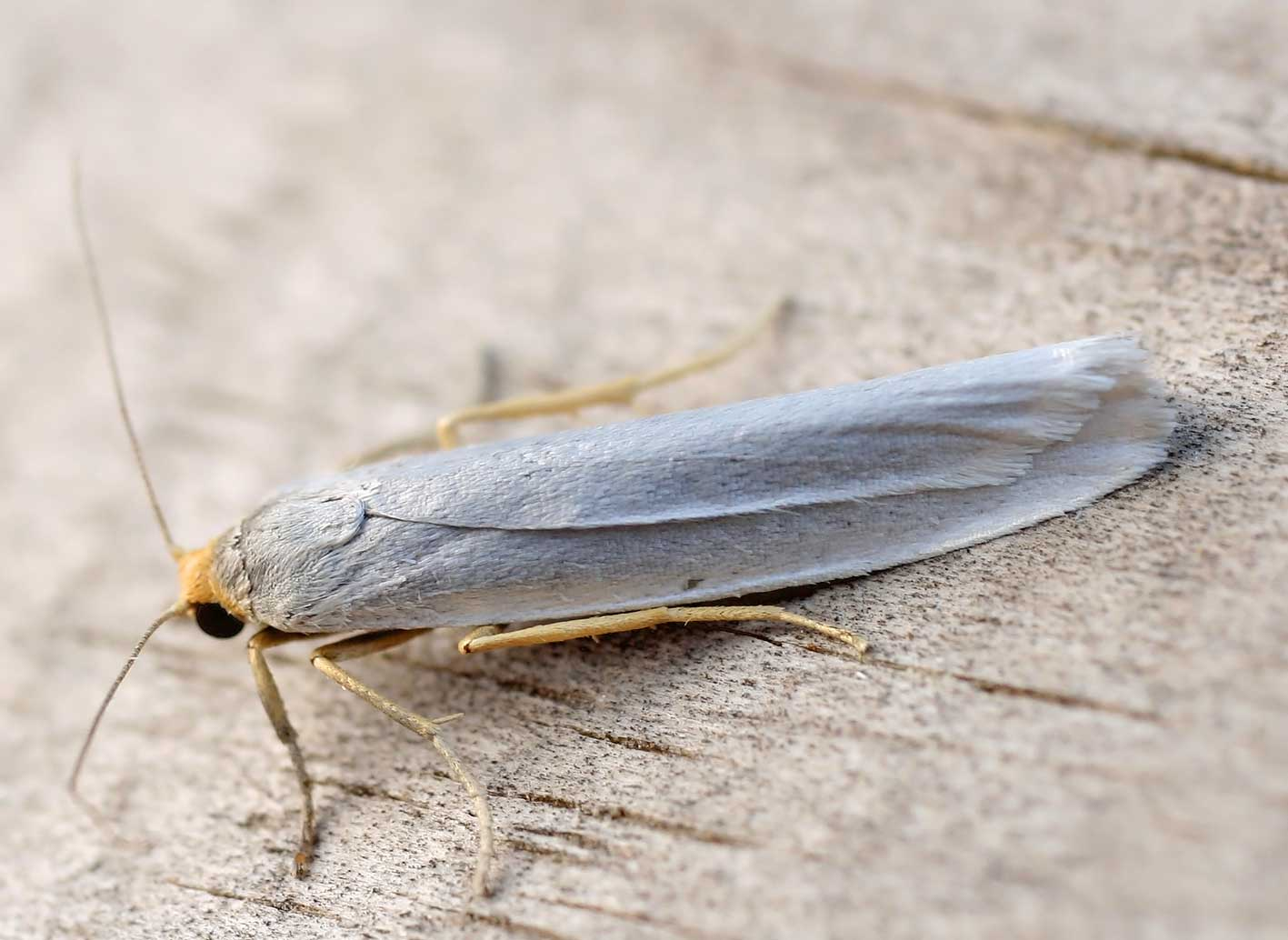

Scientific classification
- Domain: Eukaryota
- Kingdom: Animalia
- Phylum: Arthropoda
- Class: Insecta
- Order: Lepidoptera
- Superfamily: Noctuoidea
- Family: Erebidae
- Subfamily: Arctiinae
- Genus: Eilema
- Species: E. uniola

Binomial name
- Eilema uniola (Rambur, 1866)

= Eilema uniola =

Species of moth

Eilema uniola is a moth of the subfamily Arctiinae first described by Jules Pierre Rambur in 1866. It is found in Spain, Portugal, France and Italy.

The larvae feed on lichen.
