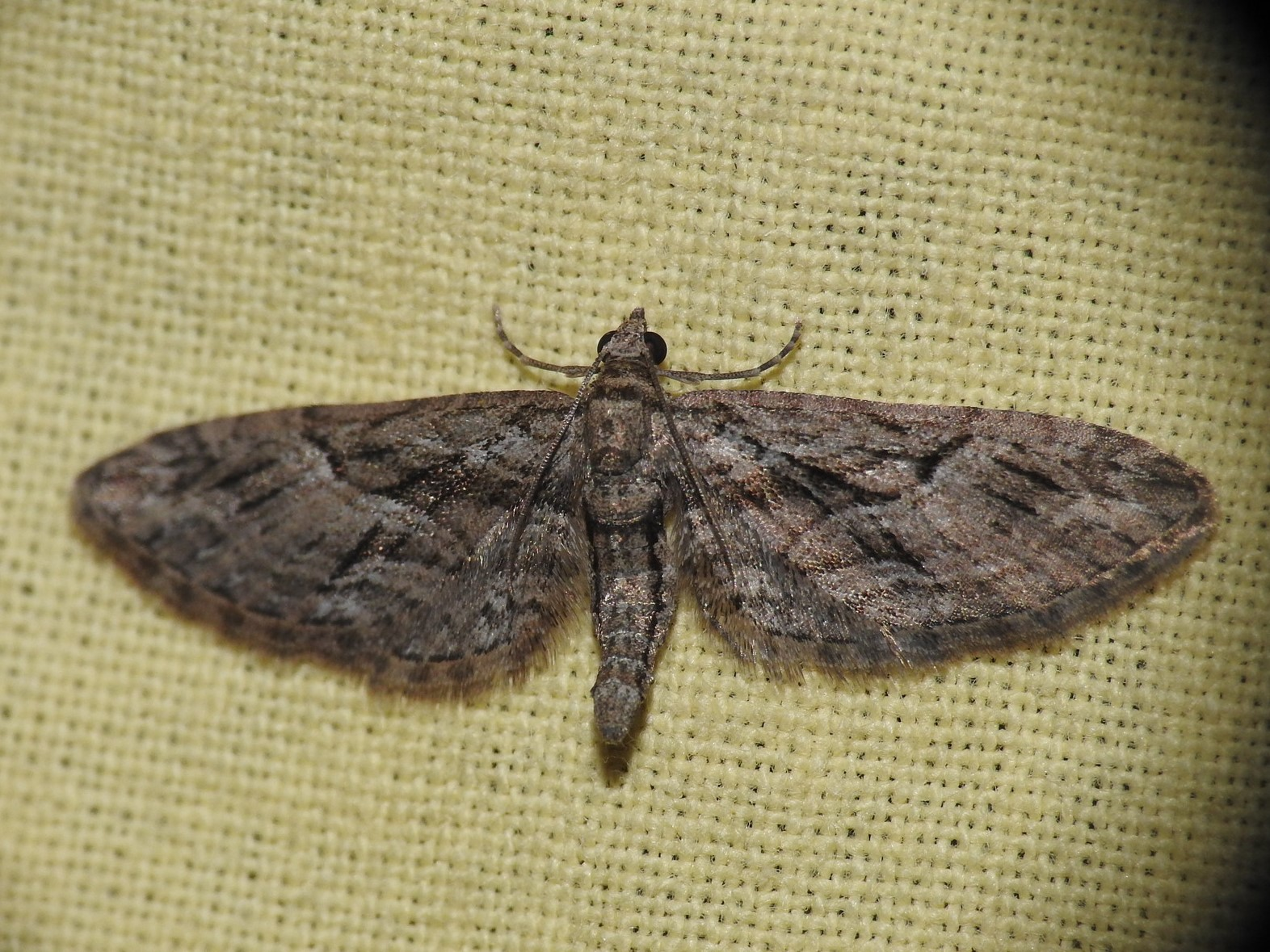

Scientific classification
- Domain: Eukaryota
- Kingdom: Animalia
- Phylum: Arthropoda
- Class: Insecta
- Order: Lepidoptera
- Family: Geometridae
- Genus: Eupithecia
- Species: E. oxycedrata

Binomial name
- Eupithecia oxycedrata (Rambur, 1833)

Synonyms
- Larentia oxycedrata Rambur, 1833; Eupithecia oxycedraria Boisduval, 1840; Eupithecia provinciata Milliere, 1872; Eupithecia adscriptaria Staudinger, 1871; Eupithecia adscriptaria macedoniata Pinker, 1976

= Eupithecia oxycedrata =

Species of moth

Eupithecia oxycedrata is a species of moth in the family Geometridae. It is found in Spain, southern Portugal, the Balearic Islands, southern France, Corsica, Sardinia, Sicily, Malta, Italy, Slovenia, Croatia, Bosnia and Herzegovina, Montenegro, North Macedonia, Bulgaria, Greece, Crete, western Romania and the Crimea. It is also found in North Africa, from Morocco to Tunisia, and in Turkey. The habitat consists of dry maquis, especially where junipers grow.

The wingspan is 16-19.5 mm. There are two generations per year, with adults on wing from early April to late June and again from early September to mid October.

The larvae feed on the needles and flowers of Juniperus oxycedrus.
