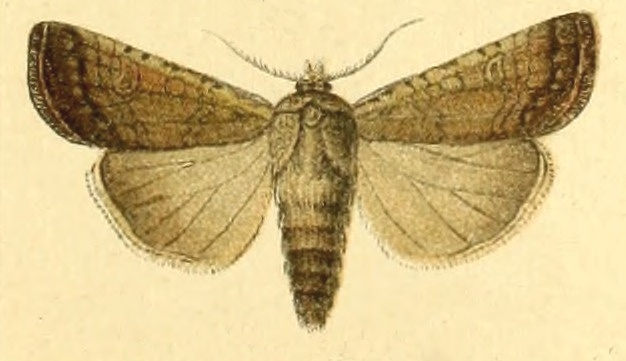

Scientific classification
- Domain: Eukaryota
- Kingdom: Animalia
- Phylum: Arthropoda
- Class: Insecta
- Order: Lepidoptera
- Superfamily: Noctuoidea
- Family: Noctuidae
- Genus: Euxoa
- Species: E. conspicua

Binomial name
- Euxoa conspicua (Hübner, [1827])

Synonyms
- Noctua agricola Boisduval, 1829; Agrotis agricola (Boisduval, 1829); Euxoa agricola (Boisduval, 1829); Agrotis lycarum Herrich-Schäffer, [1850]; Agrotis squalida Eversmann, 1856; Agrotis abdita de Joannis, 1891; Euxoa abscondita Warren, 1909; Euxoa osthelderi Corti in Seitz, 1931

= Euxoa conspicua =

Species of moth

Euxoa conspicua is a moth of the family Noctuidae. It is found in Portugal, Spain, Andorra, France, Italy, Corsica, Crete, Cyprus, Romania, Bulgaria, Greece, Ukraine and southern and eastern Russia, east to China and northern India. It is also present in the Levant.

== Description ==
Warren states E. conspicua Hbn. (= agricola Boisd., lycarum H.-Sch., squalida Ev.) (6h). Forewing luteous grey, dusted and shaded with fuscous, the dark and light shades contrasting; the lines double; the median shade distinct; claviform stigma with black outline; orbicular and reniform large, generally conspicuously pale, or with pale outlines; cell fuscous; hindwing dull grey with the base whitish; in Europe restricted to the South, occurring in the Canaries, Spain, France, Greece and S. Russia, and widely distributed through West and Central Asia; in the ab. abscondita nom. nov. (= abdita Stgr. nec Joan.) (6i) the markings are all obscured by a luteous grey suffusion. .

== Biology ==
Adults are on wing from June to July. There is one generation per year.
