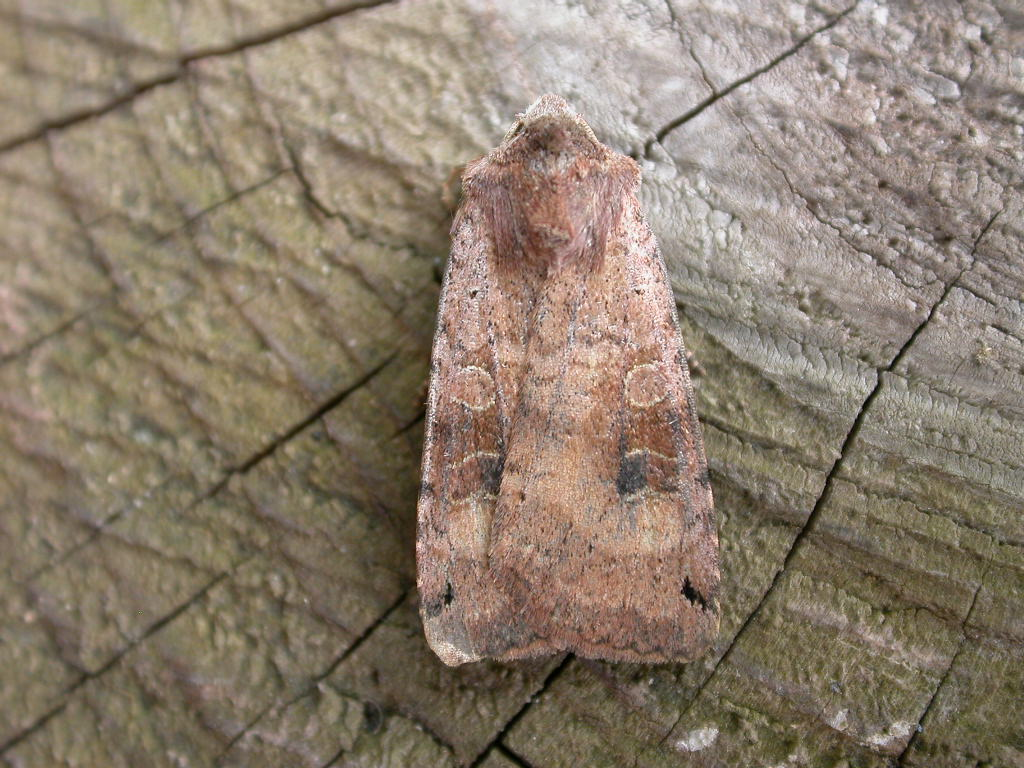

Scientific classification
- Kingdom: Animalia
- Phylum: Arthropoda
- Class: Insecta
- Order: Lepidoptera
- Superfamily: Noctuoidea
- Family: Noctuidae
- Genus: Xestia
- Species: X. baja

Binomial name
- Xestia baja Denis & Schiffermüller, 1775

= Xestia baja =

Species of moth

Xestia baja, the dotted clay, is a species of moth of the family Noctuidae. It is found in Europe, Turkey, northern Iran, Transcaucasia, the Caucasus, central Asia, Siberia, Mongolia, Tibet, China, Korea and Japan.

== Technical description and variation ==
The wingspan is 35–40 mm. Forewing dull red brown, with slight lilac-grey tinge in places; a distinct black preapical costal bar; upper stigmata large, with slight pale rings; lower lobe of reniform dark; median shade forming a brown space between the stigmata; a black dot near base of cell; hindwing ochreous or yellowish grey. ab. bajula Stgr. is smaller than the type and suffused with grey, without any red tinge; in the northern form punctata Auriv, the lines are prominently marked by dots on the veins; purpurea Tutt, grisea Tutt and coerulescens Tutt are merely colour variations.

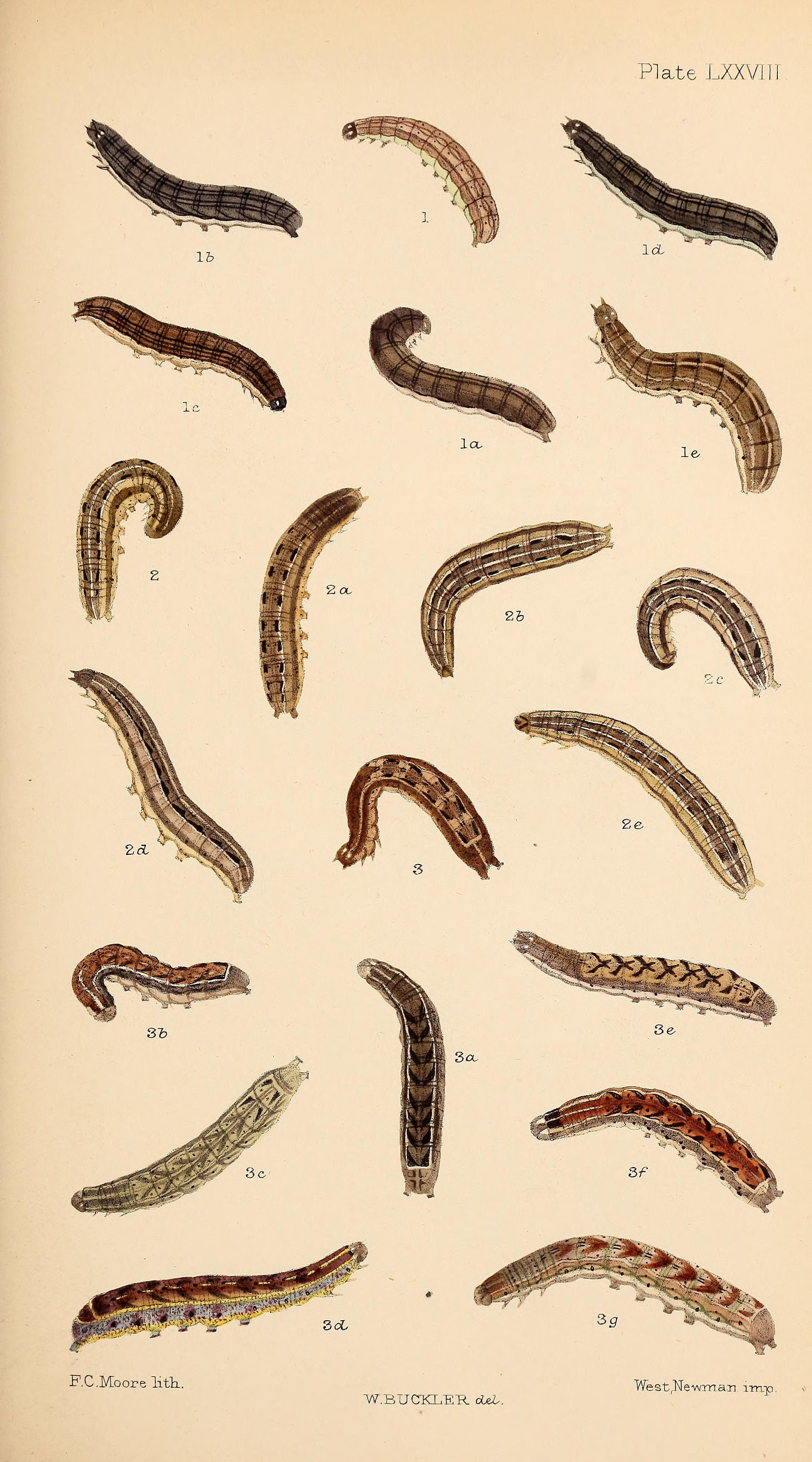
Figs 3, 3a, 3b, 3c, 3d, 3e, 3f, 3g larvae in various stages

== Biology ==
The moth flies from July to August depending on the location.

Larva polyphagous, brown or grey, with a red tinge; the lines pale; a row of oblique dark sublateral bars; a pale bar on segment 12; head pale brown. The larvae feed on Myrica gale, Rubus species and other plants and trees.
