= Coleophora ribasella =

Scientific classification
- Kingdom: Animalia
- Phylum: Arthropoda
- Clade: Pancrustacea
- Class: Insecta
- Order: Lepidoptera
- Family: Coleophoridae
- Genus: Coleophora
- Species: C. ribasella

Binomial name
- Coleophora ribasella Baldizzone, 1982

Species of moth

Coleophora ribasella is a moth of the family Coleophoridae. It is found in France and Spain.

The larvae feed on Artemisia campestris. They create a very slender tubular silken case.
