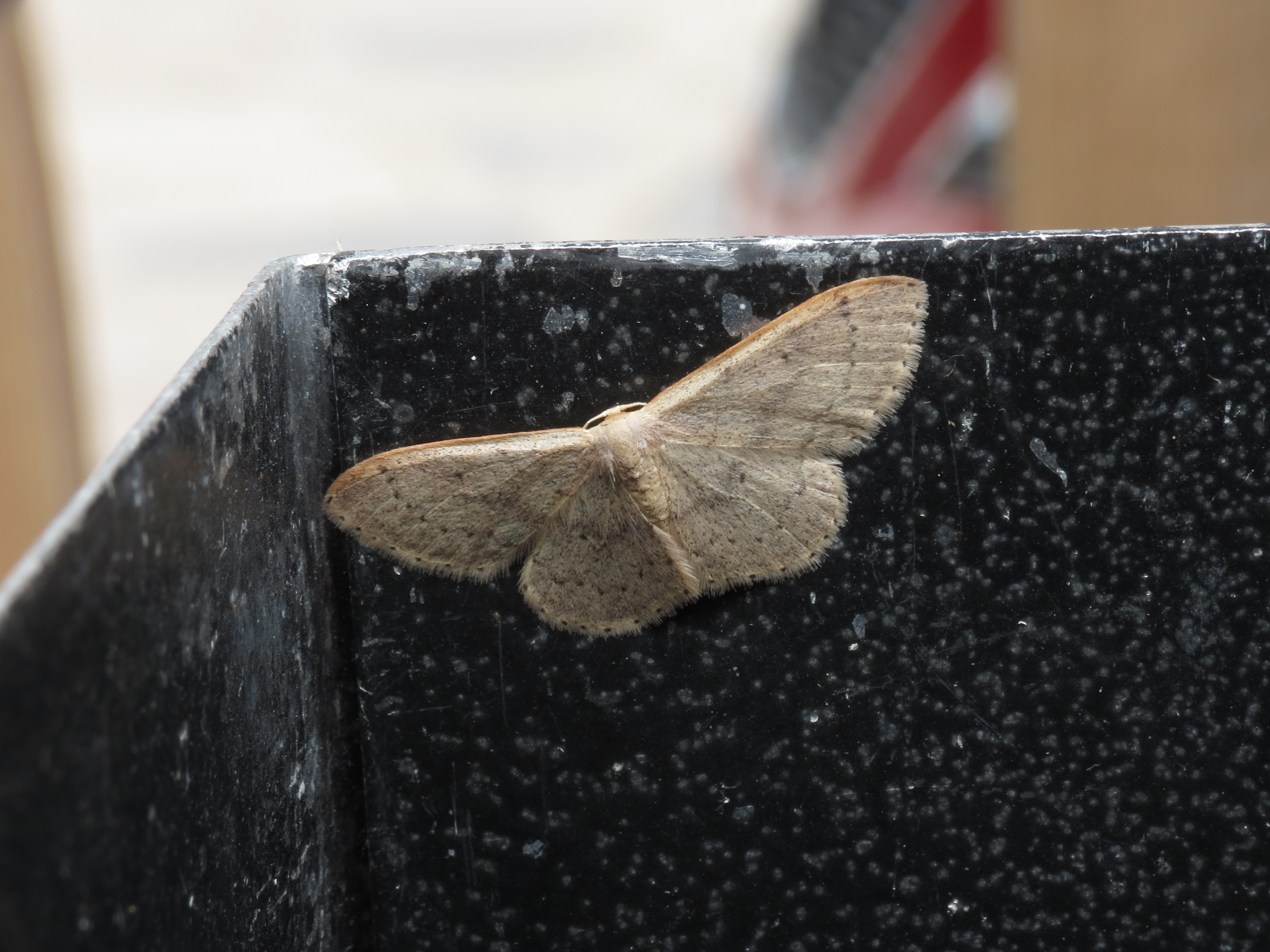

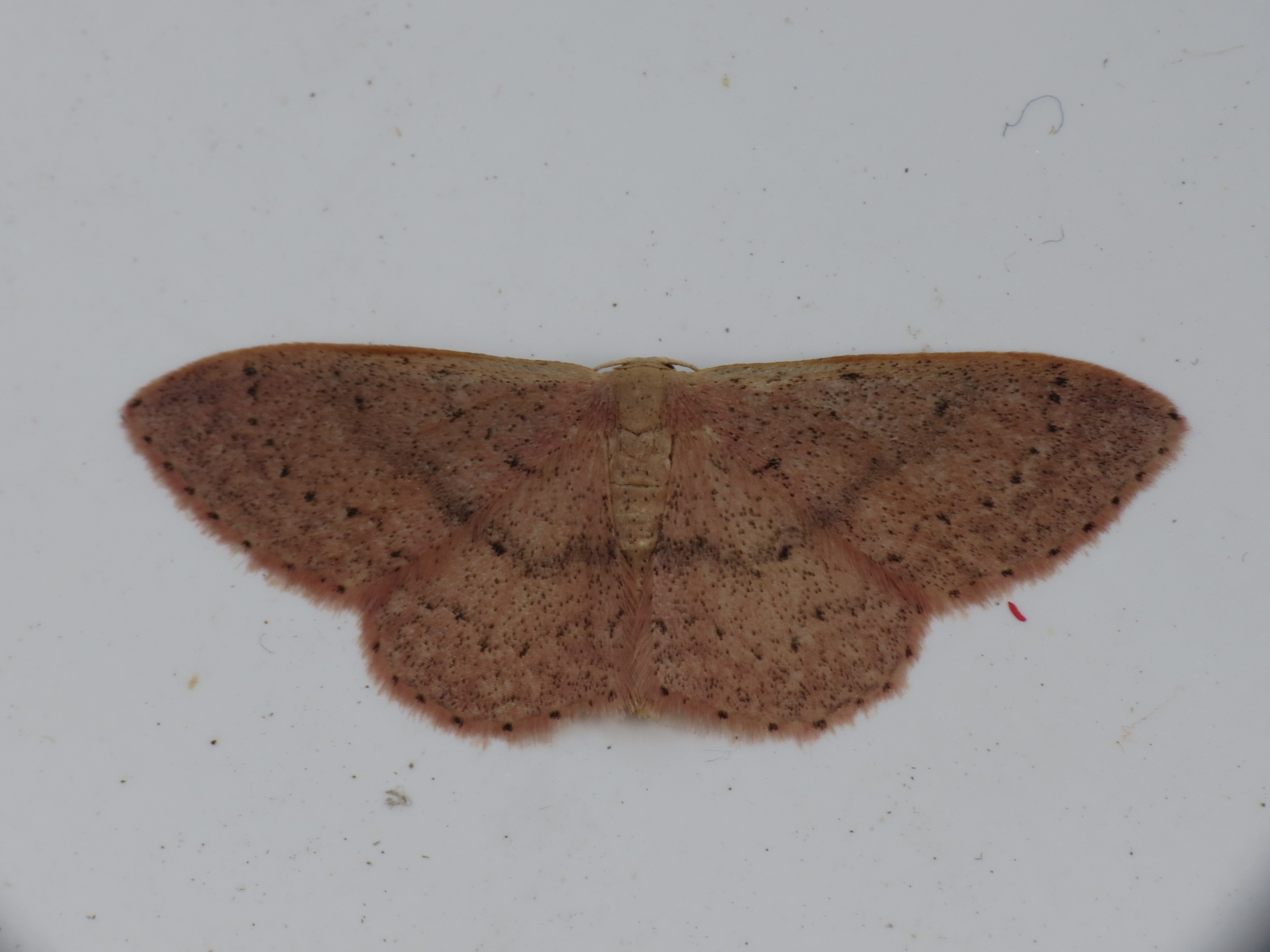

Scientific classification
- Kingdom: Animalia
- Phylum: Arthropoda
- Clade: Pancrustacea
- Class: Insecta
- Order: Lepidoptera
- Family: Geometridae
- Genus: Idaea
- Species: I. eugeniata

Binomial name
- Idaea eugeniata (Dardoin & Millière, 1870)

Synonyms
- Acidalia eugeniata Dardoin & Millière, 1870; Acidalia algeriaca Culot, 1917; Acidalia seeboldiata Rossler, 1877

= Idaea eugeniata =

Species of moth

Idaea eugeniata is a moth in the family Geometridae. It is found in Italy, France, Andorra, Spain, Portugal and North Africa.

The wingspan is 21–22 mm for males and 24–25 mm for females.

The larvae are polyphagous and have been recorded feeding on various herbaceous plants.

== Subspecies ==
- Idaea eugeniata eugeniata
- Idaea eugeniata algeriaca (Culot, 1917)
