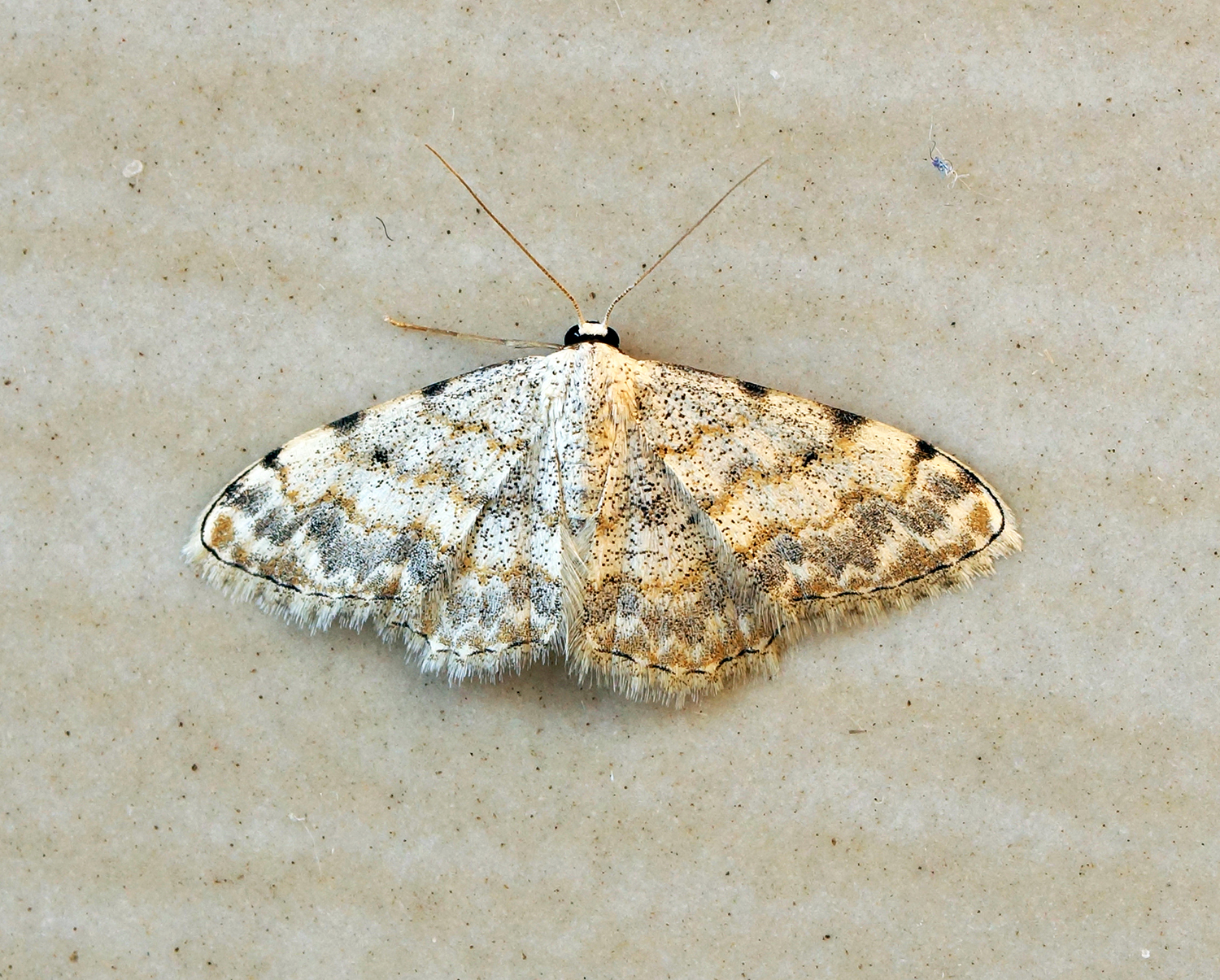

Scientific classification
- Kingdom: Animalia
- Phylum: Arthropoda
- Class: Insecta
- Order: Lepidoptera
- Family: Geometridae
- Genus: Scopula
- Species: S. submutata

Binomial name
- Scopula submutata (Treitschke, 1828)

Synonyms
- Idaea submutata Treitschke, 1828; Scopula nivellearia; Acidalia nivellearia Oberthur, 1922; Acidalia pseudhonestata Wehrli, 1926; Scopula syrilibanotica Wehrli, 1933; Acidalia gianellaria Turati, 1905; Acidalia submutaria Boisduval, 1840; Acidalia submutataria Herrich-Schaffer, 1847; Scopula submutata mudrica Koutsaftikis, 1973

= Scopula submutata =

Species of geometer moth in subfamily Sterrhinae

Scopula submutata, the Mediterranean lace border, is a moth of the family Geometridae. It is found in southern Europe, North Africa and the Near East. The habitat consists of open, dry grassland and rocky slopes.

The wingspan is 20–25 millimetres (0.79–0.98 in). There are two generations per year, with adults on wing from May to October.

The larvae feed on Thymus species and Origanum vulgare.

== Subspecies ==
- Scopula submutata submutata (south-eastern Europe)
- Scopula submutata gedrensis Hausmann, 2003 (Liguria, southern France)
- Scopula submutata nivellearia (Wehrli, 1926) (Mallorca, Spain, Portugal)
- Scopula submutata roseonitens Wagner, 1926 (Pyrenees)
- Scopula submutata submutulata Rebel, 1902
- Scopula submutata taftanica Brandt, 1941 (Iran)
- Scopula submutata taurilibanotica Wehrli, 1932 (Cyprus)
- Scopula submutata transcaspia Prout, 1935
