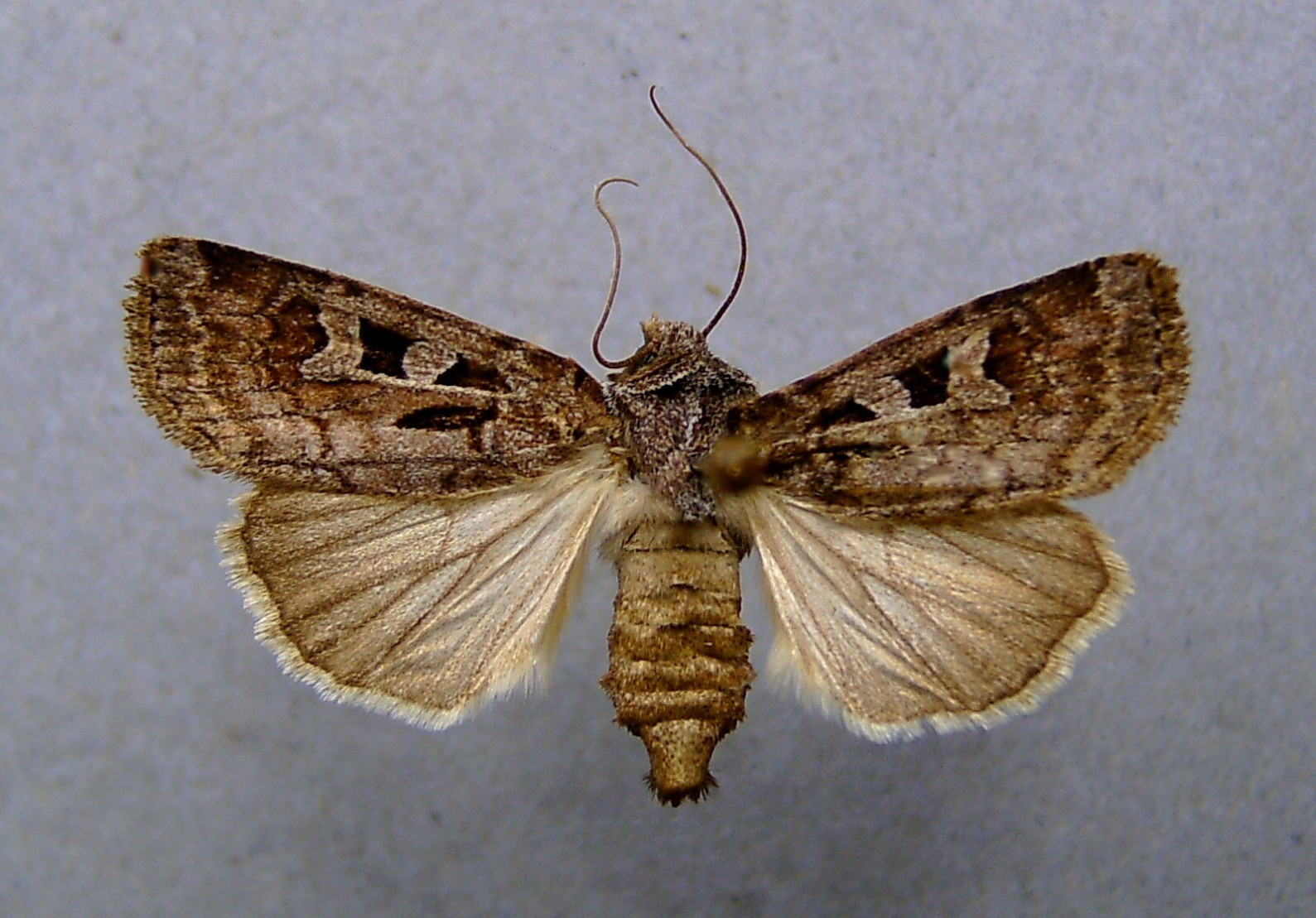

Scientific classification
- Kingdom: Animalia
- Phylum: Arthropoda
- Clade: Pancrustacea
- Class: Insecta
- Order: Lepidoptera
- Superfamily: Noctuoidea
- Family: Noctuidae
- Genus: Euxoa
- Species: E. recussa

Binomial name
- Euxoa recussa Hübner, 1817

Synonyms
- Agrotis recussa; Agrotis telifera; Agrotis transylvanica; Agrotis tetrastigma; Agrotis florigera; Noctua recussa

= Euxoa recussa =

Species of moth

Euxoa recussa is a moth of the family Noctuidae. The nominate form is found in mountainous areas in Southern Europe as well as the Alps. Euxoa recussa tetrastigma is found Northern Europe, east to Russia, Western Siberia, the Altai Mountains and Amur.

== Description ==
The wingspan is 32–40 mm. Warren states E. recussa Hbn. (= telifera Donz., florigera Ev., transylvanica H-Sch.) (6 k). Forewing purplish-grey with redbrown suffusion; claviform stigma large, blackish; orbicular and reniform brown with grey annuli; the cell black; no black streak below cell; hindwing luteous grey with the termen dark. Generally distributed in Europe, also found in Turkestan and Siberia.

== Subspecies ==
- Euxoa recussa recussa
- Euxoa recussa tetrastigma

== Biology ==
This moth flies from July to August depending on the location.

The larvae feed on various herbaceous plants and grasses.
