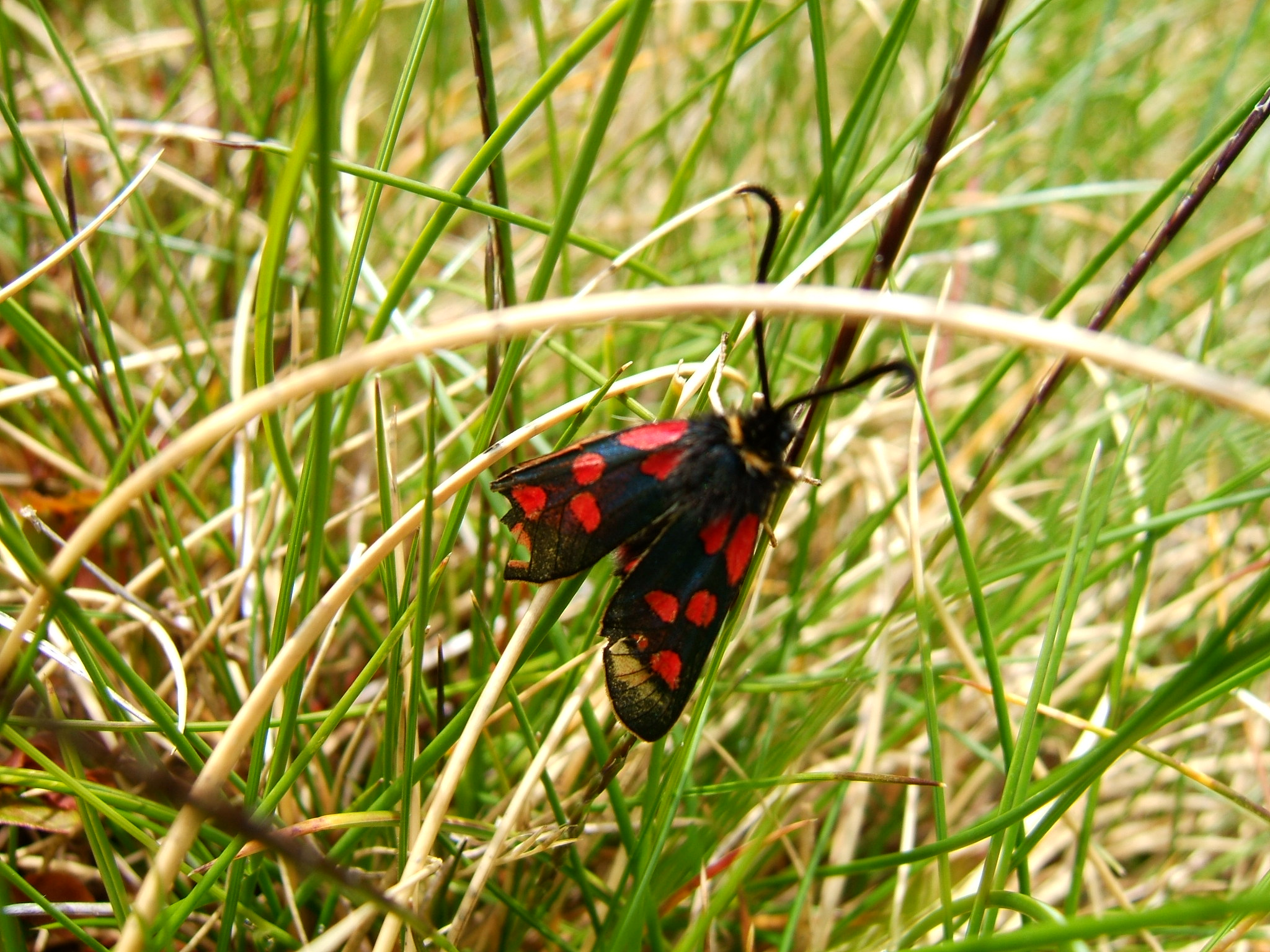
- Zygaena anthyllidis Gavarnie

Scientific classification
- Domain: Eukaryota
- Kingdom: Animalia
- Phylum: Arthropoda
- Class: Insecta
- Order: Lepidoptera
- Family: Zygaenidae
- Genus: Zygaena
- Species: Z. anthyllidis

Binomial name
- Zygaena anthyllidis Boisduval, 1828

Synonyms
- Zygaena erebus Meigen, 1829; Zygaena anthillidis Freyer, [1842]

= Zygaena anthyllidis =

Species of moth

Zygaena anthyllidis is a species of moth in the Zygaenidae family. It is found in France and Spain.

== Technical description and variation (Seitz) ==
Z. anthyllidis Boisd. (= erebus Meig.) . With pale collar and light-red belt. The wings strongly widened, and especially the 6 spots of forewing enlarged, being more or less quadrangular. Pyrenees. — ab. flava Oberth. is the yellow aberration. — In caucasica Stgr.-Reb.[now Zygaena armena ssp. caucasica Rebel, 1901 ] the pale collar is missing and the two distal spots touch each other or are confluent; from the Caucasus. — Larva yellow, with the head, thoracical legs and transverse bands black; on Trefoil. Pupa in a white ovate cocoon of which the frontal end is directed downwards (Oberthur). The wingspan is 30–38 mm.

== Biology ==
Adults are on wing in July and August. The larvae feed on Lotus (including Lotus alpinus), Coronilla, Trifolium, Anthyllis and other Fabaceae species. The larvae usually overwinter twice.
