= Coleophora graminicolella =

Scientific classification
- Kingdom: Animalia
- Phylum: Arthropoda
- Clade: Pancrustacea
- Class: Insecta
- Order: Lepidoptera
- Family: Coleophoridae
- Genus: Coleophora
- Species: C. graminicolella

Binomial name
- Coleophora graminicolella Heinemann, 1876

Species of moth

Coleophora graminicolella is a moth of the family Coleophoridae. It is found in Europe. It has been recorded from Andorra, Italy, Hungary, Bulgaria, Romania, Croatia, Czech Republic, Slovakia, Slovenia, Poland, Switzerland, the Netherlands, Germany, Denmark, Fennoscandia, Estonia, Latvia, Lithuania, southern Russia and the Near East.

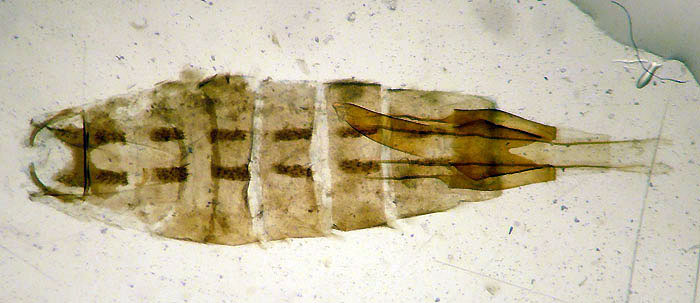

The wingspan is 15–17 mm.
