= Eupithecia alliaria =

Scientific classification
- Domain: Eukaryota
- Kingdom: Animalia
- Phylum: Arthropoda
- Class: Insecta
- Order: Lepidoptera
- Family: Geometridae
- Genus: Eupithecia
- Species: E. alliaria

Binomial name
- Eupithecia alliaria Staudinger, 1870

Species of moth

Eupithecia alliaria is a moth in the family Geometridae. It is found from France and the Iberian Peninsula east through south-central Europe to Russia and most of the Balkan Peninsula. It is also found in the Near East and North Africa.

The wingspan is 24–28 mm. Adults are on wing from May to August.

The larvae feed on Allium species.

== Subspecies ==
- Eupithecia alliaria alliaria
- Eupithecia alliaria notata Dietze, 1910
