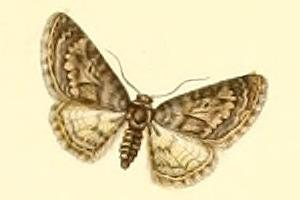

Scientific classification
- Domain: Eukaryota
- Kingdom: Animalia
- Phylum: Arthropoda
- Class: Insecta
- Order: Lepidoptera
- Family: Geometridae
- Genus: Eupithecia
- Species: E. cocciferata

Binomial name
- Eupithecia cocciferata Millière, 1864

Synonyms
- Eupithecia semitinctaria Mabille, 1867

= Eupithecia cocciferata =

Species of moth

Eupithecia cocciferata is a moth in the family Geometridae. It is found on the Iberian Peninsula, in France, Italy, Croatia, North Macedonia and on Corsica and Sardinia, as well as in North Africa.

== Gallery ==
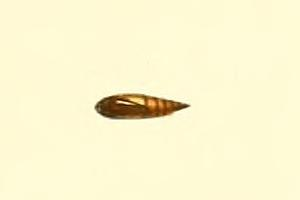
Pupa

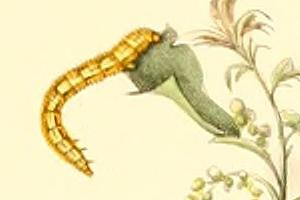
Larva

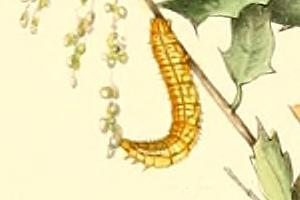
Larva
