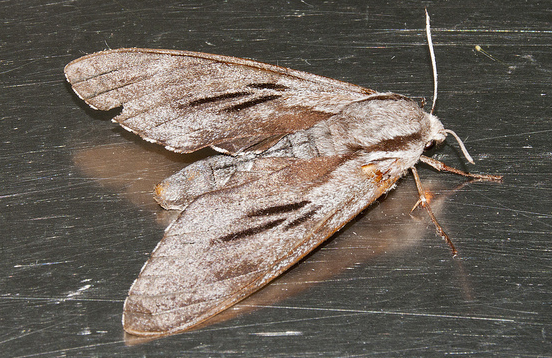

Scientific classification
- Kingdom: Animalia
- Phylum: Arthropoda
- Class: Insecta
- Order: Lepidoptera
- Family: Sphingidae
- Genus: Sphinx
- Species: S. maurorum

Binomial name
- Sphinx maurorum (Jordan, 1931)
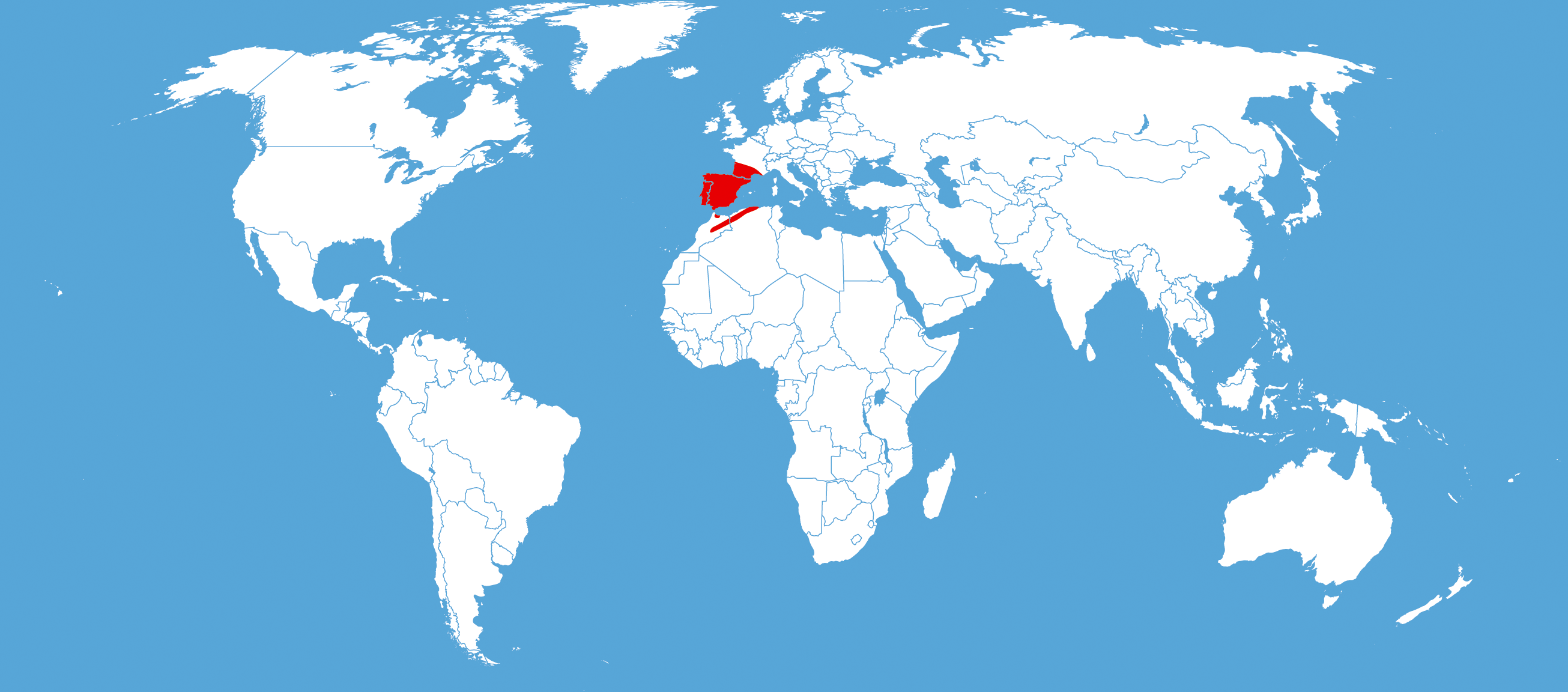
- Range

Synonyms
- Hyloicus maurorum; Hyloicus pinastri maurorum Jordan, 1931; Hyloicus pinastri massiliensis Jordan, 1931

= Sphinx maurorum =

Southern pine hawkmoth

Species of moth

Sphinx maurorum, the southern pine hawkmoth, is a moth of the family Sphingidae. The species was first described by Karl Jordan in 1931. It is found on the Iberian Peninsula, as well as in southern and central France as far north as Corrèze and as far south as the Atlas and Rif mountains of North Africa. There are also records from Corsica.

The wingspan is 70–80 mm. There are one to two generations per year. Mostly, there is one generation with adults on wing from mid-July to early August. In some years, adults are on wing from May to June and again in August.

The larvae feed on Pinus (especially Pinus halepensis and Pinus pinaster) and Cedrus species.
