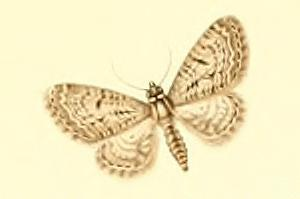

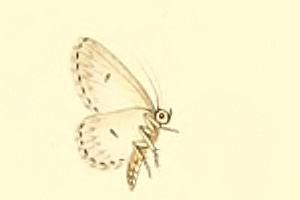

Scientific classification
- Kingdom: Animalia
- Phylum: Arthropoda
- Class: Insecta
- Order: Lepidoptera
- Family: Geometridae
- Genus: Eupithecia
- Species: E. massiliata

Binomial name
- Eupithecia massiliata Millière, 1865

Synonyms
- Eupithecia peyerimhoffata Milliere, 1870; Eupithecia atlanticata Pinker, 1969; Eupithecia atlanticata pinkeriata Moberg, 1983

= Eupithecia massiliata =

Species of moth

Eupithecia massiliata, the Epping pug, is a moth in the family Geometridae. The species was first described by Pierre Millière in 1865. It is found in Western/Southern Europe and North Africa. It was recorded from Epping Forest in Essex in 2002. It is suspected that the specimens were accidentally imported.

The wingspan is 18–19 mm.

The larvae feed on the flowers and leaves of oaks (Quercus), including holm oak (Quercus ilex) and cork oak (Quercus suber).
