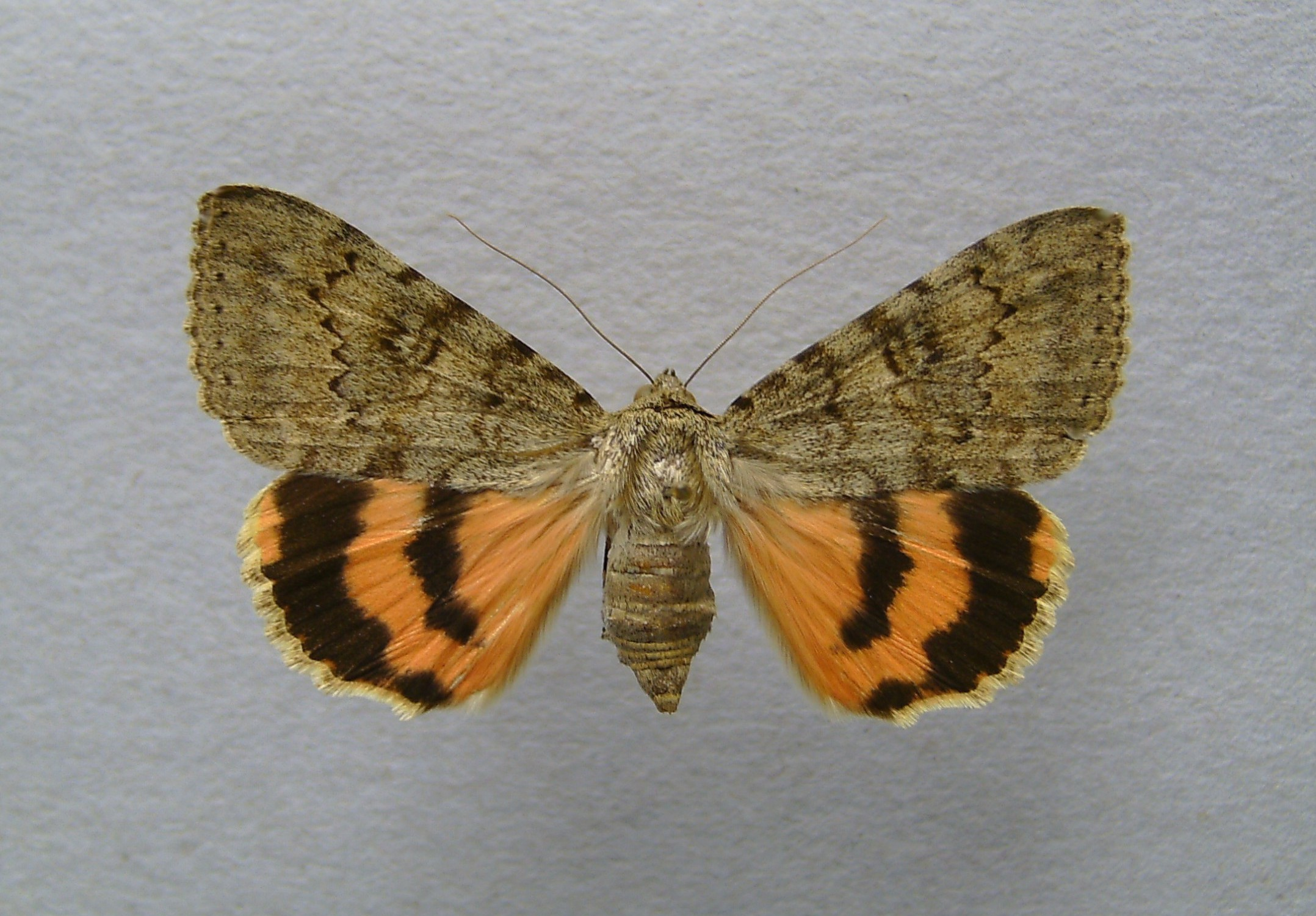

Scientific classification
- Kingdom: Animalia
- Phylum: Arthropoda
- Class: Insecta
- Order: Lepidoptera
- Superfamily: Noctuoidea
- Family: Erebidae
- Genus: Catocala
- Species: C. puerpera

Binomial name
- Catocala puerpera (Giorna, 1791)

Synonyms
- Phalaena puerpera Giorna, 1791; Phalaena amasia Esper, 1804; Catocala syriaca Schultz, 1909; Noctua pellex Hübner, [1809]; Catocala puerpera orientalis Staudinger, 1877; Catocala puerpera var. pallida Alphéraky, 1887; Catocala tarbagata Schultz, 1909; Catocala puerpera centralasiae Sheljuzhko, 1943

= Catocala puerpera =

Species of moth

Catocala puerpera is a moth of the family Erebidae first described by Michel-Esprit Giorna in 1791. It is found in Mediterranean and sub-Mediterranean areas of the Near East and Middle East and in North Africa.

There is one generation per year. Adults are on wing from May to June.

The larvae feed on Populus euphratica.

== Subspecies ==
- Catocala puerpera puerpera
- Catocala puerpera rosea Austaut, 1884 (Algeria)
- Catocala puerpera pallida Alphéraky, 1887 (Transcaspia, Xinjiang)
- Catocala puerpera syriaca Schultz, 1909 (Israel)
