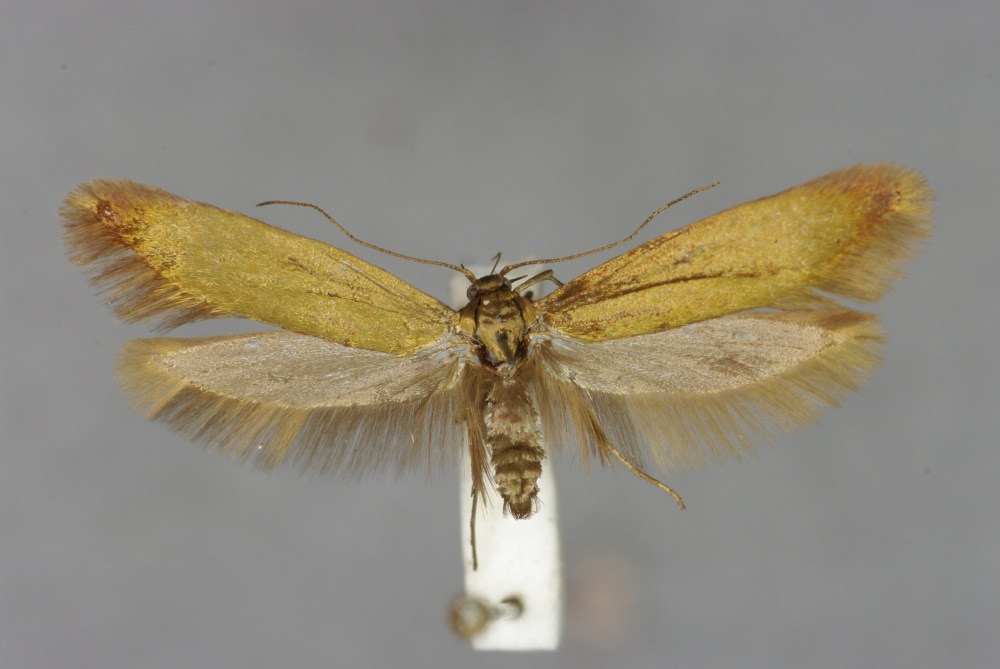

Scientific classification
- Domain: Eukaryota
- Kingdom: Animalia
- Phylum: Arthropoda
- Class: Insecta
- Order: Lepidoptera
- Family: Scythrididae
- Genus: Scythris
- Species: S. obscurella

Binomial name
- Scythris obscurella (Scopoli, 1763)

= Scythris obscurella =

Species of moth

Scythris obscurella is a moth belonging to the family Scythrididae. The species was first described by Giovanni Antonio Scopoli in 1763.

It is native to Eurasia.
