= Scopula asellaria =

Scientific classification
- Domain: Eukaryota
- Kingdom: Animalia
- Phylum: Arthropoda
- Class: Insecta
- Order: Lepidoptera
- Family: Geometridae
- Genus: Scopula
- Species: S. asellaria

Binomial name
- Scopula asellaria (Herrich-Schäffer, 1847)

Synonyms
- Acidalia asellaria Herrich-Schäffer, 1847; Glossotrophia asellaria; Glossotrophia asellaria Herrich-Schäffer, 1847; Glossotrophia dentatolineata Wehrli, 1926; Glossotrophia gerstbergeri Hausmann, 1993; Acidalia isabellaria Milliere, 1868; Glossotrophia lenzi Hausmann, 1993; Glossotrophia philipparia Prout, 1913; Acidalia romanaria Milliere, 1869; Glossotrophia tripolitana Turati, 1930

Species of geometer moth in subfamily Sterrhinae

Scopula asellaria is a moth of the family Geometridae. It was described by Gottlieb August Wilhelm Herrich-Schäffer in 1847. It is found in southern Europe and North Africa.

The larvae feed on the flowers of Silene species.

== Subspecies ==
- Scopula asellaria asellaria
- Scopula asellaria dentatolineata (Wehrli, 1926) (Spain)
- Scopula asellaria gerstbergeri (Hausmann, 1993) (Canary Islands)
- Scopula asellaria isabellaria (Milliére, 1868) (Spain)
- Scopula asellaria lenzi (Hausmann, 1993) (Morocco)
- Scopula asellaria philipparia (Prout, 1913) (Algeria)
- Scopula asellaria romanaria (Milliére, 1869) (Italy)
- Scopula asellaria tripolitana (Turati, 1930) (Libya)
