= Maurica =

Scientific classification
- Kingdom: Animalia
- Phylum: Arthropoda
- Clade: Pancrustacea
- Class: Insecta
- Order: Lepidoptera
- Superfamily: Noctuoidea
- Family: Erebidae
- Subfamily: Arctiinae
- Subtribe: Spilosomina
- Genus: Maurica de Freina & Witt, 1984

Type species
- Trichosoma breveti Oberthür, 1882

Genus of moths

Maurica is a genus of moths in the family Erebidae from north-western Africa.

The genus was erected by Josef J. de Freina and Thomas Joseph Witt in 1984. Originally one species more was included into the genus, M. bellieri (Lederer, 1855) from the Near East; but later it was returned into the genus Ocnogyna.

== Species ==
- Maurica breveti (Oberthür, 1882)
  - Maurica breveti powelli (Oberthür, 1910)
- Maurica joiceyi (Talbot, 1928)
  - Maurica joiceyi chneouri (Rungs, 1951)
  - Maurica joiceyi monticola (Reisser, 1934)
