= Hermann Loew =

German entomologist (1807–1879)

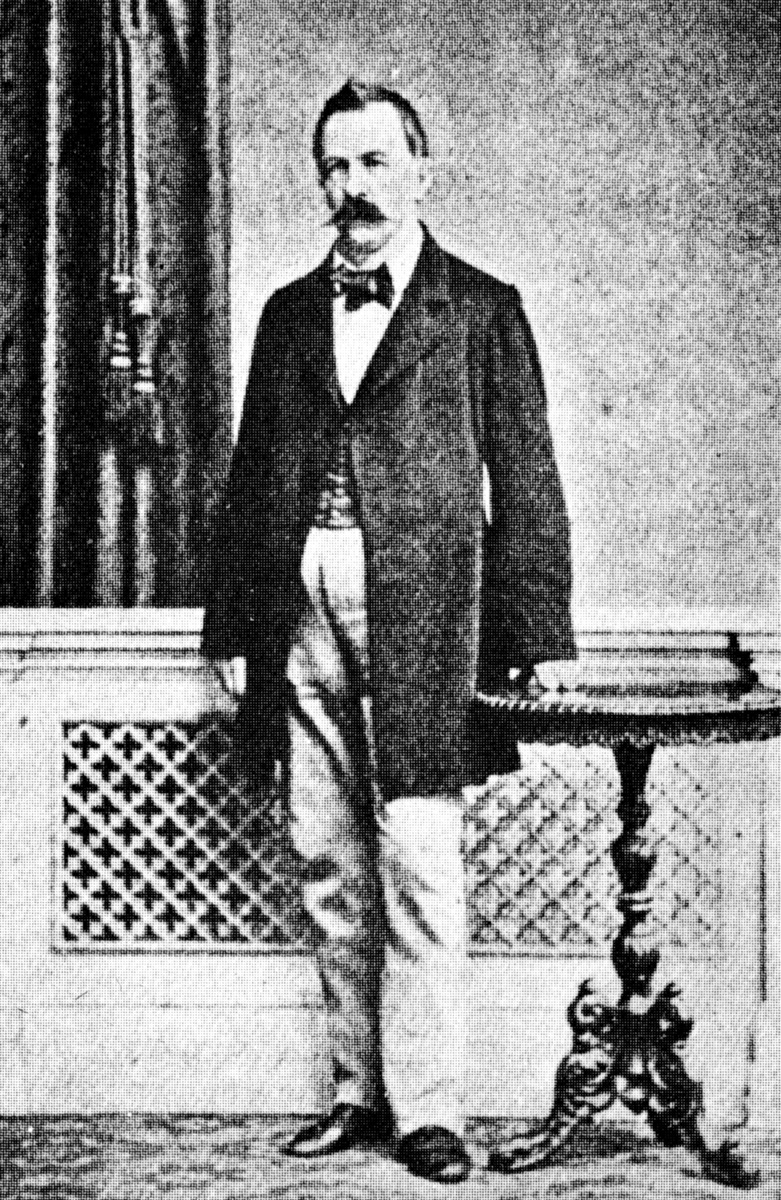
Hermann Loew.

Friedrich Hermann Loew (19 July 1807 – 21 April 1879) was a German entomologist who specialised in the study of Diptera, an order of insects including flies, mosquitoes, gnats and midges. He described many world species and was the first specialist to work on the Diptera of the United States.

== Biography ==
=== Early years ===
Hermann Loew was born in Weissenfels, Saxony a short distance south of Halle (Germany). The Loew family, though not wealthy, was well-placed. Loew's father was a functionary for the Department of Justice of the Duchy of Saxony who later became a Geheimer Regierungsrath of Prussia. Between 1817 and 1829 Loew attended first the Convent School of Rossleben, then the University of Halle-Wittenberg, graduating in mathematics, philology and natural history.

=== Teacher, tutor and husband ===
Recognizing his abilities as a mathematician, the university, on his graduation, appointed him as a lecturer in the same subjects. In 1830 he went to Berlin and gave lessons in different higher grade schools including the Kadetten-Schule military school. Here he was private tutor to Prince Biron heir to the Duchy of Courland and Semigallia and the young Friedrich Wilhelm Ernst Albrecht von Graefe (1828–1870) later one of the most famous oculists of all times. In 1834 Loew was appointed superior teacher (Oberlehrer) at the Friedrich-Wilhelm-Gymnasium in Posen, known today as St. John Cantius High School in Poznań, Poland where he taught mathematics and natural history. In the same year, he married the daughter of senior preacher Ehricht, a favourite sermoniser. Several of Loew's pupils at Posen became scientific celebrities, the most notable being the philosopher Kuno Fischer (1824–1907) and the mathematicians Leo Königsberger (1837–1921) and Lazarus Immanuel Fuchs (1835–1902). That they became such, gifted though they were, must have been due to Loew's extraordinary abilities and his popularity with students.

=== East Asia ===
In 1841-2 Loew accompanied Heinrich Kiepert (1818–1899), a celebrated geographer, and August Schoenborn to the Near East. The results of this trip were later partly communicated to Hermann Carl Conrad Burmeister (1807–1892), Philipp Christoph Zeller and to Alexander von Humboldt (1769–1859), but the remainder (the greatest part), were used in Loew's own later publications. August Schoenborn, philologist and geographer, was also a professor at the Friedrich-Wilhelm-Gymnasium in Posen, and author of Latin school books. He eventually became Loew's brother-in-law. Humboldt was of course the author of the chattily readable "Kosmos", an account of the visible universe, and the most celebrated German naturalist explorer of his day. Many other countries were visited en route including places in the Ottoman Empire.

=== Politics ===
In 1848 Loew was elected to the German Parliament in Frankfurt am Main. Elected to the first German Parliament when 40 years old, Loew resisted the separatist longings of the Poles from his outpost (Posen) near the frontier of Poland. He belonged to Heinrich von Gagern's Imperial Party, a grouping which fostered Liberalism in Germany and pursued a policy of fusion for the German states.

=== Tragedy, Disappointment and a return to teaching ===
Disillusioned by the failure to realise German unity and distressed by the death of his 21-year-old daughter from the plague, in 1850, Loew left politics. In 1850 he was appointed director of the royal Realschule Mesritz (a Realschule is a school emphasizing technical and scientific studies). Due to the efforts of Loew, the Mesritz Realschule was later to become a gymnasium (a more classical sort of school, though still scientific). While at Mesritz Loew gave up politics so as not to be in conflict with the educational department, and resisted offers of a seat in the Prussian Landtag (Federal state parliament) for the district of Mesritz-Bomst.

=== Bad health ===
Severe health problems between 1851 and 1854 forced retirement. In 1868 he received a pension and took up the study of Diptera full-time after moving to Guben, Prussia. Here he worked incessantly on Diptera.

In 1870 he was elected city councillor and vice-president of the city council in Guben and held a seat in the legislature in Berlin for the Sorau-Guben district between 1873 and 1876.

=== Last years ===
The imminent end of Loew was signaled on a summer holiday in Blankenburg in Thuringia when he had a paralytic stroke after which he sought treatment in the Diaconissen-Haus in Halle, Saxony, and died on 21 April 1879. Only three of his seven children survived him. His obituary in the Vassisches Zeitung described him as a "distinguished pedagogue, naturalist pioneer of German Unity".

=== Loew's character ===
A Lutheran protestant, Loew's motto was "Gott Helfe" – God helps or God may help. Loew was an obsessive worker. Something of his nature can be judged from his refusing to eat warm food to pay off the loans incurred during his education, and from his extraordinary calligraphy, with its machine-like precision. There is never any difficulty with reading a Loew label, characteristically justified to the side margins. Loew shared such personality traits with the neurotically obsessive fellow entomologist Alexander Henry Haliday.

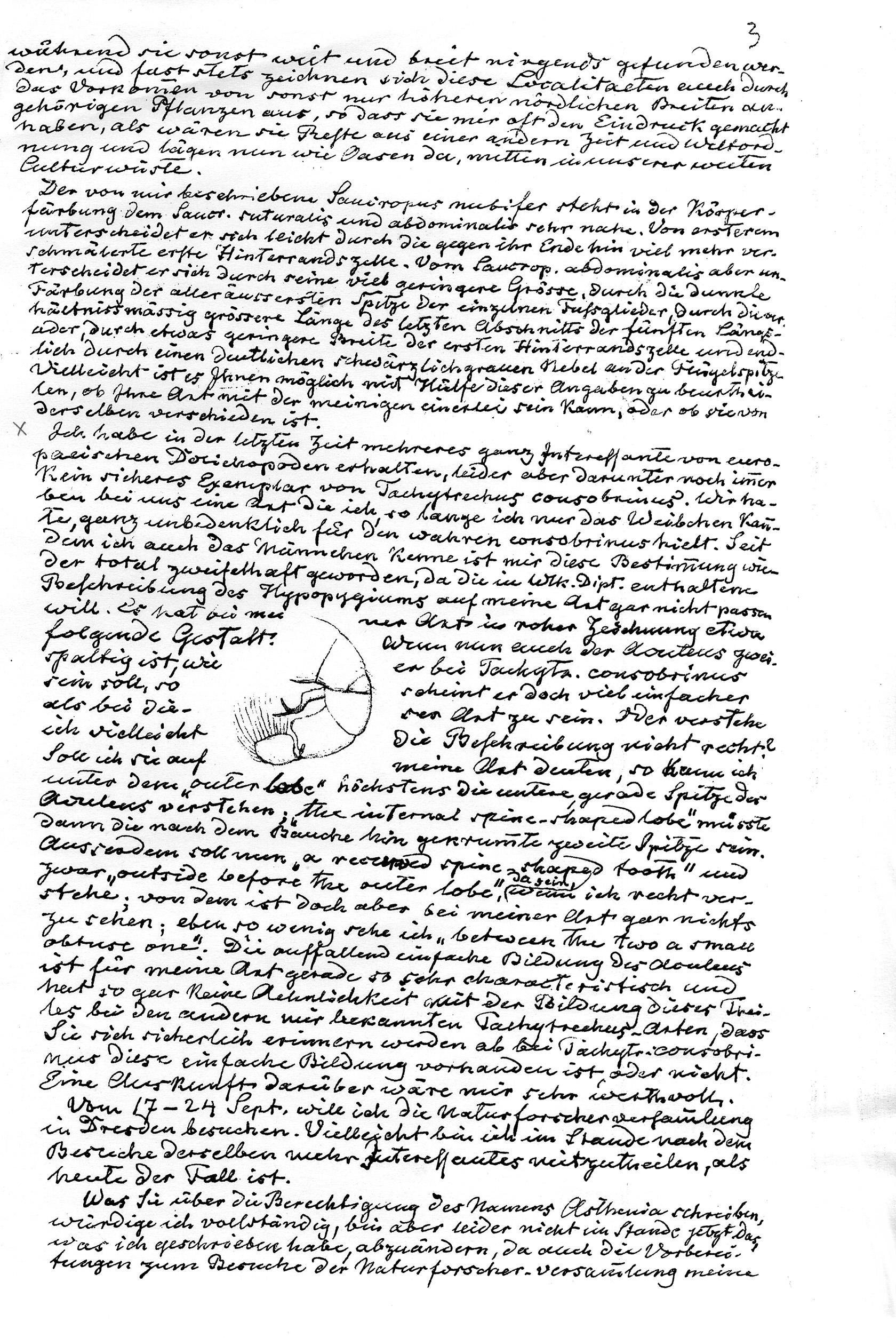
Letter from Hermann Loew to A.H.Haliday

== Work ==
Hermann Loew was undoubtedly the dominant dipterist from the 1840s and the following three decades. Although predominantly a describer — delineating the taxonomically useful characters of more than 4,000 species mainly from the Palaearctic and North America, but also from the Afrotropics and the Far East — Loew made important contributions to higher taxonomy.

Hermann Loew is best known with regard to Diptera paleontology for his work with Baltic amber inclusions. He was the first investigator to seriously interest himself in the Diptera of amber and his 1850 work on the amber Diptera from the Baltic region was the major foundation for all future study on amber Diptera.

=== Loew's collections ===
Loew's personal Baltic amber collection is in the Natural History Museum, London. Types of fossil species based on material in the Klebs Collection are now in Göttingen. Fossil types based on specimens from the Berendt collection are in the Paläontologisches Museum, in the present day the Museum für Naturkunde (the Natural History Museum of Berlin). Types of recent Diptera are in the Museum für Naturkunde, Berlin, except for the North American species, which are in the Museum of Comparative Zoology, Cambridge, Massachusetts, the South African material, which is in the University of Halle, Zoological Museum, and the Alaskan species, which are in the Finnish Museum of Natural History in Helsinki. Other Loew specimens, including types, are in the Natural History Museum in Stockholm and in the Natural History Museum, London (Lepidoptera from Turkey). Small numbers of specimens are in the Natural History Museum in Dublin, Ireland and in the Hope Department of Entomology, University of Oxford.

=== The Loew collection in the Museum für Naturkunde, Berlin ===
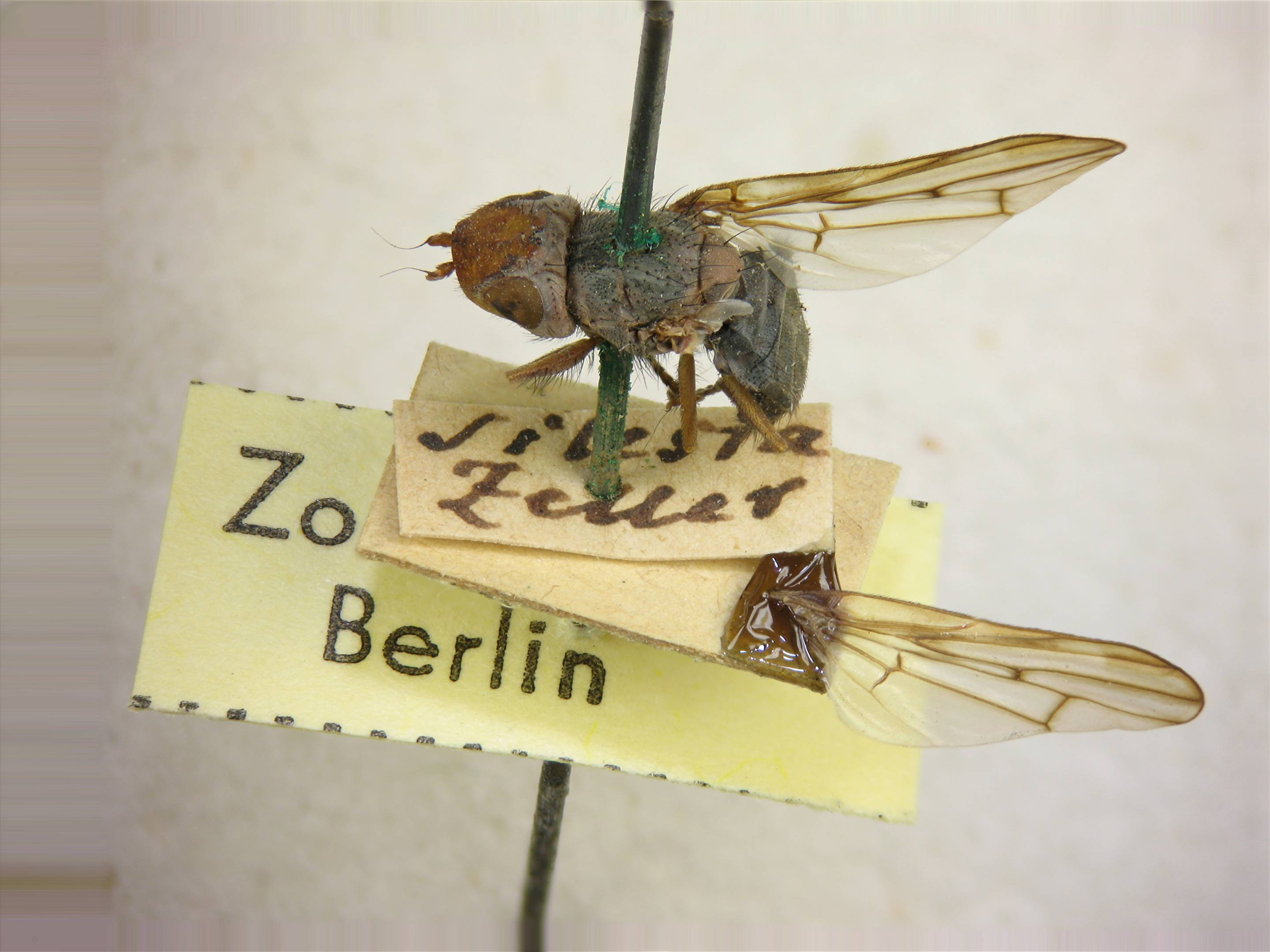
Specimen of Otites bucephala in the Loew collection, Museum für Naturkunde

Aside from Diptera collected by Loew himself, mostly from the area around Posen and Meseritz (then in Prussia but now in Poland) and elsewhere in what is now Germany. The collection contains much material collected by other, mostly anonymous German entomologists from Germany and other parts of Europe. There is also material collected in (not by Loew): "Brasilien, Bismark Arch[ipelago] Ralum, Bogota, Columbien, Chile, Venezuela, Cuba, Carolina, Chile, Sumatra, Soekaranda, Montivide[o], Askhaabad, Transcaspian, Amboine, Klein-Asien-Asia Minor, Arab fel., Andalusia, Griechenland, Santiago, Lapland, N. Kamerun Cameroons, Kaukasus, Texas, Aegyptea". In these respects the collection, though impressive in most respects differs little from that of other contemporary assemblages. The collection, however, contains:

- Specimens sent by Alexander Henry Haliday which was either type (in the modern sense) or which he considered representative of his own taxa
- Specimens sent by Alexander Henry Haliday comp. exemp. Linnaeus or comp. exemp. Meigen (following Halidays examination of these collections in London (Linnaeus) and Paris (Meigen))
- Specimens sent by Johan Wilhelm Zetterstedt either type or representative of Zetterstedt taxa
- Specimens sent by Rasmus Carl Stæger illustrative of Stæger's description
- Specimens sent by Camillo Rondani ‘comparito con il tipo’
- Synonymic notes, either on or with pinned specimens

== Insects named for Loew ==
- Trichosoma loewii Zeller, 1846 (Lepidoptera) (now Ocnogyna loewii)
- Albulina loewii (Zeller, 1847) — large jewel blue (Lepidoptera)
- Scymnus loewii Mulsant, 1850 — Loew's ladybird (Coleoptera)
- Aleuropteryx loewii Klapálek, 1894 (Neuroptera)
- Acrotelus loewii Reuter, 1885 (Heteroptera, Miridae) — renamed to Acrotelus caspicus
- Damioseca loewii Carvalho
- Phytomyza loewii Hendel, 1923 (Agromyzidae)
- Meromacrus loewii (Williston, 1892) (Syrphidae)
- Trapezostigma loewii (Kaup, 1866) (Odonata, Libellulidae) — common glider dragonfly
- Pterophorus loewii (Zeller, 1847) (now Stenoptilia zophodactylus) (Lepidoptera, Pterophoridae)
- Plejus loewii — Loew's blue plejus (Lepidoptera)
- Argyra loewii Kowarz, 1879 (Dolichopodidae)
- Ocnaea loewi Cole, 1919 (Acroceridae)
- Campiglossa loewiana (Hendel,1927) [=Paroxyna loewiana] (Tephritidae)
- Loewiella Williston (Asilidae)
- Loewia Egger, 1856 (Tachinidae)
- Muscina angustifrons, 1858 (Muscidae)

== Works ==
- 1837: Dipterologische Notizen. In: Wiener Entomologische Monatsschrift. Band 1, S. 1–10, Wien 1837.
- 1840: Über die im Großherzogtum Posen aufgefundenen Zweiflügler [Reprint: Bemerkungen über die in der Posener Gegend einheimischen Arten mehrerer Zweiflügler-Gattungen. Posen, 1840, S. 1–40]. In: Isis. S. 512–584, Jena 1840.
- 1844: Beschreibung einiger neuer Gattungen der europäischen Dipterenfauna. In: Stettiner entomologische Zeitung. Band 5, S. 114–130, 154–173, 165–168, Szczecin (= Stettin) 1844.
- 1844: Dioctria hercyniae, eine neue Art. In: Stettiner entomologische Zeitung. Band 5, S. 381–382, Szczecin (= Stettin) 1844.
- 1847: Dipterologisches. In: Stettiner entomologische Zeitung. Band 8, S. 368–376, Szczecin (= Stettin) 1847.
- 1847: Über die europäischen Raubfliegen (Diptera, Asilica). In: Linnaea entomologica. Band 2, S. 384–568, 585–591, Szczecin (= Stettin) und Berlin 1847.
- 1847: Nomina systematica generum dipterorum, tam viventium quam fossilium, secundum ordinem alphabeticum disposita, adjectis auctoribus, libris in quibus reperiuntur, anno editionis, etymologia et familiis ad quas pertinent. In: Agassiz: Nomenclator zoologicus. Solothurn 1847, Fasc. 9/10
- 1848: Ueber die europäischen Arten der Gattung Eumerus. In: Stettiner entomologische Zeitung. Band 9, S. 118–128, Szczecin (= Stettin) 1848.
- 1848: Ueber die europäischen Raubfliegen (Diptera, Asilica). In: Linnaea entomologica. Band 3, S. 386–495, Szczecin (= Stettin) und Berlin 1848.
- 1849: Ueber die europäischen Raubfliegen (Diptera, Asilica). In: Linnaea entomologica. Band 4, S. 1–155, Szczecin (= Stettin) und Berlin 1849.
- 1850: Ueber den Bernstein und die Bernsteinfauna. In: Programm K. Realschule zu Meseritz 1850. S. 1–4, 1–44, Berlin 1850.
- 1851: Bemerkungen über die Familie Asiliden. In: Programm K. Realschule zu Meseritz 1851. S. 1–22, Berlin 1851.
- 1851: Nachträge zu den europäischen Asiliden. In: Linnaea entomologica. Band 5, S. 407–416, Szczecin (= Stettin) und Berlin 1851.
- 1852: Diagnosen der Dipteren von Peter's Reise in Mossambique. In: Bericht über die Verhandlungen der Königlichen Preussischen Akademie der Wissenschaften zu Berlin 1852. S. 658–661, Berlin 1852.
- 1853: Neue Beiträge zur Kenntnis der Dipteren. Erster Beitrag. In: Programm K. Realschule zu Meseritz 1853. S. 1–37, Berlin 1853.
- 1854: Neue Beiträge zur Kenntnis der Dipteren. Zweiter Beitrag. In: Programm K. Realschule zu Meseritz 1854. S. 1–24, Berlin 1854.
- 1855: Vier neue griechische Diptera. In: Stettiner entomologische Zeitung. Band 16, S. 39–41, Szczecin (= Stettin) 1855.
- 1856: Diptera. In: Rosenhauer: Die Thiere Anadalusien nach dem Resultate einer Reise zusammengestellt. Blaesing, Erlangen 1856.
- 1856: Neue Beiträge zur Kenntnis der Dipteren. Vierter Beitrag. In: Programm K. Realschule zu Meseritz 1856. S. 1–57, Berlin 1856.
- 1857: Dipterologische Mittheilungen. In: Wiener Entomologische Monatsschrift. Band 1, S. 33–56, S. 36–37, Wien 1857.
- 1857: Dipterologische Notizen. In: Wiener Entomologische Monatsschrift. Band 1, S. 1–10, Wien 1857.
- 1857: Dischistus multisetosus und Saropogon aberrans, zwei neue europäische Dipteren. In: Stettiner entomologische Zeitung. Band 18, S. 17–20, Szczecin (= Stettin) 1857.
- 1858: Bericht über die neueren Erscheinungen auf dem Gebiete der Dipterologie. In: Berliner entomologische Zeitschrift. Band 2, S. 325–349, Berlin 1858.
- 1858: Beschreibung einiger japanischer Dipteren. In: Wiener Entomologische Monatsschrift. Band 2, S. 100–112, Wien 1858.
- 1858: Bidrag till kännendomen om Afrikas Diptera. In: Öfvers. Svenska Vet. — Akad. Förhandl. Band 14(9), 1857, S. 337–383 (342–367).
- 1859: Bidrag till kännendomen om Afrikas Diptera. In: Öfvers. Svenska Vet. — Akad. Förhandl. Band 15, 1858, S. 335–341 (337–339).
- 1859: Ueber die europäischen Helomyzidae und die in Schlesien vorkommenden Arten derselben. In: Linnaea entomologica. Band 13, 1859, S. 3–80. (online)
- 1860: Die Dipteren-Fauna Südafrikas. Erste Abtheilung. In: Abhandlungen des Naturwissenschaftlichen Vereins für Sachsen und Thüringen. Band 2, 1858–1861, S. 56–402, S. 128–244, Halle.
- 1860: Drei von Herrn Dr.Friedr.Stein in Dalmatien entdeckte Dipteren. In: Wiener Entomologische Monatsschrift. Band 4, S. 20–24, Wien 1860.
- 1861: Diptera aliquot in insula Cuba collecta. In: Wiener Entomologische Monatsschrift. Band 5, S. 33–43, Wien 1861.
- 1861: Die europäischen Arten der Gattung Stenopogon. In: Wiener Entomologische Monatsschrift. Band 5, S. 8–13, Wien 1861.
- 1862: Diptera Americae septentrionalis indigena. In: Berliner entomologische Zeitschrift. Band 6, S. 185–232, S. 188–193, Berlin 1862.
- 1862: Diptera In: Zweiflügler In: Wilhelm C. H. Peters: Reise nach Mossambique auf Befehl Sr Maj. des Königs Friedrich Wilhelm IV. in den Jahren 1842–1848 ausgeführt. 5. Insecten u. Amphibien. Reimer, Berlin 1862.
- 1862: Ueber einige bei Varna gefangene Dipteren. In: Wiener Entomologische Monatsschrift. Band 6, S. 161–175, Wien 1862.
- 1862: Ueber griechische Dipteren. In: Berliner entomologische Zeitschrift. Band 6, S. 69–89, Berlin 1862.
- 1863: Enumeratio dipterorum quae C.Tollin ex Africa merdionali (Orangestaat, Bloemfontein) misit. In: Wiener Entomologische Monatsschrift. Band 7, S. 9–16, Wien 1863.
- 1865: Ueber einige bei Kutais in Imeretien gefangene Dipteren. In: Berliner entomologische Zeitschrift. Band 9, S. 234–242, Berlin 1865.
- 1866: Diptera Americae septentrionalis indigena. In: Berliner entomologische Zeitschrift. Band 10, S. 1–54, S. 15–37, Berlin 1866.
- 1868: Cilicische Dipteren und einige mit ihnen concurrirende Arten. In: Berliner entomologische Zeitschrift. Band 12, S. 369–386, Berlin 1868.
- 1869: Beschreibungen europäischer Dipteren. Systematische Beschreibung der bekannten europäischen zweiflügligen Insecten von Johann Wilhelm Meigen. Band I. Halle 1869, S. 61–121.
- 1870: Diptera. In: L. von Heyden: Entomologische Reise nach dem südlichen Spanien der Sierra Guadarrrama und Sierra Morena, Portugal und den Cantabrischen Gebirge mit Beschreibung der neuen Arten. Berlin 1870, S. 211–212.
- 1870: Lobioptera speciosa Meig. und decora nov.sp.. In: Zeitschrift für die gesamte Naturwissenschaft. Band 35, S. 9–14, Braunschweig, Berlin-Dahlem 1870.
- 1870: Ueber die von Herrn Dr.G.Seidlitz in Spanien gesammelten Dipteren. In: Berliner entomologische Zeitschrift. Band 14, S. 137–144, Berlin 1870.
- 1871: Beschreibungen europäischer Dipteren. Systematische Beschreibung der bekannten europäischen zweiflügligen Insecten von Johann Wilhelm Meigen. Band II. Halle 1871, S. 70–196.
- 1872: Diptera Americae septentrionalis indigena. In: Berliner entomologische Zeitschrift. Band 16, S. 49–115, S. 62–74, Berlin 1872.
- 1873: Bemerkungen über die von Herrn F. Walker im 5. Bande des Entomologist beschriebenen ägyptischen und arabischen Dipteren. In: Zeitschrift für die gesamte Naturwissenschaft. Band 42, S. 105–109, Braunschweig, Berlin-Dahlem 1873.
- 1873: Beschreibungen europäischer Dipteren. Systematische Beschreibung der bekannten europäischen zweiflügligen Insecten von Johann Wilhelm Meigen. Band III. Halle 1873, S. 120–144.
- 1874: Diptera nova a Hug.Theod.Christopho collecta. In: Zeitschrift für die gesamte Naturwissenschaft. Band 43, Neue Folge Band 9, S. 413–420, Braunschweig, Berlin-Dahlem 1874.
- 1874: Neue nordamerikanische Dasypogonina. In: Berliner entomologische Zeitschrift. 18, S. 353–377, Berlin 1874.
- 1874: Ueber die Arten der Gattung Blepharotes Westw. In: Zeitschrift für die gesamte Naturwissenschaft. Band 10, 44, S. 71–75, Braunschweig, Berlin-Dahlem 1874.
- 1881: Stein: Die Löw’sche Dipteren-Sammlung. In: Stettiner Entomologische Zeitung. Band 42, S. 489–491, Szczecin (= Stettin) 1881.

Longer list of works see the references in Sabrosky's Family Group Names in Diptera and also the German version of this page.
