= Jean Baptiste Boisduval =

French lepidopterist (1799–1879)

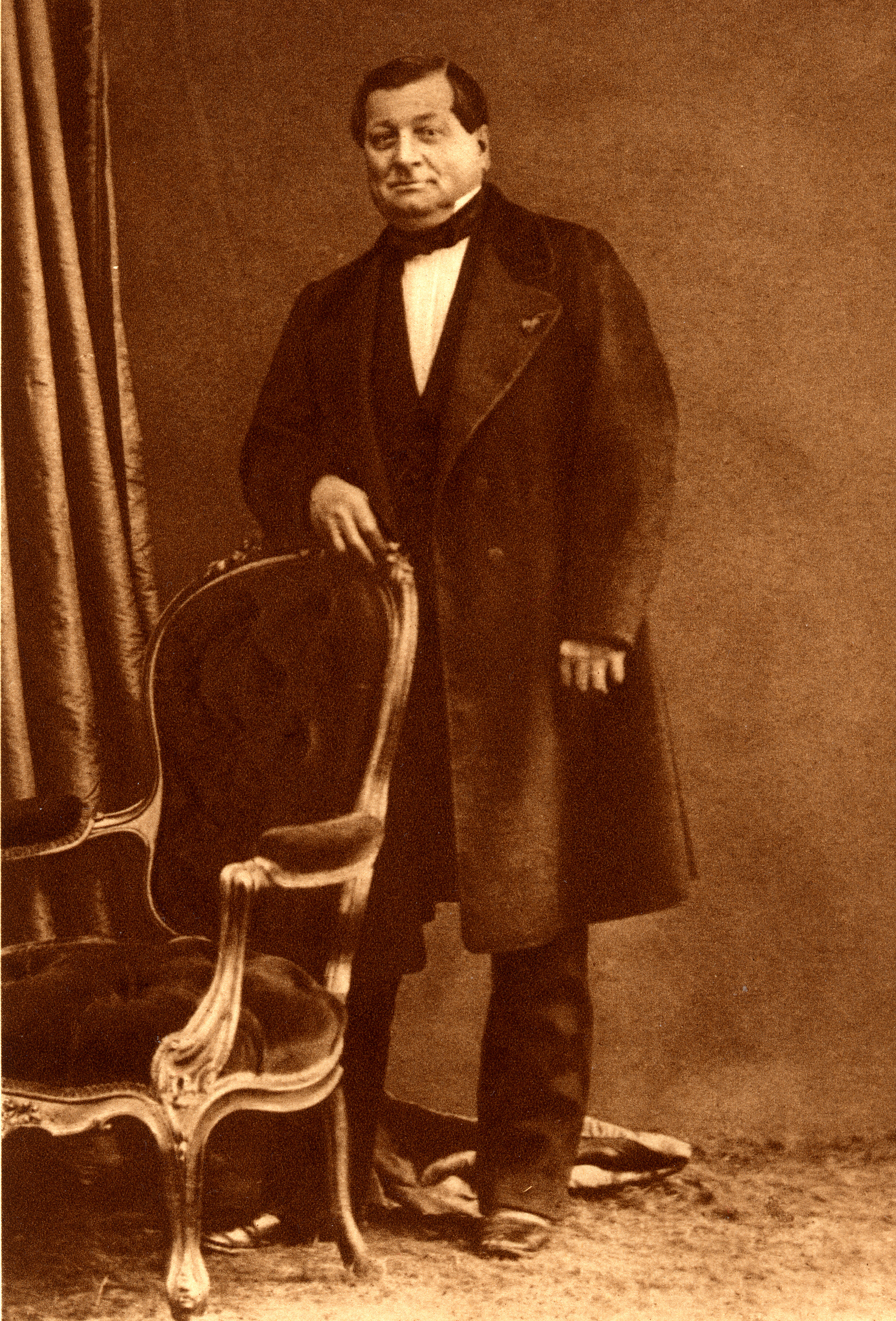
- Jean-Baptiste Alphonse Déchauffour de Boisduval in 1874
- Born: 24 June 1799; Ticheville, Lower Normandy, France
- Died: 30 December 1879 (aged 80); France
- Scientific career
- Fields: Lepidoptery; Botany
- Workplaces: Société entomologique de France
- Author abbrev. (botany): Boisd.
- Author abbrev. (zoology): Boisduval

Jean Baptiste Alphonse Déchauffour de Boisduval (24 June 1799 – 30 December 1879) was a French lepidopterist, botanist, and physician.

He was one of the most celebrated lepidopterists of France, and was the co-founder of the Société entomologique de France. While best known abroad for his work in entomology, he started his career in botany, collecting a great number of French plant specimens and writing broadly on the topic throughout his career, including the textbook Flores française in 1828. Early in his career, he was interested in Coleoptera and allied himself with both Jean Théodore Lacordaire and Pierre André Latreille. He was the curator of the Pierre Françoise Marie Auguste Dejean collection in Paris and described many species of beetles, as well as butterflies and moths, resulting from the voyages of the Astrolabe, the expedition ship of Jean-François de Galaup, comte de La Pérouse and the Coquille, that of Louis Isidore Duperrey.

He left Paris, where he had lived for nearly 60 years, in 1875, to retire in Ticheville near his family. His brother was Adolphe-Armand d'Echauffour de Boisduval (September 26, 1801 – March 1, 1842), a doctor, naturalist, and health officer in their native Ticheville.

Boisduval's Elateridae are in the Natural History Museum, London and the types of Curculionidae in Brussels Natural History Museum. His Lepidoptera were sold to Charles Oberthür. The Sphingidae are in the Carnegie Museum of Natural History in Pittsburgh, Pennsylvania.

The standard author abbreviation Boisd. is used to indicate this person as the author when citing a botanical name. The standard author abbreviation is Boisduval when citing a zoological name.

== Works ==
- Jean Baptiste Alphonse Déchauffour Boisduval and John Eatton Le Conte, 1829–1837 Histoire général et iconographie des lepidoptérès et des chenilles de l'Amerique septentrionale (in English, General history and illustrations of the Lepidoptera and caterpillars of Northern America) published in Paris. Many of the illustrations for this work were done by John Abbot. The work was not completed until 1837.
- Jean Baptiste Alphonse Déchauffour Boisduval, Jules Pierre Rambur and Adolphe Hercule de Graslin Collection iconographique et historique des chenilles; ou, Description et figures des chenilles d'Europe, avec l'histoire de leurs métamorphoses, et des applications à l'agriculture, Paris, Librairie encyclopédique de Roret, 1832.
- Jules Dumont d'Urville Ed. Voyage de l'Astrolabe. Faune entomologique de l'Océanie par le Dr Boisduval. Tome 1: Lepidoptéres (1832); Tome 2: Coléoptères, Hémiptères, Orthoptères Névroptères, Hyménoptères et Diptères (1835).
- Boisduval, J. B., Mémoire sur les Lépidoptères de Madagascar, Bourbon et Maurice. Nouvelles Annales du Muséum d'Histoire Naturelle. Paris 2:149–270. (1833) online here and published by Librairie Encyclopédique de Roret, 1833
- Histoire Naturelle des Insectes. Species Général des Lépidoptéres. Tome Premier Hist. nat. Ins., Spec. gén. Lépid. 1 : 1–690 (1836)
- Boisduval, J. B., 1852. Lepidoptères de la Californie Annales de la Société Entomologique de France 10(2):275–324.

== See also ==
- Euryades corethrus
