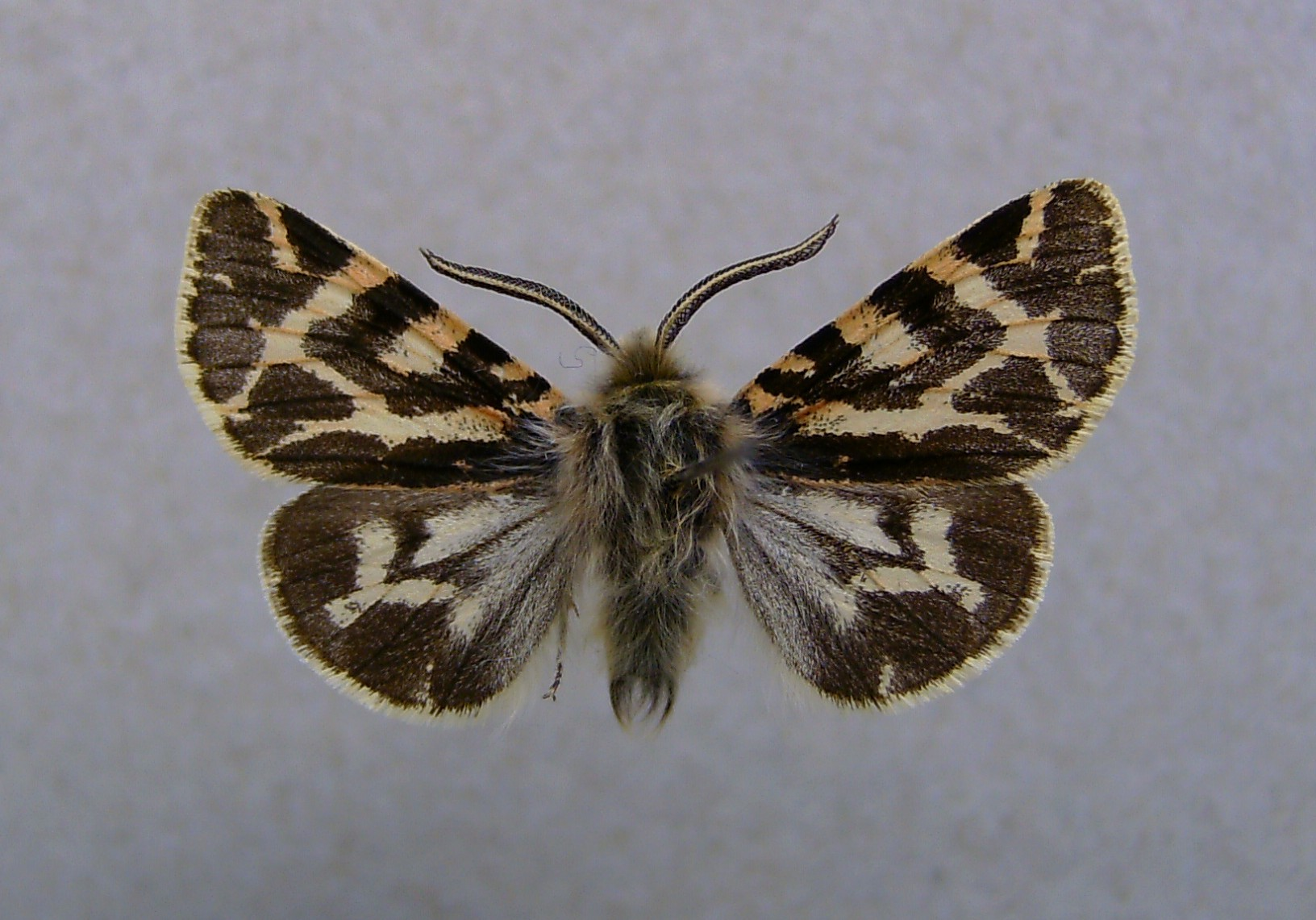

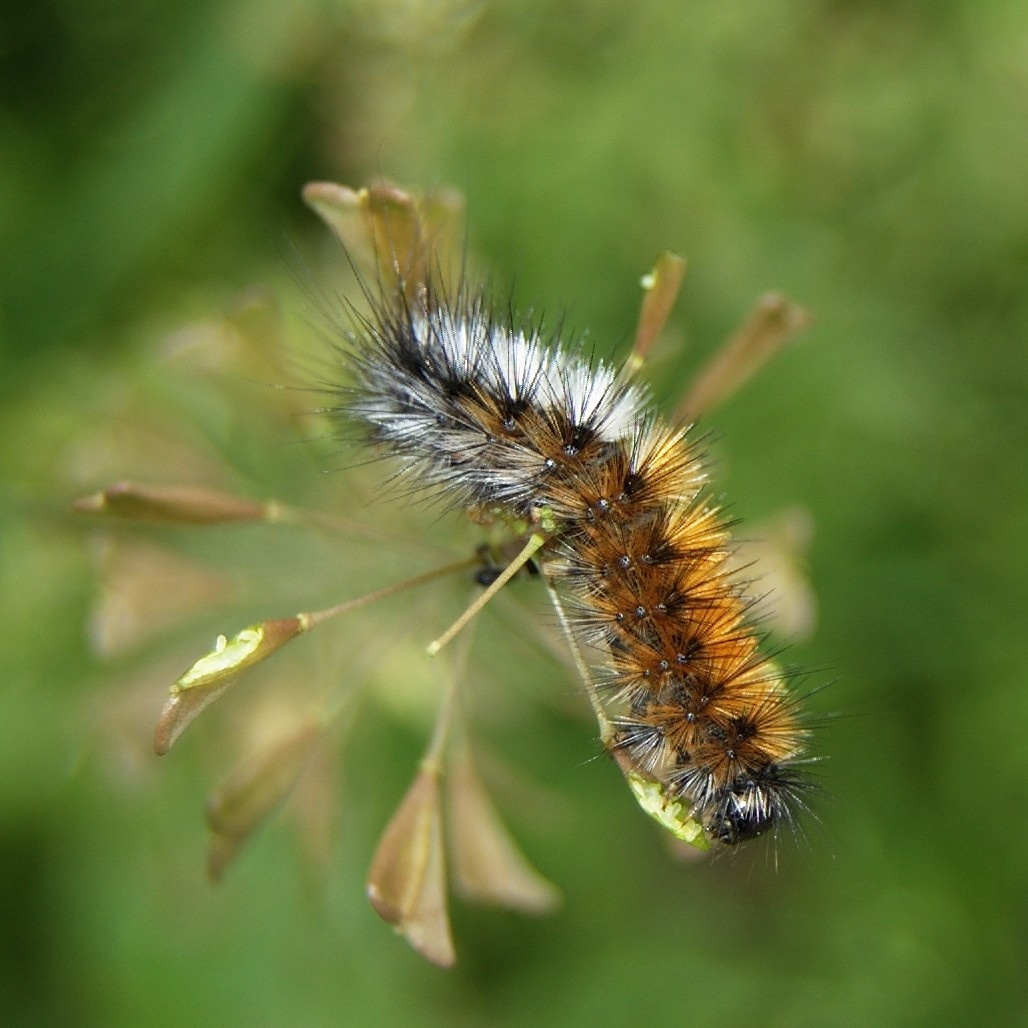
- Adult (top) and larva (bottom)

Scientific classification
- Domain: Eukaryota
- Kingdom: Animalia
- Phylum: Arthropoda
- Class: Insecta
- Order: Lepidoptera
- Superfamily: Noctuoidea
- Family: Erebidae
- Subfamily: Arctiinae
- Genus: Ocnogyna
- Species: O. baetica

Binomial name
- Ocnogyna baetica (Rambur, [1837])

Synonyms
- Trichosoma baetica Rambur, 1836

= Ocnogyna baetica =

Winter webworm

Species of moth

Ocnogyna baetica, also known as Rambur's Pellicle or winter webworm, is a moth of the family Erebidae. The species was first described by Rambur in 1837. It is found in Italy, the Iberian Peninsula and North Africa.

Larvae have been recorded on Hedysarum, Trifolium, Erysimum and mallow (Malva species).
