= Ocnogyna clathrata =

Scientific classification
- Domain: Eukaryota
- Kingdom: Animalia
- Phylum: Arthropoda
- Class: Insecta
- Order: Lepidoptera
- Superfamily: Noctuoidea
- Family: Erebidae
- Subfamily: Arctiinae
- Genus: Ocnogyna
- Species: O. clathrata

Binomial name
- Ocnogyna clathrata (Lederer, 1855)

Synonyms
- Trichosoma clathrata Lederer, 1855; Ocnogyna loewii cypriaca O. Bang-Haas, 1934

Species of moth

Ocnogyna clathrata is a moth of the family Erebidae. It was described by Julius Lederer in 1934. It is found in Lebanon and on Cyprus and Rhodes.

The wingspan is about 35 mm.

The larvae feed on Ranunculus asiaticus.

== Subspecies ==
- Ocnogyna clathrata clathrata (Lebanon)
- Ocnogyna clathrata cypriaca O. Bang-Haas, 1934 (Cyprus, Rhodes)
