= Orphnophanes =

Scientific classification
- Kingdom: Animalia
- Phylum: Arthropoda
- Clade: Pancrustacea
- Class: Insecta
- Order: Lepidoptera
- Family: Crambidae
- Subfamily: Spilomelinae
- Genus: Orphnophanes; Lederer, 1863

Synonyms
- Syntomodora Meyrick, 1894

Genus of moths

Orphnophanes is a genus of moths of the family Crambidae described by Julius Lederer in 1863.

== Species ==
- Orphnophanes ankarampotsyalis Marion & Viette, 1956
- Orphnophanes eucerusalis (Walker, 1859)
- Orphnophanes laevalis (Warren, 1896)
- Orphnophanes thoasalis (Walker, 1859)
- Orphnophanes turbatalis Christoph, 1881
