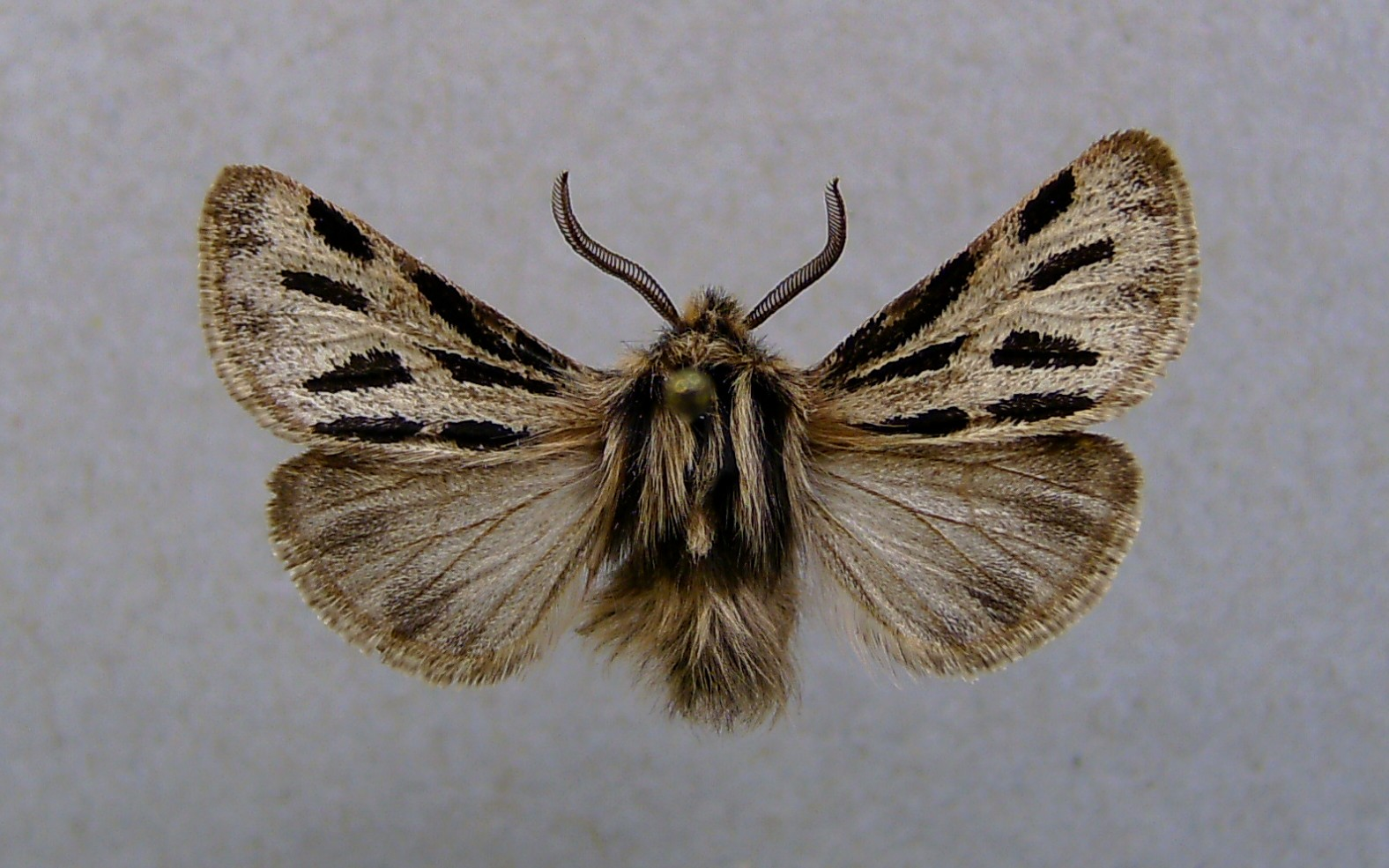

Scientific classification
- Kingdom: Animalia
- Phylum: Arthropoda
- Clade: Pancrustacea
- Class: Insecta
- Order: Lepidoptera
- Superfamily: Noctuoidea
- Family: Erebidae
- Subfamily: Arctiinae
- Genus: Ocnogyna
- Species: O. parasita

Binomial name
- Ocnogyna parasita (Hübner, 1790)

Synonyms
- Phalaena parasita Hübner, 1790; Ocnogyna rothschildi Bang-Haas, 1912

= Ocnogyna parasita =

Species of moth

Ocnogyna parasita is a moth of the family Erebidae. It was described by Jacob Hübner in 1790. It is found in the Alps, the Black Sea region, the Balkan Peninsula, Asia Minor and southern Russia.

The wingspan is 30–34 mm for males and 20–22 mm for females. Adults are on wing from March to April.

The larvae are polyphagous and have been recorded feeding on Gentiana lutea, Plantago, Urtica and Scabiosa species. Larvae can be found in May and June. The species overwinter as a pupa or as an adult.

== Subspecies ==
- Ocnogyna parasita arenosa Witt, 1980 – Greece
- Ocnogyna parasita intermedia Staudinger, 1879 – Asia Minor
- Ocnogyna parasita lianea Witt, 1980 – Macedonia
- Ocnogyna parasita parasita Hübner, 1790 – Central Europe, Moldova, Ukraine
- Ocnogyna parasita rothschildi A. Bang-Haas, 1912 – Russia(Lower Volga)

(Ocnogyna parasita nogelli Lederer, 1865 = Ocnogyna nogelli Lederer, 1865 – Asia Minor).
