= Ocnogyna bellieri =

Scientific classification
- Domain: Eukaryota
- Kingdom: Animalia
- Phylum: Arthropoda
- Class: Insecta
- Order: Lepidoptera
- Superfamily: Noctuoidea
- Family: Erebidae
- Subfamily: Arctiinae
- Genus: Ocnogyna
- Species: O. bellieri

Binomial name
- Ocnogyna bellieri (Lederer, 1855)

Synonyms
- Arctia bellieri Lederer, 1855; Maurica bellieri; Arctia banghaasi berytta Staudinger, 1895; Maurica berytta

Species of moth

Ocnogyna bellieri is a moth of the family Erebidae. It was described by Julius Lederer in 1855. It is found in Turkey.

== Subspecies ==
- Ocnogyna bellieri bellieri
- Ocnogyna bellieri berytta (Staudinger, 1895)
