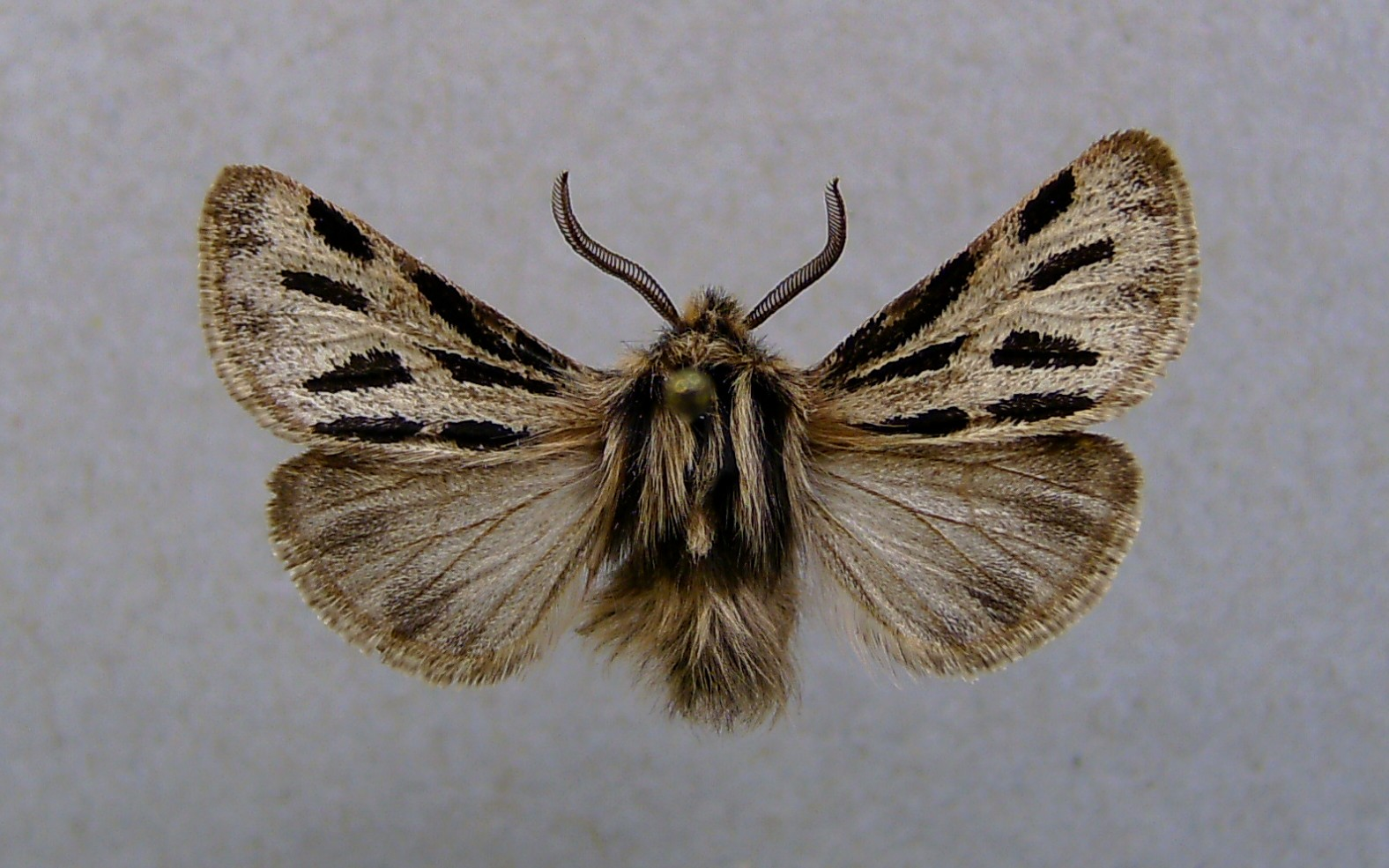
- Ocnogyna parasita

Scientific classification
- Kingdom: Animalia
- Phylum: Arthropoda
- Clade: Pancrustacea
- Class: Insecta
- Order: Lepidoptera
- Superfamily: Noctuoidea
- Family: Erebidae
- Subfamily: Arctiinae
- Subtribe: Spilosomina
- Genus: Ocnogyna; Lederer, 1853

Type species
- Chelonia zoraida Graslin, [1837] 1836

Synonyms
- Pachylischia Rambur, 1866; Nototrachus Rambur, 1866; Somatrichia Kirby, 1892

= Ocnogyna =

Genus of moths

Ocnogyna is a genus of moths in the family Erebidae from western Eurasia. The genus was erected by Julius Lederer in 1853. One aberrant species, Ocnogyna parasita, has females with non-functional wings, and because of this was formerly placed in its own genus Somatrichia, but is now in Ocnogyna.

== Species ==
- Ocnogyna advena (Fabricius, 1787)
- Ocnogyna anatolica Witt, 1980
- Ocnogyna bellieri (Lederer, 1855)
  - Ocnogyna bellieri berytta (Staudinger, 1895)
- Ocnogyna boeticum Rambur, 1836
- Ocnogyna clathrata (Lederer, 1855)
- Ocnogyna corsicum Rambur, 1832
  - Ocnogyna corsicum sardoa Staudinger, 1870
- Ocnogyna herrichi Staudinger, [1879]
- Ocnogyna loewii (Zeller, 1846)
- Ocnogyna mutabilis Turati, 1924
- Ocnogyna nogelli Lederer, 1865
- Ocnogyna parasita (Hübner, 1790)
- Ocnogyna pudens (H. Lucas, 1853)
  - Ocnogyna pudens leprieuri (Oberthür, 1878)
- Ocnogyna zoraida Graslin, [1837] 1836
  - Ocnogyna zoraida hemigena (Graslin, 1850)
