= Dichomeris apludella =

Scientific classification
- Domain: Eukaryota
- Kingdom: Animalia
- Phylum: Arthropoda
- Class: Insecta
- Order: Lepidoptera
- Family: Gelechiidae
- Genus: Dichomeris
- Species: D. apludella

Binomial name
- Dichomeris apludella (Lederer, 1869)

Synonyms
- Hypsolophus apludellus Lederer, 1869; Ypsolophus apludellus Rebel, 1901

Species of moth

Dichomeris apludella is a moth of the family Gelechiidae. It was described by Julius Lederer in 1869. It is known from Iran.
