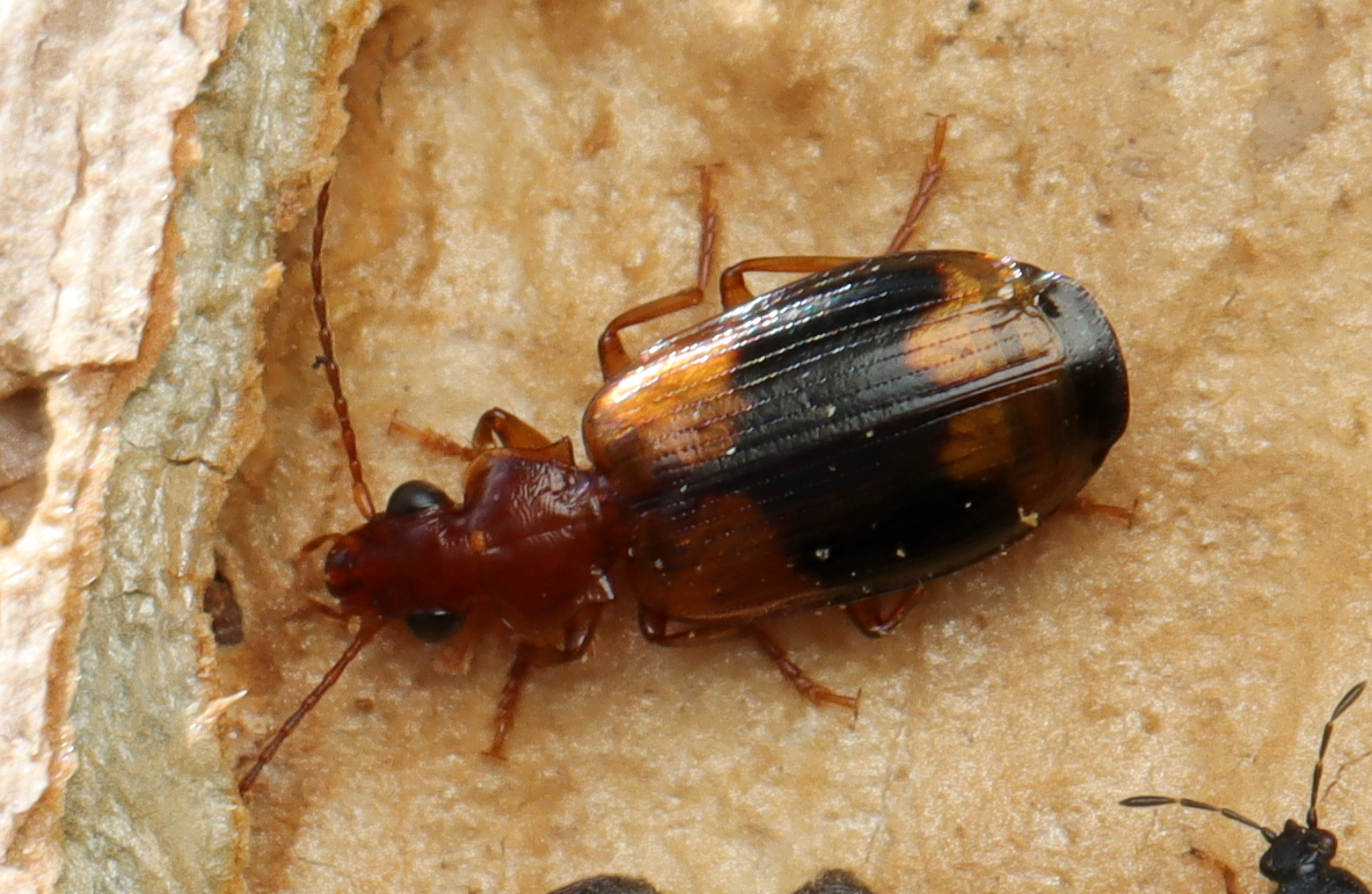
- Singilis laetus

Scientific classification
- Kingdom: Animalia
- Phylum: Arthropoda
- Class: Insecta
- Order: Coleoptera
- Suborder: Adephaga
- Family: Carabidae
- Tribe: Lebiini
- Genus: Singilis; Rambur, 1837

Synonyms
- Agatus Motschulsky, 1845; Phloeozeteus Peyron, 1856; Paralebia Peringuey, 1898; Phloezetaeu Jedlička, 1956; Phloeozetaeus Jedlička, 1961; Phloeozetoeus Jedlička, 1961; Phloeozetteus Jedlička, 1963; Phloeozetus Kabak, 2003

= Singilis =

Genus of beetles

Singilis is a genus of beetles in the family Carabidae, first described by Jules Pierre Rambur in 1837.

== Species ==
Singilis contains the following eighty-nine species:

- Singilis acaciae Bruneau de Mire, 1990
- Singilis africaorientalis Anichtchenko, 2016
- Singilis allardi (Basilewsky, 1963)
- Singilis alternans Bedel, 1905
- Singilis ambulans (Peringuey, 1896)
- Singilis amoenulus (Semenov, 1889)
- Singilis anthracinus Solsky, 1874
- Singilis ater (Mateu, 1978)
- Singilis bashahricus Andrewes, 1933
- Singilis basilewskyi Anichtchenko, 2012
- Singilis bedeli (Escalera, 1913)
- Singilis bedimo Anichtchenko, 2013
- Singilis bicolor Rambur, 1837
- Singilis blandus (Peringuey, 1896)
- Singilis bulirschi Anichtchenko, 2014
- Singilis burtoni Anichtchenko, 2016
- Singilis centralis Antoine, 1963
- Singilis cingulatus Gebler, 1843
- Singilis cordiger (Peringuey, 1896)
- Singilis cribricollis (Peringuey, 1904)
- Singilis crypticus Anichtchenko, 2016
- Singilis cyaneus (Peringuey, 1896)
- Singilis debilis Anichtchenko, 2013
- Singilis decellei (Basilewsky, 1963)
- Singilis discoidalis (Mateu, 1986)
- Singilis dorsalis (Peringuey, 1896)
- Singilis fasciatus (Peringuey, 1896)
- Singilis felixi Anichtchenko, 2011
- Singilis filicornis Peyerimhoff, 1907
- Singilis flavipes (Solsky, 1874)
- Singilis fuscipennis Schaum, 1857
- Singilis fuscoflavus (Felix & Muilwijk, 2009)
- Singilis gentilis (Peringuey, 1896)
- Singilis haekeli Anichtchenko, 2016
- Singilis hanangiensis (Basilewsky, 1962)
- Singilis hirtipennis (Pic, 1901)
- Singilis indicus (Andrewes, 1933)
- Singilis jedlickai Anichtchenko, 2011
- Singilis kabakovi Anichtchenko, 2011
- Singilis klimenkoi Anichtchenko, 2011
- Singilis kolesnichenkoi Anichtchenko, 2011
- Singilis kryzhanovskii Anichtchenko, 2011
- Singilis laetus (Peringuey, 1896)
- Singilis leleupi (Basilewsky, 1962)
- Singilis libani J.R.Sahlberg, 1913
- Singilis lindemannae Basilewsky, 1968
- Singilis loeffleri Jedlicka, 1963
- Singilis lucidus Anichtchenko, 2013
- Singilis maculatus (Mateu, 1978)
- Singilis mahratta Andrewes, 1933
- Singilis makarovi Anichtchenko, 2011
- Singilis mashunus (Peringuey, 1896)
- Singilis mauritanicus Lucas, 1846
- Singilis mbolom Anichtchenko, 2013
- Singilis mesopotamicus Pic, 1901
- Singilis montanus Anichtchenko, 2012
- Singilis muelleri Anichtchenko, 2012
- Singilis nepalensis (Kirschenhofer, 1994)
- Singilis ordinarius Anichtchenko, 2013
- Singilis paganeli Anichtchenko, 2016
- Singilis pallens Anichtchenko, 2016
- Singilis parvulus Anichtchenko, 2016
- Singilis persicus Jedlicka, 1961
- Singilis plagiatus (Reiche & Saulcy, 1855)
- Singilis praestans Peringuey, 1896
- Singilis praeustus Peringuey, 1896
- Singilis puchneri Anichtchenko, 2014
- Singilis pusillus (Peringuey, 1899)
- Singilis saeedi Anichtchenko, 2011
- Singilis schuelei Anichtchenko, 2013
- Singilis semirufus (Motschulsky, 1864)
- Singilis shalapkoi Anichtchenko, 2013
- Singilis shavrini Anichtchenko, 2016
- Singilis signatus Peringuey, 1896
- Singilis solskyi Anichtchenko, 2011
- Singilis somalicus Anichtchenko, 2016
- Singilis soror Rambur, 1837
- Singilis squalidus Andrewes, 1933
- Singilis stigma (Peringuey, 1896)
- Singilis timidus Anichtchenko, 2011
- Singilis timuri Anichtchenko, 2011
- Singilis transversus Boheman, 1848
- Singilis turcicus (Jedlicka, 1963)
- Singilis umbraculatus Boheman, 1848
- Singilis umtalinus Peringuey, 1904
- Singilis venator (Peringuey, 1896)
- Singilis vicarius (Peringuey, 1898)
- Singilis virgatus (Peringuey, 1896)
- Singilis zonata Chaudoir, 1878
