= Neargyractis moniligeralis =

Scientific classification
- Kingdom: Animalia
- Phylum: Arthropoda
- Class: Insecta
- Order: Lepidoptera
- Family: Crambidae
- Genus: Neargyractis
- Species: N. moniligeralis

Binomial name
- Neargyractis moniligeralis (Lederer, 1863)

Synonyms
- Cataclysta moniligeralis Lederer, 1863

Species of insect

Neargyractis moniligeralis is a species of moth in the family Crambidae. It was described by Julius Lederer in 1863. It is found in Central America, the Antilles and northern South America.
