= Crypsiptya nereidalis =

Scientific classification
- Domain: Eukaryota
- Kingdom: Animalia
- Phylum: Arthropoda
- Class: Insecta
- Order: Lepidoptera
- Family: Crambidae
- Genus: Crypsiptya
- Species: C. nereidalis

Binomial name
- Crypsiptya nereidalis (Lederer, 1863)

Synonyms
- Botys nereidalis Lederer, 1863; Psara fulgidalis Pagenstecher, 1900

Species of moth

Crypsiptya nereidalis is a moth in the family Crambidae. It was described by Julius Lederer in 1863. It is found on the Moluccas and the Bismarck Archipelago.
