= Ceramida malacensis =

Scientific classification
- Kingdom: Animalia
- Phylum: Arthropoda
- Class: Insecta
- Order: Coleoptera
- Suborder: Polyphaga
- Infraorder: Scarabaeiformia
- Family: Scarabaeidae
- Genus: Ceramida
- Species: C. malacensis

Binomial name
- Ceramida malacensis (Rambur, 1843)

Synonyms
- Elaphocera malacensis Rambur, 1843; Elaphocera luctuosa Baguena, 1955; Elaphocera lusitanica Baraud, 1975; Elaphocera mancinii Baguena, 1955; Elaphocera tangeriana Kraatz, 1882

Species of beetle

Ceramida malacensis is a species of beetle in the Melolonthinae subfamily. It was described by Jules Pierre Rambur in 1843 and is found in Portugal and Spain.
