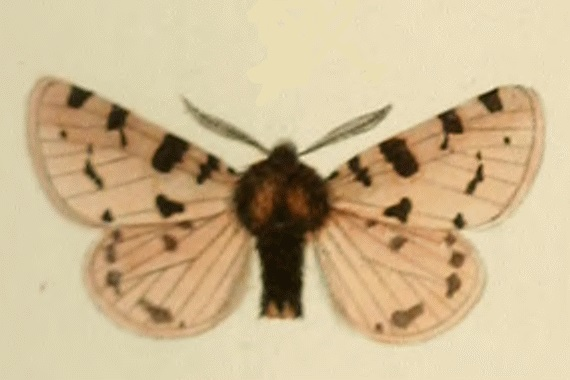

Scientific classification
- Domain: Eukaryota
- Kingdom: Animalia
- Phylum: Arthropoda
- Class: Insecta
- Order: Lepidoptera
- Superfamily: Noctuoidea
- Family: Erebidae
- Subfamily: Arctiinae
- Genus: Ocnogyna
- Species: O. zoraida

Binomial name
- Ocnogyna zoraida (Graslin, [1837] 1836)

Synonyms
- Chelonia zoraida Graslin, 1837; Chelonia hemigena de Graslin, 1850

= Ocnogyna zoraida =

Species of moth

Ocnogyna zoraida is a moth of the family Erebidae. It was described by Adolphe Hercule de Graslin in 1836 or 1837. It is found in France, Spain and Portugal.

The wingspan is 21–35 mm. Adults are on wing in May.

The larvae feed on Plantago, Achillea, Taraxacum, Rumex, Urtica, Salvia, Astragalus, Galium and Ulex species. Larvae can be found from July to August.

== Subspecies ==
- Ocnogyna zoraida zoraida (Spain: Andalusia)
- Ocnogyna zoraida hemigena (Graslin, 1850) (Pyrenees)
