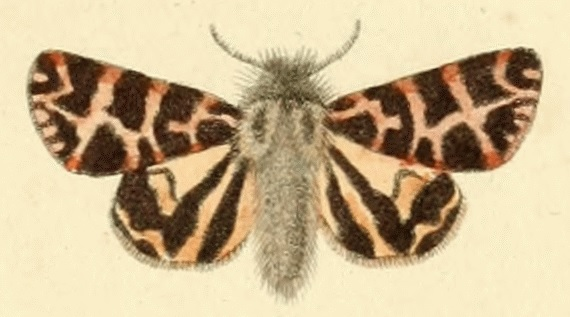
- Male

Scientific classification
- Domain: Eukaryota
- Kingdom: Animalia
- Phylum: Arthropoda
- Class: Insecta
- Order: Lepidoptera
- Superfamily: Noctuoidea
- Family: Erebidae
- Subfamily: Arctiinae
- Genus: Ocnogyna
- Species: O. corsicum

Binomial name
- Ocnogyna corsicum (Rambur, 1832)

Synonyms
- Trichosoma corsicum Rambur, 1832; Ocnogyna corsica; Ocnogyna corsica var. sardoa Staudinger, 1870

= Ocnogyna corsicum =

Species of moth

Ocnogyna corsicum is a moth of the family Erebidae. It was described by Jules Pierre Rambur in 1832.

== Distribution ==
It is found on Corsica and Sardinia.

== Biology ==
The habitat consists of grasslands, pastures, maquis, forest edges and mountain slopes.

== Description ==
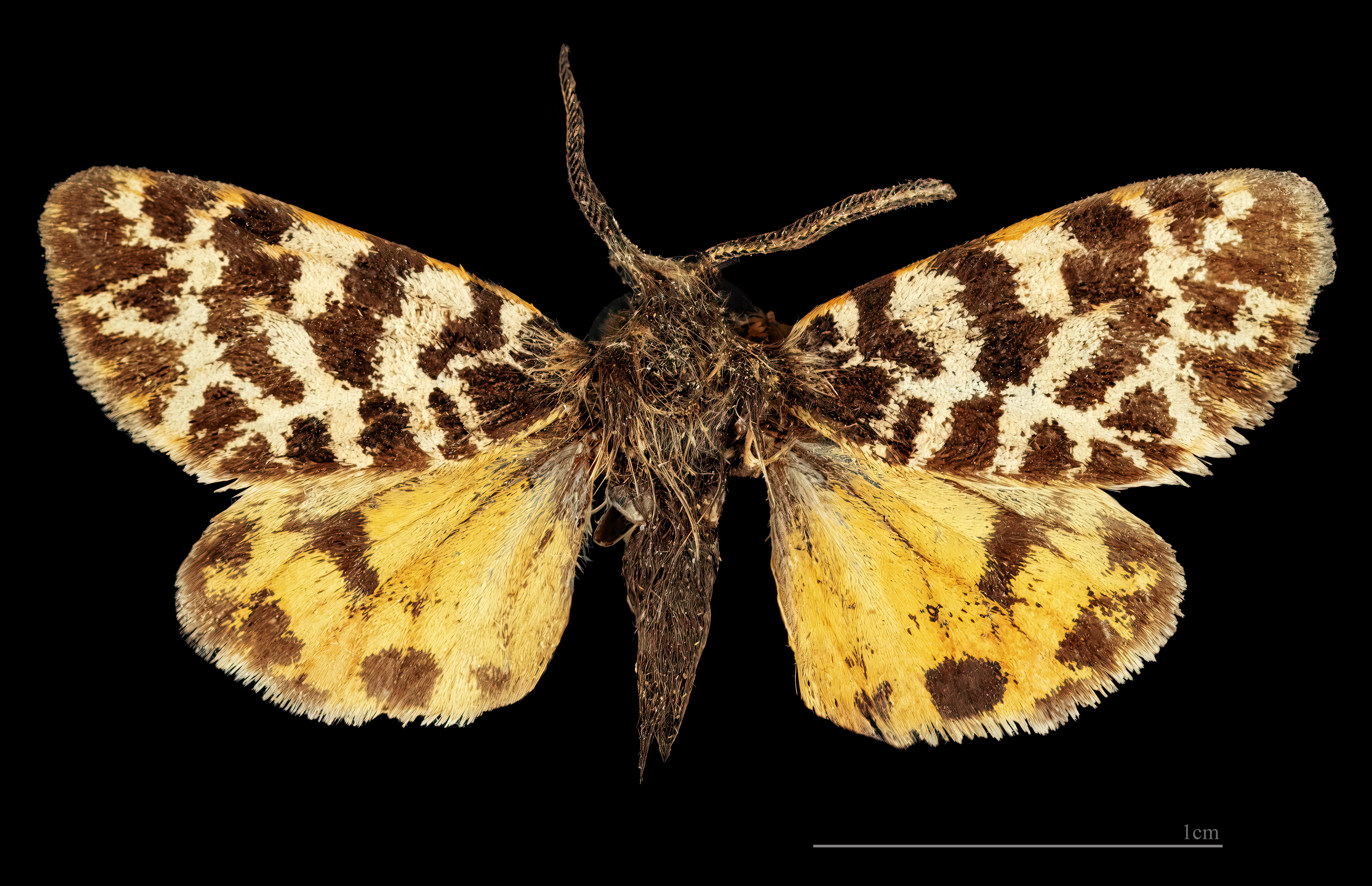
♂

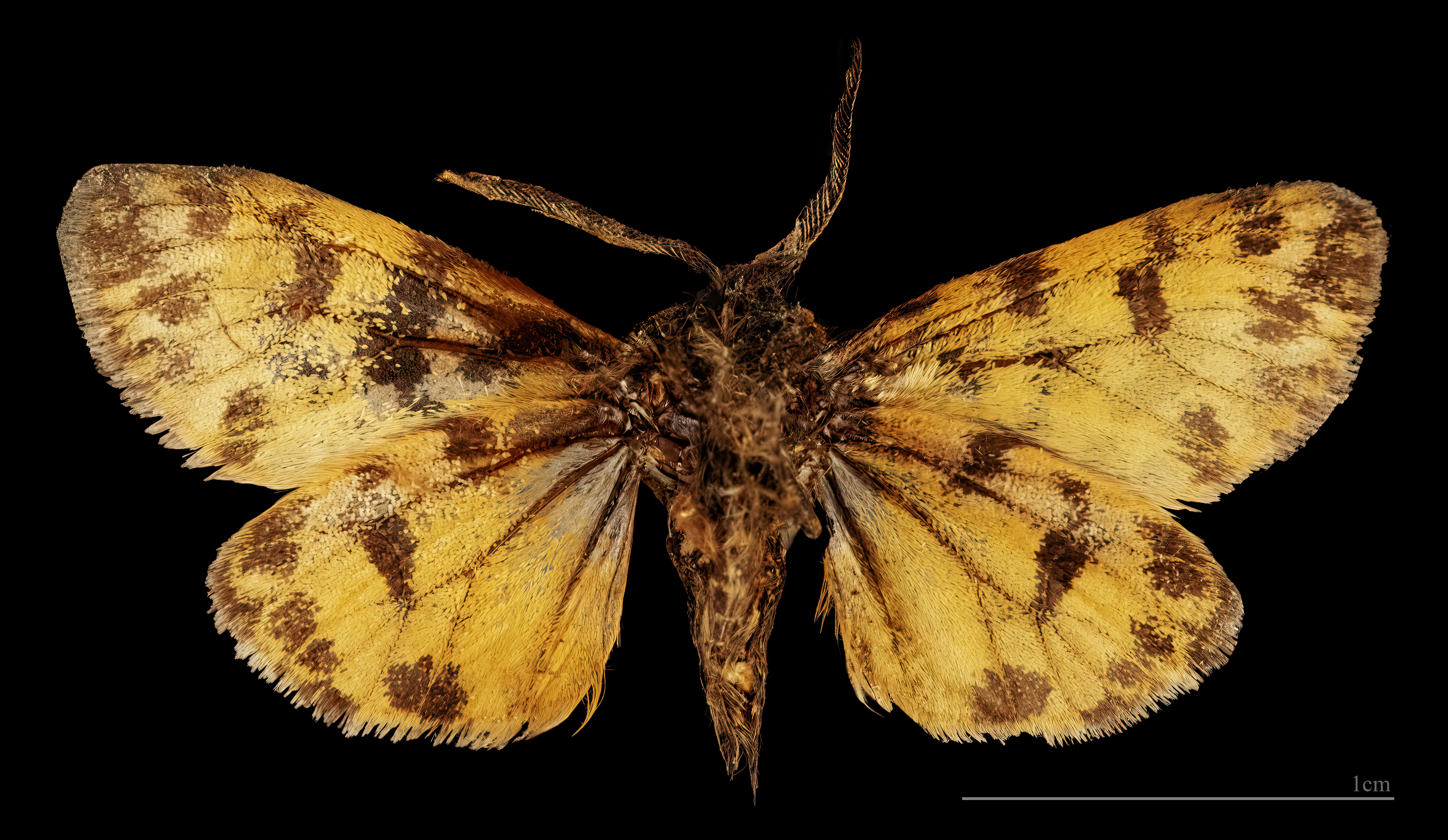
♂ △

The females are brachypterous.

The larvae are polyphagous and have been recorded feeding on various plants, including Genista, Urtica, Trifolium, Taraxacum, Plantago and Gramineae species. Larvae can be found from April to June.

== Subspecies ==
- Ocnogyna corsicum corsica (Corsica)
- Ocnogyna corsicum sardoa Staudinger, 1870 (Sardinia)

== Gallery ==
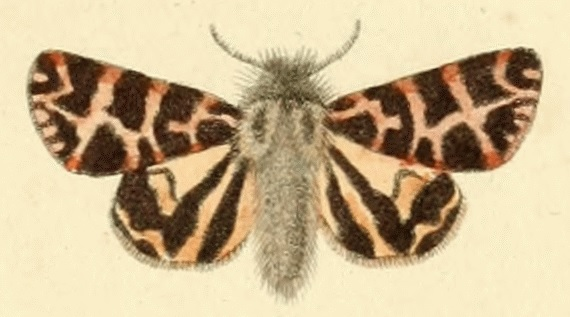
Male

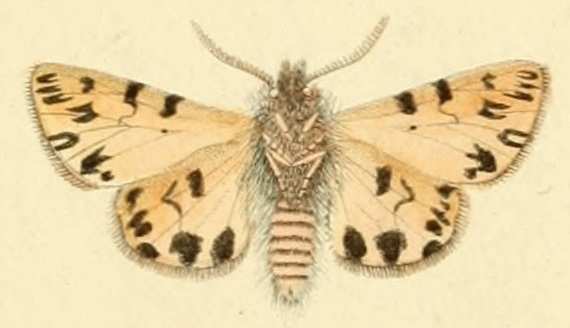
Male

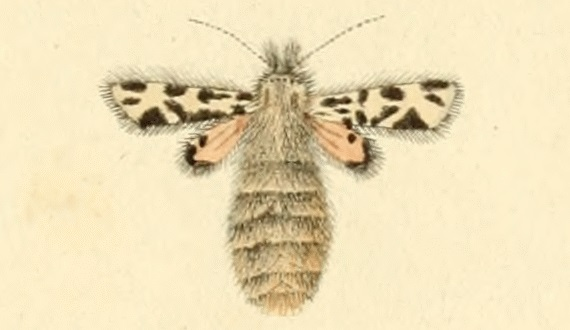
Female

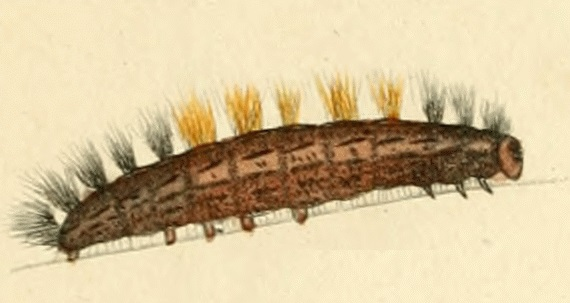
Larva

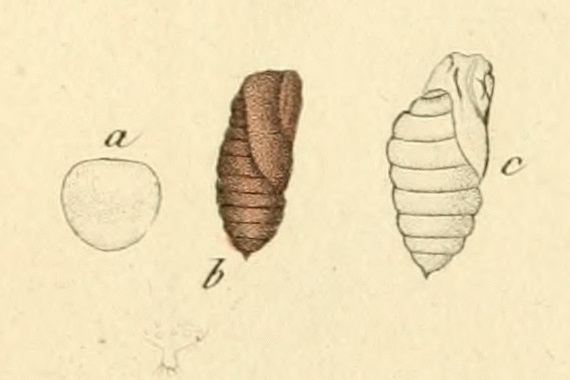
Life cycle
