= Scopula scalercii =

Scientific classification
- Kingdom: Animalia
- Phylum: Arthropoda
- Clade: Pancrustacea
- Class: Insecta
- Order: Lepidoptera
- Family: Geometridae
- Genus: Scopula
- Species: S. scalercii

Binomial name
- Scopula scalercii Hausmann, 2003

Synonyms
- Scopula beckeraria parenzani (manuscript name)

Species of geometer moth in subfamily Sterrhinae

Scopula scalercii is a moth of the family Geometridae that can be found in central and southern Italy.
