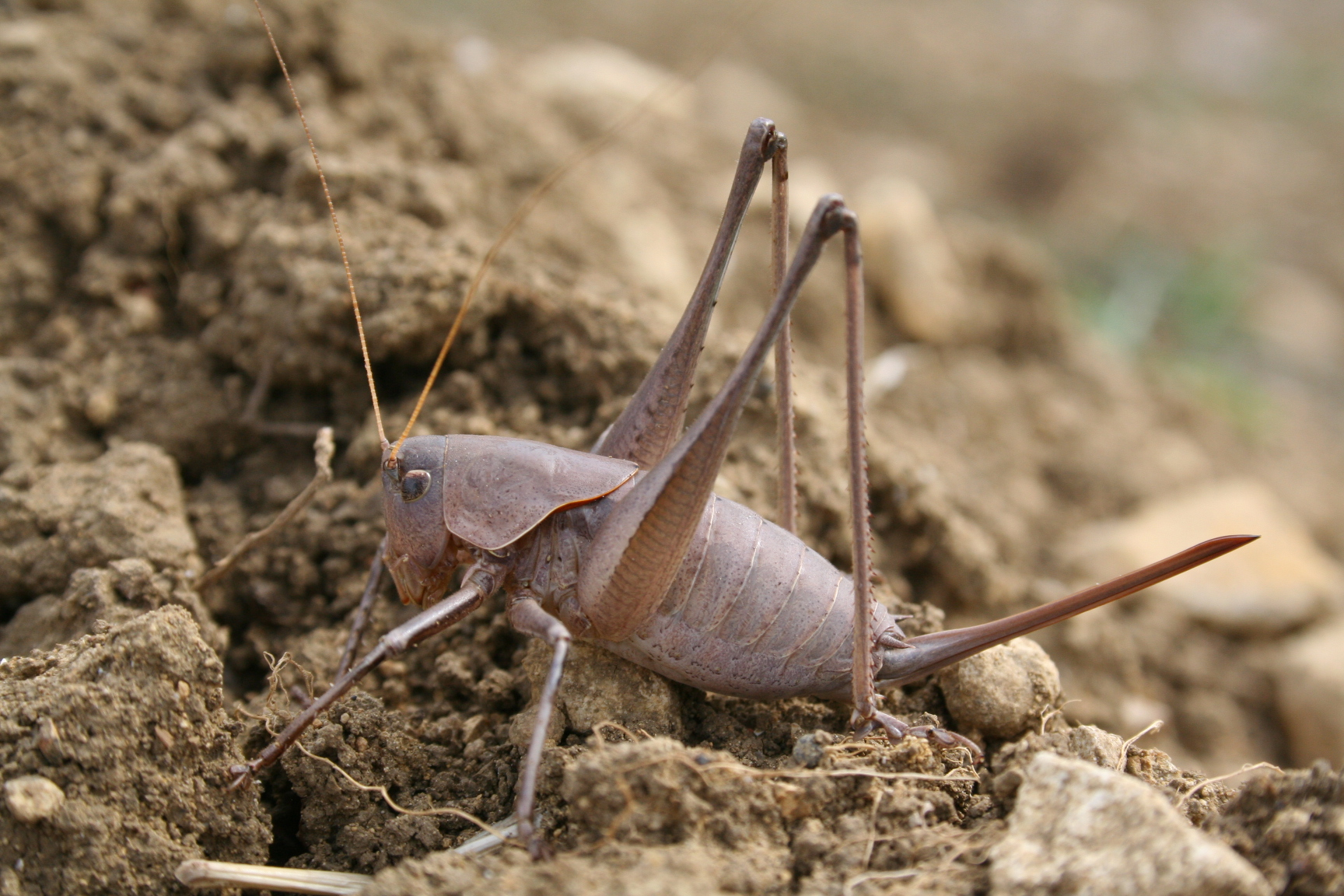
- Thyreonotus corsicus female, France

Scientific classification
- Domain: Eukaryota
- Kingdom: Animalia
- Phylum: Arthropoda
- Class: Insecta
- Order: Orthoptera
- Suborder: Ensifera
- Family: Tettigoniidae
- Subfamily: Tettigoniinae
- Tribe: Tettigoniini
- Genus: Thyreonotus
- Species: T. corsicus

Binomial name
- Thyreonotus corsicus Rambur, 1838

= Thyreonotus corsicus =

Species of cricket-like animal

Thyreonotus corsicus is a species belonging to the family Tettigoniidae subfamily Tettigoniinae. It is found in the western Mediterranean from the Iberian Peninsula over the south of France to the southwestern Alps. Isolated populations are found in Corsica and Sardinia.
