= Ceramida adusta =

Scientific classification
- Kingdom: Animalia
- Phylum: Arthropoda
- Class: Insecta
- Order: Coleoptera
- Suborder: Polyphaga
- Infraorder: Scarabaeiformia
- Family: Scarabaeidae
- Genus: Ceramida
- Species: C. adusta

Binomial name
- Ceramida adusta (Kraatz, 1882)

Synonyms
- Elaphocera abderramani Escalera, 1923; Elaphocera certa Baguena, 1955

Species of beetle

Ceramida malacensis is a species of beetle in the Melolonthinae subfamily that is endemic to Spain.
