= Ceramida cobosi =

Scientific classification
- Kingdom: Animalia
- Phylum: Arthropoda
- Class: Insecta
- Order: Coleoptera
- Suborder: Polyphaga
- Infraorder: Scarabaeiformia
- Family: Scarabaeidae
- Genus: Ceramida
- Species: C. cobosi

Binomial name
- Ceramida cobosi (Baguena, 1955)

Synonyms
- Elaphocera cobosi Baguena, 1955

Species of beetle

Ceramida cobosi is a species of beetle in the Melolonthinae subfamily that is endemic to Spain.
