= Ocnogyna pudens =

Scientific classification
- Domain: Eukaryota
- Kingdom: Animalia
- Phylum: Arthropoda
- Class: Insecta
- Order: Lepidoptera
- Superfamily: Noctuoidea
- Family: Erebidae
- Subfamily: Arctiinae
- Genus: Ocnogyna
- Species: O. pudens

Binomial name
- Ocnogyna pudens (H. Lucas, 1853)

Synonyms
- Trichosoma pudens H. Lucas, 1853; Spilosoma vallantini Austaut, 1894; Ocnogyna valantini; Spilosoma leprieuri Oberthür, 1878; Phragmatobia faroulti Rothschild, 1911; Ocnogyna faroulti

Species of moth

Ocnogyna pudens is a moth of the family Erebidae. It was described by Hippolyte Lucas in 1853. It is found in North Africa.

== Subspecies ==
- Ocnogyna pudens pudens
- Ocnogyna pudens leprieuri (Oberthür, 1878)
