= Neargyractis fulvicinctalis =

Scientific classification
- Kingdom: Animalia
- Phylum: Arthropoda
- Class: Insecta
- Order: Lepidoptera
- Family: Crambidae
- Genus: Neargyractis
- Species: N. fulvicinctalis

Binomial name
- Neargyractis fulvicinctalis (Hampson, 1897)

Synonyms
- Cataclysta fulvicinctalis Hampson, 1897

Species of moth

Neargyractis fulvicinctalis is a species of moth in the family Crambidae. It was described by George Hampson in 1897. It is found on Jamaica.
