= Ceramida longitarsis =

Scientific classification
- Kingdom: Animalia
- Phylum: Arthropoda
- Class: Insecta
- Order: Coleoptera
- Suborder: Polyphaga
- Infraorder: Scarabaeiformia
- Family: Scarabaeidae
- Genus: Ceramida
- Species: C. longitarsis

Binomial name
- Ceramida longitarsis (Illiger, 1803)

Synonyms
- Melolontha longitarsis Illiger, 1803

Species of beetle

Ceramida longitarsis is a species of beetle in the Melolonthinae subfamily. It was described by Johann Karl Wilhelm Illiger in 1803 and is endemic to Portugal.
