= Crypsiptya viettalis =

Scientific classification
- Domain: Eukaryota
- Kingdom: Animalia
- Phylum: Arthropoda
- Class: Insecta
- Order: Lepidoptera
- Family: Crambidae
- Genus: Crypsiptya
- Species: C. viettalis

Binomial name
- Crypsiptya viettalis (Marion, 1956)

Synonyms
- Crocidophora viettalis Marion, 1956

Species of moth

Crypsiptya viettalis is a moth in the family Crambidae. It was described by Hubert Marion in 1956. It is found on Madagascar.
