= Orphnophanes eucerusalis =

Scientific classification
- Kingdom: Animalia
- Phylum: Arthropoda
- Class: Insecta
- Order: Lepidoptera
- Family: Crambidae
- Genus: Orphnophanes
- Species: O. eucerusalis

Binomial name
- Orphnophanes eucerusalis (Walker, 1859)

Synonyms
- Botys eucerusalis Walker, 1859; Orphnophanes productalis Lederer, 1863

Species of moth

Orphnophanes eucerusalis is a moth in the family Crambidae. It was described by Francis Walker in 1859. It is found in Indonesia (Borneo, Ambon Island), India (Sikkim) and Australia, where it has been recorded from Queensland.
