= Neargyractis slossonalis =

Scientific classification
- Kingdom: Animalia
- Phylum: Arthropoda
- Class: Insecta
- Order: Lepidoptera
- Family: Crambidae
- Genus: Neargyractis
- Species: N. slossonalis

Binomial name
- Neargyractis slossonalis (Dyar, 1906)

Synonyms
- Elophila slossonalis Dyar, 1906

Species of moth

Neargyractis slossonalis, the dimorphic leafcutter moth, is a species of moth in the family Crambidae. It was described by Harrison Gray Dyar Jr. in 1906. It is found in Cuba and the south-eastern United States, where it has been recorded from Alabama, Florida, South Carolina, Georgia and Mississippi.

The wingspan is about 13 mm. Adults have been recorded on wing year round.
