= Ocnogyna advena =

Scientific classification
- Domain: Eukaryota
- Kingdom: Animalia
- Phylum: Arthropoda
- Class: Insecta
- Order: Lepidoptera
- Superfamily: Noctuoidea
- Family: Erebidae
- Subfamily: Arctiinae
- Genus: Ocnogyna
- Species: O. advena

Binomial name
- Ocnogyna advena (Fabricius, 1787)

Synonyms
- Bombyx advena Fabricius, 1787; Trichosoma pierreti Rambur, 1841; Ocnogyna pierreti; Nototrachus pierreti; Trichosoma mauretanicum H.Lucas, 1848; Ocnogyna mauretanicum; Trichosoma atlanticum H.Lucas, 1853; Ocnogyna atlanticum; Trichosoma huguenini Oberthür, 1878; Ocnogyna huguenini; Trichosoma gandolphei Oberthür, 1881; Ocnogyna gandolphei; Ocnogyna adaena pallida Rothschild, 1917; Ocnogyna massueroi Turati, 1930

Species of moth

Ocnogyna advena is a moth of the family Erebidae. It was described by Johan Christian Fabricius in 1787. It is found in North Africa.
