= Ceramida moelleri =

Scientific classification
- Kingdom: Animalia
- Phylum: Arthropoda
- Class: Insecta
- Order: Coleoptera
- Suborder: Polyphaga
- Infraorder: Scarabaeiformia
- Family: Scarabaeidae
- Genus: Ceramida
- Species: C. moelleri

Binomial name
- Ceramida moelleri (Flach, 1906)

Synonyms
- Elaphocera gigas Serrano, 1985; Ceramida isabellae López-Colón, 1993

Species of beetle

Ceramida moelleri is a species of beetle in the Melolonthinae subfamily that can be found in Portugal and Spain.
