= Maurica joiceyi =

Scientific classification
- Domain: Eukaryota
- Kingdom: Animalia
- Phylum: Arthropoda
- Class: Insecta
- Order: Lepidoptera
- Superfamily: Noctuoidea
- Family: Erebidae
- Subfamily: Arctiinae
- Genus: Maurica
- Species: M. joiceyi

Binomial name
- Maurica joiceyi (Talbot, 1928)

Synonyms
- Ocnogyna joiceyi Talbot, 1928; Phragmatobia interrupta Schwingenschuss, 1935; Phragmatobia breveti monticola Reisser, 1934; Moenas chneouri Rungs, 1951

Species of moth

Maurica joiceyi is a moth of the family Erebidae. It was described by George Talbot in 1928. It is found in North Africa.

== Subspecies ==
- Maurica joiceyi joiceyi
- Maurica joiceyi monticola (Reisser, 1934)
- Maurica joiceyi chneouri (Rungs, 1951)
