= Neargyractis holocycla =

Scientific classification
- Kingdom: Animalia
- Phylum: Arthropoda
- Class: Insecta
- Order: Lepidoptera
- Family: Crambidae
- Genus: Neargyractis
- Species: N. holocycla

Binomial name
- Neargyractis holocycla (Meyrick, 1936)

Synonyms
- Argyractis holocycla Meyrick, 1936

Species of moth

Neargyractis holocycla is a species of moth in the family Crambidae. It was described by Edward Meyrick in 1936. It is found in Venezuela.
