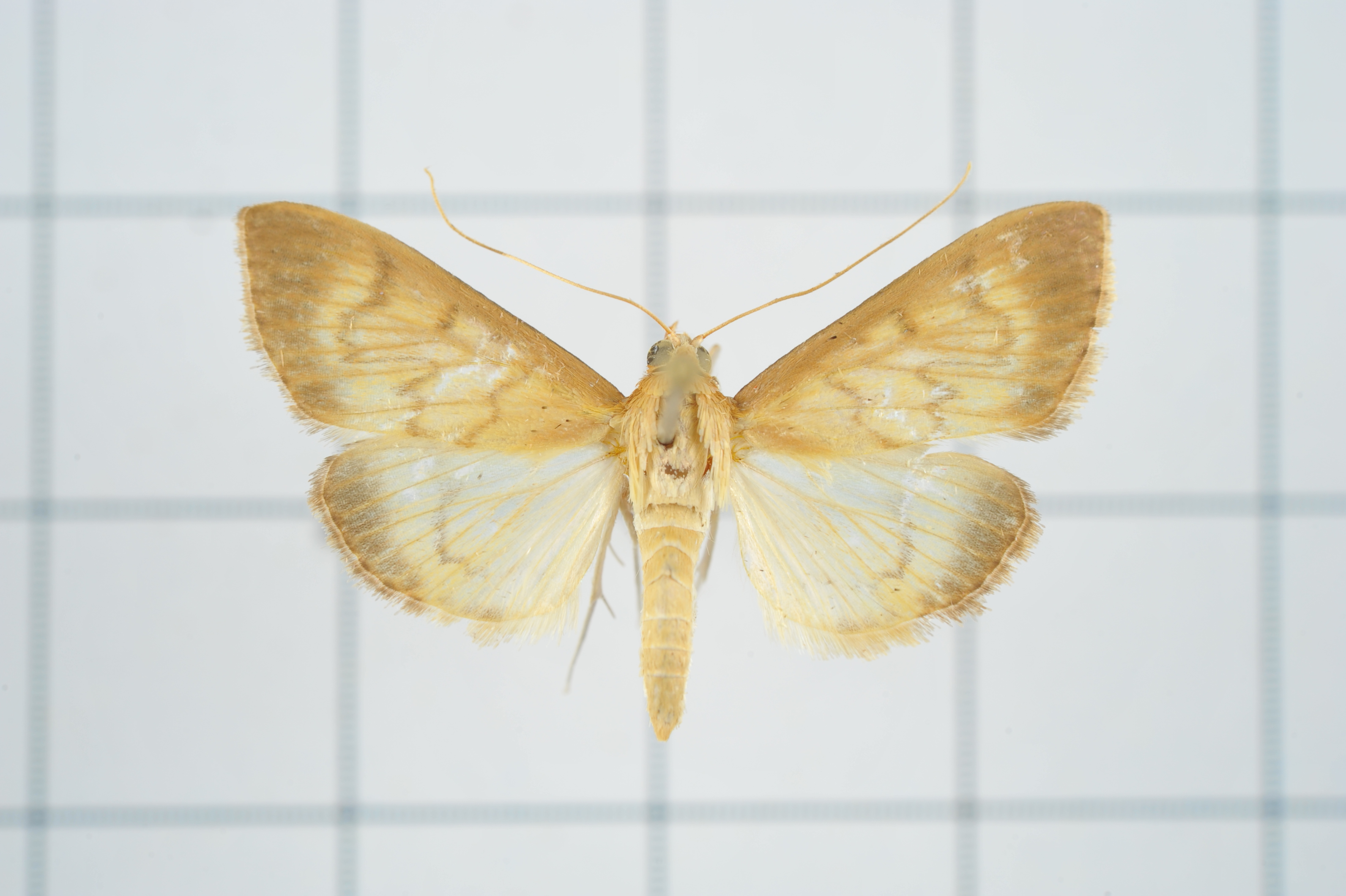

Scientific classification
- Kingdom: Animalia
- Phylum: Arthropoda
- Class: Insecta
- Order: Lepidoptera
- Family: Crambidae
- Genus: Crypsiptya
- Species: C. coclesalis

Binomial name
- Crypsiptya coclesalis (Walker, 1859)

Synonyms
- Botys coclesalis Walker, 1859; Botys lacrymalis Leech, 1889; Botys interfusalis Walker, 1866; Botys itemalesalis Walker, 1859; Coclebotys itemasalis Munroe & Mutuura, 1969; Botys strenualis Walker, 1866

= Crypsiptya coclesalis =

Species of moth

Crypsiptya coclesalis is a moth in the family Crambidae. It was described by Francis Walker in 1859. It is found in Japan, China and India and on Borneo and Java.

The wingspan 26–29 mm.

It is a major pest of bamboo, causing serious economic loss of growth and yield in nurseries, plantations and natural forests.
