= Maurica breveti =

Scientific classification
- Domain: Eukaryota
- Kingdom: Animalia
- Phylum: Arthropoda
- Class: Insecta
- Order: Lepidoptera
- Superfamily: Noctuoidea
- Family: Erebidae
- Subfamily: Arctiinae
- Genus: Maurica
- Species: M. breveti

Binomial name
- Maurica breveti (Oberthür, 1882)

Synonyms
- Trichosoma breveti Oberthür, 1882; Ocnogyna breveti; Maenas breveti occidentalis Rothschild, 1910; Trichosoma nisseni [D. Lucas], 1920; Phragmatobia emmanuelii Oberthür, 1922; Phragmatobia breveti meridionalis Rungs, 1942; Ocnogyna powelli Oberthür, 1910; Ocnogyna breveti powelli Oberthür, 1910

Species of moth

Maurica breveti is a moth of the family Erebidae. It was described by Charles Oberthür in 1882. It is found in North Africa and Spain.

The wingspan is about 30 mm.

The larvae feed on Campanula, Convolvulus, Lavandula, Parietaria, Silene, Smilax and Asparagus species.

== Subspecies ==
- Maurica breveti breveti (Morocco)
- Maurica breveti powelli (Oberthür, 1910)
