= Ocnogyna herrichi =

Scientific classification
- Domain: Eukaryota
- Kingdom: Animalia
- Phylum: Arthropoda
- Class: Insecta
- Order: Lepidoptera
- Superfamily: Noctuoidea
- Family: Erebidae
- Subfamily: Arctiinae
- Genus: Ocnogyna
- Species: O. herrichi

Binomial name
- Ocnogyna herrichi Staudinger, [1879]

Species of moth

Ocnogyna herrichi is a moth of the family Erebidae. It was described by Otto Staudinger in 1879. It is found in Turkey.
