= Ceramida =

Scientific classification
- Kingdom: Animalia
- Phylum: Arthropoda
- Class: Insecta
- Order: Coleoptera
- Suborder: Polyphaga
- Infraorder: Scarabaeiformia
- Family: Scarabaeidae
- Subfamily: Melolonthinae
- Genus: Ceramida; Baraud, 1987

Synonyms
- Elaphocera Reitter, 1902

Genus of beetles

Ceramida is a genus of scarab beetles that are endemic to the southern Iberian Peninsula. Some of its species are pests, primarily of olive trees. Its taxonomy is uncertain due to its unclear diagnostic characteristics.

== Species ==
- Ceramida adusta
- Ceramida baraudi
- Ceramida bedeaui
- Ceramida brancoi
- Ceramida brandeiroi
- Ceramida cobosi
- Ceramida dinizi
- Ceramida longitarsis
- Ceramida malacensis
- Ceramida moelleri
