= Crypsiptya ruficostalis =

Scientific classification
- Kingdom: Animalia
- Phylum: Arthropoda
- Class: Insecta
- Order: Lepidoptera
- Family: Crambidae
- Genus: Crypsiptya
- Species: C. ruficostalis

Binomial name
- Crypsiptya ruficostalis (Hampson, 1918)

Synonyms
- Cocidophora ruficostalis Hampson, 1918

Species of moth

Crypsiptya ruficostalis is a moth in the family Crambidae. It was described by George Hampson in 1918. It is found in Malawi and Mozambique.
