= Neargyractis caesoalis =

Scientific classification
- Kingdom: Animalia
- Phylum: Arthropoda
- Class: Insecta
- Order: Lepidoptera
- Family: Crambidae
- Genus: Neargyractis
- Species: N. caesoalis

Binomial name
- Neargyractis caesoalis (Walker, 1859)

Synonyms
- Cataclysta caesoalis Walker, 1859

Species of moth

Neargyractis caesoalis is a species of moth in the family Crambidae. It was described by Francis Walker in 1859. It is found in Rio de Janeiro, Brazil.
