= Orphnophanes ankarampotsyalis =

Scientific classification
- Kingdom: Animalia
- Phylum: Arthropoda
- Class: Insecta
- Order: Lepidoptera
- Family: Crambidae
- Genus: Orphnophanes
- Species: O. ankarampotsyalis

Binomial name
- Orphnophanes ankarampotsyalis Marion & Viette, 1956

Species of moth

Orphnophanes ankarampotsyalis is a moth in the family Crambidae. It was described by Hubert Marion and Pierre Viette in 1956. It is found on Madagascar.
