= Neargyractis =

Scientific classification
- Domain: Eukaryota
- Kingdom: Animalia
- Phylum: Arthropoda
- Class: Insecta
- Order: Lepidoptera
- Family: Crambidae
- Subfamily: Acentropinae
- Genus: Neargyractis; Lange, 1956

Genus of moths

Neargyractis is a genus of moths of the family Crambidae.

== Species ==
- Neargyractis alemundalis (Schaus, 1924)
- Neargyractis caesoalis (Walker, 1859)
- Neargyractis fulvicinctalis (Hampson, 1897)
- Neargyractis holocycla (Meyrick, 1936)
- Neargyractis moniligeralis (Lederer, 1863)
- Neargyractis plusialis (Herrich-Schäffer, 1871)
- Neargyractis serapionalis (Schaus, 1924)
- Neargyractis slossonalis Dyar, 1906
