= Orphnophanes turbatalis =

Scientific classification
- Domain: Eukaryota
- Kingdom: Animalia
- Phylum: Arthropoda
- Class: Insecta
- Order: Lepidoptera
- Family: Crambidae
- Genus: Orphnophanes
- Species: O. turbatalis

Binomial name
- Orphnophanes turbatalis Christoph, 1881

Species of moth

Orphnophanes turbatalis is a moth in the family Crambidae. It was described by Hugo Theodor Christoph in 1881. It is found in the Russian Far East (Amur).
