= Crypsiptya mutuuri =

Scientific classification
- Domain: Eukaryota
- Kingdom: Animalia
- Phylum: Arthropoda
- Class: Insecta
- Order: Lepidoptera
- Family: Crambidae
- Genus: Crypsiptya
- Species: C. mutuuri

Binomial name
- Crypsiptya mutuuri (Rose & Pajni, 1979)

Synonyms
- Coclebotys mutuuri Rose & Pajni, 1979

Species of moth

Crypsiptya mutuuri is a moth in the family Crambidae. It was described by Rose and Pajni in 1979. It is found in India (Uttar Pradesh).
