= Neargyractis plusialis =

Scientific classification
- Kingdom: Animalia
- Phylum: Arthropoda
- Class: Insecta
- Order: Lepidoptera
- Family: Crambidae
- Genus: Neargyractis
- Species: N. plusialis

Binomial name
- Neargyractis plusialis (Herrich-Schäffer, 1871)

Synonyms
- Cataclysta plusialis Herrich-Schäffer, 1871

Species of moth

Neargyractis plusialis is a species of moth in the family Crambidae. It was described by Gottlieb August Wilhelm Herrich-Schäffer in 1871. It is found in Cuba and Puerto Rico.
