= Crypsiptya africalis =

Scientific classification
- Domain: Eukaryota
- Kingdom: Animalia
- Phylum: Arthropoda
- Class: Insecta
- Order: Lepidoptera
- Family: Crambidae
- Genus: Crypsiptya
- Species: C. africalis

Binomial name
- Crypsiptya africalis Maes, 2002

Species of moth

Crypsiptya africalis is a moth in the family Crambidae. It was described by Koen V. N. Maes in 2002. It is found in Cameroon.
