= Ceramida baraudi =

Scientific classification
- Kingdom: Animalia
- Phylum: Arthropoda
- Class: Insecta
- Order: Coleoptera
- Suborder: Polyphaga
- Infraorder: Scarabaeiformia
- Family: Scarabaeidae
- Genus: Ceramida
- Species: C. baraudi

Binomial name
- Ceramida baraudi (Branco, 1981)

Synonyms
- Ceramida luisae López-Colón & Rodriguez-Arias, 1990; Elaphocera transtagana Branco, 1981; Elaphocera zuzartei Branco, 1981

Species of beetle

Ceramida baraudi is a species of beetle in the Melolonthinae subfamily that can be found in Portugal and Spain.
