= Orphnophanes thoasalis =

Scientific classification
- Kingdom: Animalia
- Phylum: Arthropoda
- Class: Insecta
- Order: Lepidoptera
- Family: Crambidae
- Genus: Orphnophanes
- Species: O. thoasalis

Binomial name
- Orphnophanes thoasalis (Walker, 1859)

Synonyms
- Botys thoasalis Walker, 1859

Species of moth

Orphnophanes thoasalis is a moth in the family Crambidae. It was described by Francis Walker in 1859. It is found on Borneo.
