= Ceramida dinizi =

Scientific classification
- Kingdom: Animalia
- Phylum: Arthropoda
- Class: Insecta
- Order: Coleoptera
- Suborder: Polyphaga
- Infraorder: Scarabaeiformia
- Family: Scarabaeidae
- Genus: Ceramida
- Species: C. dinizi

Binomial name
- Ceramida dinizi (Branco, 1981)

Synonyms
- Elaphocera dinizi Branco, 1981

Species of beetle

Ceramida dinizi is a species of beetle in the Melolonthinae subfamily that is endemic to Portugal.
