= Neargyractis alemundalis =

Scientific classification
- Kingdom: Animalia
- Phylum: Arthropoda
- Class: Insecta
- Order: Lepidoptera
- Family: Crambidae
- Genus: Neargyractis
- Species: N. alemundalis

Binomial name
- Neargyractis alemundalis (Schaus, 1924)

Synonyms
- Argyractis alemundalis Schaus, 1924

Species of moth

Neargyractis alemundalis is a species of moth in the family Crambidae. It was described by Schaus in 1924. It is found in Costa Rica.
