= Neargyractis serapionalis =

Scientific classification
- Kingdom: Animalia
- Phylum: Arthropoda
- Class: Insecta
- Order: Lepidoptera
- Family: Crambidae
- Genus: Neargyractis
- Species: N. serapionalis

Binomial name
- Neargyractis serapionalis (Schaus, 1924)

Synonyms
- Argyractis serapionalis Schaus, 1924

Species of moth

Neargyractis serapionalis is a species of moth in the family Crambidae. It was described by Schaus in 1924. It is found in Guatemala.
