= Crypsiptya megaptyona =

Scientific classification
- Kingdom: Animalia
- Phylum: Arthropoda
- Class: Insecta
- Order: Lepidoptera
- Family: Crambidae
- Genus: Crypsiptya
- Species: C. megaptyona

Binomial name
- Crypsiptya megaptyona (Hampson, 1918)

Synonyms
- Crocidophora megaptyona Hampson, 1918

Species of moth

Crypsiptya megaptyona is a moth in the family Crambidae. It was described by George Hampson in 1918. It is found in Malawi, Mozambique and Tanzania.
