= Ocnogyna anatolica =

Scientific classification
- Kingdom: Animalia
- Phylum: Arthropoda
- Clade: Pancrustacea
- Class: Insecta
- Order: Lepidoptera
- Superfamily: Noctuoidea
- Family: Erebidae
- Subfamily: Arctiinae
- Genus: Ocnogyna
- Species: O. anatolica

Binomial name
- Ocnogyna anatolica Witt, 1980

Species of moth

Ocnogyna anatolica is a moth of the family Erebidae. It was described by Thomas Joseph Witt in 1980. It is found in Turkey.
