= Ocnogyna nogelli =

Scientific classification
- Domain: Eukaryota
- Kingdom: Animalia
- Phylum: Arthropoda
- Class: Insecta
- Order: Lepidoptera
- Superfamily: Noctuoidea
- Family: Erebidae
- Subfamily: Arctiinae
- Genus: Ocnogyna
- Species: O. nogelli

Binomial name
- Ocnogyna nogelli Lederer, 1865

Synonyms
- Ocnogyna parasita nogelli Lederer, 1865

Species of moth

Ocnogyna nogelli is a moth of the family Erebidae. It was described by Julius Lederer in 1865. It is found in Asia Minor.
