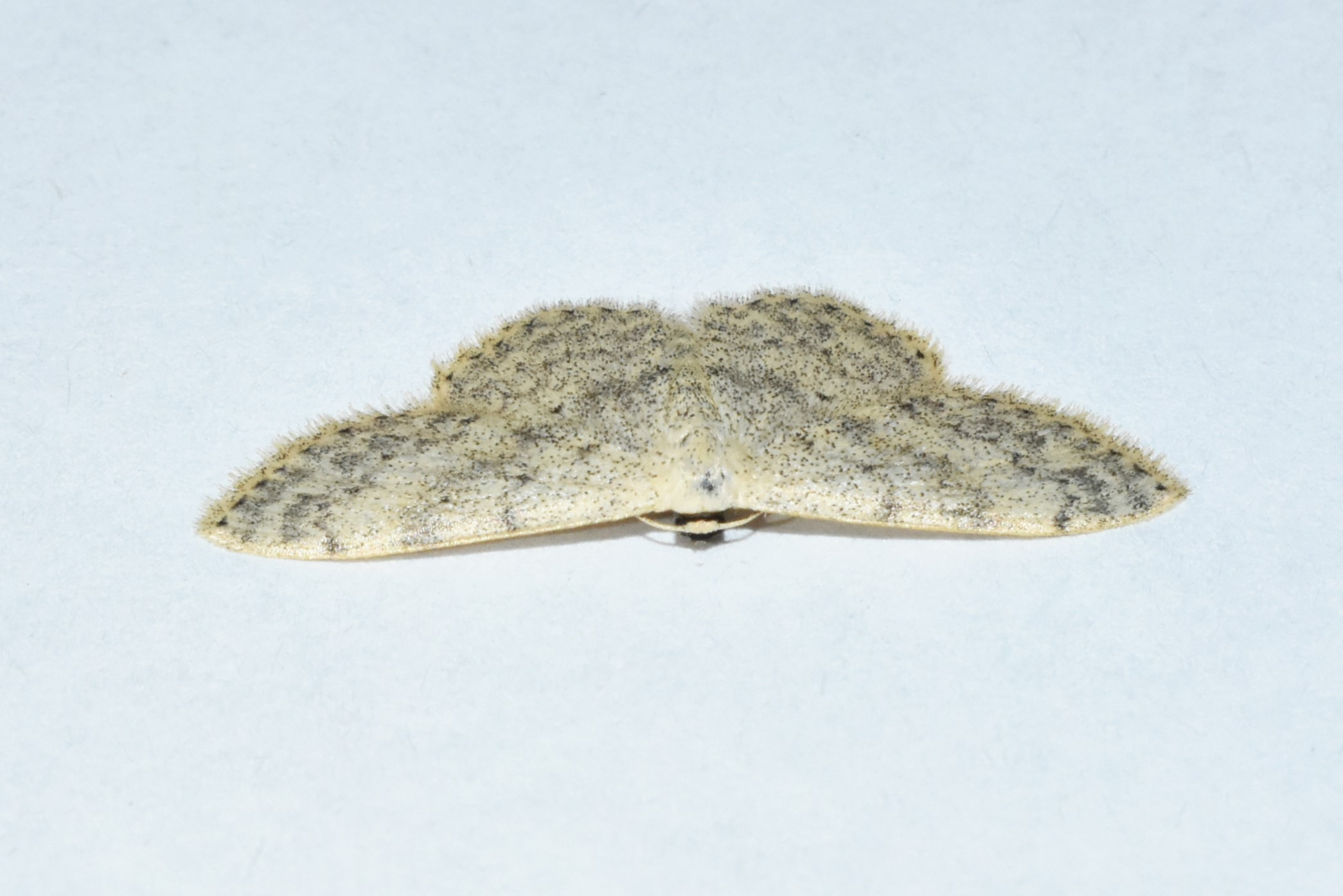

Scientific classification
- Kingdom: Animalia
- Phylum: Arthropoda
- Clade: Pancrustacea
- Class: Insecta
- Order: Lepidoptera
- Family: Geometridae
- Genus: Scopula
- Species: S. beckeraria

Binomial name
- Scopula beckeraria (Lederer, 1853)

Synonyms
- Acidalia beckeraria Lederer, 1853; Acidalia amataria Wehrli, 1927; Scopula agraria Rebel, 1908 (preocc. de Joannis, 1891); Scopula assimilaria Prout 1913; Acidalia rebeli Prout, 1913

= Scopula beckeraria =

Species of geometer moth in subfamily Sterrhinae

Scopula beckeraria is a moth of the family Geometridae. It was described by Julius Lederer in 1853. It is found in Italy, Croatia, North Macedonia, Greece, Bulgaria, Romania, Ukraine, Russia, Turkey, Armenia, Israel, Lebanon, Iran, Turkmenistan and Kazakhstan.

== Subspecies ==
- Scopula beckeraria beckeraria (southern Russia)
- Scopula beckeraria amataria (Wehrli, 1927) (Siberia)
- Scopula beckeraria assimilaria Prout, 1913 (Siberia, Turkmenistan, Kazakhstan)
- Scopula beckeraria hermonicola Hausmann, 1997 (Israel, Lebanon, Iran)
- Scopula beckeraria rebeli (Prout, 1913) (Balkan, Turkey and Armenia)
