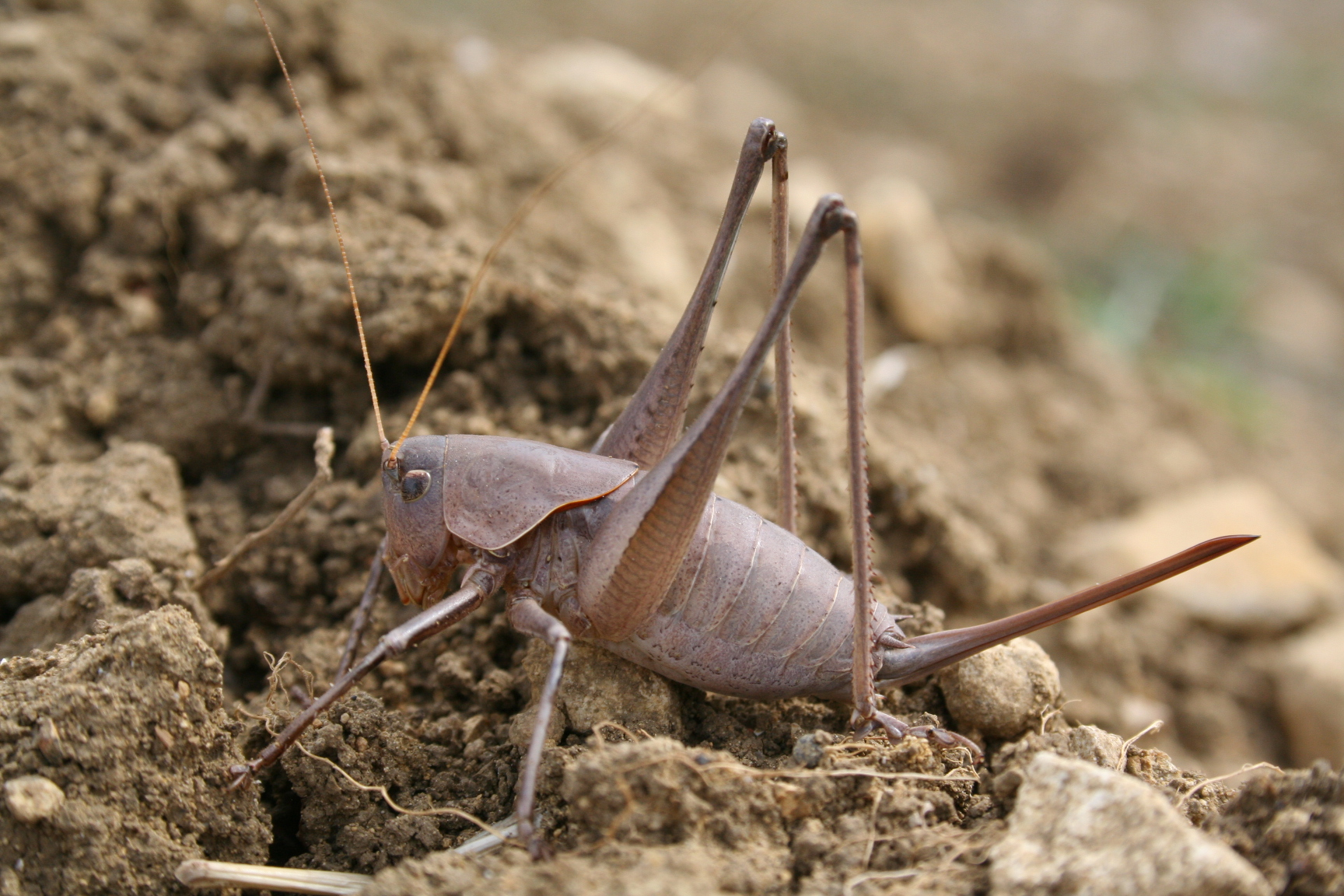
- Thyreonotus corsicus female

Scientific classification
- Domain: Eukaryota
- Kingdom: Animalia
- Phylum: Arthropoda
- Class: Insecta
- Order: Orthoptera
- Suborder: Ensifera
- Family: Tettigoniidae
- Subfamily: Tettigoniinae
- Tribe: Tettigoniini
- Genus: Thyreonotus; Serville, 1838

Synonyms
- Tyreonotus Navás, 1904

= Thyreonotus =

Genus of cricket-like animals

External image
- Images at iNaturalist

Thyreonotus is a genus of European bush crickets in the tribe Tettigoniini, erected by Jean Guillaume Audinet-Serville in 1838. The recorded distribution of this genus is the Iberian Peninsula and France, including Corsica.

== Species ==
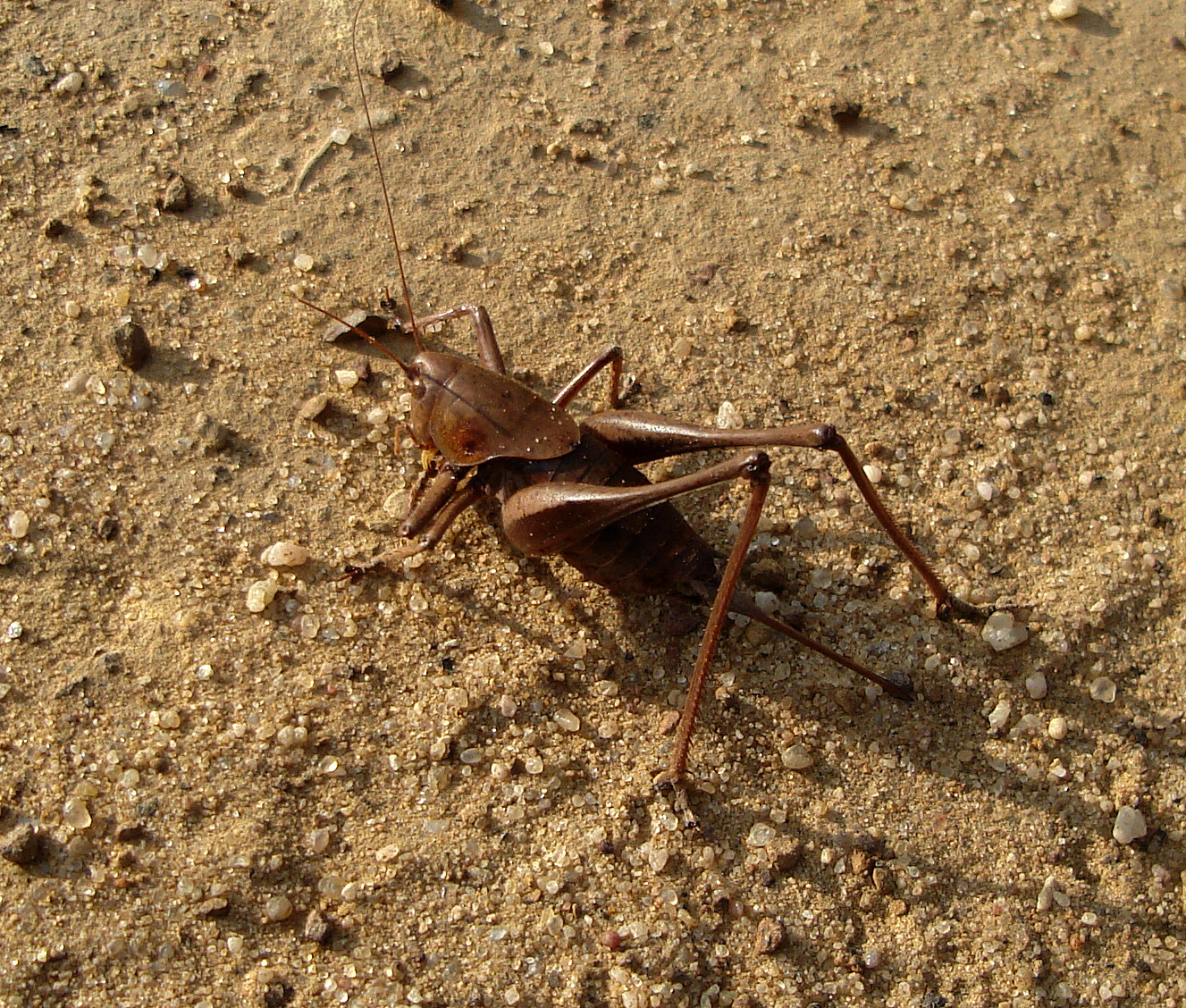
Thyreonotus bidens

The Orthoptera Species File includes:

1. Thyreonotus bidens (Bolívar, 1887)
2. Thyreonotus corsicus Rambur, 1838 - type species (= T. corsicus corsicus: one of 2 subspecies, by subsequent designation)
