= Crypsiptya =

Scientific classification
- Domain: Eukaryota
- Kingdom: Animalia
- Phylum: Arthropoda
- Class: Insecta
- Order: Lepidoptera
- Family: Crambidae
- Subfamily: Pyraustinae
- Genus: Crypsiptya; Meyrick, 1894

Synonyms
- Coclebotys Munroe & Mutuura, 1969

Genus of moths

Crypsiptya is a genus of moths of the family Crambidae.

== Species ==
- Crypsiptya africalis Maes, 2002
- Crypsiptya coclesalis Walker, 1859
- Crypsiptya megaptyona Hampson, 1918
- Crypsiptya mutuuri (Rose & Pajni, 1979)
- Crypsiptya nereidalis Lederer, 1863
- Crypsiptya ruficostalis Hampson, 1918
- Crypsiptya viettalis Marion, 1956
