= Ocnogyna mutabilis =

Scientific classification
- Domain: Eukaryota
- Kingdom: Animalia
- Phylum: Arthropoda
- Class: Insecta
- Order: Lepidoptera
- Superfamily: Noctuoidea
- Family: Erebidae
- Subfamily: Arctiinae
- Genus: Ocnogyna
- Species: O. mutabilis

Binomial name
- Ocnogyna mutabilis Turati, 1924

Synonyms
- Ocnogyna fuscipuncta Turati, 1934

Species of moth

Ocnogyna mutabilis is a moth of the family Erebidae. It was described by Turati in 1924. It is found in North Africa.
