= Orphnophanes laevalis =

Scientific classification
- Domain: Eukaryota
- Kingdom: Animalia
- Phylum: Arthropoda
- Class: Insecta
- Order: Lepidoptera
- Family: Crambidae
- Genus: Orphnophanes
- Species: O. laevalis

Binomial name
- Orphnophanes laevalis (Warren, 1896)

Synonyms
- Paraponyx laevalis Warren, 1896

Species of moth

Orphnophanes laevalis is a moth in the family Crambidae. It was described by Warren in 1896. It is found in India.
