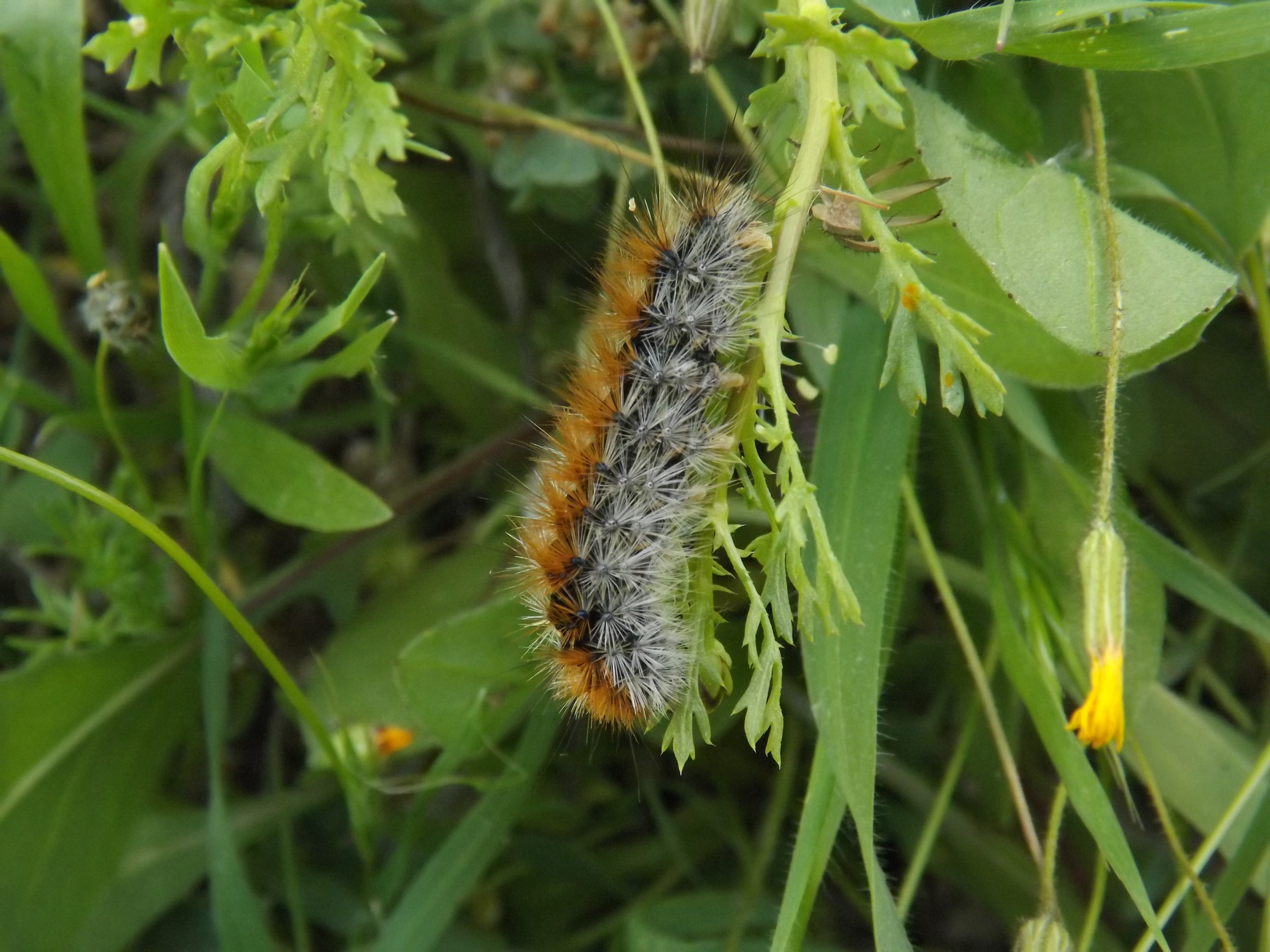
- Caterpillar in Beit Guvrin National Park

Scientific classification
- Kingdom: Animalia
- Phylum: Arthropoda
- Clade: Pancrustacea
- Class: Insecta
- Order: Lepidoptera
- Superfamily: Noctuoidea
- Family: Erebidae
- Subfamily: Arctiinae
- Genus: Ocnogyna
- Species: O. loewii

Binomial name
- Ocnogyna loewii (Zeller, 1846)

Synonyms
- Trichosoma loewii Zeller, 1846; Ocnogyna loewii f. andresi Draudt, 1931; Ocnogyna loewii daghestana Dubatolov, 1996

= Ocnogyna loewii =

Species of moth

Ocnogyna loewii is a moth of the family Erebidae. It was described by Philipp Christoph Zeller in 1846. It is found in Asia Minor, Cyprus, Near East, Armenia, Azerbaijan, Daghestan, southern Uzbekistan, south-western Tajikistan, northern Iran and Afghanistan.

The wingspan is 27–28 mm. Adults are on wing from March to May.

The larvae feed Achillea, Chrysanthemum, Cirsium, Onopordum and Trifolium species.

== Subspecies ==
- Ocnogyna loewii loewii (Asia Minor, Near East)
- Ocnogyna loewii armena Staudinger, 1871 (Armenia, Azerbaijan, Daghestan)
- Ocnogyna loewii pallidior Christoph, 1884 (Kopet Dagh, Badhyz, southern Uzbekistan, south-western Tajikistan, northern Iran, Afghanistan)
