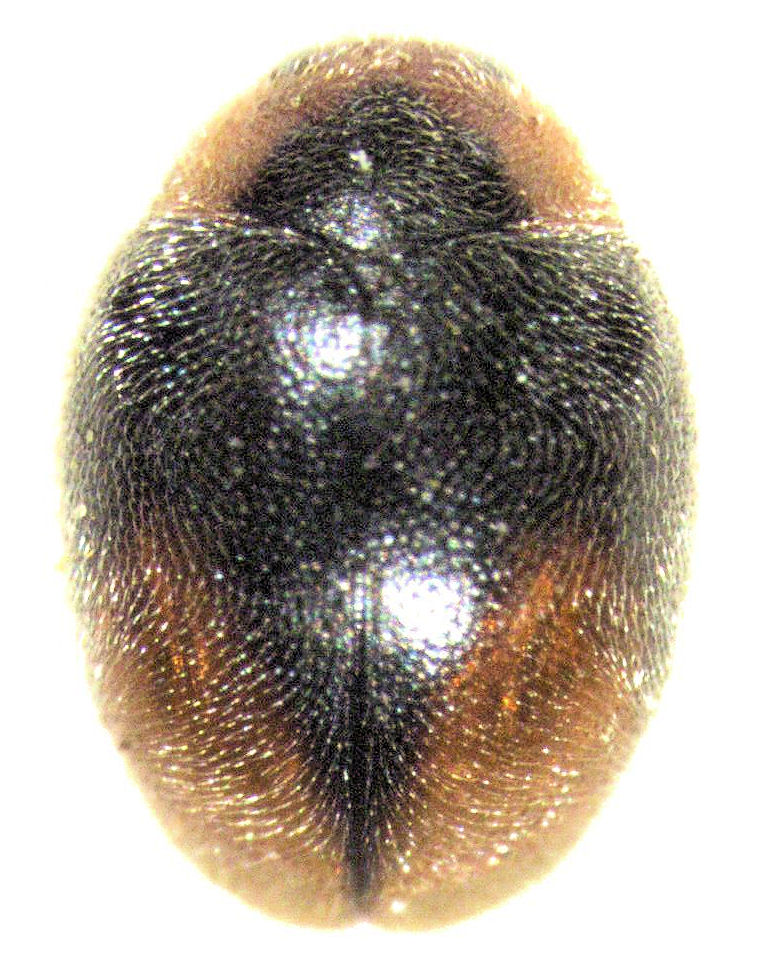
- adult Scymnus loewi, dorsal view, length about 1.8 mm.

Scientific classification
- Kingdom: Animalia
- Phylum: Arthropoda
- Clade: Pancrustacea
- Class: Insecta
- Order: Coleoptera
- Suborder: Polyphaga
- Infraorder: Cucujiformia
- Family: Coccinellidae
- Genus: Scymnus
- Species: S. loewii

Binomial name
- Scymnus loewii Mulsant, 1850

Synonyms
- Scymnus cinctus LeConte, 1852; Scymnus suturalis LeConte, 1852 (preocc.); Scymnus lecontii Crotch, 1874; Scymnus flebilis Horn, 1895: 100; Scymnus (Pullus) nubes Casey, 1899; Scymnus (Pullus) sarpedon Casey, 1899; Scymnus scotti Nunenmacher, 1934

= Scymnus loewii =

Species of beetle

Scymnus loewii, or Loew's lady beetle, is a species of dusky lady beetle in the family Coccinellidae. It is found in Central America, North America, and Oceania.

== Description ==
Adults reach a length of about 1.7-2.3 mm. Adults are reddish brown. The pronotum has a black spot that extends to the base of the elytron.
