= Adolphe Hercule de Graslin =

French entomologist (1802–1882)

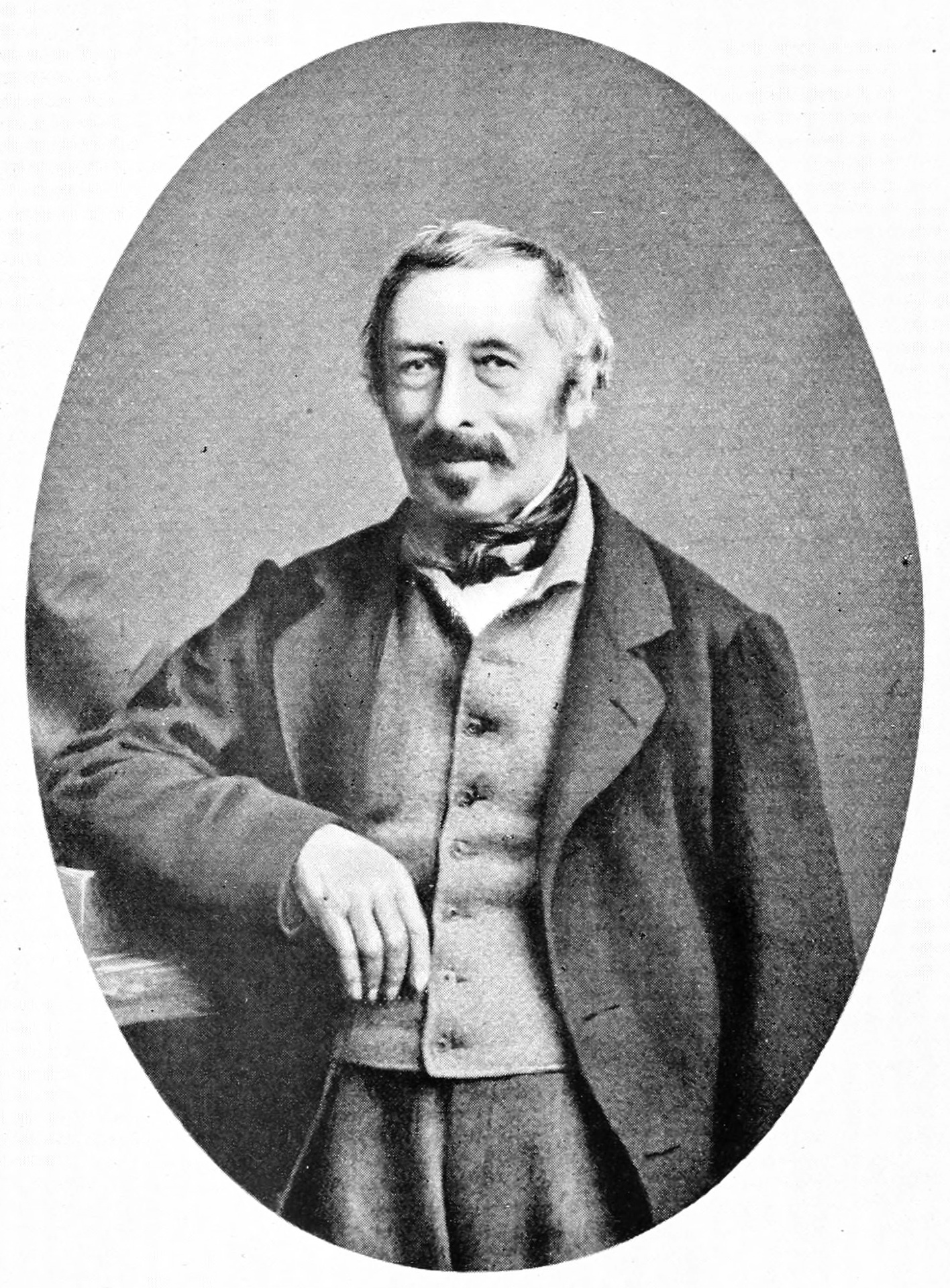
Adolphe Hercule de Graslin

Adolphe Hercule de Graslin (11 April 1802, Chateaux de Malitourne, Flée, Sarthe – 31 May 1882, Malitourne) was a French entomologist.

Adolphe Hercule de Graslin specialised in Lepidoptera. He was a founding member of the Société Entomologique de France. His collection was acquired by Charles Oberthür.

== Works ==
With Jean Alphonse Boisduval and Jules Pierre Rambur, he wrote Collection iconographique et historique des chenilles; ou, Description et figures des chenilles d'Europe, avec l'histoire de leurs métamorphoses, et des applications à l'agriculture, Paris, Librairie encyclopédique de Roret, 1832.
