= Nicolas Roret =

French editor and publisher

Nicolas-Edme Roret (29 May 1797 Vendeuvre-sur-Barse Département – 18 June 1860, Paris) was a French editor and publisher known for an important series of manuals (Manuels) and encyclopaedias.

== Sources ==
- Articles and reviews:
  - Bulletin des Bibliothèques de France : 1997 - Paris, t. 42, n° 02.
- Seminars and colloquia:
  - Le Vitrail et les traités du Moyen Âge à nos jours. Corpus Vitrearum. XXIIIe colloque international. Tours 3-7 Juillet 2006.
