= Jules Pierre Rambur =

French entomologist (1801–1870)

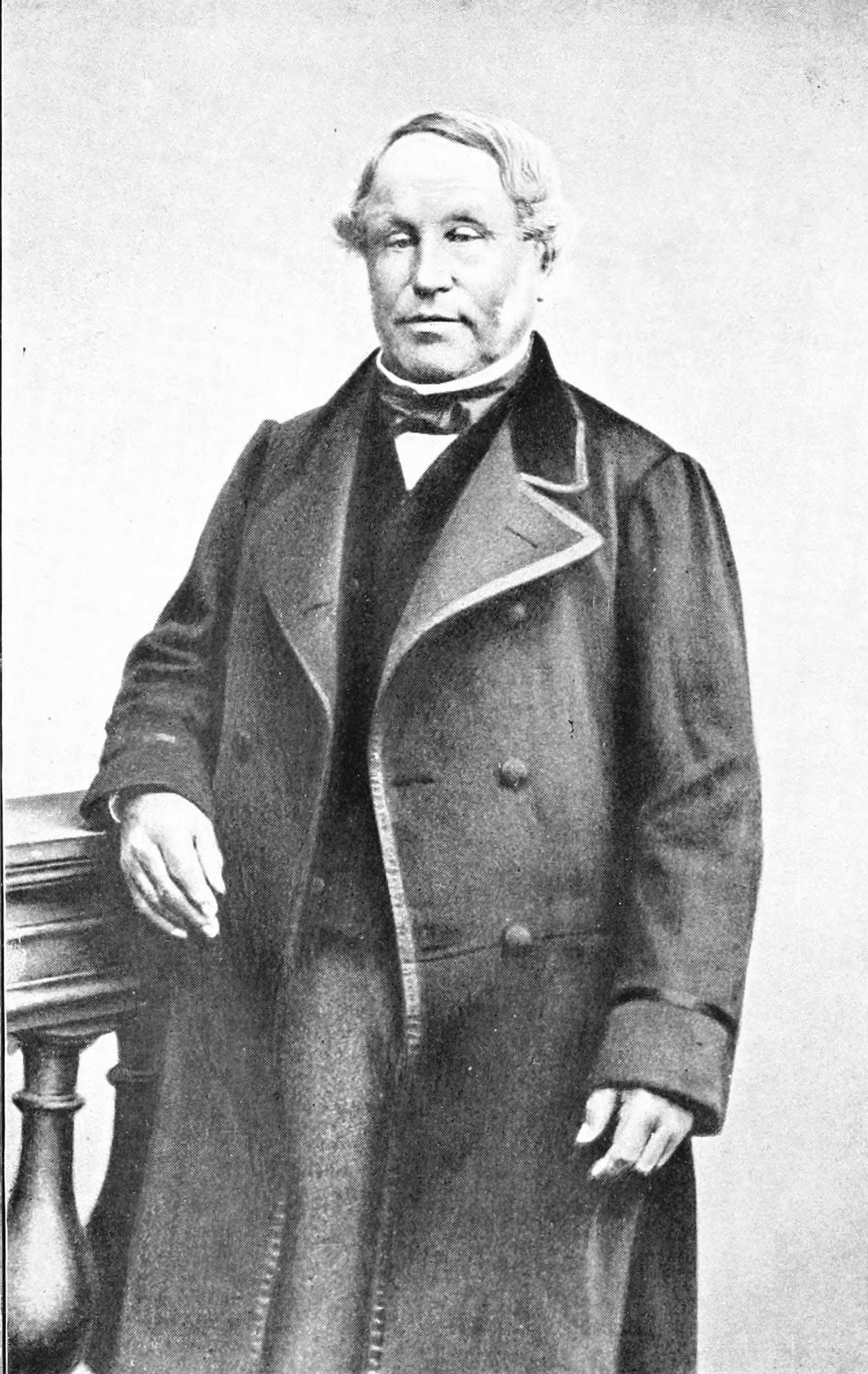
Jules Pierre Rambur

Jules Pierre Rambur (French pronunciation: [ʒyl pjɛʁ ʁɑ̃byʁ]; 21 July 1801 – 10 August 1870) was a French entomologist.

Rambur was born in Chinon. He studied the insect fauna of Corsica and Andalusia. He was the author of Histoire naturelle des insectes (1842) amongst other works. He died in Geneva.

He was a Member and later (1839) President of the Société entomologique de France.

== Publications ==
- Catalogue des lépidoptères insectes Néuroptères de l'île de Corse (1832)
- Faune entomologique de l'Andalousie (two volumes, 1837–1840)
- Histoire naturelle des insectes (part of the Suites à Buffon, 1842)
- Catalogue systématique des Lépidoptères de l'Andalousie (1858–1866).
- with Adolphe Hercule de Graslin and Jean Baptiste Boisduval Collection iconographique et historique des chenilles; ou, Description et figures des chenilles d'Europe, avec l'histoire de leurs métamorphoses, et des applications à l'agriculture Paris, Librairie encyclopédique de Roret, 1832.

== Sources ==
- Jean Gouillard (2004). Histoire des entomologistes français, 1750–1950. Édition entièrement revue et augmentée. Boubée (Paris), 287 p.
- Jean Lhoste (1987). Les Entomologistes français. 1750–1950. INRA Éditions.
