= Julius Lederer =

Austrian entomologist (1821–1870)

- Julius Lederer
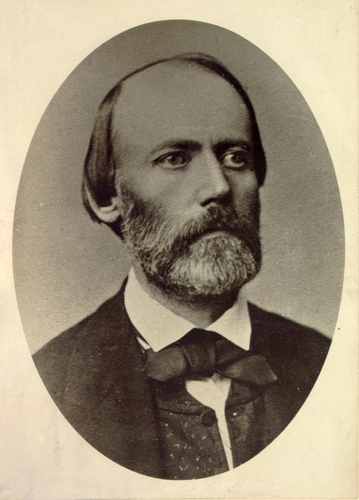
- Born: June 28, 1821; Vienna
- Died: April 30, 1870; Vienna
- Citizenship: Holy Roman Empire, Austrian Empire
- Scientific career
- Fields: Lepidopterology

Julius Lederer (24 June 1821 in Vienna – 30 April 1870 in Vienna) was an Austrian entomologist who specialised in Lepidoptera. He travelled widely: to Andalusia in 1849 Carinthia with Johann von Hornig (1819–1886) in 1853. He then traveled to various places in the Ottoman Empire such as İzmir in 1864, Magnesia in 1865, Amasya and in 1866, Mersin and the Taurus Mountains in 1867, Lebanon in 1868 and the Balkans in 1870).

== Works ==
- Beitrag zur Schmetterlings-Fauna von Cypern, Beirut und einem Theile Klein-Asiens, Wien 1855, Biodiversity Heritage Library
