= Eusebio (name) =

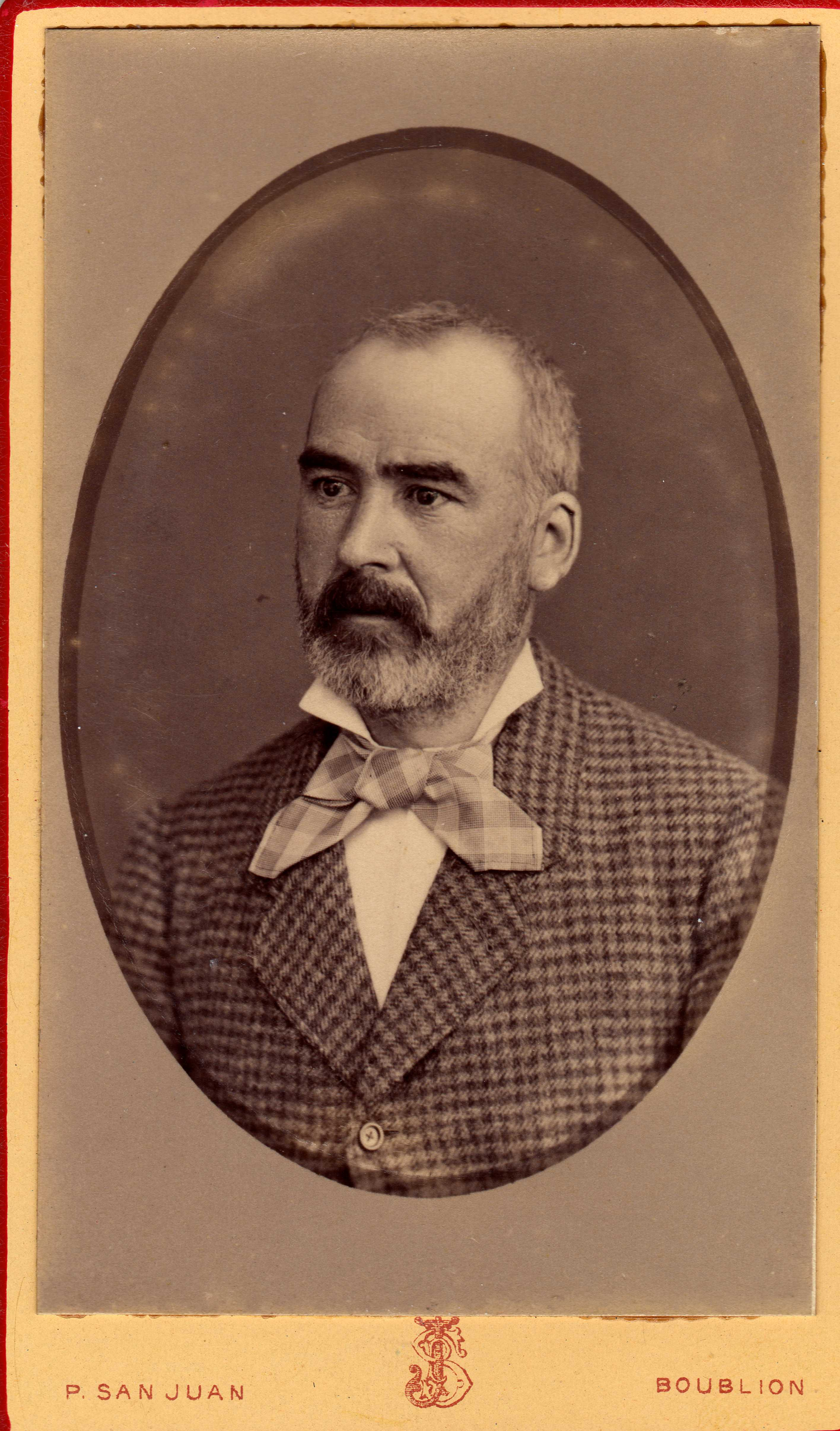
Eusebio Ollo Miranda

Eusebio or Eusébio is both a Spanish and Portuguese masculine given name and surname. Notable people with the name include:

== Given name ==
- Antônio Eusébio da Costa Rodrigues (1915–1989), Brazilian politician and physician
- Ático Eusébio da Rocha (1882–1950), Brazilian archbishop
- Carlos Eusebio de Ayo (c. 1830–c. 1910), Puerto Rican politician
- Édgar Eusebio Millán Gómez (1967–2008), Mexican police agent
- Eusébio (footballer, born 1966), Portuguese former footballer
- Eusebio (Spanish footballer) (born 1964), Spanish footballer
- Eusebio Acasuzo (born 1952), Peruvian former footballer
- Eusebio Acea (born 1969), Cuban Olympian rower
- Eusebio Anglora y Chaban (1832–1875), Spanish writer
- Eusebio Antonio Morales (1865–1929), Panamanian politician, writer, and lawyer
- Eusebio Antoñanzas (1770–1814), Venezuelan royalist
- Eusebio Asquerino (1822–1892), Spanish romantic era poet and playwright
- Eusebio Ayala (1875–1942), two-term president of Paraguay
- Eusébio Bancessi (born 1995), Bissau-Guinean footballer
- Eusebio Bardají y Azara (1776–1842), Spanish Minister of Foreign Affairs
- Eusebio Bastida (1909–1986), Spanish cyclist
- Eusebio Bejarano (born 1948), Spanish former footballer
- Eusebio Benajes y Cots, Spanish writer
- Eusebio Bertrand (1930–2011), Spanish Olympian sailor
- Eusebio Blankendal (born 1998), Bermudian footballer
- Eusebio Blasco (1844–1903), Spanish journalist, poet, and playwright
- Eusebio Borrero (1790–1853), Colombian military figure and politician
- Eusebio Cáceres (born 1991), Spanish track and field athlete
- Eusebio Calonge (1813–1873), Spanish politician
- Eusebio Calonge (dramatist) (born 1964), dramatist
- Eusebio Calzada, Mexican revolutionary
- Eusebio Cano Pinto (1940–2020), Spanish politician
- Eusebio Canabal (1784–1856), Spanish politician and lawyer
- Eusebio Cañas, Spanish Jesuit
- Eusebio Cardoso (1950–2018), Paraguayan Olympian long-distance runner
- Eusébio Cardoso Martins (1944–1984), Portuguese poet
- Eusebio Castelo Serra (1825–1892), Spanish physician
- Eusebio Castigliano (1921–1949), Italian footballer
- Eusebio Castillo (1834–1897), Governor of Tabasco, Mexico
- Eusebio Chamorro (born 1922), Argentine former footballer
- Eusebio Chelli (1820–1890), Italian architect
- Eusebio Cimorra (1908–2007), Spanish writer and journalist
- Eusebio Corominas (1849–1928), Spanish politician and journalist
- Eusebio Coterillo (1889–1975), Spanish naval architect
- Eusebio Cuerno de la Cantolla (1850–1922), Spanish businessman and theatrical writer
- Eusebio da San Giorgio (c. 1470–c. 1550), Italian Renaissance painter
- Eusébio da Veiga (1718–1798), Portuguese astronomer
- Eusebio de Herrera y Rojas (1754–1834), Spanish military figure
- Eusebio de Letre, Spanish lithographer
- Eusébio da Silva Ferreira (1942–2014), Portuguese footballer
- Eusébio de Sousa (1883–1947), Brazilian historian, poet, and journalist
- Eusébio de Sousa Soares (1766–1820), Brazilian military engineer and cartographer
- Eusebio Dávalos Hurtado (1909–1968), Mexican anthropologist and homeopath
- Eusebio Delfín (1893–1965), Cuban banker and musician
- Eusebio de Almeida (born 1985), East Timorese footballer
- Eusebio de Gorbea Lemmi (1881–1948), Spanish writer and soldier
- Eusebio de Granito, Bishop of Capri
- Eusébio de Matos (1629–1692), Portuguese orator, painter, and poet
- Eusébio de Oliveira (1883–1939), Brazilian engineer and geologist
- Eusébio de Queirós (1812–1868), Brazilian Minister of Justice
- Eusébio de Queirós Coutinho da Silva (1781–1842), Brazilian politician and magistrate
- Eusebio del Pozo Díaz (1772–1844), Chilean priest
- Eusebio Di Francesco (born 1969), Italian former footballer
- Eusébio Dias Poças Falcão (1814–1870), Portuguese politician and lawyer
- Eusebio Díaz (1898–1959), Paraguayan footballer
- Eusebio Díaz (Chilean footballer) (born 1986), Chilean footballer
- Eusebio Donoso Cortés (1823–1881), Spanish politician
- Eusebio Escalante Bates (1840–c. 1920), Mexican industrialist and banker
- Eusebio Escobar (born 1936), Colombian former footballer
- Eusebio Estada (1843–1917), Spanish civil engineer
- Eusebio Fernández Ardavín (1898–1965), Spanish screenwriter and director
- Eusebio Fernández García (born 1952), Spanish jurist
- Eusebio Fernández Cuesta y Palafox (1847–1885), Spanish painter
- Eusebio Figueroa Oreamuno (1827–1883), Costa Rican politician
- Eusébio Francisco de Andrade (1866–1928), Brazilian politician
- Eusebio Freixa y Rabassó (1824–1894), Spanish writer and publicist
- Eusebio Gómez (1883–1954), Argentine judge and criminalist
- Eusebio García Alonso (1890–1964), Spanish urologist
- Eusebio García González (1927–2017), Spanish pedagogue, poet, and politician
- Eusebio García Luengo (1909–2003), Spanish literary critic, dramatist, and novelist
- Eusebio Giorno (1902–1969), Argentine pianist and composer
- Eusebio González Mayorga (1912–2014), Spanish politician and teacher
- Eusebio Grados (1953–2020), Peruvian huayano singer
- Eusebio Gregorio Ruzo (1795–1827), Governor of Catamarca, Argentina
- Eusebio da Guarda (1825–1897), Spanish businessman and philanthropist
- Eusebio Guilarte (1805–1849), 10th president of Bolivia
- Eusebio Guiñazú (born 1982), Argentine rugby union player
- Eusebio Guiñez (1906–1987), Argentine Olympian long-distance runner
- Eusebio Hereñú (1772–c. 1825), Argentine caudillo
- Eusebio "El Corcho" Hernández (1911–1997), Chilean basketball player
- Eusebio Hernández Pérez (1853–1933), Cuban eugenicist, obstetrician, and guerrilla
- Eusebio Hernández Sola (born 1944), Spanish bishop
- Eusebio Ibarra Camacho (born 1938), Spanish violinist
- Eusebio Jáuregui Nolasco (1895–1919), Mexican revolutionary
- Eusebio Jiménez (1897–?), Cuban baseball player
- Eusebio Juaristi (born 1950), Mexican researcher and academic
- Eusebio Jurczyszyn (born 1943), Argentine military figure
- Eusebio Juliá (1826–1895), Spanish photographer
- Eusebio Kino (1645–1711), Tyrolean Jesuit missionary
- Eusebio L. Elizondo Almaguer (born 1954), Mexican-born American Catholic prelate
- Eusebio Lázaro (born 1942), Spanish theatre and actor
- Eusebio Leal (1942–2020), Cuban historian
- Eusébio Leão (1864–1926), Portuguese politician and physician
- Eusebio Lillo (1826–1910), Chilean politician, poet, and journalist
- Eusebio López y Díaz de Quijano (1873–1937), Spanish polo rider
- Eusebio Lorenzo Baleirón (1962–1986), Spanish writer
- Eusébio Luciano Gomes da Silva (1763–1790), Brazilian bishop
- Eusebio Marcilla (1914–1954), Argentine auto racer
- Eusebio María del Valle (1799–1867), Spanish and economist and jurist
- Eusébio Marques de Carvalho, Portuguese politician
- Eusebio Martínez de Mollinedo (1794–1841), Argentine colonial
- Eusebio Martínez de Velasco (1836–1893), Spanish writer and journalist
- Eusebio Mateos Ortega (born 1955), Mexican artist
- Eusebio Mesa (born 1939), Spanish Olympian boxer
- Eusebio Millán (1886–1956), Spanish Piarist
- Eusebio Monzó (born 2000), Spanish footballer
- Eusebio Ocampo, Argentine politician
- Eusebio Ochoa (1880–1955), Spanish musician
- Eusebio Oehl (1827–1903), Italian histologist and physiologist
- Eusebio Ojeda (1912–1997), Chilean rower
- Eusebio Pedroza (1956–2019), Panamanian boxer
- Eusebio Peñalver Mazorra (1936–2006), Afro-Cuban anti-Castro political prisoner
- Eusebio Pérez Martín (1920–2007), Spanish Republican
- Eusebio Pérez Valluerca, Spanish costumbrista painter
- Eusébio Pinheiro Furtado (1777–1861), Portuguese soldier
- Eusebio Poncela (1945–2025), Spanish actor
- Eusebio Prieto y Ruiz (1808–1850), Costa Rican politician
- Eusebio Puello y Castro (1811–1873), Dominican general
- Eusebio Quiroz Paz-Soldán (1940–2023), Peruvian historian and professor
- Eusebio Razo Jr. (1966–2014), Mexican-born American jockey
- Eusebio Ríos (1935–2008), Spanish footballer
- Eusébio Rocha (1917–1995), Brazilian politician
- Eusebio Rodolfo Cordón Cea (1899–1966), Provisional President of El Salvador
- Eusebio Ruvalcaba (1951–2017), Mexican writer
- Eusebio Salazar (born 1952), former footballer
- Eusebio Salazar y Mazarredo (1827–1871), Spanish politician and diplomat
- Eusebio Sánchez Pareja (1716–1787), Interim Viceroy of New Spain
- Eusébio Sanjane (born 1988), Mozambican writer
- Eusebio Sanz Asensio, Spanish anarchist
- Eusébio Scheid (1932–2021), Brazilian cardinal
- Eusebio Sempere (1923–1985), Spanish sculptor, painter, and graphic artist
- Eusebio Serna (born 1961), Spanish wrestler
- Eusebio Siosi (born 1971), Wuyuu-Colombian plastic artist and architect
- Eusebio Subero (1833–1894), Spanish musician
- Eusebio Ramos Morales (born 1952), Puerto Rican bishop
- Eusébio Tamagnini (1880–1972), Portuguese anthropologist
- Eusebio Tejera (1922–2002), Uruguayan footballer
- Eusebio Unzué (born 1955), team manager of Movistar Team
- Eusebio Valdenegro (1783–1818), Rioplatanese soldier and poet
- Eusebio Valli (1755–1816), Italian physician and scientist
- Eusebio Vasco (1860–1939), Spanish historian and folklorist
- Eusebio Vela (1688–1737), Spanish playwright
- Eusebio Valdez, Mexican athlete
- Eusebio Ventura Beleña (1736–1794), Spanish jurist
- Eusebio Videla, Argentine footballer
- Eusebio Vélez (1935–2020), Spanish cyclist
- Eusebio Zubasti, Argentine politician
- Eusebio Zubizarreta (1865–1921), Spanish Carlist
- Eusebio Zarza (1842–1881), Spanish painter
- Eusebio Zuloaga (1808–1898), Spanish gunsmith
- Don Eusebio (died 1873), Argentine jester
- José Eusébio (1869–1925), Brazilian politician and magistrate
- José Eusebio Acosta (1824–1882), Venezuelan Liberal politician and military figure
- José Eusebio Agüero (1790–1864), Argentine priest and politician
- José Eusebio Barros Baeza (1810–1881), Chilean lawyer and politician
- José Eusebio Caro (1817–1853), Colombian writer, journalist, and politician
- José Eusebio Colombres (1778–1859), Argentine statesman and bishop
- José Eusebio de Llano Zapata (1721–1780), Peruvian scientist and writer
- José Eusebio Domínguez Suárez, Mexican revolutionary
- José Eusebio Magdonel, Governor of Tabasco, Mexico
- Juan Eusebio Balboa (1791–1856), Governor of Catamarca, Argentina
- Juan Eusebio Nieremberg (1595–1658), Spanish Jesuit
- José Eusebio Otalora (1826–1884), 16th president of the United States of Colombia
- José Eusebio Sánchez Pedraza (1823–1903), Peruvian politician
- Juan Eusebio Torrent (1834–1901), Argentine politician
- Mario Eusebio Mestril Vega (1940–2026), Cuban Roman Catholic bishop
- Pablo Eusebio Arguindeguy (1922–2014), Argentine historian and naval officer
- Ramón Castro Ruz, Cuban revolutionary and older brother of Fidel Castro

== Surname ==
- Adriano "Tino" Eusébio (born 1967), Santomean footballer
- Agustín Eusebio Fabre (1743–1820), Spanish physician
- Alexander Lee Eusebio (born 1988), Hong Kong-Macanese singer, rapper, actor and host
- Alexios Eusebios (born 1964), metropolitan of Calcutta Orthodox Diocese
- Alfredo Eusebio Gobbi (1877–1938), Uruguayan musician
- André Paulo (born 1996), Portuguese footballer
- António Maria Eusébio (1819–1911), Portuguese poet
- Bobby Eusebio (born 1968), Filipino politician and architect
- Carlos de Jesús Eusebio (1964–2010), Brazilian footballer
- Carlo Curisinche Eusebio (born 1971), Peruvian politician and lawyer
- Fernando Eusebio (born 1910), Italian former footballer
- Fineza Eusébio (born 1990), Angolan basketball player
- Gladys Eusebio, Peruvian karateka
- Ketchup Eusebio (born 1985), Filipino actor
- José de Almeida Eusébio (1881–1945), Portuguese politician, lawyer, and journalist
- José de Eusebio (born 1966), Spanish conductor and musicologist
- Robi Domingo (born 1989), Filipino actor and dancer
- Tony Eusebio (born 1967), American baseball player

== See also ==
- Eusebia (disambiguation)
- Eusebio (disambiguation)
