= Eusebius (disambiguation) =

Eusebius (263–339 AD) was a Christian exegete, historian and polemicist.

Eusebius may also refer to:

- Eusebius of Laodicea (died 268), bishop of Laodicea
- Pope Eusebius (died 310), Pope in 309 or 310
- Eusebius of Nicomedia (died 341), bishop of Berytus, Nicomedia and Constantinople, leader of Arianism
- Eusebius (consul 347) (died c. 350), Roman consul in 347
- Saint Eusebius of Rome (died 357), priest and martyr
- Eusebius (consul 359), Roman consul in 359
- Eusebius of Emesa (300–360), bishop of Emesa
- Eusebius (praepositus sacri cubiculi), under Constantius II (died 361 AD)
- Eusebius of Gaza (died c. 362), early Christian martyr
- Saint Eusebius of Vercelli (283–371), bishop of Vercelli, opponent of Arianism
- Saint Eusebius of Samosata (died 4th-century), bishop of Samosata
- Saint Eusebius the Hermit (4th century), solitary monk of Syria
- Eusebius of Myndus (4th century), Neoplatonist philosopher
- Eusebius (sophist) (4th century), Roman sophist
- Saint Eusebius of Cremona (died c. 423), monk, pre-congregational saint, and disciple of Jerome
- Saint Eusebius (bishop of Milan) (died 462), archbishop of Milan
- Eusebius (consul 489), Roman consul in 489 and 493
- Eusebius of Dorylaeum (5th century), bishop of Dorylaeum, opponent of Nestorianism and Monophysitism
- Eusebius, bishop of Paris until his death in 555
- Eusebius of Alexandria (6th century), Christian author
- Eusebius Gallicanus (6th century), Collection of homilies
- Eusebius of Thessalonika (6th or 7th century), bishop of Thessalonika during the time of Pope Gregory the Great
- Hwaetberht (died c. 740s), Abbot of Monkwearmouth-Jarrow Priory, who wrote under the pen-name of Eusebius
- Eusebius of Angers (died 1081), bishop of Angers
- Eusebius of Esztergom, c. 1200–1270) Hungarian priest, hermit, founder of the Order of Saint Paul the First Hermit
- Karl Eusebius of Liechtenstein (1611–1684), the second prince of Liechtenstein
- Eusebius, pen name of Edmund Rack (1735–1787)
- Eusebius, one of the personae of Robert Schumann (1810–1856)
- Eusebius Barnard (1802–1865), American minister and abolitionist
- Eusebius J. Beltran (1934–2025), American Catholic bishop

Eusebius is also the name of:

- Jerome (347–420), Christian scholar and church father, whose full name was Eusebius Sophronius Hieronymus

== See also ==
- Eusebia (disambiguation)
- Eusebio (disambiguation)
- Eusebeia (Greek: εὐσέβεια), a Greek philosophical and Biblical concept meaning inner piety, spiritual maturity, or godliness.
