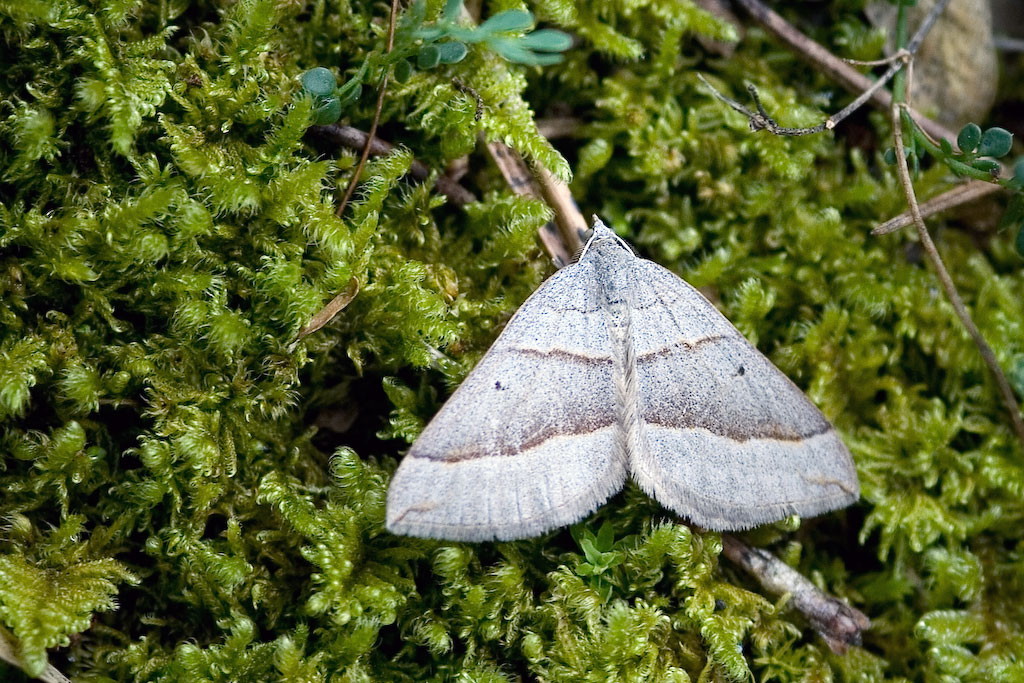

Scientific classification
- Domain: Eukaryota
- Kingdom: Animalia
- Phylum: Arthropoda
- Class: Insecta
- Order: Lepidoptera
- Family: Geometridae
- Genus: Scotopteryx
- Species: S. luridata

Binomial name
- Scotopteryx luridata (Hufnagel, 1767)

Synonyms
- Phalaena luridata Hufnagel, 1767; Phalaena plumbaria Fabricius, 1775

= Scotopteryx luridata =

July belle

Species of moth

Scotopteryx luridata, the July belle, is a species of moth in the family Geometridae. It is found in most of Europe, except Finland and the Baltic region. Further East it is found in Turkey, Georgia and Transcaucasia.

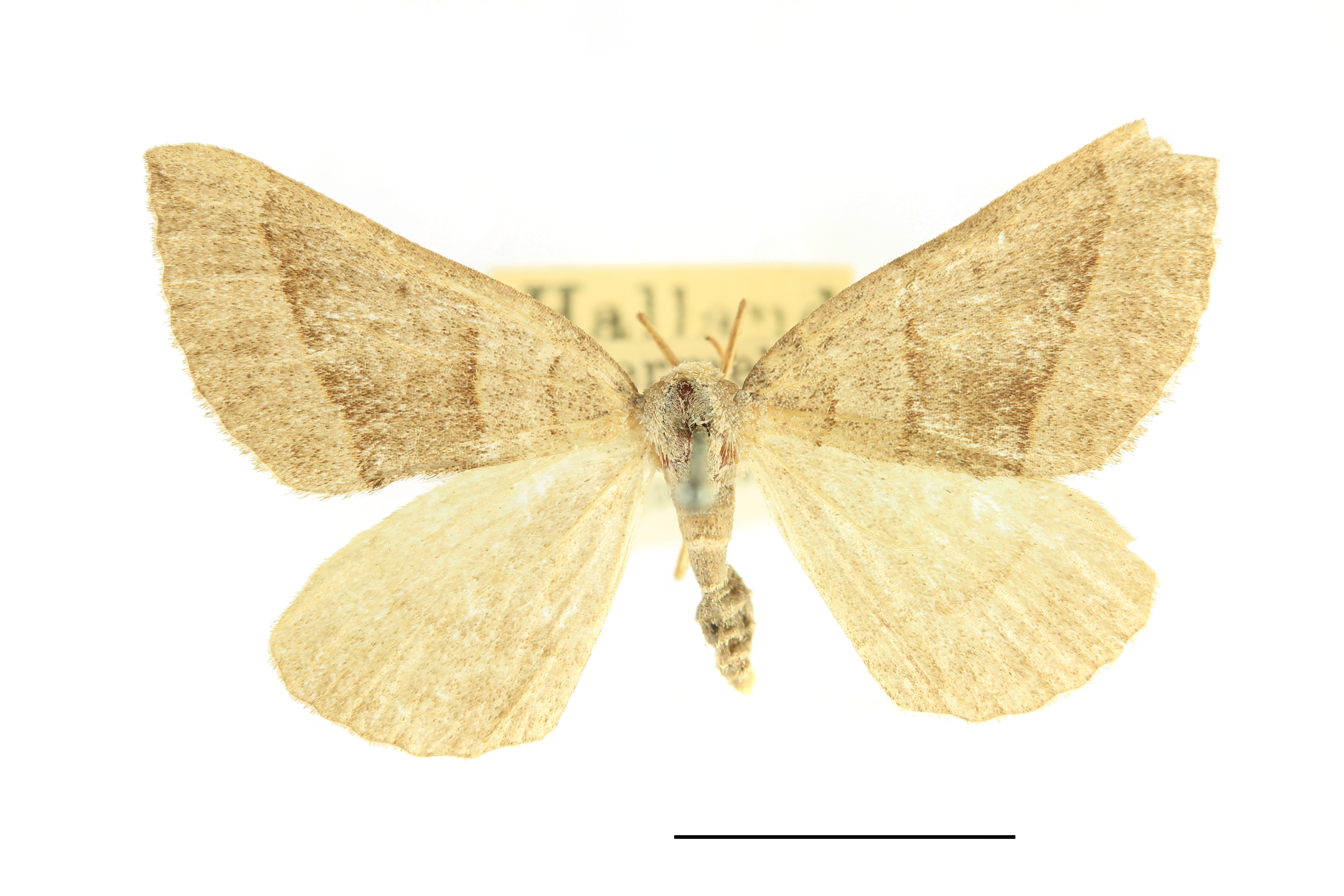
Museum specimen

The wingspan is 32–38 mm. The ground colour of the forewing is grey, with a middle darker band between two cross lines. The discal spot is in this band. Apical streak present. Very similar to Scotopteryx mucronata but the discal spot on the forewings lies closer to the antemedian line (inner line) than in mucronata and the hindwings are slightly darker and without markings.. See Townsend et al.

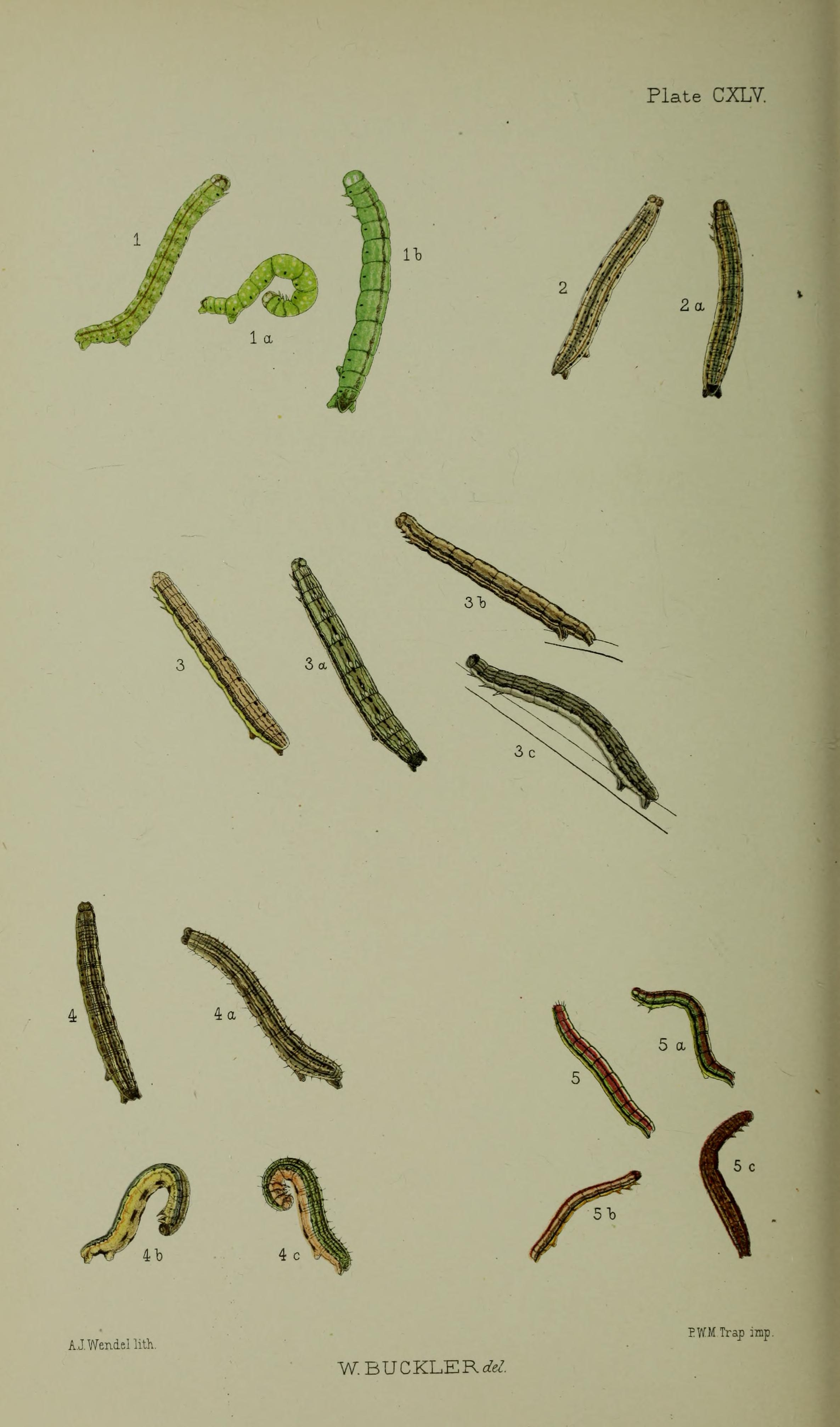
Figs.Figs 3, 3a, 3b, 3c larvae after final moult

The caterpillars are brightly coloured and have a brownish stripe pattern. Adults are on wing from June to August.

The larvae feed on Genista (including Genista anglica) and Ulex species. Larvae can be found from August to April. The species overwinters in the larval stage.

== Subspecies ==
- Scotopteryx luridata luridata
- Scotopteryx luridata plumbaria (Fabricius, 1775)
