= Eusebio (disambiguation) =

Eusébio (1942–2014) was a Portuguese footballer.

Eusebio or Eusébio may also refer to:

== People ==
- Eusebio (name)

== Places ==
=== Settlements ===
- Cayo Eusebio, Cuban island
- Eusébio, Ceará, Brazilian municipality
- Eusebio Ayala, Paraguay, Paraguayan city and district

=== Structures ===
- Avenida Eusebio Ayala, avenue in Asunción, Paraguay
- Calle Eusebio Estada, street in Palma de Mallorca, Spain
- Crypt of Sant'Eusebio, remanent of a church in Pavia, Italy
- Jose Eusebio Boronda Adobe, a Monterey colonial style California historical landmark
- Ponte Eusébio Matoso, bridge in Saão Paulo, Brazil
- Sant'Eusebio, church in Rome
- Statue of Eusebio Kino, bronze sculpture depicting Eusebio Kino

== Other ==
- Autódromo Eusebio Marcilla, motorsports circuit in Junín, Argentina
- Eusébio Cup, Portuguese football match hosted by S.L. Benfica
- Eusébio de Queirós Law, Brazilian law enacted in 1850 to abolish slavery
- Eusébio Macário, 1879 novel by Camilo Castelo Blanco
- KC Eusebio, action shooting competitor
- Premio Eusebio Lorenzo Baleirón, poetry prize of Dodro, Spain
- Trofeo Eusebio Vélez, Spanish amateur cycling event

== See also ==
- Eusebi (name)
- Eusebia (disambiguation)
- Eusebius (disambiguation)
