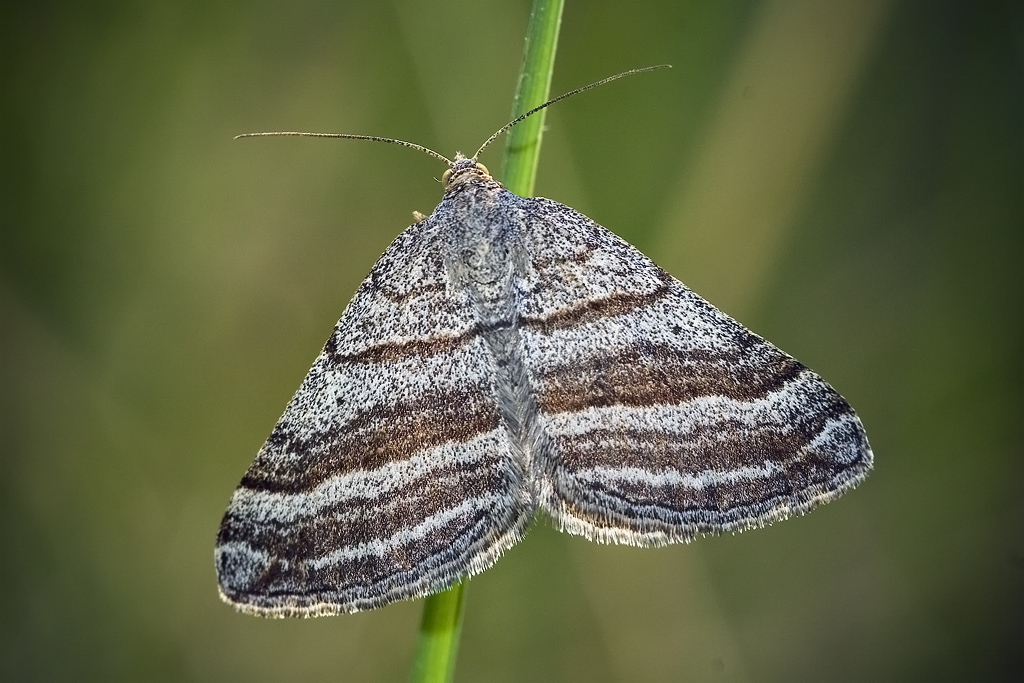

Scientific classification
- Domain: Eukaryota
- Kingdom: Animalia
- Phylum: Arthropoda
- Class: Insecta
- Order: Lepidoptera
- Family: Geometridae
- Genus: Scotopteryx
- Species: S. coarctaria

Binomial name
- Scotopteryx coarctaria (Denis & Schiffermüller, 1775)

Synonyms
- Geometra coarctaria Denis & Schiffermuller, 1775; Ortholitha coarctata; Geometra coarctata Fabricius, 1794

= Scotopteryx coarctaria =

Species of moth

Scotopteryx coarctaria is a species of moth in the family Geometridae. It is found in most of Europe, except Ireland, Great Britain, Portugal, Belgium, Fennoscandia and the Baltic region. It has also been recorded from Turkey and Kazakhstan. There are probably two generations per year.

The larvae feed on Genista and Cytisus species. The species overwinters in the larval stage.
