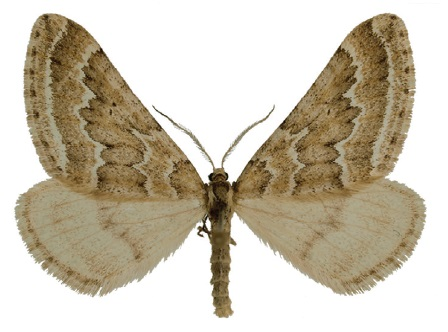

Scientific classification
- Domain: Eukaryota
- Kingdom: Animalia
- Phylum: Arthropoda
- Class: Insecta
- Order: Lepidoptera
- Family: Geometridae
- Genus: Scotopteryx
- Species: S. kuznetzovi

Binomial name
- Scotopteryx kuznetzovi (Wardikian, 1957)

= Scotopteryx kuznetzovi =

Species of moth

Scotopteryx kuznetzovi is a species of moth of the family Geometridae. It was first described by C. A. Wardikian in 1957. It is found in Iran and Turkey.
