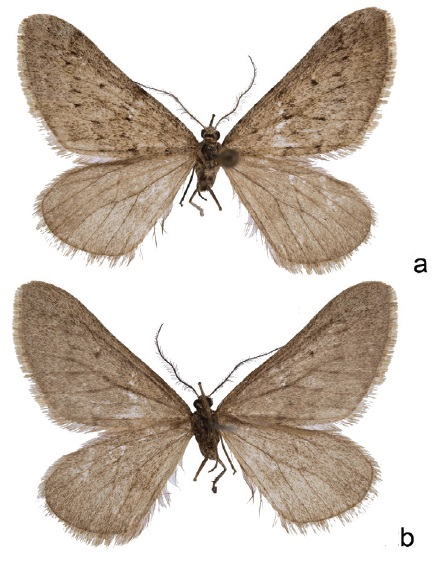
- a. dorsal view, b. ventral view

Scientific classification
- Domain: Eukaryota
- Kingdom: Animalia
- Phylum: Arthropoda
- Class: Insecta
- Order: Lepidoptera
- Family: Geometridae
- Genus: Scotopteryx
- Species: S. kurmanjiana

Binomial name
- Scotopteryx kurmanjiana Rajaei & László, 2014

= Scotopteryx kurmanjiana =

Species of moth

Scotopteryx kurmanjiana is a species of moth of the family Geometridae first described by Hossein Rajaei and Gyula M. László in 2014. It is found on both sides of Kopet-Dagh Mountains in north-eastern Iran and southern Turkmenistan.

The wingspan is 28–33 mm. The ground colour of the forewings is pale greyish brown. The basal area and medial band slightly darker, edged with dark brown. The medial line is shadow like and poorly visible, and the median area is uniformly pale greyish brown. There is a small, blackish discal spot. The hindwings are cream brown with a small discal spot. Adults have been recorded on wing in late autumn.

== Etymology ==
The species is named for Kurmanj people in north-eastern Iran.
