= Eusebi =

Eusebi is a Catalan masculine given name and Italian surname, both deriving from Eusebio. Notable people with the name include:

Given name

- Eusebi Güell (1846–1918), Catalan entrepreneur
- Eusebi Planas (1833–1897), Catalan graphic artist, lithographer and watercolorist
- Eusebi Rodríguez Salas, Spanish Commissar-General of the police forces of Catalonia

Surname

- Enzo Eusebi (born 1960), Italian engineer, architect and designer
- Renzo Eusebi (born 1946), Italian painter and sculptor
