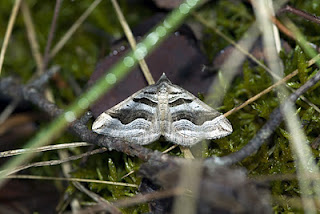

Scientific classification
- Kingdom: Animalia
- Phylum: Arthropoda
- Clade: Pancrustacea
- Class: Insecta
- Order: Lepidoptera
- Family: Geometridae
- Genus: Scotopteryx
- Species: S. peribolata

Binomial name
- Scotopteryx peribolata (Hübner, 1817)

Synonyms
- Geometra peribolata Hübner, 1817

= Scotopteryx peribolata =

Spanish carpet

Species of moth

Scotopteryx peribolata, the Spanish carpet, is a species of moth in the family Geometridae. It is found in Spain, Portugal, France, Switzerland and Great Britain, where it is found on the Channel Islands and on occasion along the southern coast of mainland Britain.

The wingspan is 28–33 mm. Adults are on wing from August to September.

The larvae feed on Cytisus, Genista and Ulex species. They are greyish.
