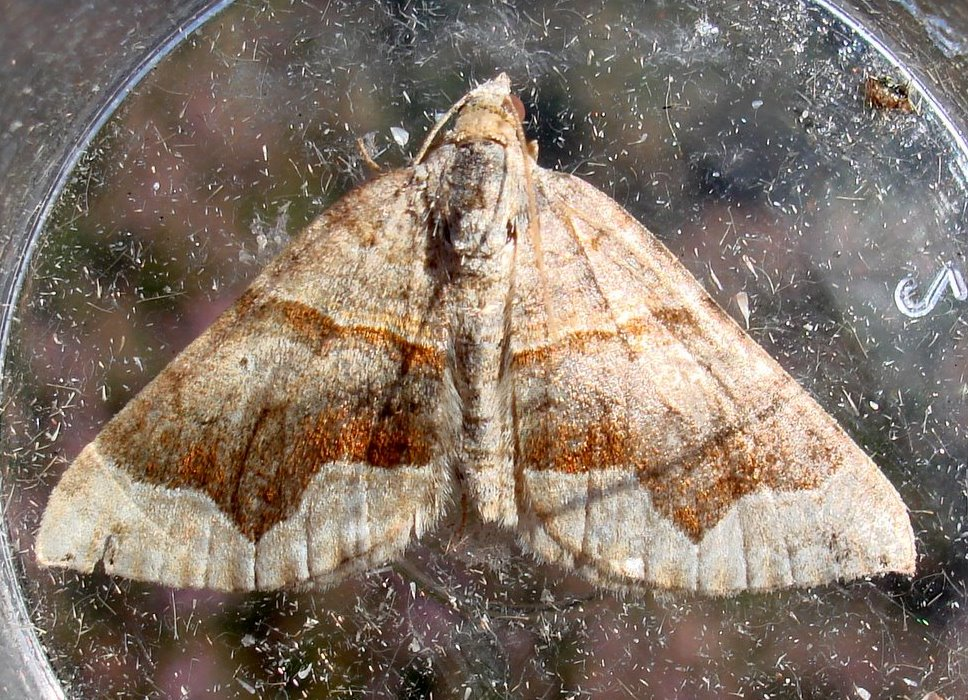

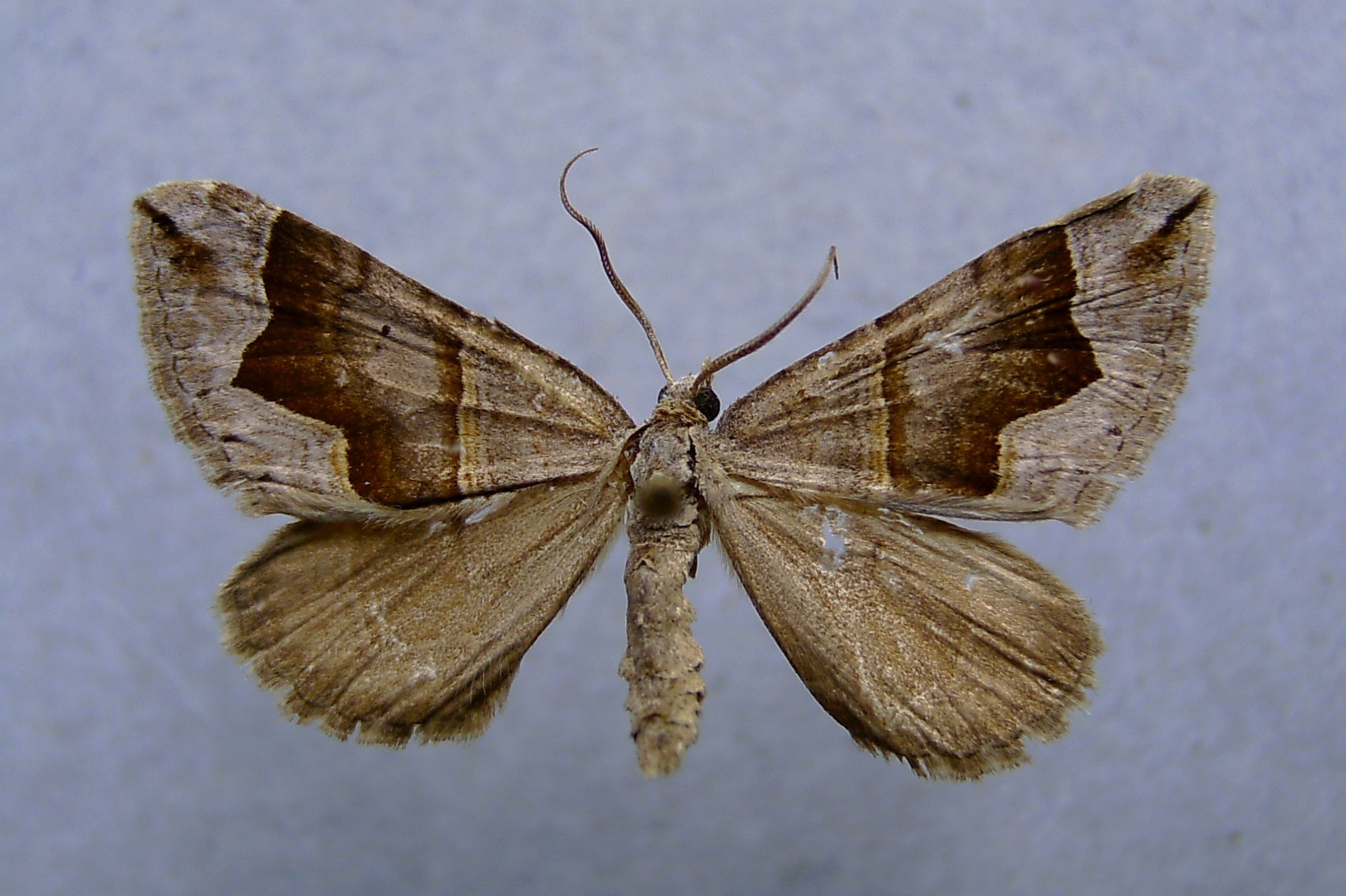

Scientific classification
- Domain: Eukaryota
- Kingdom: Animalia
- Phylum: Arthropoda
- Class: Insecta
- Order: Lepidoptera
- Family: Geometridae
- Genus: Scotopteryx
- Species: S. moeniata

Binomial name
- Scotopteryx moeniata (Scopoli, 1763)

Synonyms
- Phalaena moeniata Scopoli, 1763

= Scotopteryx moeniata =

Fortified carpet

Species of moth

Scotopteryx moeniata, the fortified carpet, is a moth of the family Geometridae. The species was first described by Giovanni Antonio Scopoli in his 1763 Entomologia Carniolica. It is found in most of Europe except the north. It is also found in the Near East.

It is no longer present in the Netherlands and is a rare species in Belgium. In Belgium it was only recorded from the south, but recently a population was discovered in Flanders. It is not thought to be present in Great Britain, although there are a couple of unconfirmed records from northern England in the late 19th century, and one in Jersey in 1973.

The wingspan is 28–32 mm. Adults are on wing from mid-July to the beginning of September. There is one generation per year.

The larvae feed on various Cytisus species.
