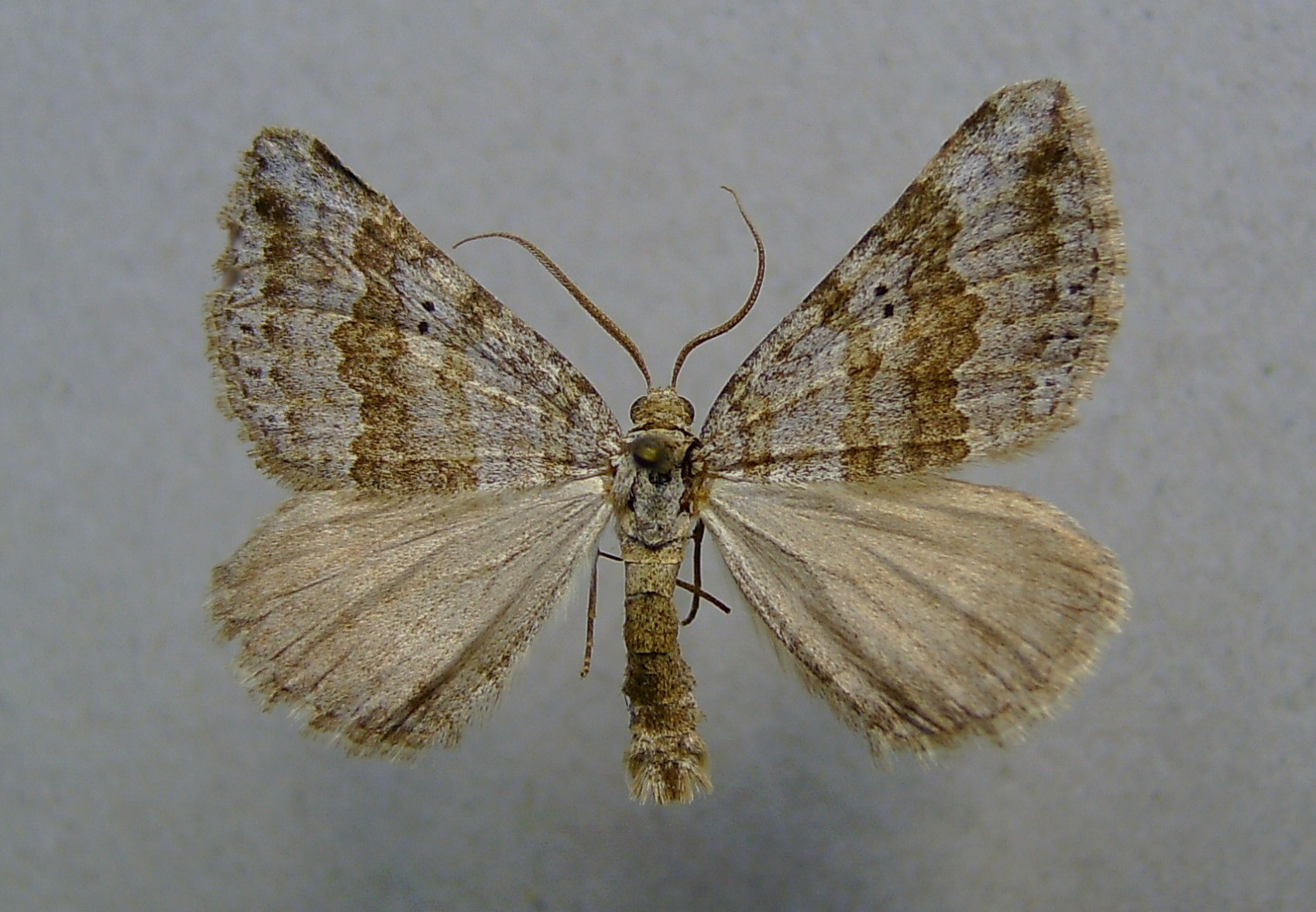

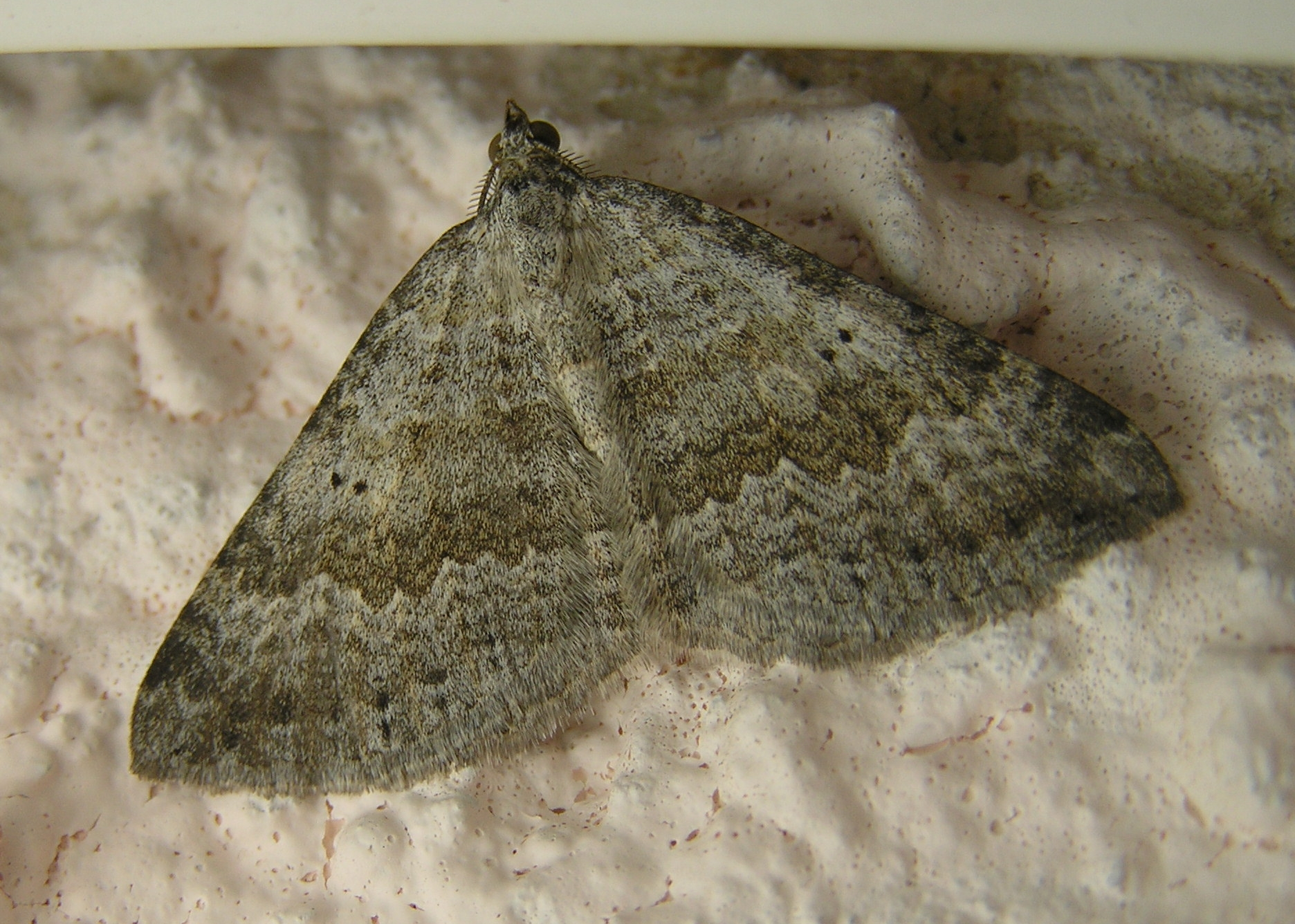

Scientific classification
- Domain: Eukaryota
- Kingdom: Animalia
- Phylum: Arthropoda
- Class: Insecta
- Order: Lepidoptera
- Family: Geometridae
- Genus: Scotopteryx
- Species: S. bipunctaria

Binomial name
- Scotopteryx bipunctaria (Denis & Schiffermüller, 1775)

Synonyms
- Geometra bipunctaria Denis & Schiffermuller, 1775; Phalaena undularia Scopoli, 1763; Ortholitha cretata Prout, 1937; Ortholitha maritima Seebold, 1879

= Scotopteryx bipunctaria =

Chalk carpet

Species of moth

Scotopteryx bipunctaria, also known as the chalk carpet, is a moth in the family Geometridae. The species was first described by Michael Denis and Ignaz Schiffermüller in 1775. It is found from Morocco and Spain through western and central Europe and Great Britain to the Ural. In the north it is found up to the Baltic region and in the south its range extends over Italy and the Balkan Peninsula up to the Black Sea and Caspian Sea.

The wingspan is 26–32 mm. Adults are on wing from June to August in one generation per year.

The larvae feed on various low-growing plants, including Vicia, Lotus, Hippocrepis and Teucrium species. Larvae can be found from September onwards. They overwinter and pupate in May or June of the following year.

== Subspecies ==
- Scotopteryx bipunctaria bipunctaria
- Scotopteryx bipunctaria cretata (Prout, 1937)
- Scotopteryx bipunctaria maritima (Seebold, 1879)
