= St. Eusebia =

St. Eusebia may refer to:

- Saint Xenia the Righteous of Rome, a 5th-century saint with the baptismal name Eusebia
- Saint Eusebia of Hamage, a 7th-century abbess of the Abbey of Hamay-sur-la-Scarpe, in the diocese of Arras in (Frankish) Hainaut, Francia
- Eusebia Palomino Yenes (1899—1935), Spanish nun of the Salesian Sisters of Don Bosco, beatified by the Catholic church in 2004

== See also ==
- Eusebia (disambiguation)
- Chronological list of saints in the 7th century
- Chronological list of saints and blesseds in the 20th century
