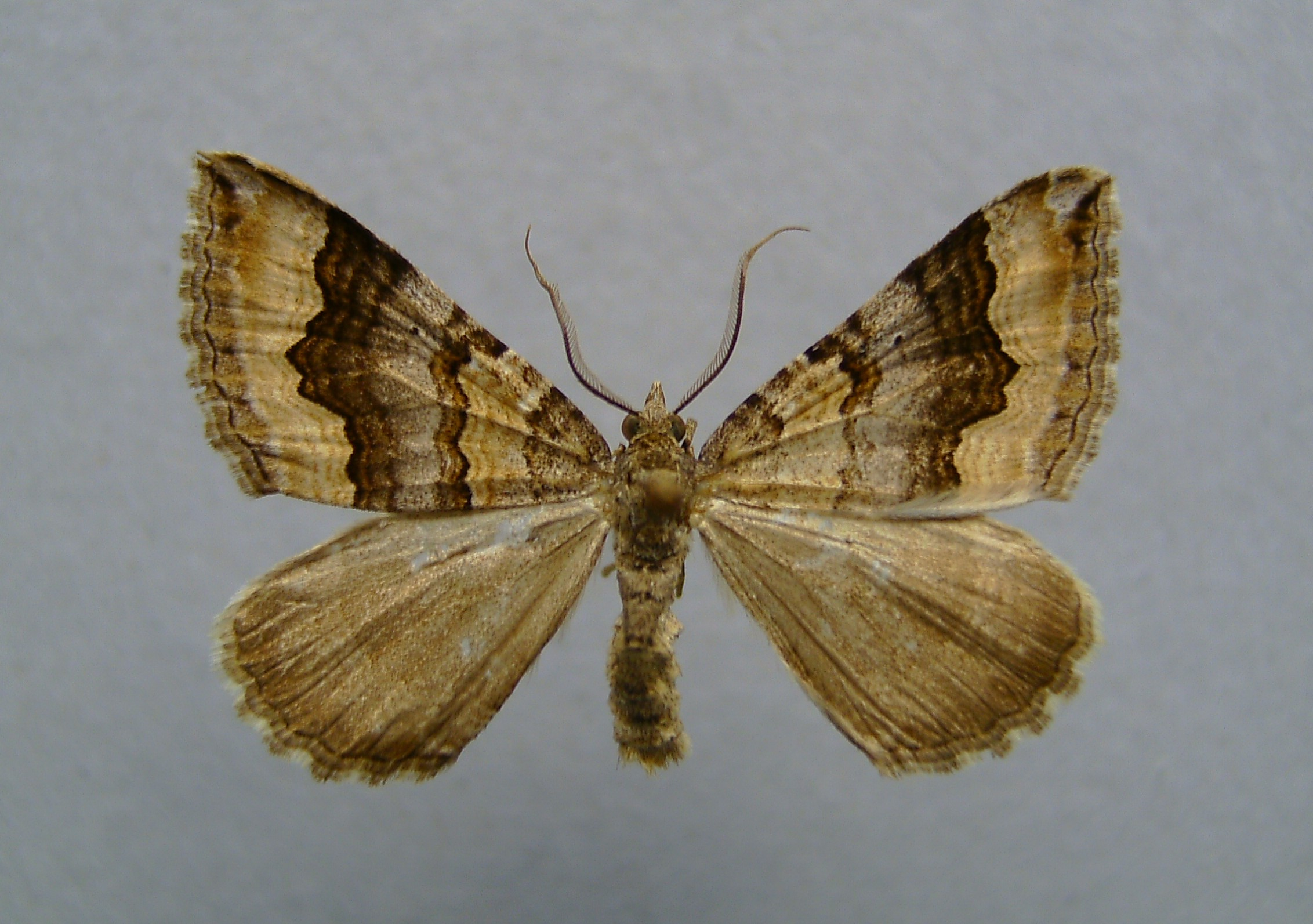
- Male

Scientific classification
- Domain: Eukaryota
- Kingdom: Animalia
- Phylum: Arthropoda
- Class: Insecta
- Order: Lepidoptera
- Family: Geometridae
- Genus: Scotopteryx
- Species: S. coelinaria

Binomial name
- Scotopteryx coelinaria (Graslin, 1863)

Synonyms
- Eubolia coelinaria de Graslin, 1863; Eubolia jugicola Staudinger, 1870; Eubolia vernetaria Oberthur, 1896; Eubolia gerardini Oberthur, 1907

= Scotopteryx coelinaria =

Species of moth

Scotopteryx coelinaria is a species of moth in the family Geometridae. It is found in Portugal, Spain, Andorra and the French Pyrenees.

The wingspan is 28–34 mm. The ground colour is brownish. Adults are on wing from June to July in one generation per year.

The larvae have been recorded feeding on Genista species.
