= Eusebia =

Eusebia may refer to:

- Eusebia (empress) (died 360), second wife of the Roman emperor Constantius II
- Ereleuva or Eusebia (died c. 500), the mother of Theoderic the Great
- St. Eusebia (disambiguation), any of several Christian saints
- Kayseri or Eusebia, a Turkish city
- Tyana or Eusebia, a city of ancient Cappadocia
- Scotopteryx (syn. Eusebia), a genus of moth
- Oma Eusebia, a wolf character in the German comic Fix and Foxi
- Eusebia Cosme (1908–1976), Afro-Cuban poetry reciter and actress
- Eusebia Simpson Hunkins (1902–1980), American composer

== See also ==
- Eusebeia (Greek: εὐσέβεια), a Greek philosophical and Biblical concept meaning inner piety, spiritual maturity, or godliness.
- Eusebius (disambiguation) (masculine name)
- Eusebio (disambiguation)
