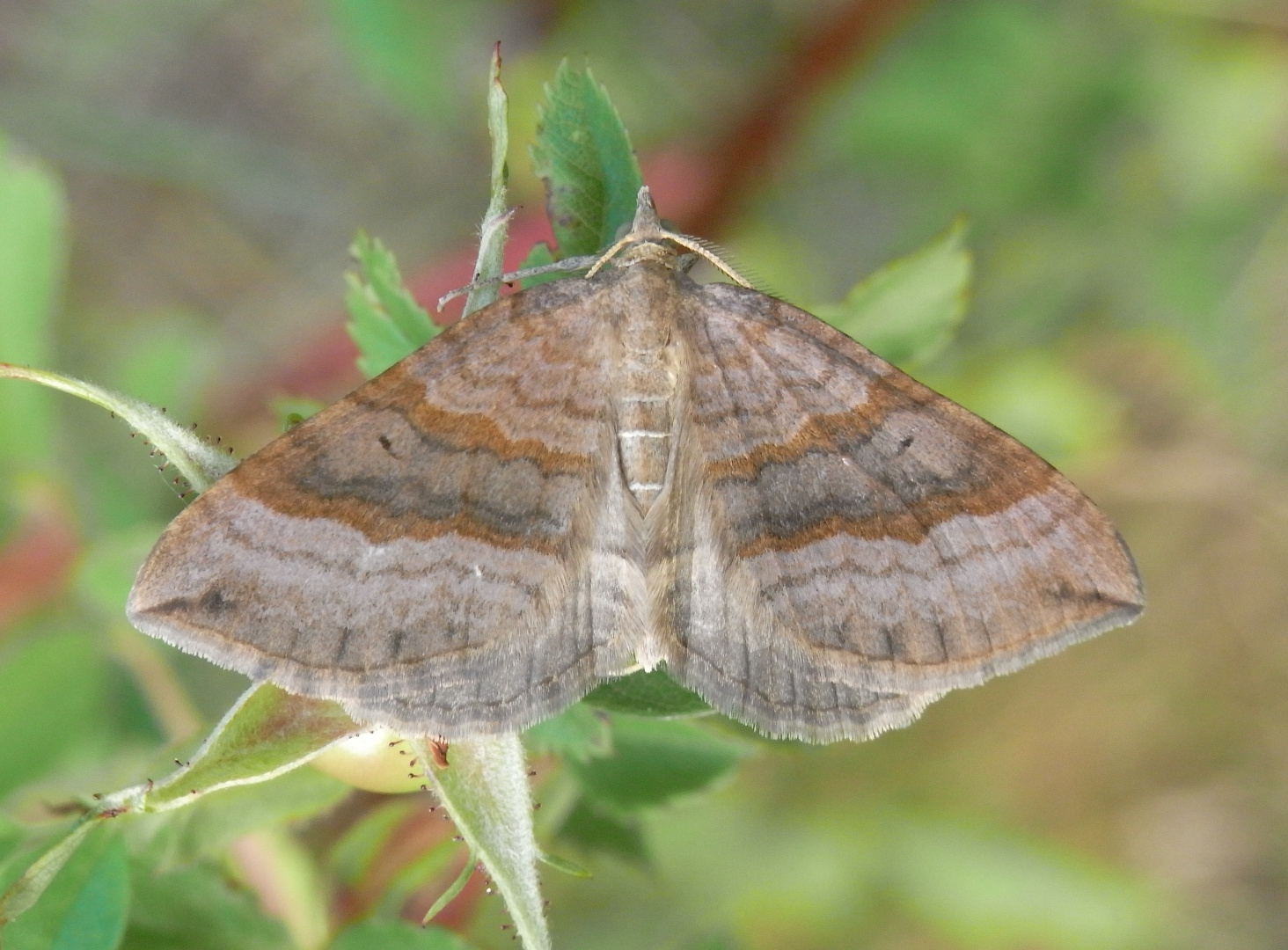
- Upperside
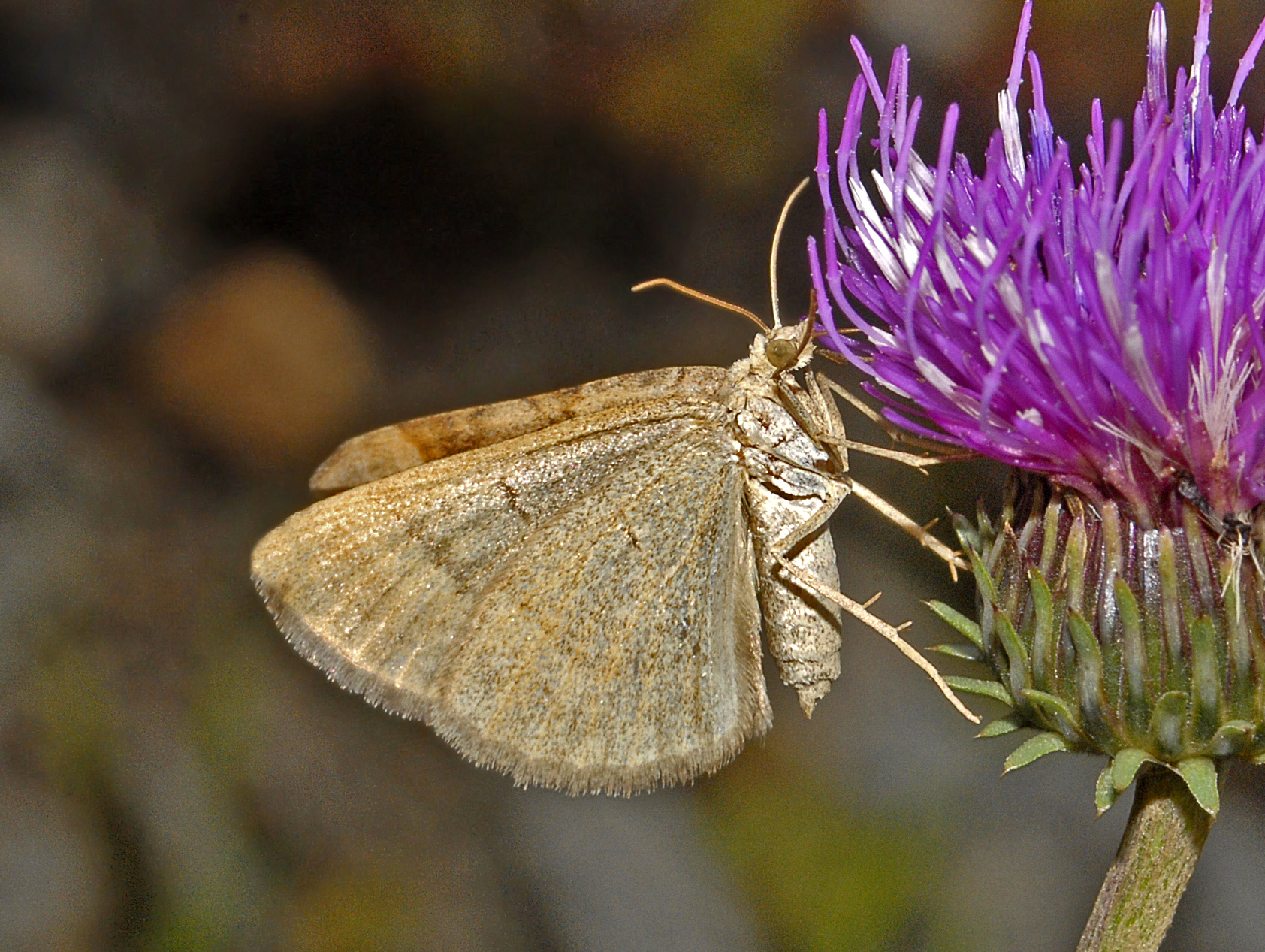
- Underside

Scientific classification
- Kingdom: Animalia
- Phylum: Arthropoda
- Class: Insecta
- Order: Lepidoptera
- Family: Geometridae
- Genus: Scotopteryx
- Species: S. chenopodiata

Binomial name
- Scotopteryx chenopodiata (Linnaeus, 1758)

Synonyms
- Ortholitha chenopodiata (Linnaeus, 1758); Scotopteryx limitata Scopoli, 1763

= Scotopteryx chenopodiata =

Shaded broad-bar

Species of moth

Scotopteryx chenopodiata, the shaded broad-bar, is a moth of the family Geometridae. It was first described by Carl Linnaeus in his 1758 10th edition of Systema Naturae.

== Description ==
The wingspan is 25–30 mm. The length of the forewings is 16–19 mm. The colouration is highly variable. It ranges from yellow brown, light brown, red brown and grey brown to grey. The forewings have several, mostly parallel, undulate crosslines. There is a prominent broad dark brown band in the median field comprising two distinct shades, the middle being greyer, the edges more ferruginous. In addition, the females are usually brighter yellowish than the males, but both sexes vary in tint. There is also a small apical streak. The hindwings are pale with faint crosslines. The caterpillar is yellowish grey to slate grey. The dorsal line is dark and interrupted, the side stripes are light and continuous. The reddish-brown-glossy pupa has a dotted surface. The cremaster is wide, with two long hook-shaped thorns and two fine lateral bristles rolled up at the top

== Variations ==
- ab. monodii Th.-Mieg is a dark form with both wings smoky above and beneath, median band very dark. Perhaps forms a local race in the north of England.
- ab. grisescens Hormuz., from the alpine and subalpine regions of Bukovina, is probably similar to monodii but is much smaller than the type, grey brown, the postmedian line straighter than normal.
- ab. unicolor Th.-Mieg has the forewing almost uniformly coffee brown, with the median band not darker. Rather frequent in the south of France.
- ab. defasciata Rbl, founded on a unique aberration in the Capper collection has the antemedian line placed nearer the base than usual and the postmedian of both wings removed to less than 2 mm. from the distal margin. The median area of the forewing is thus extraordinarily broad and moreover it is of a uniform ground colour, not darkened. Ribbe has recorded under this name two examples from Andalusia with no darkened central area, but these should probably be referred to unicolor.
- ab. violacearia Lambill is described as having the ground colour of the forewing pale yellow and the median band violaceous yellow and is said to be very rare in Belgium.
- ab. medioprieta Ribbe is described as having the basal area of the forewing above darkened as well as the median. If this refers to the entire area proximally to the median band, it must be a striking form. Founded on a single specimen taken in the Sierra de Alfacar.
- ab sibirica B.-Haas is a local race from the Kentei Mountains, differing markedly in its lighter, more yellow brown.

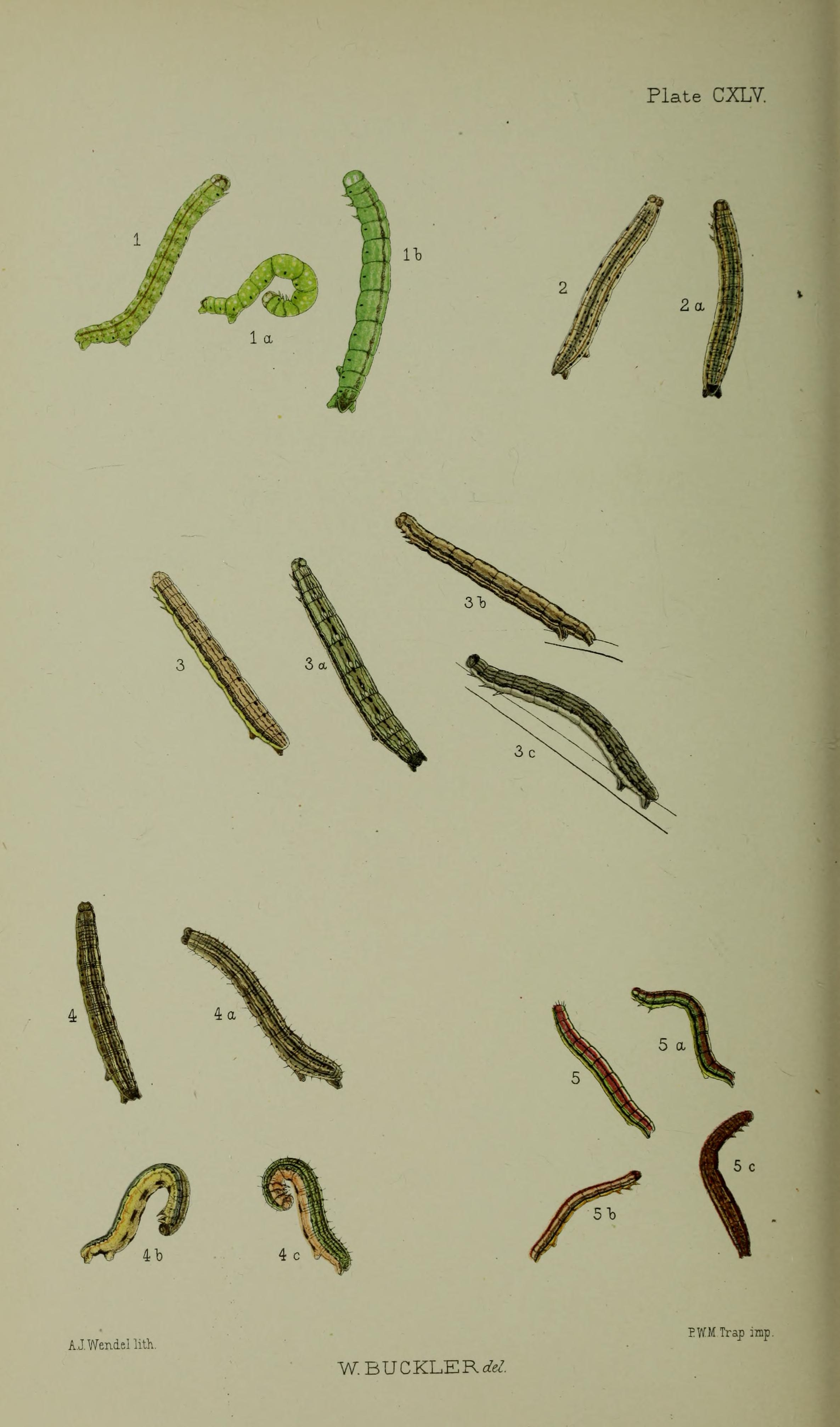
Figs.2, 2a larvae after final moult

== Biology ==
The moth flies in one generation from June to August. The larva feeds on Centaurea scabiosa, Centaurea jacea, Knautia arvensis, Knautia dipsacifolia, Scabiosa columbaria, Cirsium arvense, Cirsium oleraceum, Origanum vulgare, Thymus pulegioides, Sanguisorba officinalis, Eupatorium cannabinum, Clinopodium vulgare, Solidago gigantea and Vicia cracca.

== Distribution ==
This species can be found throughout much of the Palearctic from Europe it extends across Central Asia to Siberia, the Russian Far East (Sakhalin), Amur, Altai Mountains, and Ussuri.

In Europe it extends from the Iberian Peninsula, in the north, to northern Fennoscandia in the south to the Italian Peninsula and the Balkan Peninsula.

== Notes ==
1. The flight season refers to Belgium and the Netherlands. This may vary in other parts of the range.
