= Marion Clyde McCarroll =

Marion Clyde McCarroll (1891-1977) was a writer and journalist. McCarroll was the first woman issued a press pass by the New York Stock Exchange in New York City. She attained the press pass during the 1920s while writing for The Commercial, a daily business newspaper. McCarroll also penned the "Advice for the Lovelorn, a nationally syndicated column, after she inherited it from Dorothy Dix.

== Early life and education ==
McCarroll was born in East Orange, New Jersey, on May 8, 1891, to James Renwick Thompson and Helena Fredericka Stoughton (Loomis) McCarroll. She graduated from the Beard School (now Morristown-Beard School) in Orange, New Jersey, in 1910. McCarroll then completed her bachelor's degree at Wellesley College in Wellesley, Massachusetts, in 1914. After graduating from college, McCarroll worked as a social worker for a year.

== Journalism and writing career ==
McCarroll began her journalism career as a reporter for The Ridgefield Weekly of Ridgefield, New Jersey. She then joined The Commercial as a columnist for its "Women in Business" column. McCarroll served as the woman's page editor for King Features Syndicate, which distributed her column. She also served as the women's editor at the New York Evening Post (now The New York Post).

During the 1930s, McCarroll wrote for both The New York Evening Post and the Sunday edition of The New York World. Her stories during this period included a feature article about a flight she took with pioneering aviator Ruth Rowland Nichols. McCarroll also worked as a publicity writer for Rockefeller Center. She served as president of the New York Newspaper Women's Club from 1930 to 1931 and from 1949 to 1950. During her tenure of service at the club, Franklin Roosevelt (then the Governor of New York) visited.

McCarroll earned notoriety for penning the "Advice to the Lovelorn", a syndicated column. After initial reluctance, she started writing the column for the Hearst newspaper chain at the request of Ward Greene. McCarroll continued writing the column under the pen name of Beatrice Fairfax for the next 21 years. (between 1942 and 1963). In 1952, the New York chapter of Theta Sigma Pi, a journalism honor society, awarded her their Women of Achievement Award.

== Marriage ==
McCarroll married journalist Lynn Booth in 1926. They divorced in 1935.

== Death ==
Previously a resident of Manhattan and Ridgewood, New Jersey, McCarroll died on August 1, 1977, at a nursing home in Allendale, New Jersey, where she had resided for the last seven years of her life.

== Works ==
- Summer Cookbook (1954)
- Suzanne of Belgium; the story of a modern girl, with Suzanne Silvercruys Farnam (1932)
