= Suzanne Silvercruys =

Belgian-American sculptor

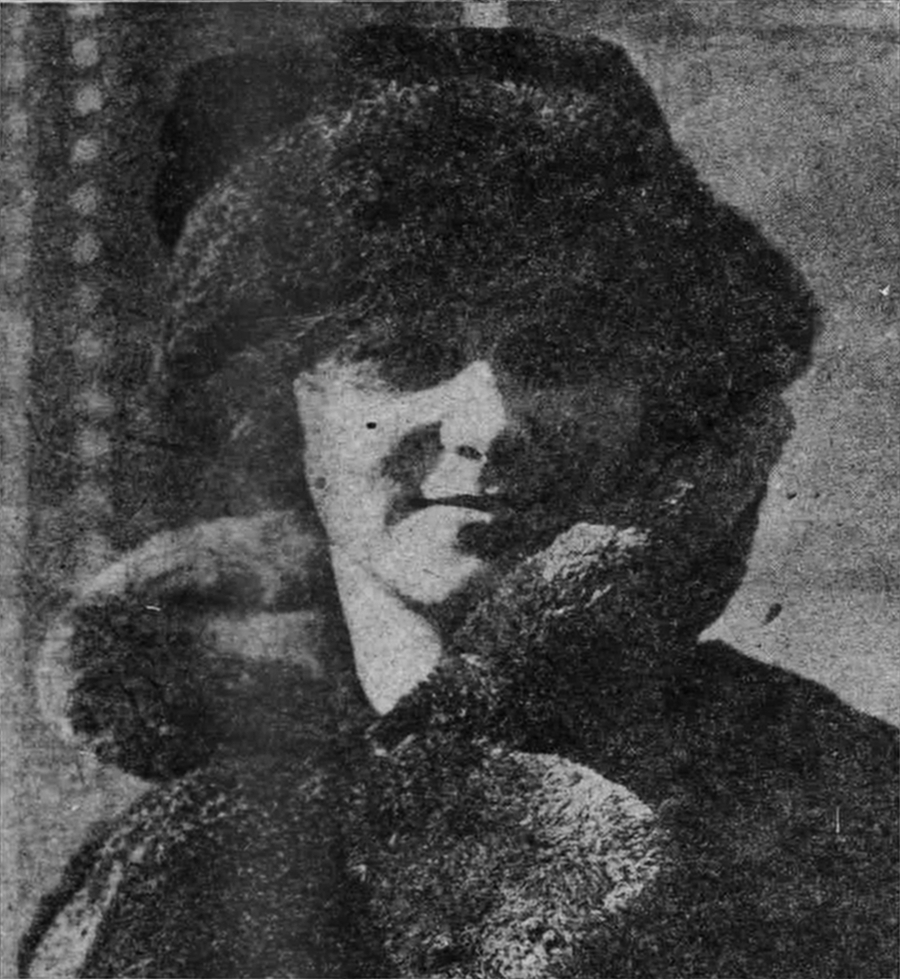
Suzanne Silvercruys in 1918, from The Oregonian

Baroness Suzanne Silvercruys (married names Suzanne Farnam, Suzanne Stevenson; May 29, 1898 – March 31, 1973) was a Belgian-American sculptor and political activist, founder and first president of the Minute Women of the U.S.A.

== Life and career ==
Suzanne Silvercruys was born in Maaseik, Belgium, where her father, Baron Frantz (François) Silvercruys, was a Conseiller (justice) and later president of the Court of Cassation. The family came to the United States in 1915 in flight from World War I; she became a U.S. citizen in 1922. Her brother, Baron Robert Silvercruys, was a poet and professor of French and later the Belgian ambassador to Canada and then for many years to the United States.

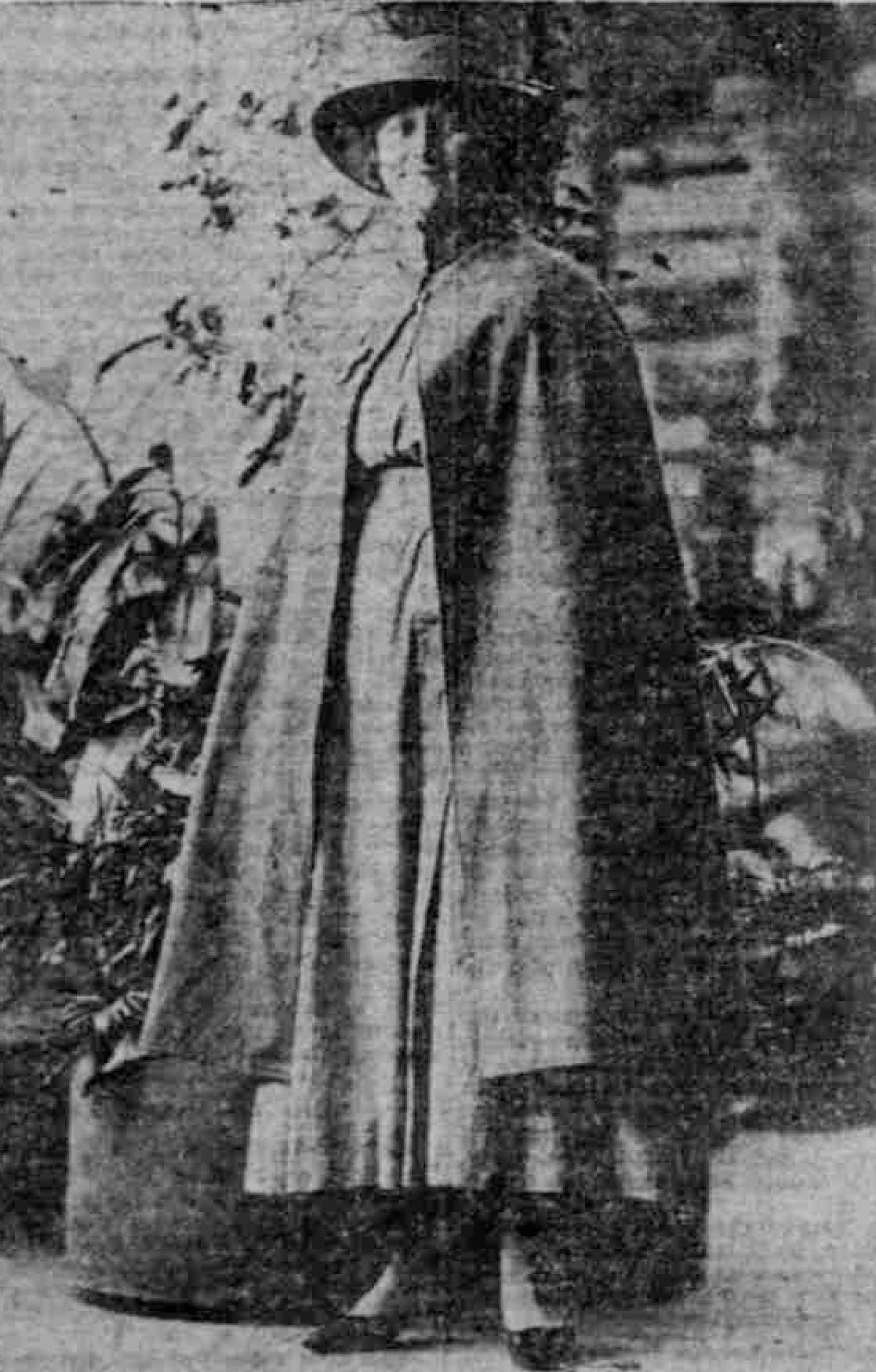
Suzanne Silvercruys in 1918, from The Oregonian

In 1917, she was one of 1,500 people present at a dinner in Philadelphia where Secretary of War Newton D. Baker was to speak; when he failed to appear, she was invited to speak instead and described the Rape of Belgium by the invading Germans. She subsequently toured the US and Canada as "the little Belgian girl", publicizing the Belgians' plight and raising a million dollars for relief to them. She received honors from the King and Queen of Belgium, including the Order of Leopold and the Order of the Crown; she was also awarded the British Coronation Medal and was an officer of the French Academy.

Silvercruys originally hoped for a career as a musician; she became interested in sculpture when she was ill with tuberculosis and a friend gave her some modeling clay; she sculpted her dog's head. She graduated from the Yale School of Fine Arts in 1928 and worked as a sculptor, mainly producing portraits of famous people; she also painted portraits. She had a one-person sculpture show in New York in 1930. She also lectured on sculpture, often sculpting one or more members of the audience, and taught the first college class in sculpture at Wichita Falls, Texas. In the 1932 Summer Olympics in Los Angeles, she represented Belgium as a sculptor in the art competition.

She was awarded an honorary Doctorate of Humane Letters by Temple University and, in 1966, an LL.D. by Mount Allison University, where her papers are preserved. She lived for many years in Norwalk, Connecticut, and in Tucson, Arizona, where she was living when she died in Washington, D. C., while on a lecture tour.

=== Political career ===
In World War II Silvercruys was again active on behalf of Belgian relief. After the war she became a prominent anti-Socialist speaker and activist. She was one of the organizers of the Young Republican League of Connecticut and was the founder and president of Minute Women of the U.S.A.; (Note: There are varying accounts of whether she was the sole founder of the Minute Women. George Norris Green, The Establishment in Texas Politics: The Primitive Years, 1938–1957, Contributions in Political Science 21, Westport, Connecticut / London: Greenwood, 1979, ISBN 9780313205255, p. 123, also presents her as sole founder; however, according to Allan J. Lichtman, White Protestant Nation: The Rise of the American Conservative Movement, New York: Atlantic Monthly Press, 2008, ISBN 9780871139849, p. 152, she co-founded the organization with Vivian Kellems.) she left that position in 1952 to co-found the Constitution Party, but soon in turn left the party, disenchanted with her treatment as a foreign-born Catholic and believing it harbored anti-Semites. Her political feminism prefigured that of Phyllis Schlafly: she sought to mobilize conservative women in defence of traditional American values, was much influenced by John T. Flynn, and treasured a letter from Senator Joseph McCarthy, which was shown to hesitant Minute Women recruits.

She assisted in placing a candidate on the Connecticut delegation to the Republican National Convention in 1950, and twice sought a place in Congress herself: as a candidate for the Republican nomination in the 1946 election for the House of Representatives and as an independent right-wing Republican candidate against incumbent Republican Prescott Bush in the 1956 election for the Senate.

=== Private life ===
Silvercruys was married twice, to Henry W. Farnam, Jr., son of a Yale professor, and to Edward Ford Stevenson, who had filmed the Tehran and Yalta conferences during World War II and was later a colonel in the U.S. Army Reserve, advertising executive, and producer; he died before her.

== Selected works ==
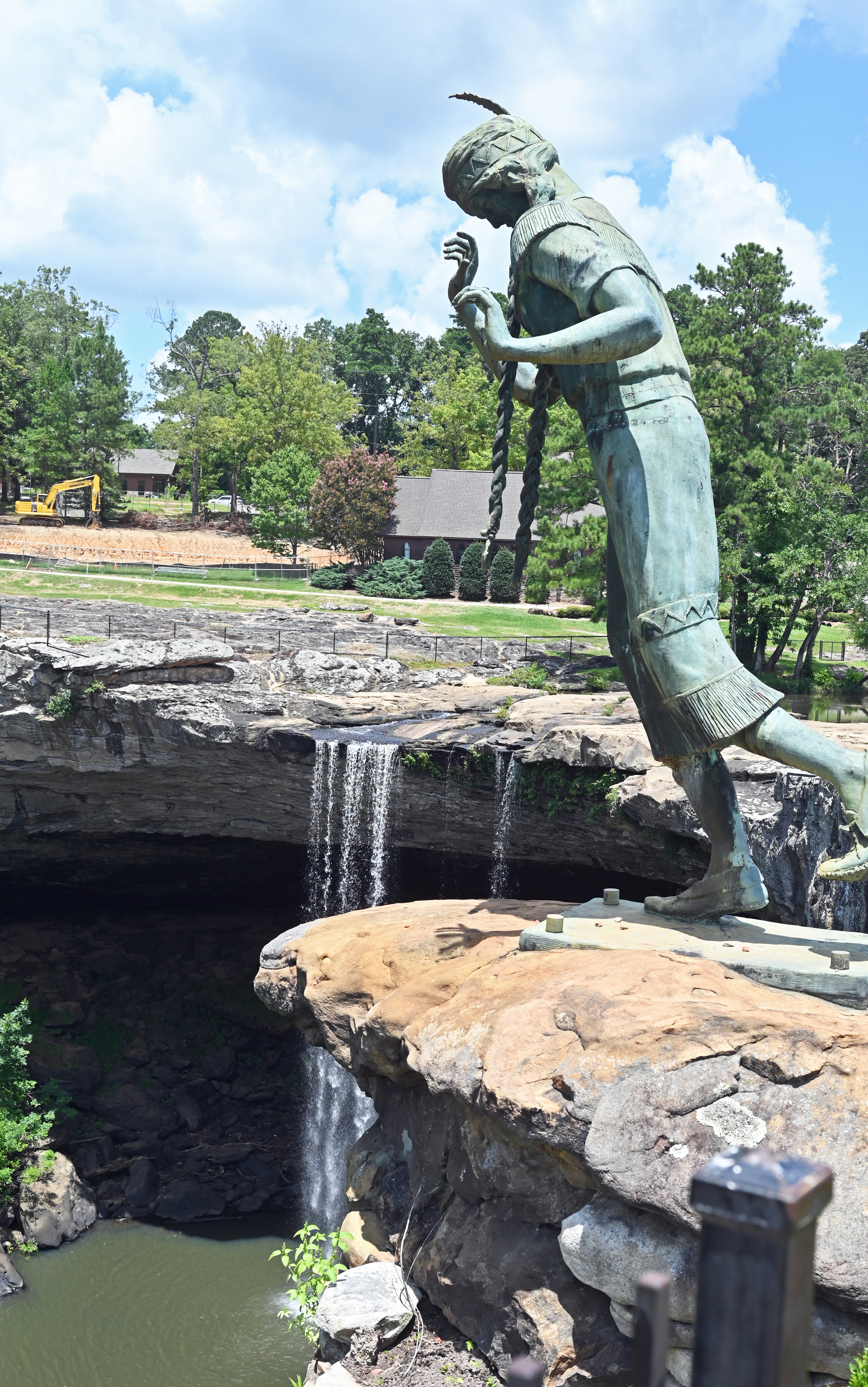
Princess Noccalula

- Bust of Lord Tweedsmuir, in the collection of the Metropolitan Museum of New York
- Bust of Herbert Hoover for the library at the University of Louvain, now in the Katholieke Universiteit Leuven
- Bust of Anthony McAuliffe, Place McAuliffe, Bastogne (1946–1947)
- Memorial group portrait of Queen Astrid of Belgium and children
- Group portrait of the Dionne quintuplets at the age of five
- Statue of Francisco Eusebio Kino, one of the two statues from Arizona in the National Statuary Hall Collection in Washington, D. C.
- Trophy presented to Amelia Earhart by the Zonta Club of New York after her first solo trans-Atlantic flight
- Twice life-size bust of Robert A. Taft
- Statue of Princess Noccalula (1969), at Noccalula Falls Park, Gadsden, Alabama

== Publications ==
- Suzanne of Belgium: The Story of a Modern Girl (autobiography, with Marion Clyde McCarroll). New York: Dutton, [1932]. OCLC 5224112.
- The Epic of America (pageant)
- There Is No Death (drama, 1935)
- A Primer of Sculpture. New York: Putnam, [1942]. OCLC 1509301.
