= Eusebius of Alexandria =

Byzantine writer

Eusebius of Alexandria (Greek: Εὐσέβιος) is the name of a fictional 6th-century Christian author. A collection of 22 extant Greek homilies exists with his name on it. The collection also contains a hagiographical life of Eusebius by a certain John the Notary, who appears to be the real author of the homilies.

== Biography ==
There has been much dispute regarding the details of his life and the age in which he lived. Galland (Vet. Patr. Biblioth., VIII, 23) says: "de Eusebio qui vulgo dicitur episcopus Alexandræ incerta omnia" (Concerning Eusebius, commonly called bishop of Alexandria there is nothing sure). His writings have been attributed to Eusebius of Emesa, Eusebius of Cæsarea, and others.

According to an old biography said to have been written by his notary, the monk John, and discovered by Cardinal Mai, he lived in the fifth century and led a monastic life near Alexandria. The fame of his virtues attracted the attention of Cyril, Bishop of Alexandria, who visited him with his clergy, and in 444, when dying, had him elected his successor, and consecrated him bishop, though much against his will. Eusebius displayed great zeal in the exercise of his office and did much good by his preaching. Among those he converted was a certain Alexander, a man of senatorial rank. After having ruled his see for seven or, according to another account, for twenty years, he made Alexander his successor and retired to the desert, whence Cyril had summoned him and there died in the odor of sanctity.

But unfortunately these claims are contradicted by all the other historical sources. Neither the name of Eusebius or his successor Alexander, appears in the list of the occupants of that ancient see. Dioscurus is known as the immediate successor of Cyril. Nor does the style of the homilies seem on the whole in keeping with the age of Cyril. It may be noted also that the biographer of Eusebius expressly states that the Cyril in question is the great opponent of Nestorius.

Various solution of the difficulty have been proposed during the 19th century. Thilo suggested that the authorship of the homilies should be assigned either to a certain monk – one of four brothers of the fifth century, or to a presbyter and court chaplain of Justinian I, who took an active part in the theological strifes of the sixth century. Mai suggested that after the death of Cyril, there were two bishops at Alexandria, Dioscurus, the Monophysite leader, and Eusebius, the head of the Catholic party. In 1969 Leroy and Glorie noted that the style of the homilies is identical to that of the biography by John the Notary, and conclude that John wrote the homilies and Eusebius of Alexandria is a fictional personage.

== Works ==
The homilies cover a variety of subjects, and the author is one of the earliest patristic witnesses to the doctrine regarding the descent of Christ into Hell.

A list of homilies with the complete text was printed by Mai, and reprinted in Migne. The "Sermo de Confusione Diaboli" was published with an introduction by Rand in "Modern Philology", II, 261.

These homilies attributed to Eusebius of Alexandria enjoyed some renown in the Eastern Church in the sixth and seventh centuries.

The discourses belong probably to the fifth or sixth century, and possibly originated in Alexandria. They deal with the life of Jesus of Nazareth and with questions of ecclesiastical life and practice. Their literary character is not quite clear; while most of them are adapted for public delivery, many are written in the style of ecclesiastical pronouncements.

The homilies were translated into Latin soon after they were written. While this translation does not survive, many of the homilies in the popular 7th century Latin collection of homilies known as Eusebius Gallicanus make identical points in similar language.
