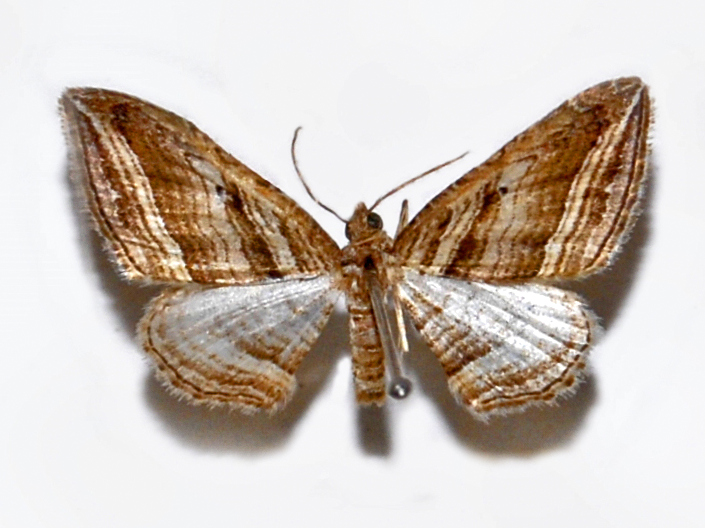
- Mounted specimen on display at the Museo Civico di Storia Naturale di Trieste

Scientific classification
- Kingdom: Animalia
- Phylum: Arthropoda
- Clade: Pancrustacea
- Class: Insecta
- Order: Lepidoptera
- Family: Geometridae
- Genus: Scotopteryx
- Species: S. vittistrigata

Binomial name
- Scotopteryx vittistrigata (Prout, 1910)

Synonyms
- Orthonama vittistrigata Prout, 1910; Phybalopteryx vittistrigata

= Scotopteryx vittistrigata =

Species of moth

Scotopteryx vittistrigata is a species of moth of the family Geometridae.

== Description ==
Scotopteryx vittistrigata has a wingspan of about 32 millimetres (1.3 in). Head, thorax, and abdomen are pale ochreous varied with brown. Forewings are pale ochreous, crossed by numerous oblique brown lines. Hindwing with the lines most distinct on the inner margin, except the outer line and terminal area, which are distinct throughout.

== Distribution ==
This species can be found in Brazil.
