= Statue of Eusebio Kino =

Sculpture in Washington, DC

Eusebio Kino
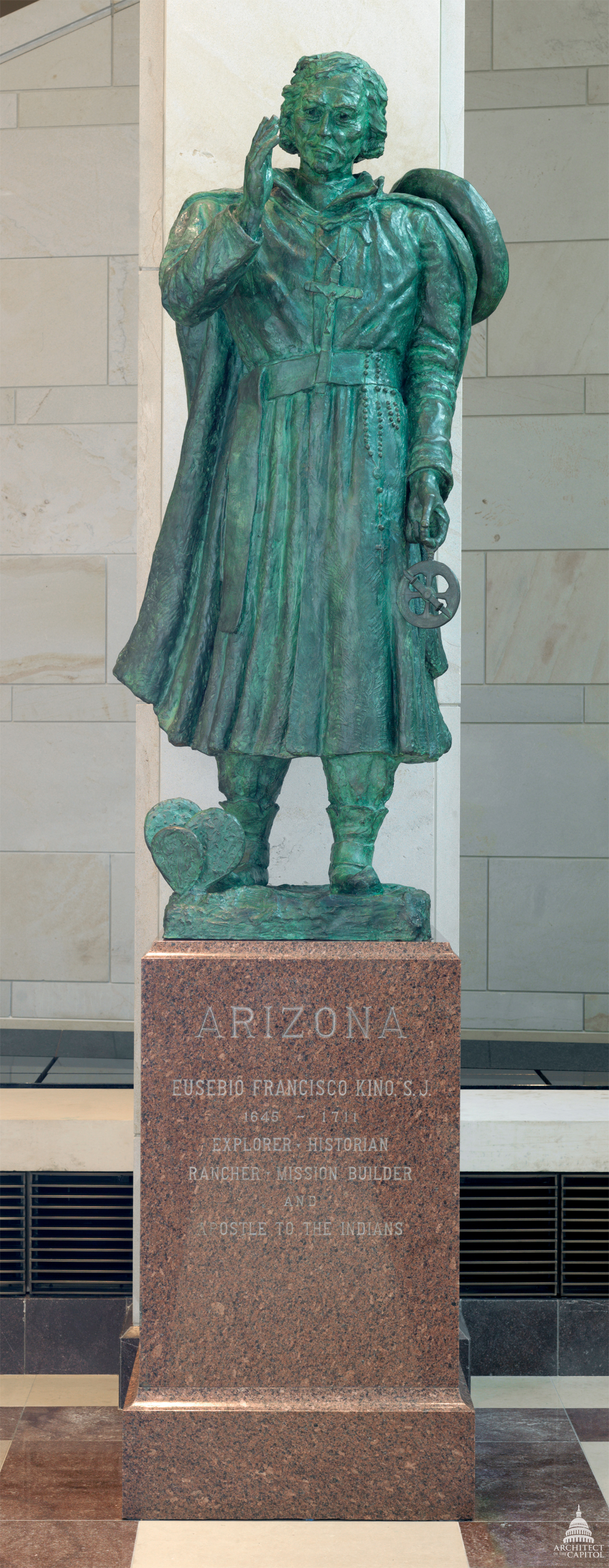
- The statue in the National Statuary Hall Collection
- Artist: Suzanne Silvercruys
- Medium: Bronze sculpture
- Subject: Eusebio Kino
- Location: Washington, D.C., United States

Eusebio Kino is a bronze sculpture depicting the Italian Jesuit, missionary, geographer, explorer, cartographer and astronomer of the same name by Suzanne Silvercruys, installed in the United States Capitol Visitor Center's Emancipation Hall, in Washington, D.C., as part of the National Statuary Hall Collection. The statue was gifted by the U.S. state of Arizona in 1965.

== See also ==
- 1965 in art
