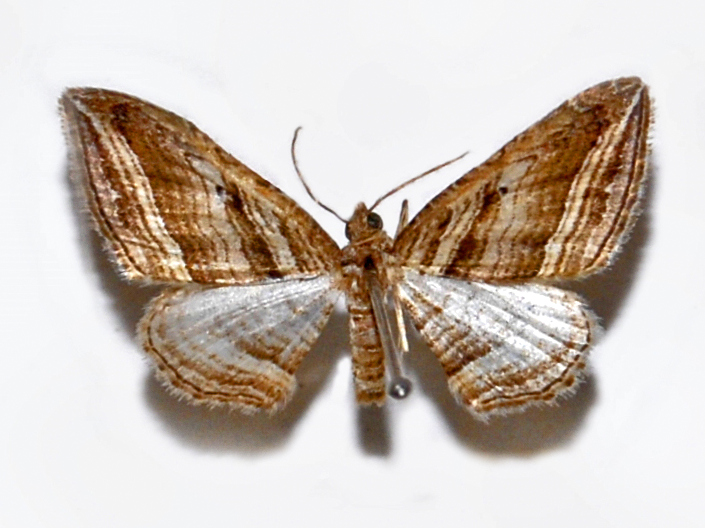
- Scotopteryx vittistrigata.

Scientific classification
- Kingdom: Animalia
- Phylum: Arthropoda
- Clade: Pancrustacea
- Class: Insecta
- Order: Lepidoptera
- Family: Geometridae
- Tribe: Xanthorhoini
- Genus: Scotopteryx; Hübner, 1825

Species
- See text

Synonyms
- Eusebia Duponchel, 1845; Limonophila Gumppenberg, 1887; Onychia Hübner, 1825; Phasiane Duponchel, 1829

= Scotopteryx =

Genus of moths

Scotopteryx is a genus of moths of the family Geometridae described by Jacob Hübner in 1825. It is suspected that some species currently placed here actually belong in Entephria.

== Selected species ==
- Scotopteryx aelptes (Prout, 1937)
- Scotopteryx alfacaria (Staudinger, 1859)
- Scotopteryx alpherakii (Erschoff, 1877)
- Scotopteryx angularia (de Villers, 1789)
- Scotopteryx bipunctaria (Denis & Schiffermüller, 1775)
  - Scotopteryx bipunctaria bipunctaria (Denis & Schiffermüller, 1775)
  - Scotopteryx bipunctaria cretata (Prout, 1937)
  - Scotopteryx bipunctaria maritima (Seebold, 1879)
- Scotopteryx burgaria (Eversmann, 1843)
- Scotopteryx chenopodiata (Linnaeus, 1758) – shaded broad-bar
- Scotopteryx coarctaria (Denis & Schiffermüller, 1775)
- Scotopteryx coelinaria (de Graslin, 1863)
- Scotopteryx diniensis (Neuburger, 1906)
- Scotopteryx elbursica (Bytinski-Salz & Brandt, 1935)
- Scotopteryx golovushkini Kostyuk, 1991
- Scotopteryx ignorata Huemer & Hausmann, 1998
- Scotopteryx junctata (Staudinger, 1882)
- Scotopteryx kurmanjiana Rajaei & László, 2014
- Scotopteryx kuznetsovi (Wardikjan, 1957)
- Scotopteryx langi (Christoph, 1885)
- Scotopteryx luridata (Hufnagel, 1767)
  - Scotopteryx luridata luridata (Hufnagel, 1767)
  - Scotopteryx luridata plumbaria (Fabricius, 1775)
- Scotopteryx moeniata (Scopoli, 1763)
- Scotopteryx mucronata (Scopoli, 1763)
- Scotopteryx obvallaria (Mabille, 1867)
- Scotopteryx octodurensis (Favre, 1903)
  - Scotopteryx octodurensis lozerae (Herbulot, 1957)
  - Scotopteryx octodurensis nevadina (Wehrli, 1927)
  - Scotopteryx octodurensis octodurensis (Favre, 1903)
- Scotopteryx peribolata (Hübner, 1817)
- Scotopteryx perplexaria (Staudinger, 1892)
- Scotopteryx proximaria (Rambur, 1833)
- Scotopteryx roesleri (Vojnits, 1973)
- Scotopteryx sartata (Alphéraky, 1883)
- Scotopteryx sinensis (Alphéraky, 1883)
- Scotopteryx subvicinaria (Staudinger, 1892)
- Scotopteryx supproximata (Staudinger, 1892)
- Scotopteryx transbaicalica (Djakonov, 1955)
- Scotopteryx vicinaria (Duponchel, 1830)
  - Scotopteryx vicinaria illyriacaria (Schawerda, 1919)
  - Scotopteryx vicinaria vicinaria (Duponchel, 1830)
- Scotopteryx vittistrigata Prout, 1910
