= Eusebius the Hermit =

Saint Eusebius the Hermit was a fourth-century Syrian monk.

Eusebius undertook a rigorously ascetic lifestyle without shelter near a mountain village named Asicha.

According to Eastern Christian sources:

Though he was elderly and infirm, he ate only fifteen figs during the Great Forty day Fast. When many people began to flock to St. Eusebius, he went to a nearby monastery, built a small enclosure at the monastery walls and lived in it until his death.

Saint Eusebius the Hermit of Syria is commemorated 15 February by the Eastern Orthodox and Byzantine Catholic Churches.

== See also ==
- Stylites
- Desert Fathers
- Poustinia
