= Fernando Eusebio =

Italian footballer

Personal information
- Date of birth: 23 August 1910
- Place of birth: Rimini, Emilia-Romagna, Italy
- Position: Winger

Senior career*
Years	Team	Apps	(Gls)
1928–1935	Roma	54	(18)
1935–1936	Pistoiese	29	(8)
- * Club domestic league appearances and goals

Fernando Eusebio (born 23 August 1910) was an Italian professional football player.

Between 1928 and 1935, Eusebio was an ambidextrous winger for AS Roma. In six seasons, he scored 18 goals in 54 appearances, including three goals against SS Lazio. In 1935, he moved to Pistoiese, returning the following year to play for MATER.
