= Eusebius (sophist) =

Eusebius (Ancient Greek: Εὐσέβιος) was an Arab sophist and tutor of the 4th century AD known to have been active in Antioch during the reign of emperor Constantine I (306–337). According to the Suda, Eusebius was a rival of the sophist Ulpianus, presumably at the city of Antioch. Eusebius has sometimes been misidentified with another figure by the name of Eusebius Pittacas, bishop of Emesa.
