= José Eusebio de Llano Zapata =

Peruvian scholar, writer and scientist

José Eusebio de Llano Zapata (1721–1780) was a Peruvian scholar, writer and scientist. He was born in Lima, Peru in 1721 and died in Cadiz, Spain in 1780. He was the son of Diego de Llano Zapata and Rosa Valenzuela.

== Education and career ==
He was educated at the Franciscan College of Buenaventura de Guadalupe. He was a private student of Jesuit scholars like José Ignacio de Vargas, Alonso de la Cueva.

Between 1751 and 1755 Zapata traveled to Chile, Buenos Aires and Rio de Janeiro. In an effort to publish his historical, physical, apologetic memoirs of South America he traveled to Spain in 1755 to get authorization but his efforts were fruitless. While in Spain he published a preliminary edition of Memoirs. Zapata also compiled an epistolary with personalities of the time, publishing them in two volumes.

== Works ==
- Resolución en consulta sobre la irregularidad de las terminaciones "exiet" y "transiet" del capítulo 6 de Judith y 51 de Isaías, que según reglas de la latinidad pedían ser Exibit y Transibit (Resolution in consultation on the irregularity of the endings "exiet" and "transiet" in Chapter 6 of Judith and 51 of Isaiah, which, according to the Latin rules are to be "Exibit" and "Transibit"), Lima 1743.
- Respuestas a que satisface don José Eusebio Llano Zapata a los dos reparos que a unas cartas latinas que escribió, puso el Lic. Mariano de Alcocer (Responses that José Eusebio Llano Zapata meets the two objections put forward by Mariano de Alcocer to some Latin letters he wrote), Lima 1745.
- Translation of Hygiasticon o verdadero modo de conservar la salud ("Hygiasticon or true mode of preserving health") by the Jesuit, Leonardo Lessio.
- Observación Diaria Crítico-Histórico-Meteorológico, contiene todo lo acontecido en Lima, desde el 1 de marzo de 1747 hasta el 28 del mismo (Daily Critical-Historical-Meteorological Observation, contains everything that happened in Lima, from March 1, 1747, until the 28th).
- Respuesta dada al Rey nuestro señor D. Fernando el Sexto, sobre una pregunta que SM hizo a un Matemático y experimentado en las tierras de Lima, sobre el Terremoto acaecido en el día primero de noviembre de 1755 (Answer given to the King our lord D. Ferdinand the Sixth, on a question that SM posed to a mathematician and one experienced on the geography of Lima, about the earthquake which occurred on the first day of November 1755), Sevilla,1756.
