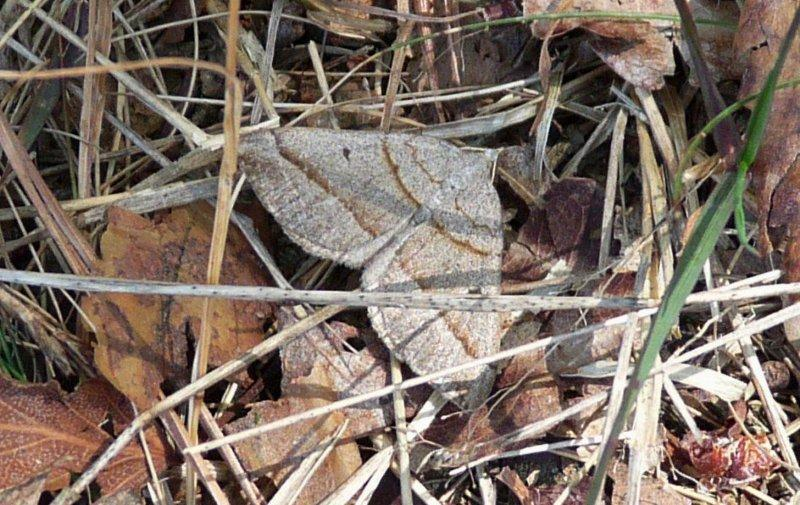

Scientific classification
- Domain: Eukaryota
- Kingdom: Animalia
- Phylum: Arthropoda
- Class: Insecta
- Order: Lepidoptera
- Family: Geometridae
- Genus: Scotopteryx
- Species: S. mucronata

Binomial name
- Scotopteryx mucronata (Scopoli, 1763)

Synonyms
- Phalaena mucronata Scopoli, 1763; Ortholitha scotica Cockayne, 1940

= Scotopteryx mucronata =

Lead belle

Species of moth

Scotopteryx mucronata, the lead belle, is a species of moth in the family Geometridae. It is found in most of Europe, Turkey, Ukraine, West Siberia.

The wingspan is 30–38 mm. See Townsend et al.

Adults are on wing from May to June in one generation per year.

The larvae feed on Ulex and Cytisus species. The species overwinters in the larval stage.
