= Eusebio Jiménez =

Cuban baseball player (born 1897)

- Third baseman / Second baseman / Right fielder
- Born: 1897; Havana, Cuba
- Threw: Right

Negro league baseball debut
- 1920, for the Cuban Stars (East)

Last appearance
- 1922, for the Cuban Stars (East)
- Stats at Baseball Reference

Teams
- Cuban Stars (East) (1920); Cuban Stars (West) (1921); Cuban Stars (East) (1922)

Eusebio Jiménez Peñalver (1897 – death unknown) was a Cuban professional baseball third baseman, second baseman and right fielder in the Negro leagues and Cuban League in the 1920s.

A native of Havana, Cuba, Jiménez made his Negro leagues debut in 1920 with the Cuban Stars (East). He played for the Cuban Stars (West) in 1921 before returning to the East club in 1922, and played briefly for Habana of the Cuban League to finish his career.
