= Eusebio Cuerno de la Cantolla =

Spanish journalist and businessman

Eusebio Cuerno de la Cantolla (1850–1922) was a Spanish journalist, businessman and theatrical actor. He was known as Eusebio Sierra, a stage name to which he annexed his grandfathers name.

He was born in Santander, on July 10, 1850, studying his bachelor's degree in this city. Then he moved to Madrid where he studied law. In 1879 he married Eugenia Riaño, from the Cantabrian town of Liérganes, linked to the family that created the Electra Pasiega, whose Board of Directors he would also preside over. He died in Santander in 1922.

He collaborated in various newspapers, directed the newspaper La Atalaya and was the founder of the Press Association in this city. In Madrid, he co-founded the Society of Spanish Authors in 1899 to protect himself from the abuses of the owners of theaters and archives, the foundation of what would be the General Society of Authors and Publishers.
