= Eusebio Blankendal =

Bermudan footballer

Personal information
- Date of birth: 3 November 1998 (age 28)
- Place of birth: Bermuda
- Position: Defender

Team information
- Current team: Dandy Town Hornets

Senior career*
Years	Team	Apps	(Gls)
2016–	Dandy Town Hornets		

International career^{‡}
2019–	Bermuda	3	(0)
- * Club domestic league appearances and goals ‡ National team caps and goals as of 06:09, 26 March 2021 (UTC)

Eusebio Blankendal (born 3 November 1998) is a Bermudian footballer who plays as a defender for Dandy Town Hornets and the Bermuda national team.

== Club career ==
Blankendal began his club career with Dandy Town Hornets. He was influential in their 5–2 victory over Robin Hood in the 2019 Dudley Eve Trophy Final, nine days before earning his first international cap.

He has also played in the Bermuda Men's Futsal League with Atletico CP.

== International career ==
Blankendal received his first callup to the Bermuda national team in November 2019 as one of three emergency replacement players summoned by manager Kyle Lightbourne ahead of their final game in the CONCACAF Nations League group stage. He made his senior international debut on 19 November as the starting left-back in their 2–1 loss to Mexico.

Blankendal later participated in the 2022 FIFA World Cup qualifiers, during which he wore the captain's armband for the first time in a 6–0 defeat to Suriname. He served in his role on an interim basis following an injury to Lejuan Simmons, and was retained as captain for their final qualifier against the Cayman Islands a few days later.

== Career statistics ==
=== International ===
As of match played 26 March 2021.

National team	Year	Apps	Goals
Bermuda	2019	1	0
Bermuda	2020	1	0
Bermuda	2021	1	0
Total		3	0

== Honours ==
=== Club ===
Dandy Town Hornets

- Dudley Eve Trophy: 2019

== Personal life ==
Blankendal attended The Berkeley Institute, and interned with local IT firm Oxygen during his studies.
