= Eusebius Gallicanus =

Eusebius Gallicanus is the fictitious author of a collection of seventy-six religious sermons in Latin compiled in Gaul during Late Antiquity or the Early Middle Ages. The collection must not be confused with that by Pseudo-Eusebius of Alexandria, a collection of homilies also attributed to an unidentified "Eusebius", but these latter homilies were originally in Greek and were translated into Latin, and oriental languages, while "Eusebius Gallicanus" is purely Latin. Some manuscripts give as the author a mysterious "Eusebius" (who was identified in the Middle Ages with Eusebius of Emesa), but it is clear that many of these sermons were by various preachers active in Gaul in the 5th century (with later revisions). The only name that is unanimously put forward is Faustus of Riez.

== Works ==
The sermons are of various kinds: some are festal homilies, others for the commemorations of saints such as Genesius of Arles, Honoratus of Arles, and Maximus of Riez, while others deal with moral questions or points of Christian doctrine. Ten are addressed to monks, forming a block, nos. 35 to 44. The collection must have been compiled as an anthology of model sermons for the training of preachers. Indeed these texts are not very original in their themes, or even their wording, and identical or similar passages are found throughout. Some are also found in collections of sermons attributed to Caesarius of Arles.

The oldest known manuscript containing the definitive collection is held at the Royal Library of Belgium, and dates from the early 9th century, thus providing a terminus ante quem for the compilation of the entire collection. But an earlier manuscript in the same library (Ms. 9850-9852, copied at the Abbey of Saint-Médard in Soissons at the end of the 7th century ) contains homilies ad monachos nos. 4, 5, 6, and 9, along with another sermon that was completely reworked to form the beginning of homily 7.

There is general agreement that Eusebius Gallicanus is closely linked to the work of Caesarius of Arles (a great preacher of the early 6th century, and author of 238 sermons), but the relationship between the two appears extremely difficult to disentangle: sometimes Eusebius seems to have influenced Caesarius, sometimes the reverse. Thus, homily 6 of the Eusebian collection appears to have served as a model for Caesarius' sermon 206, but conversely, the latter seems to have influenced Eusebius' homily 39(that is, homily 4 ad monachos). In any case, some texts in the Eusebian collection, in the final form they take at the beginning of the 9th century, are later than Caesarius.

According to an analysis first developed by Germain Morin in 1935, the original author of most of the sermons was Faustus of Riez, and Caesarius of Arles supposedly possessed a pre-existing collection. This was also the position of Jean Leroy, author of a thesis on the subject in 1954. According to François Glorie, editor of the collection in the CCSL series, the texts were originally borrowed from various authors of the early Latin Church: Novatian, Cyprian of Carthage, Zeno of Verona, Ambrose of Milan, Augustine of Hippo, Hilary of Arles, Faustus of Riez, Caesarius of Arles himself, and others. The definitive compilation of the collection is thought to have taken place in the 7th or 8th century. According to the more recent monograph by LK Bailey, there would be a plurality of authors, but the all Gallic and essentially from the second half of the 5th century.

The Pseudo-Eusebian homilies appear in no fewer than 477 extant medieval manuscripts. According to L.K. Bailey, they were extremely widespread as models for preachers until the 13th century, when the mendicant orders imposed a new style of preaching.

In the manuscripts, the ten homilies ad monachos were often reproduced separately, sometimes without an author's name, or attributed sometimes to Faustus of Riez, sometimes to Caesarius of Arles, sometimes to Eusebius of Emesa. The first printed edition of the Renaissance concerned these ten homilies, and retained the third author's name: Divi Eusebii episcopi Emiseni Homiliæ decem ad monachos, veteris monastices sanctimonia atque eruditione spectabiles (Cologne, 1531).

In modern times, the collection has been somewhat lost from sight by scholars, perhaps overshadowed by the larger work of Caesarius of Arles: the absence of Eusebius Gallicanus is one of the most remarkable gaps in Jacques Paul Migne's Patrologia Latina..

== Bibliography ==
- François Glorie (ed.), Eusebius Gallicanus. Collectio homiliarum. Sermones extravagantes, Corpus Christianorum, Series Latina 101, 101A and 101B, Brepols, Turnhout, 1970-71.
- Léonard-Alphonse Van Buchem (éd.), L'homélie pseudo-eusébienne de Pentecôte, Nimègue, Drukkerij Gebr. Janssen, 1967.

== Bibliography ==
- G. Morin, "La collection gallicane dite d'Eusèbe d'Émèse et les problèmes qui s'y rattachent", Zeitschrift für die neutestamentliche Wissenschaft, vol. 34, n° 1, 1935, p.92-115.
- Jean Leroy, L'œuvre oratoire de saint Fauste de Riez. La collection gallicane dite d'Eusèbe d'Émèse, PhD thesis, Université de Strasbourg, 1954.
- Lisa Kaaren Bailey, Christianity's Quiet Success : The Eusebius Gallicanus Sermon Collection and the Power of the Church in Late Antique Gaul, University of Notre Dame Press, 2010.
