= List of moths of Turkey =

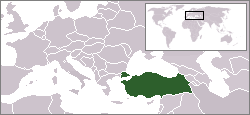
Location of Turkey

There are about 4,200 known moth species of Turkey. The moths (mostly nocturnal) and butterflies (mostly diurnal) together make up the taxonomic order Lepidoptera.

This is a list of moth species which have been recorded in Turkey.

== Micropterigidae ==
- Microptericina amasiella Staudinger, 1880
- Micropterix allionella (Fabricius, 1794)
- Micropterix aruncella Scopoli, 1763
- Micropterix klimeschi Heath, 1973
- Micropterix maschukella Alphéraky, 1870
- Micropterix paykullella Akermann, 1792
- Micropterix schaefferi Heath, 1975
- Micropterix wockei Staudinger, 1870

== Eriocraniidae ==
- Dyseriocrania subpurpurella Haworth, 1828

== Hepialidae ==
- Hepialus humuli (Linnaeus, 1758)
- Korscheltellus lupulinus (Linnaeus, 1758)
- Triodia amasina Herrich-Schäffer, 1851
- Triodia sylvina (Linnaeus, 1761)
- Zenophassus schamyl Christoph, 1888

== Nepticulidae ==
- Ectoedemia caradjai Hering, 1932
- Ectoedemia terebinthivora Klimesch, 1975
- Etainia sericopeza Zeller, 1839
- Fomoria louisae Klimesch, 1978
- Glaucolepis albiflorella Klimesch, 1978
- Stigmella aceris Frey, 1857
- Stigmella azaroli Klimesch, 1978
- Stigmella basiguttella Heinemann, 1862
- Stigmella centifoliella Zeller, 1848
- Stigmella fagella Heinemann, 1862
- Stigmella mespilicola Frey, 1856
- Stigmella minusculella Herrich-Schäffer, [1855]
- Stigmella muricatella Klimesch, 1978
- Stigmella paliurella Gerasimov, 1937
- Stigmella prunetorum Stainton, 1855
- Stigmella pyrellicola Klimesch, 1978
- Stigmella rhamnophila Amsel, 1935
- Stigmella samiatella Zeller, 1839
- Trifurcula eurema Tutt, 1899
- Trifurcula pallidella Zeller, 1845

== Opostegidae ==
- Opostega auritella (Hübner, [1813])
- Opostega crepusculella Zeller, 1839
- Opostega salaciella Treitschke, 1833
- Opostega spatulella Herrich-Schäffer, [1855]

== Tischeriidae ==
- Tischeria angusticollella Duponchel, 1843
- Tischeria ekebladella Bjerkander, 1795
- Tischeria gaunacella Duponchel, 1843
- Tischeria marginea Haworth, 1828

== Heliozelidae ==
- Antispila pfeifferella (Hübner, [1813])

== Incurvariidae ==
- Alloclemensia devotella Rebel, 1893
- Incurvaria masculella ([Denis & Schiffermüller], 1775)

== Prodoxidae ==
- Lampronia koerneriella Zeller, 1839
- Lampronia rubiella Bjerkander, 1781
- Lampronia rupella ([Denis & Schiffermüller], 1775)

== Adelidae ==
- Adela anatolica Rebel, 1902
- Adela annae Zeller, 1853
- Adela auricella Ragonot, 1874
- Adela barbatella Zeller, 1847
- Adela chlorista Meyrick, 1912
- Adela croesella Scopoli, 1763
- Adela dumerilella Duponchel, 1838
- Adela fasciella (Fabricius, 1775)
- Adela fibulella ([Denis & Schiffermüller], 1775)
- Adela florella Staudinger, 1870
- Adela istrianella Heydenreich, 1851
- Adela leucocerella Scopoli, 1763
- Adela mazzolella (Hübner, [1801])
- Adela metallica (Poda, 1761)
- Adela mollella (Hübner, [1816])
- Adela prodigella Mann, 1853
- Adela raddella (Hübner, 1793)
- Adela reaumurella (Linnaeus, 1758)
- Adela repetitella Mann, 1861
- Adela rufifrontella Treitschke, 1833
- Adela rufimitrella Scopoli, 1763
- Adela tridesma Meyrick, 1912
- Nematopogon panzerella (Fabricius, 1794)
- Nematopogon pilella ([Denis & Schiffermüller], 1775)
- Nematopogon robertella Clerck, 1759
- Nematopogon schwarziella Zeller, 1839
- Nematopogon swammerdammella (Linnaeus, 1758)

== Deuterotineidae ==
- Deuterotinea casanella Eversmann, 1844
- Deuterotinea palaestinensis Rebel, 1901
- Deuterotinea paradoxella Staudinger, 1859
- Deuterotinea syriaca Lederer, 1857

== Psychidae ==
- Acanthopsyche atra (Linnaeus, 1767)
- Anaproutia reticulatella Bruand, 1853
- Apterona helicoidella Vallot, 1827
- Bankesia pallida Staudinger, 1879
- Bijugis pectinella ([Denis & Schiffermüller], 1775)
- Dahlica triquetrella (Hübner, [1813])
- Diplodoma laichartingella Goeze, 1783
- Dissoctena granigerella Staudinger, 1859
- Eochorica balcanica Rebel, 1919
- Eumasia parietariella Heydenreich, 1851
- Lepidopsyche unicolor (Hufnagel, 1766)
- Masonia rassei Sieder, 1975
- Megalophanes viciella ([Denis & Schiffermüller], 1775)
- Melasina ciliaris Ochsenheimer, 1810
- Melasina punctatella Bruand, 1853
- Oiketicoides caucasica Bang-Haas, 1921
- Oiketicoides febretta Boyer, 1835
- Oiketicoides lutea Staudinger, 1871
- Oiketicoides senex Staudinger, 1871
- Oiketicoides taurica Wehrli, 1932
- Pachythelia villosella Ochsenheimer, 1810
- Penestoglossa tauricella Rebel, 1935
- Phalacropterix bruandi Lederer, 1855
- Psyche casta Pallas, 1767
- Psyche crassiorella Bruand, [1851]
- Ptilocephala mediterranea Lederer, 1853
- Ptilocephala plumifera Ochsenheimer, 1810
- Rebelia surientella Bruand, 1858
- Reisseronia flavociliella Mann, 1864
- Taleporia pseudoimprovisella Freina & Witt, 1984
- Taleporia tubulosa Retzius, 1783

== Eriocottidae ==
- Eriocottis fuscanella Zeller, 1847

== Tineidae ==
- Anemallota praetoriella Christoph, 1872
- Anemapogon quercicolella Herrich-Schäffer, [1851]
- Ateliotum cypellias Meyrick, 1937
- Ateliotum hungaricellum Zeller, 1839
- Ateliotum syriacum Caradja, 1920
- Cephimallota angusticostella Zeller, 1839
- Cephimallota crassiflavella Bruand, 1851
- Cephimallota libanotica Petersen, 1959
- Cephimallota tunesiella Zagulyaev, 1966
- Ceratuncus affinitellus Rebel, 1901
- Ceratuncus danubiellus Mann, 1866
- Crassicornella crassicornella Zeller, 1847
- Edosa ditella Pierce & Diakonoff, 1938
- Edosa fuscoviolacella Ragonot, 1895
- Edosa lardatella Lederer, 1858
- Eudarcia forsteri Petersen, 1964
- Euplocamus anthracinalis Scopoli, 1763
- Euplocamus delagrangei Ragonot, 1895
- Euplocamus ophisus Cramer, [1779]
- Fermocelina inquinatella Zeller, 1852
- Fermocelina latiusculella Stainton, 1867
- Haplotinea ditella Pierce & Diakonoff, 1938
- Haplotinea insectella (Fabricius, 1794)
- Hapsifera luridella Zeller, 1847
- Hapsifera multiguttella Ragonot, 1895
- Infurcitinea albicomella Stainton, 1851
- Infurcitinea anatolica Petersen, 1968
- Infurcitinea nedae Gaedike, 1983
- Infurcitinea nigropluviella Walsingham, 1907
- Infurcitinea rumelicella Rebel, 1903
- Infurcitinea tauridella Petersen, 1968
- Infurcitinea turcica Petersen, 1968
- Lichenotinea pustulatella Zeller, 1852
- Monopis imella (Hübner, [1813])
- Monopis laevigella ([Denis & Schiffermüller], 1775)
- Monopis meleodes Meyrick, 1917
- Monopis ustella Haworth, 1828
- Morophaga choragella ([Denis & Schiffermüller], 1775)
- Morophaga morella Duponchel, 1838
- Morophagoides orientalis Petersen,
- Myrmecozela lutosella Eversmann, 1844
- Nemapogon anatolica Gaedike, 1986
- Nemapogon arenbergeri Gaedike, 1986
- Nemapogon cloacella Haworth, 1828
- Nemapogon gliriella Heyden, 1865
- Nemapogon granella (Linnaeus, 1758)
- Nemapogon gravosaellus Petersen, 1957
- Nemapogon hungaricus Gozmany, 1960
- Nemapogon inconditella Lucas, 1956
- Nemapogon kasyi Gaedike, 1986
- Nemapogon levantina Petersen, 1961
- Nemapogon orientalis Petersen, 1961
- Nemapogon ruricolella Stainton, 1849
- Nemapogon signatella Petersen, 1957
- Nemapogon teberdellus Zagulyaev, 1963
- Nemapogon variatella Clemens, 1859
- Nemapogon vartianae Gaedike, 1986
- Neomeessia gracilis Petersen, 1968
- Neurothaumasia ankerella Mann, 1867
- Niditinea fuscipunctella Haworth, 1828
- Novotinea fasciata Staudinger, 1879
- Opogona panchalcella Staudinger, 1871
- Paratinea merdella Zeller, 1847
- Perissomastix wiltshirella Petersen, 1964
- Reisserita relicinella Herrich-Schäffer, [1851]
- Rhodobates laevigatellus Herrich-Schäffer, [1854]
- Rhodobates pallipalpellus Rebel, 1901
- Tinea basifasciella Ragonot, 1895
- Tinea flavescentella Haworth, 1828
- Tinea murariella Staudinger, 1859
- Tinea pellionella Linnaeus, 1758
- Triaxomera fulvimitrella Sodoffsky, 1830
- Triaxomera parasitella (Hübner, 1796)
- Trichophaga bipartitella Ragonot, 1892
- Trichophaga tapetzella (Linnaeus, 1758)

== Bucculatricidae ==
- Bucculatrix albedinella Zeller, 1839
- Bucculatrix anthemidella Deschka, 1972
- Bucculatrix basifuscella Staudinger, 1880
- Bucculatrix crataegi Zeller, 1839
- Bucculatrix infans Staudinger, 1880
- Bucculatrix nigricomella Zeller, 1839
- Bucculatrix oppositella Staudinger, 1880
- Bucculatrix pseudosylvella Rebel, 1941
- Bucculatrix ulmella Zeller, 1848

== Douglasiidae ==
- Klimeschia cinereipunctella Turati & Fiori, 1930
- Klimeschia transversella Zeller, 1839
- Klimeschia vibratoriella Mann, 1862
- Tinagma anchusellum Benander, 1936
- Tinagma columbellum Staudinger, 1880
- Tinagma minutissimum Staudinger, 1880
- Tinagma ocnerostomellum Stainton, 1850

== Gracillariidae ==
- Acrocercops brongniardella (Fabricius, 1798)
- Aspilapteryx tringipennella Zeller, 1839
- Callisto denticulella Thunberg, 1794
- Caloptilia alchimilella Scopoli, 1763
- Caloptilia braccatella Staudinger, 1870
- Caloptilia coruscans Walsingham, 1907
- Caloptilia cuculipennella (Hübner, 1796)
- Caloptilia elongella (Linnaeus, 1761)
- Caloptilia fidella Reutti, 1853
- Caloptilia fribergensis Fritzsche, 1871
- Caloptilia hemidactylella ([Denis & Schiffermüller], 1775)
- Caloptilia mutilata Staudinger, 1879
- Caloptilia onustella (Hübner, [1813])
- Caloptilia pallescens Staudinger, 1879
- Caloptilia rhodinella Herrich-Schäffer, [1854]
- Caloptilia roscipennella (Hübner, 1796)
- Caloptilia stigmatella (Fabricius, 1781)
- Calybites auroguttella Stephens, 1835
- Calybites quadrisignella Zeller, 1839
- Cupedia cupediella Herrich-Schäffer, 1855
- Dialectica imperialella Mann, 1847
- Dialectica scalariella Zeller, 1850
- Gracillaria syringella (Fabricius, 1794)
- Micrurapteryx kollariella Zeller, 1839
- Parornix anglicella Stainton, 1850
- Parornix anguliferella Zeller, 1847
- Parornix devoniella Stainton, 1850
- Parornix finitimella Zeller, 1850
- Parornix oculata (Triberti, 1979)
- Parornix torquillella Zeller, 1850
- Phyllocnistis unipunctella Stephens, 1834
- Phyllonorycter abrasella Duponchel, 1843
- Phyllonorycter acaciella Duponchel, [1843]
- Phyllonorycter acerifoliella Zeller, 1839
- Phyllonorycter anatolica Deschka, 1970
- Phyllonorycter belotella Staudinger, 1859
- Phyllonorycter cerasicolella Herrich-Schäffer, 1855
- Phyllonorycter corylifoliella (Hübner, 1796)
- Phyllonorycter deleta Staudinger, 1880
- Phyllonorycter emberizaepennella Bouché, 1834
- Phyllonorycter flava Deschka, 1975
- Phyllonorycter fraxinella Zeller, 1846
- Phyllonorycter gerasimovi Hering, 1930
- Phyllonorycter harrisella (Linnaeus, 1761)
- Phyllonorycter helianthemella Herrich-Schäffer, 1861
- Phyllonorycter klemannella (Fabricius, 1781)
- Phyllonorycter kusdasi Deschka, 1970
- Phyllonorycter lautella Zeller, 1846
- Phyllonorycter maestingella (Müller, 1764)
- Phyllonorycter mannii Zeller, 1846
- Phyllonorycter messaniella Zeller, 1846
- Phyllonorycter millierella Staudinger, 1870
- Phyllonorycter muelleriella Zeller, 1839
- Phyllonorycter nivalis Deschka, 1986
- Phyllonorycter oxyacanthae Frey, 1856
- Phyllonorycter platani Staudinger, 1871
- Phyllonorycter pyrispinosae Deschka, 1986
- Phyllonorycter quercifoliella Zeller, 1839
- Phyllonorycter quinnata Geoffroy, 1785
- Phyllonorycter roboris Zeller, 1849
- Phyllonorycter saportella Duponchel, [1840]
- Phyllonorycter schreberella (Fabricius, 1781)
- Phyllonorycter trifasciella Haworth, 1828
- Polymitia eximipalpella Gerasimov, 1930
- Povolnya leucopennella Stephens, 1835
- Sabulopteryx inquinata Triberti, 1985
- Sabulopteryx limosella Duponchel, 1843
- Sauterina hofmanniella Schleich, 1867
- Spulerina simploniella F.R., [1840]

== Roeslerstammiidae ==
- Roeslerstammia pronubella ([Denis & Schiffermüller], 1775)

== Pterolonchidae ==
- Pterolonche albescens Zeller, 1847
- Pterolonche inspersa Staudinger, 1859
- Pterolonche pulverulenta Zeller, 1847

== Agonoxenidae ==
- Chrysoclista linneella (Linnaeus, 1761)
- Spuleria flavicaput Haworth, 1828

== Batrachedridae ==
- Batrachedra ledereriella Zeller, 1850

== Blastobasidae ==
- Blastobasis phycidella Zeller, 1839
- Holcocera inunctella Zeller, 1839

== Coleophoridae ==
About 187 species – see: List of moths of Turkey (Coleophoridae)

== Elachistidae ==
- Elachista adscitella Stainton, 1851
- Elachista albifrontella (Hübner, [1817])
- Elachista anatoliensis Traugott-Olsen, 1990
- Elachista anserinella Zeller, 1839
- Elachista argentella Clerck, 1759
- Elachista atrisquamosa Staudinger, 1880
- Elachista blancella Traugott-Olsen, 1992
- Elachista chionella Mann, 1861
- Elachista chrysodesmella Zeller, 1850
- Elachista cingillella Herrich-Schäffer, [1855]
- Elachista collitella Duponchel, [1843]
- Elachista contaminatella Zeller, 1847
- Elachista deceptricula Staudinger, 1880
- Elachista deresyensis Traugott-Olsen, 1988
- Elachista disertella Herrich-Schäffer, [1855]
- Elachista dispilella Zeller, 1839
- Elachista dispositella Frey, 1859
- Elachista festucicolella Zeller, 1853
- Elachista flavescens Parenti, 1981
- Elachista gangabella Zeller, 1850
- Elachista gebzeensis Traugott-Olsen, 1990
- Elachista gleichenella (Fabricius, 1781)
- Elachista griseella Zeller, 1850
- Elachista grotenfelti Kaila, 2012
- Elachista incanella Herrich-Schäffer, [1855]
- Elachista kleini Amsel, 1935
- Elachista maculata Parenti, 1978
- Elachista melancholica Frey, 1859
- Elachista minusculella Traugott-Olsen, 1992
- Elachista monosemiella Roesler, 1881
- Elachista nuraghella Amsel, 1935
- Elachista pollinariella Zeller, 1839
- Elachista pollutella Herrich-Schäffer, [1855]
- Elachista pollutissima Staudinger, 1880
- Elachista revinctella Zeller, 1850
- Elachista rudectella Stainton, 1851
- Elachista rufocinerea Haworth, 1828
- Elachista turkensis Traugott-Olsen, 1990
- Elachista unifasciella Haworth, 1828
- Elachista vegliae Parenti, 1978
- Elachista zonariella Tensgtröm, 1847
- Perittia echiella de Joannis, 1902
- Perittia huemeri (Traugott-Olsen, 1990)
- Perittia junnilaisella Kaila, 2009
- Perittia karadaghella Sinev & Budashkin, 1991
- Perittia ravida Kaila, 2009
- Stephensia abbreviatella Stainton, 1851
- Stephensia brunnichiella (Linnaeus, 1767)

== Oecophoridae ==
- Agonopterix adspersella Kollar, 1832
- Agonopterix alstroemeriana Clerck, 1759
- Agonopterix assimilella Treitschke, 1832
- Agonopterix atomella ([Denis & Schiffermüller], 1775)
- Agonopterix capreolella Zeller, 1839
- Agonopterix cnicella Treitschke, 1832
- Agonopterix comitella Lederer, 1855
- Agonopterix despoliatella Erschoff, 1874
- Agonopterix epicachritis Ragonot, 1895
- Agonopterix flavella (Hübner, 1796)
- Agonopterix furvella Treitschke, 1832
- Agonopterix imbutella Christoph, 1888
- Agonopterix kaekeritziana (Linnaeus, 1767)
- Agonopterix latipennella Zerny, 1934
- Agonopterix nanatella Stainton, 1849
- Agonopterix nervosa Haworth, [1811]
- Agonopterix pavida Meyrick, 1913
- Agonopterix purpurea Haworth, [1811]
- Agonopterix ramosella Stainton, 1867
- Agonopterix rotundella Douglas, 1846
- Agonopterix rutana (Fabricius, 1794)
- Agonopterix squamosa Mann, 1864
- Agonopterix subpropinquella Stainton, 1849
- Agonopterix subumbellana Heinemann, 1959
- Agonopterix thapsiella Zeller, 1847
- Agonopterix xyleuta Meyrick, 1913
- Agonopterix zephyrella (Hübner, [1813])
- Alabonia kindermanni Herrich-Schäffer, [1855]
- Alabonia staintoniella Zeller, 1850
- Amselina cedestiella Zeller, 1868
- Amselina emir Gozmany, 1961
- Amselina minorita Gozmany, 1968
- Amselina olympi Gozmany, 1957
- Amselina parapsesta Gozmany, 1986
- Anchinia grandis Stainton, 1867
- Apatema mediopallidum Walsingham, 1900
- Apiletria endopercna Meyrick, 1936
- Apiletria luella Lederer, 1855
- Apiletria purulentella Stainton, 1867
- Aprominta aga Gozmany, 1962
- Aprominta arenbergeri Gozmany, 1968
- Aprominta bifasciata Staudinger, 1871
- Aprominta designatella Herrich-Schäffer, [1855]
- Aprominta syriacella Ragonot, 1895
- Arragonia anatolica Gozmany, 1986
- Athopeutis crinitella Herrich-Schäffer, [1855]
- Batia lunaris Haworth, 1828
- Borkhausenia cinerariella Mann, 1859
- Borkhausenia coeruleopicta Christoph, 1888
- Borkhausenia haasi Rebel, 1902
- Borkhausenia minutella (Linnaeus, 1758)
- Borkhausenia trigutta Christoph, 1888
- Cacochroa permixtella Herrich-Schäffer, [1855]
- Callima icterinella Mann, 1867
- Carcina quercana (Fabricius, 1775)
- Crossotocera wagnerella Zerny, 1930
- Denisia similella (Hübner, 1796)
- Depressaria badiella (Hübner, 1796)
- Depressaria chaerophylli Zeller, 1839
- Depressaria corticinella Zeller, 1854
- Depressaria depressella (Hübner, [1813])
- Depressaria douglasella Stainton, 1849
- Depressaria floridella Mann, 1864
- Depressaria hirtipalpis Zeller, 1854
- Depressaria hofmanni Stainton, 1861
- Depressaria marcella Rebel, 1901
- Depressaria tenebricosa Zeller, 1854
- Depressaria veneficella Zeller, 1847
- Depressaria zelleri Staudinger, 1879
- Diurnea fagella ([Denis & Schiffermüller], 1775)
- Donaspastus undecimpunctellus Mann, 1864
- Dysspastus cinerascens Gozmany, 1968
- Endrosis sarcitrella (Linnaeus, 1758)
- Eratophyes amasiella Herrich-Schäffer, [1855]
- Esperia imitatrix Zeller, 1847
- Esperia intermediella Stainton, 1867
- Esperia oliviella (Fabricius, 1794)
- Esperia sulphurella (Fabricius, 1775)
- Exaeretia ledereri Zeller, 1854
- Exaeretia lutosella Herrich-Schäffer, [1854]
- Exaeretia nigromaculata Hannemann, 1989
- Fabiola pokornyi Nickerl, 1864
- Harpella eseliensis Rebel, 1908
- Harpella forficella Scopoli, 1763
- Hecestoptera kyra Gozmany, 1961
- Holcopogon bubulcellus Staudinger, 1859
- Holoscolia berytella Rebel, 1902
- Holoscolia huebneri Koçak, 1980
- Holoscolia majorella Rebel, 1902
- Horridopalpus radiatus Staudinger, 1879
- Hypercallia citrinalis Scopoli, 1763
- Mylothra pyrrhella Ragonot, 1895
- Oecogonia caradjai Popescu-Gorj & Capuse, 1965
- Oecophora bractella (Linnaeus, 1758)
- Orophia denisella ([Denis & Schiffermüller], 1775)
- Orophia sordidella (Hübner, 1796)
- Pleurota amaniella Mann, 1873
- Pleurota armeniella Caradja, 1920
- Pleurota christophi Lvovskiy, 1993
- Pleurota eximia Lederer, 1861
- Pleurota generosella Rebel, 1901
- Pleurota issicella Staudinger, 1879
- Pleurota malatya Back, 1973
- Pleurota metricella Zeller, 1847
- Pleurota pungitiella Herrich-Schäffer, [1854]
- Pleurota pyropella ([Denis & Schiffermüller], 1775)
- Pleurota tristatella Staudinger, 1871
- Pleurota tristictella Seebold, 1898
- Protasis punctella Costa, [1846]
- Pseudatemelia flavifrontella (Denis & Schiffermüller, 1775)
- Pseudatemelia sordida Staudinger, 1879
- Schiffermuelleria irroratella Staudinger, 1879
- Schiffermuelleria schaefferella (Linnaeus, 1758)
- Semioscopis osthelderi Rebel, 1935
- Symmoca caliginella Mann, 1867
- Symmoca deprinsi Gozmány, 2001
- Symmoca latiusculella Stainton, 1867
- Symmoca salinata Gozmany, 1986
- Symmoca sparsella de Joannis, 1891
- Symmoca straminella Gozmany, 1986
- Symmoca vitiosella Zeller, 1868
- Telechrysis tripuncta Haworth, 1828

== Ethmiidae ==
- Ethmia amasina Staudinger, 1879
- Ethmia aurifluella (Hübner, [1801])
- Ethmia bipunctella (Fabricius, 1775)
- Ethmia candidella Alphéraky, 1908
- Ethmia caradjae Rebel, 1907
- Ethmia chrysopyga Zeller, 1844
- Ethmia defreinai Ganev, 1984
- Ethmia distigmatella Erschoff, 1874
- Ethmia dodecea Haworth, 1828
- Ethmia fumidella Wocke, 1850
- Ethmia funerella (Fabricius, 1787)
- Ethmia haemorrhoidella Eversmann, 1844
- Ethmia hakkarica Koçak, 1986
- Ethmia infelix Meyrick, 1914
- Ethmia iranella Zerny, 1940
- Ethmia pseudoscythrella Rebel, 1902
- Ethmia pusiella (Linnaeus, 1758)
- Ethmia quadrinotella Mann, 1861
- Ethmia rothschildi Rebel, 1912
- Ethmia similis Sattler, 1967
- Ethmia suspecta Sattler, 1867
- Ethmia terminella T. B. Fletcher, 1938
- Ethmia treitschkeella Staudinger, 1879
- Ethmia tripunctella Staudinger, 1879

== Gelechiidae ==
- Acanthophila alacella Duponchel, 1838
- Acompsia cinerella Clerck, 1759
- Anacampsis obscurella ([Denis & Schiffermüller], 1775)
- Anacampsis populella Clerck, 1759
- Anarsia aleurodes Meyrick, 1922
- Anarsia lineatella Zeller, 1839
- Anarsia spartiella Schrank, 1802
- Apatetris mirabella Staudinger, 1880
- Apodia bifractella Duponchel, [1843]
- Aproaerema anthyllidella (Hübner, [1813])
- Aproaerema cincticulella Herrich-Schäffer, [1855]
- Aristotelia arnoldella Rebel, 1905
- Aristotelia brucinella Mann, 1872
- Aristotelia cupreella Zerny, 1934
- Aristotelia decoratella Staudinger, 1879
- Aristotelia decurtella (Hübner, [1813])
- Aristotelia euprepella Zerny, 1934
- Aristotelia fervidella Mann, 1864
- Aristotelia jactatrix Meyrick, 1926
- Aristotelia maculata Staudinger, 1879
- Aristotelia osthelderi Rebel, 1935
- Aristotelia pancaliella Staudinger, 1870
- Aristotelia parvula Staudinger, 1879
- Aristotelia punctatella Staudinger, 1879
- Aristotelia remissella Zeller, 1847
- Aristotelia retusella Rebel, 1891
- Aristotelia servella Zeller, 1839
- Aristotelia striatopunctella Rebel, 1891
- Aristotelia subericinella Herrich-Schäffer, [1855]
- Aristotelia unifasciella Rebel, 1929
- Aroga aristotelis Milliere, 1875
- Aroga pascuicola Staudinger, 1871
- Aroga velocella Duponchel, 1838
- Bryotropha desertella Douglas, 1850
- Bryotropha dryadella Zeller, 1850
- Bryotropha terrella ([Denis & Schiffermüller], 1775)
- Caryocolum albithoracellum Huemer, 1989
- Caryocolum anatolicum Huemer, 1989
- Caryocolum gypsophilae Stainton, 1869
- Caryocolum horoscopa Meyrick, 1926
- Caryocolum iranicum Huemer, 1989
- Ceuthomadarus tenebrionellus Mann, 1864
- Chionodes distinctella Zeller, 1839
- Chionodes hayreddini Koçak, 1985
- Chrysoesthia drurella (Fabricius, 1775)
- Chrysoesthia sexguttella Thunberg, 1794
- Coloptilia conchylidella Hofmann, [1898]
- Compsolechia scintillella F.R., 1841
- Compsolechia subsequella (Hübner, 1796)
- Crossobela trinotella Herrich-Schäffer, [1856]
- Deroxena venosulella Moeschler, 1862
- Dichomeris barbella ([Denis & Schiffermüller], 1775)
- Dichomeris derasella ([Denis & Schiffermüller], 1775)
- Dichomeris juniperella (Linnaeus, 1761)
- Dichomeris limosella Schläger, 1849
- Dichomeris unguiculatus (Fabricius, 1798)
- Dirhinosia arnoldiella (Rebel, 1905)
- Dirhinosia cervinella (Eversmann, 1844)
- Dirhinosia nitidula (Stainton, 1867)
- Dirhinosia unifasciella (Rebel, 1929)
- Ephysteris deserticolella Staudinger, 1870
- Ephysteris promptella Staudinger, 1859
- Epilechia magnetella Staudinger, 1870
- Ergasiola ergasima Meyrick, 1916
- Eulamprotes superbella Zeller, 1839
- Eulamprotes wilkella (Linnaeus, 1758)
- Eurodachtha flavissimella Mann, 1862
- Eurodachtha nigralba Gozmany, 1978
- Euscrobipalpa acuminatella Sircom, 1850
- Euscrobipalpa artemisiella Treitschke, 1933
- Euscrobipalpa atriplicella F.R., 1841
- Euscrobipalpa chetitica Povolny, 1974
- Euscrobipalpa dividella Rebel, 1936
- Euscrobipalpa erichi Povolny, 1964
- Euscrobipalpa grossa Povolny, 1966
- Euscrobipalpa obsoletella F.R., 1841
- Euscrobipalpa ocellatella Boyd, 1858
- Euscrobipalpa pulchra Povolny, 1967
- Euscrobipalpa smithi Povolny & Bradley, 1964
- Euscrobipalpa vladimiri Povolny, 1966
- Evippe penicillata Amsel, 1961
- Filatima spurcella Duponchel, 1843
- Gelechia fuscantella Heinemann, 1870
- Gelechia indignella Staudinger, 1879
- Gelechia invenustella Berg., 1875
- Gelechia pistaciae Filipjev, 1933
- Gelechia repetitrix Meyrick, 1931
- Gelechia sabinella Zeller, 1839
- Gelechia senticetella Staudinger, 1859
- Gelechia stramentella Rebel, 1935
- Gnorimoschema antiquum Povolny, 1966
- Gnorimoschema tetrameris Meyrick, 1926
- Homaloxestis briantiella Turati, 1879
- Homaloxestis hades Gozmany, 1978
- Inotica gaesata Meyrick, 1913
- Isophrictis anthemidella Wocke, 1871
- Isophrictis invisella Constant, 1885
- Isophrictis kefersteiniellus Zeller, 1850
- Isophrictis lineatellus Zeller, 1850
- Isophrictis striatella ([Denis & Schiffermüller], 1775)
- Iwaruna biguttella Duponchel, 1843
- Lecithocera anatolica Gozmany, 1978
- Lecithocera nigrana Duponchel, 1836
- Lecithocera syriella Gozmany, 1978
- Megacraspedus argyroneurellus Staudinger, 1870
- Megacraspedus attritellus Staudinger, 1870
- Megacraspedus imparellus F.R., 1837
- Megacraspedus incertellus Rebel, 1930
- Megacraspedus monolorellus Rebel, 1906
- Megacraspedus separatellus F.R., 1837
- Mesophleps pudicellus Mann, 1861
- Mesophleps pyropella (Hübner, 1793)
- Metanarsia modesta Staudinger, 1870
- Metzneria aestivella Zeller, 1839
- Metzneria agraphella Ragonot, 1895
- Metzneria aprilella Herrich-Schäffer, [1850]
- Metzneria ehikeella Gozmany, 1954
- Metzneria intestinella Mann, 1864
- Metzneria litigiosella Milliere, 1879
- Metzneria metzneriella Stainton, 1851
- Metzneria paucipunctella Zeller, 1839
- Metzneria tenuiella Mann, 1864
- Mirificarma aflavella Duponchel, 1844
- Mirificarma eburnella ([Denis & Schiffermüller], 1775)
- Mirificarma lentiginosella Zeller, 1839
- Mirificarma maculatella (Hübner, 1796)
- Mirificarma rhodoptera Mann, 1866
- Monochroa lutulentella Zeller, 1839
- Monochroa tenebrella (Hübner, [1817])
- Neofaculta confidella Rebel, 1935
- Neofaculta ericetella Geyer, [1832]
- Neofaculta stictella Rebel
- Neofriseria sceptrophora Meyrick, 1926
- Nothris chinganella Christoph, 1882
- Nothris sabulosella Rebel, 1935
- Nothris sulcella Staudinger, 1879
- Nothris verbascella Brahm, 1791
- Onebala lamprostoma Zeller, 1847
- Ornativalva heluanensis Debski, 1913
- Ornativalva mixolitha Meyrick, 1918
- Ornativalva ochraceofusca Sattler, 1967
- Ornativalva ornatella Sattler, 1967
- Ornativalva plutelliformis Staudinger, 1859
- Palumbina guerinii Stainton, 1857
- Pexicopia umbrella ([Denis & Schiffermüller], 1775)
- Phthorimaea sabulosella Rebel, 1906
- Platyedra gossypiella Saunders, 1843
- Platyedra subcinerea Haworth, 1828
- Platyedra vilella Zeller, 1847
- Pogochaetia solitaria Staudinger, 1879
- Prolita solutella Zeller, 1839
- Prolita virgella Thunberg, 1794
- Pseudotelphusa fugitivella Zeller, 1839
- Pseudotelphusa scalella Scopoli, 1763
- Psoricoptera gibbosella Stainton, 1854
- Ptocheuusa campicolella Mann, 1857
- Ptocheuusa paupella Zeller, 1847
- Recurvaria leucatella Clerck, 1759
- Recurvaria nanella ([Denis & Schiffermüller], 1775)
- Scrobipalpa anatolica Povolny, 1973
- Scrobipalpa bazae Povolny, 1977
- Scrobipalpa bryophiloides Povolny, 1966
- Scrobipalpa fraterna Povolny, 1973
- Scrobipalpa halophila Povolny, 1973
- Scrobipalpa heliopa Lower, 1900
- Scrobipalpa heretica Povolny, 1973
- Scrobipalpa meteorica Povolny, 1984
- Scrobipalpa nana Povolny, 1973
- Scrobipalpa remota Povolny, 1972
- Scrobipalpula psilella Herrich-Schäffer, [1854]
- Sitotroga cerealella Olivier, 1789
- Sophronia consanguinella Herrich-Schäffer, [1855]
- Sophronia finitimella Rebel, 1906
- Sophronia humerella ([Denis & Schiffermüller], 1775)
- Sophronia illustrella (Hübner, 1796)
- Stenolechia gemmella (Linnaeus, 1758)
- Stenolechia nigrinotella Zeller, 1847
- Stenolechia sagittella Caradja, 1920
- Stomopteryx detersella Zeller, 1847
- Stomopteryx patruella Mann, 1857
- Syncopacma captivella Herrich-Schäffer, [1854]
- Syncopacma coronillella Treitschke, 1833
- Syncopacma maraschella Caradja, 1920
- Syncopacma polychromella Rebel, 1902
- Syncopacma sangiella Stainton, 1863
- Syncopacma splendens Staudinger, 1881
- Syncopacma syncrita Meyrick, 1926
- Syncopacma taeniolella Zeller, 1839
- Syncopacma vorticella Scopoli, 1763
- Teleiodes decorella Haworth, 1812
- Teleiodes luculella (Hübner, [1813])
- Teleiodes ostentella Zerny, 1933
- Teleiodes paripunctella Thunberg, 1794
- Teleiodes proximella (Hübner, 1796)
- Teleiodes vulgella ([Denis & Schiffermüller], 1775)
- Teleiopsis bagriotella Duponchel, [1840]
- Teleiopsis diffinis Haworth, 1828
- Teleiopsis latisacculus Pitkin, 1988
- Teleiopsis terebinthinella Herrich-Schäff., [1856]
- Telphusa comedonella Staudinger, 1879
- Telphusa mersinella Staudinger, 1879
- Telphusa praedicata Meyrick, 1923
- Telphusa wagneriella Rebel, 1926
- Tila sequanda Povolny, 1974
- Turcopalpa glaseri Povolny, 1973
- Xenolechia scriptella (Hübner, 1796)
- Xenolechia tristis Staudinger, 1879
- Xystophora arundinetella Stainton, 1858
- Xystophora carchariella Zeller, 1839

== Xyloryctidae ==
- Odites kollarella Costa, [1836]

== Momphidae ==
- Mompha lacteella Stephens, 1834
- Mompha miscella ([Denis & Schiffermüller], 1775)
- Mompha subbistrigella Haworth, 1828

== Cosmopterigidae ==
- Allotalanta autophaea Meyrick, 1913
- Ascalenia vanelloides Gerasimov, 1930
- Coccidiphila ledereriella Zeller, 1850
- Cosmopterix scribaiella Zeller, 1850
- Cosmopterix zieglerella (Hübner, [1810])
- Eteobalea albiapicella Duponchel, 1843
- Eteobalea beata Walsingham, 1907
- Eteobalea dohrnii Zeller, 1847
- Eteobalea intermediella Riedl, 1966
- Eteobalea isabellella Costa, 1836
- Eteobalea serratella Treitschke, 1833
- Eteobalea sumptuosella Lederer, 1855
- Pancalia leuwenhoekella (Linnaeus, 1761)
- Pancalia nodosella Mann, 1854
- Pyroderces argyrogrammos Zeller, 1847
- Sorhagenia lophyrella Douglas, 1846
- Sorhagenia rhamniella Zeller, 1839
- Tolliella fulguritella Ragonot, 1895
- Vulcaniella cognatella Riedl, 1991
- Vulcaniella fiordalisa Petry, 1904
- Vulcaniella glaseri Riedl, 1966
- Vulcaniella grabowiella Staudinger, 1859
- Vulcaniella pomposella Zeller, 1839

== Scythridae ==
- Scythris aerariella Herrich-Schäffer, [1854]
- Scythris amphonycella Geyer, [1836]
- Scythris anomaloptera Staudinger, 1880
- Scythris apicalis Zeller, 1847
- Scythris asiatica Staudinger, 1880
- Scythris basistrigella Staudinger, 1880
- Scythris canescens Staudinger, 1880
- Scythris caramani Staudinger, 1880
- Scythris cupreella Staudinger, 1859
- Scythris discimaculella Rebel, 1935
- Scythris dissimilella Herrich-Schäffer, [1855]
- Scythris emichi Anker, 1870
- Scythris fallacella Schläger, 1847
- Scythris flabella Mann, 1861
- Scythris flaviventrella Herrich-Schäffer, 1850
- Scythris gravotella Zeller, 1847
- Scythris iconiensis Rebel, 1903
- Scythris jaeckhi Bengtsson, 1989
- Scythris limbella (Fabricius, 1775)
- Scythris moldavicella Rebel, 1906
- Scythris monochreella Ragonot, 1895
- Scythris obscurella Scopoli, 1763
- Scythris ottomana Jäckh, 1978
- Scythris paelopyga Staudinger, 1880
- Scythris pascuella Zeller, 1852
- Scythris pfeifferella Rebel, 1935
- Scythris platypyga Staudinger, 1880
- Scythris punctivittella Costa, [1836]
- Scythris seliniella Zeller, 1839
- Scythris senescens Stainton, 1854
- Scythris subclavella Rebel, 1900
- Scythris subfasciata Staudinger, 1880
- Scythris tabescentella Staudinger, 1880
- Scythris tabidella Herrich-Schäffer, [1854]
- Scythris taurella Caradja, 1920
- Scythris tenuisquamata Staudinger, 1880
- Scythris tenuivittella Stainton, 1867
- Scythris triguttella Zeller, 1839
- Scythris unimaculella Rebel, 1905
- Scythris vagabundella Herrich-Schäffer, [1854]
- Scythris vittella Costa, [1836]
- Syringopais temperatella Lederer, 1855

== Alucitidae ==
- Alucita cancellata Meyrick, 1908
- Alucita cinnerethella Amsel, 1935
- Alucita cymatodactyla Zeller, 1852
- Alucita grammodactyla Zeller, 1841
- Alucita hexadactyla Linnaeus, 1758
- Alucita huebneri Wallengren, 1859
- Alucita major Rebel, 1905
- Alucita palodactyla Zeller, 1847
- Alucita tridentata Scholz & Jäckh, 1994
- Alucita zonodactyla Zeller, 1847

== Epermeniidae ==
- Epermenia aequidentella Hofmann, 1867
- Epermenia chaerophyllella Goeze, 1776
- Epermenia insecurella Stainton, 1849
- Epermenia ochreomaculella Milliere, 1854
- Epermenia orientalis Gaedike, 1966
- Epermenia pontificella (Hübner, 1796)
- Epermenia strictella Wocke, 1867
- Epermenia wockeella Staudinger, 1880
- Ochromolopis ictella (Hübner, [1813])
- Ochromolopis staintoniella Milliere, 1869
- Phaulernis fulviguttella Zeller, 1839

== Yponomeutidae ==
- Acrolepiopsis vesperella Zeller, 1850
- Atemelia torquatella Lienig & Zeller, 1846
- Digitivalva glaseri Gaedike, 1971
- Digitivalva occidentella Klimesch, 1956
- Digitivalva reticulella (Hübner, 1796)
- Eidophasia messingiella F.R., 1837
- Eidophasia syenitella Herrich-Schäffer, [1851]
- Eidophasia tauricella Staudinger, 1879
- Inuliphila pulicariae Klimesch, 1956
- Inuliphila wolfschlaegeri Klimesch, 1956
- Kessleria caucasica Friese, 1960
- Kessleria impura Staudinger, 1879
- Kessleria osyridella Milliere, 1869
- Niphonympha albella Zeller, 1847
- Paraswammerdamia lutarea Haworth, 1828
- Phrealcia friesei Mey, 2012
- Plutella porrectella (Linnaeus, 1758)
- Plutella xylostella (Linnaeus, 1758)
- Prays fraxinella Bjerkander, 1784
- Prays oleae Bernard, 1788
- Pseudoswammerdamia combinella (Hübner, 1796)
- Rhigognotis senilella Zetterstedt, [1839]
- Theristis mucronella Scopoli, 1763
- Yponomeuta evonymellus (Linnaeus, 1758)
- Yponomeuta irrorellus (Hübner, 1796)
- Yponomeuta padellus (Linnaeus, 1758)
- Yponomeuta plumbella ([Denis & Schiffermüller], 1775)
- Yponomeuta rorrella (Hübner, 1796)
- Ypsolopha albiramella Mann, 1861
- Ypsolopha asperella (Linnaeus, 1761)
- Ypsolopha dentella ([Denis & Schiffermüller], 1775)
- Ypsolopha excisella Lederer, 1855
- Ypsolopha instabilella Mann, 1866
- Ypsolopha kristalleniae Rebel, 1916
- Ypsolopha manniella Staudinger, 1880
- Ypsolopha paranthesella (Linnaeus, 1761)
- Ypsolopha persicella (Fabricius, 1787)
- Ypsolopha sculpturella (Herrich-Schäffer, 1854)
- Ypsolopha semitessella Mann, 1861
- Ypsolopha sequella Clerk, 1759
- Ypsolopha trichoriella Mann, 1861
- Ypsolopha ustella Clerck, 1759
- Ypsolopha vittella (Linnaeus, 1758)
- Zelleria hepariella Stainton, 1849

== Ochsenheimeriidae ==
- Ochsenheimeria taurella ([Denis & Schiffermüller], 1775)

== Lyonetidae ==
- Bedellia somnulentella Zeller, 1847
- Leucoptera malifoliella Costa, 1836
- Lyonetia prunifoliella (Hübner, 1796)

== Glyphipterigidae ==
- Glyphipterix equitella Scopoli, 1763
- Glyphipterix forsterella (Fabricius, 1787)
- Glyphipterix simpliciella Stephens, 1834
- Glyphipterix thrasonella Scopoli, 1763

== Argyresthiidae ==
- Argyresthia abdominalis Zeller, 1839
- Argyresthia conjugella Zeller, 1839
- Argyresthia mendica Haworth, 1828
- Argyresthia pretiosa Staudinger, 1880
- Argyresthia pruniella (Linnaeus, 1761)

== Heliodinidae ==
- Heliodines roesella (Linnaeus, 1758)

== Schreckensteiniidae ==
- Schreckensteinia festaliella (Hübner, [1819])

== Brachodidae ==
- Brachodes anatolicus Kallies, 2001
- Brachodes appendiculata (Esper, [1783])
- Brachodes buxeus Kallies, 2001
- Brachodes candefacta Lederer, 1858
- Brachodes caradjae Rebel, 1902
- Brachodes dispar Herrich-Schäffer, [1854]
- Brachodes orientalis Rebel, 1905
- Brachodes pumila Ochsenheimer, 1808
- Brachodes tristis Staudinger, 1879
- Phycodes chalcocrossa Meyrick, 1909
- Phycodes radiata Ochsenheimer, 1808

== Sesiidae ==
- Bembecia ichneumoniformis ([Denis & Schiffermüller], 1775)
- Bembecia illustris Stgr. & Rebel, 1901
- Bembecia lomatiaeformis Lederer, 1853
- Bembecia pontica Staudinger, 1891
- Bembecia sanguinolenta Lederer, 1853
- Bembecia scopigera Scopoli, 1763
- Bembecia stiziformis Herrich-Schäffer, 1851
- Chamaesphecia albiventris Lederer, 1853
- Chamaesphecia alysoniformis Herrich-Schäffer, 1846
- Chamaesphecia anatolica Schwingenschuss, 1938
- Chamaesphecia annellata Zeller, 1847
- Chamaesphecia aurifera Romanoff, 1885
- Chamaesphecia bibioniformis (Esper, [1800])
- Chamaesphecia chalciformis (Esper, [1804])
- Chamaesphecia colpiformis Staudinger, 1856
- Chamaesphecia doleriformis Herrich-Schäffer, 1846
- Chamaesphecia doryceraeformis Lederer, 1853
- Chamaesphecia elampiformis Herrich-Schäffer, 1851
- Chamaesphecia empiformis (Esper, [1783])
- Chamaesphecia euceraeformis Ochsenheimer, 1816
- Chamaesphecia gorbunovi Spatenka, 1992
- Chamaesphecia haberhaueri Staudinger, 1879
- Chamaesphecia leucopsiformis (Esper, [1800])
- Chamaesphecia masariformis Ochsenheimer, 1808
- Chamaesphecia minor Staudinger, 1856
- Chamaesphecia proximata Staudinger, 1891
- Chamaesphecia regula Staudinger, 1891
- Chamaesphecia schmidtiiformis Freyer, 1836
- Chamaesphecia tahira Kallies & Petersen, 1995
- Chamaesphecia tenthrediniformis ([Denis & Schiffermüller], 1775)
- Euhagena palariformis Lederer, 1858
- Osminia fenusaeformis Herrich-Schäffer, 1852
- Paranthrene insolita Cerf, 1914
- Paranthrene tabaniformis (Rottemburg, 1775)
- Pennisetia hylaeiformis Laspeyres, 1801
- Pyropteron chrysidiforme (Esper, [1782])
- Pyropteron minianiforme Freyer, 1845
- Sesia apiformis (Linnaeus, 1761)
- Sesia bembeciformis (Hübner, [1806])
- Sesia melanocephala Dalman, 1816
- Sesia pimplaeformis Oberthür, 1872
- Synansphecia affinis Staudinger, 1856
- Synansphecia leucomelaena Zeller, 1847
- Synansphecia mannii Lederer, 1853
- Synansphecia muscaeformis (Esper, [1783])
- Synansphecia triannuliformis Freyer, 1845
- Synanthedon andrenaeformis Laspeyres, 1801
- Synanthedon cephiformis Ochsenheimer, 1808
- Synanthedon formicaeformis (Esper, [1783])
- Synanthedon myopaeformis Borkhausen, 1789
- Synanthedon pipiziformis Lederer, 1855
- Synanthedon stomoxiformis (Hübner, 1790)
- Synanthedon tipuliformis Clerck, 1759
- Synanthedon vespiformis (Linnaeus, 1761)
- Tinthia brosiformis (Hübner, [1813])
- Tinthia cingulata Staudinger, 1870
- Tinthia hoplisiformis Mann, 1864
- Tinthia myrmosaeformis Herrich-Schäffer, 1846
- Tinthia tineiformis (Esper, [1789])

== Choreutidae ==
- Anthophila fabriciana (Linnaeus, 1767)
- Choreutis nemorana (Hübner, [1799])
- Choreutis pariana Clerck, 1759
- Millieria dolosana Herrich-Schäffer, [1854]
- Prochoreutis myllerana (Fabricius, 1794)
- Prochoreutis sehestediana (Fabricius, 1777)
- Prochoreutis stellaris Zeller, 1847
- Tebenna bjerkandrella Borgström, 1784

== Cossidae ==
- Arctiocossus striolatus Rothshild, 1912
- Azygophleps regia Staudinger, 1892
- Cecryphalus nubila Staudinger, 1895
- Cossulus argentatus Staudinger, 1887
- Cossulus intractatus Staudinger, 1887
- Cossulus lignosus Brandt, 1938
- Cossus araraticus Teich, 1896
- Cossus cossus (Linnaeus, 1758)
- Cossus funkei Röber, 1896
- Dieida ledereri Staudinger, 1871
- Dyspessa argaeensis Rebel, 1902
- Dyspessa emilia Staudinger, 1878
- Dyspessa hethitica Daniel, 1938
- Dyspessa pallidata Staudinger, 1892
- Dyspessa salicicola Eversmann, 1848
- Dyspessa ulula Borkhausen, 1790
- Dyspessacossus fereidun Grum-Grshimailo, 1895
- Dyspessacossus hadjiensis Daniel, 1953
- Dyspessacossus osthelderi Daniel, 1932
- Holcocerus volgensis Christoph, 1893
- Isoceras bipunctatum Staudinger, 1887
- Isoceras huberi Eitschberger & Ströhle, 1987
- Lamellocossus terebra Denis, 1785
- Paracossulus thrips (Hübner, [1813])
- Parahypopta caestrum (Hübner, [1808])
- Paropta paradoxa Herrich-Schäffer, [1851]
- Phragmacossia albida Erschoff, 1874
- Phragmataecia castaneae (Hübner, 1790)
- Samagystia cuhensis Freina, 1994
- Stygioides colchica Herrich-Schäffer, [1851]
- Stygioides psychidion Staudinger, 1870
- Stygioides tricolor Lederer, 1858
- Zeuzera pyrina (Linnaeus, 1761)

== Zygaenidae ==
- Adscita drenowskii Alberti, 1939
- Adscita geryon Hübner, [1813]
- Adscita mannii Lederer, 1852
- Adscita obscura Zeller, 1847
- Adscita statices (Linnaeus, 1758)
- Adscita storaiae Tarmann, 1977
- Clelea syriaca Hampson, 1919
- Jordanita chloronota Staudinger, 1870
- Jordanita chloros (Hübner, [1813])
- Jordanita globulariae (Hübner, 1793)
- Jordanita graeca Jordan, 1909
- Jordanita syriaca Alberti, 1937
- Jordanita tenuicornis Zeller, 1847
- Lucasiterna subsolana Staudinger, 1862
- Praviela anatolica Naufock, 1929
- Rhagades amasina Herrich-Schäffer, [1851]
- Roccia budensis Speyer & Speyer, 1858
- Roccia hector Jordan, 1909
- Roccia kurdica Tarmann, 1987
- Roccia notata Zeller, 1847
- Roccia staudingeri Alberti, 1954
- Roccia volgensis Möschler, 1862
- Theresimima ampelophaga Bayle, 1809
- Zygaena adscharica Reiss, 1935
- Zygaena araxis Koch, 1936
- Zygaena armena Eversmann, 1851
- Zygaena brizae (Esper, [1800])
- Zygaena cambysea Lederer, 1870
- Zygaena carniolica Scopoli, 1763
- Zygaena cuvieri Boisduval, 1828
- Zygaena cynarae (Esper, [1789])
- Zygaena dorycnii Ochsenheimer, 1808
- Zygaena ephialtes (Linnaeus, 1767)
- Zygaena filipendulae (Linnaeus, 1758)
- Zygaena formosa Herrich-Schäffer, [1852]
- Zygaena fraxini Ménétriés, 1832
- Zygaena graslini Lederer, 1855
- Zygaena haematina Kollar, [1849]
- Zygaena laeta (Hübner, 1790)
- Zygaena laetifica Herrich-Schäffer, [1846]
- Zygaena lonicerae Schewen, 1777
- Zygaena loti ([Denis & Schiffermüller], 1775)
- Zygaena lydia Staudinger, 1887
- Zygaena manlia Lederer, 1870
- Zygaena minos ([Denis & Schiffermüller], 1775)
- Zygaena olivieri Boisduval, 1828
- Zygaena osterodensis Reiss, 1921
- Zygaena peschmerga Eckweiler & Görgner, 1981
- Zygaena problematica Naumann, 1966
- Zygaena punctum Ochsenheimer, 1808
- Zygaena purpuralis Brünnlich, 1763
- Zygaena rosinae Korb, 1902
- Zygaena sedi (Fabricius, 1787)
- Zygaena tamara Christoph, 1889
- Zygaena viciae ([Denis & Schiffermüller], 1775)
- Zygaenoprocris capitalis Staudinger, 1879

== Limacodidae ==
- Apoda limacodes (Hufnagel, 1766)
- Heterogenea cruciata Knoch, 1783
- Hoyosia cretica Rebel, 1906
- Latoia inexpectata Staudinger, 1900

== Tortricidae ==
- Ablabia goiiana (Linnaeus, 1761)
- Acleris boscana (Fabricius, 1794)
- Acleris boscanoides Razowski, 1959
- Acleris fuscana (Fabricius, 1787)
- Acleris literana (Linnaeus, 1758)
- Acleris napaea Meyrick, 1912
- Acleris osthelderi Obraztsov, 1949
- Acleris permutana Duponchel, 1836
- Acleris quercinana Zeller, 1849
- Acleris rhombana ([Denis & Schiffermüller], 1775)
- Acleris scabrana ([Denis & Schiffermüller], 1775)
- Acleris tripunctana (Hübner, 1793)
- Acleris undulana Walsingham, 1900
- Acleris variegana ([Denis & Schiffermüller], 1775)
- Agapeta hamana (Linnaeus, 1758)
- Agapeta zoegana (Linnaeus, 1767)
- Aleimma loeflingiana (Linnaeus, 1758)
- Ancylis achatana ([Denis & Schiffermüller], 1775)
- Ancylis apicella ([Denis & Schiffermüller], 1775)
- Ancylis badiana ([Denis & Schiffermüller], 1775)
- Ancylis comptana Fröhlich, 1828
- Ancylis mitterbacheriana ([Denis & Schiffermüller], 1775)
- Ancylis obtusana Haworth, [1811]
- Ancylis selenana Guenée, 1845
- Ancylis unculana Haworth, [1811]
- Anoplocnephasia orientana Alphéraky, 1876
- Anoplocnephasia sedana Constant, 1884
- Aphelia euxina Djakonov, 1929
- Aphelia ignoratana Staudinger, 1879
- Aphelia insincera Meyrick, 1912
- Aphelia ochreana (Hübner, [1799])
- Aphelia palaeana (Hübner, 1793)
- Aphelia viburniana (Fabricius, 1787)
- Archips crataeganus (Hübner, [1799])
- Archips hebenstreitellus (Müller, 1764)
- Archips podanus Scopoli, 1763
- Archips rosanus (Linnaeus, 1758)
- Archips vulpeculanus Fuchs, 1903
- Archips xylosteanus (Linnaeus, 1758)
- Argyrotaenia pulchellana Haworth, [1811]
- Aspila funebrana Treitschke, 1835
- Aspila janthinana Duponhcel, 1835
- Aterpia anderreggana Guenée, 1845
- Bactra lancealana (Hübner, [1799])
- Bactra robustana Christoph, 1872
- Bactra sp. Stephens, 1834
- Barbara herrichiana Obraztsov, 1960
- Barbara osmana Obraztsov, 1952
- Cacochroea turbidana Treitschke, 1835
- Cacoecimorpha pronubana (Hübner, [1799])
- Capricornia boisduvaliana Duponchel, 1836
- Celypha anatoliana Caradja, 1916
- Celypha cespitana (Hübner, [1817])
- Celypha flavipalpana Herrich-Schäffer, [1851]
- Celypha rurestrana Duponchel, 1843
- Ceratoxanthis argentomixtana Staudinger, 1870
- Choristoneura diversana (Hübner, [1817])
- Cirriphora pharaonana Kollar, 1858
- Clepsis senecionana (Hübner, [1819])
- Cnephasia alternella Stephens, 1852
- Cnephasia anatolica Obraztsov, 1950
- Cnephasia asiatica Kuznetsov, 1956
- Cnephasia bizensis Réal, 1953
- Cnephasia chrysantheana Duponchel, 1843
- Cnephasia communana Herrich-Schäffer, [1851]
- Cnephasia cupressivorana Staudinger, 1871
- Cnephasia facetana Kennel, 1901
- Cnephasia fragosana Zeller, 1847
- Cnephasia helenica Obraztsov, 1950
- Cnephasia heringi Razowski, 1958
- Cnephasia kenneli Obraztsov, 1956
- Cnephasia korvaci Razowski, 1965
- Cnephasia longana Haworth, [1811]
- Cnephasia maraschana Caradja, 1916
- Cnephasia orthoxyana Réal, 1951
- Cnephasia osthelderi Obraztsov, 1950
- Cnephasia pascuana (Hübner, [1799])
- Cnephasia semibrunneata de Joannis, 1891
- Cnephasia syriella Razowski, 1956
- Cnephasia tianshanica Filipjev, 1934
- Cnephasia tristrami Walsingham, 1900
- Cnephasia virgaureana Treitschke, 1835
- Cnephasia virginana Kennel, 1899
- Cnephasiella abrasana Duponchel, 1843
- Cnephasiella incertana Treitschke, 1835
- Cochylidia rupicola Curtis, 1834
- Cochylimorpha alternana Stephens, 1834
- Cochylimorpha armeniana de Joannis, 1891
- Cochylimorpha chamomillana Herrich-Schäff, [1851]
- Cochylimorpha diana Kennel, 1899
- Cochylimorpha discolorana Kennel, 1899
- Cochylimorpha eburneana Kennel, 1899
- Cochylimorpha elongana F.R., 1839
- Cochylimorpha fucosa Razowski, 1970
- Cochylimorpha hilarana Herrich-Schäffer, [1851]
- Cochylimorpha kurdistana Amsel, 1959
- Cochylimorpha langeana Kalchberg, 1897
- Cochylimorpha meridiana Staudinger, 1859
- Cochylimorpha meridiolana Ragonot, 1894
- Cochylimorpha nodulana Möschler, 1862
- Cochylimorpha nomadana Erschoff, 1874
- Cochylimorpha pyramidana Staudinger, 1870
- Cochylimorpha sparsana Staudinger, 1879
- Cochylimorpha wiltshirei Razowski, 1963
- Cochylis defessana Mann, 1861
- Cochylis epilinana Duponchel, 1842
- Cochylis hybridella (Hübner, [1813])
- Cochylis maestana Kennel, 1899
- Cochylis militariana Derra, 1990
- Cochylis nana Haworth, [1811]
- Cochylis pallidana Zeller, 1847
- Cochylis posterana Zeller, 1847
- Cochylis roseana Haworth, [1811]
- Cochylis salebrana Mann, 1862
- Collicularia microgrammana Guenée, 1845
- Commophila bilbaensis Rössler, 1877
- Commophila cremonana Ragonot, 1894
- Commophila deaurana Peyerimhoff, 1877
- Commophila ferruginea Walsingham, 1900
- Commophila flagellana Duponchel, 1836
- Commophila francillana (Fabricius, 1794)
- Commophila hartmanniana Clerck, 1759
- Commophila iranica Razowski, 1963
- Commophila kasyi Razowski, 1962
- Commophila kindermanniana Treitschke, 1830
- Commophila margarotana Duponchel, 1836
- Commophila mauritanica Walsingham, 1898
- Commophila moribundana Staudinger, 1859
- Commophila nefandana Kennel, 1899
- Commophila pannosana Kennel, 1913
- Commophila prangana Kennel, 1900
- Commophila sanguinana Treitschke, 1830
- Commophila smeathmanniana (Fabricius, 1781)
- Commophila speciosa Razowski, 1962
- Commophila tesserana (Hübner, [1817])
- Commophila tornella Walsingham, 1898
- Commophila williana Brahm, 1791
- Crocidosema plebejana Zeller, 1847
- Croesia bergmanniana (Linnaeus, 1758)
- Croesia forsskaleana (Linnaeus, 1758)
- Croesia holmiana (Linnaeus, 1758)
- Cryptocochylis conjunctana Mann, 1864
- Cydia alienana Caradja, 1916
- Cydia conicolana Heylaerts, 1874
- Cydia duplicana Zetterstedt, 1840
- Cydia junctistrigana Walsingham, 1900
- Cydia leucogrammana Hofmann, 1898
- Cydia nigricana (Fabricius, 1794)
- Cydia oxytropidis Martini, 1912
- Cydia pfeifferi Rebel, 1935
- Cydia phalacris Meyrick, 1912
- Cydia pomonella (Linnaeus, 1758)
- Cydia pyrivora Danilevsky, 1947
- Cydia succedana ([Denis & Schiffermüller], 1775)
- Diceratura ostrinana Guenée, 1845
- Diceratura rhodograpta Djakonov, 1929
- Diceratura roseofasciana Mann, 1855
- Dichelia alexiana Kennel, 1919
- Dichrorampha acuminatana Lienig & Zeller, 1846
- Dichrorampha cinerosana Herrich-Schäffer, [1851]
- Dichrorampha coniana Obraztsov, 1953
- Dichrorampha petiverella (Linnaeus, 1758)
- Dichrorampha plumbagana Treitschke, 1830
- Dichrorampha proxima Danilevsky, 1948
- Dichroramphoides agilana Tengström, 1847
- Dichroramphoides gueneeana Obraztsov, 1953
- Endothenia ericetana Humphreys & Westwood, 1854
- Endothenia gentianaeana (Hübner, [1799])
- Endothenia illepidana Kennel, 1901
- Endothenia lapideana Herrich-Schäffer, [1851]
- Endothenia marginana Haworth, [1811]
- Endothenia quadrimaculana Haworth, [1811]
- Epagoge grotiana (Fabricius, 1781)
- Epiblema farfarae T. B. Fletcher, 1938
- Epiblema foenella (Linnaeus, 1758)
- Epiblema gammana Mann, 1866
- Epiblema graphana Treitschke, 1835
- Epiblema hepaticana Treitschke, 1835
- Epiblema junctana Herrich-Schäffer, [1856]
- Epiblema scutulana ([Denis & Schiffermüller], 1775)
- Epinotia abbreviana (Fabricius, 1794)
- Epinotia brunnichana (Linnaeus, 1767)
- Epinotia cruciana (Linnaeus, 1761)
- Epinotia dalmatana Rebel, 1891
- Epinotia deruptana Kennel, 1901
- Epinotia festivana (Hübner, [1799])
- Epinotia kochiana Herrich-Schäffer, [1851]
- Epinotia nigricana Herrich-Schäffer, [1851]
- Epinotia ramella (Linnaeus, 1758)
- Epinotia thapsiana Zeller, 1847
- Eriopsela quadrana (Hübner, [1813])
- Eucelis nigritana Mann, 1862
- Eucosma agnatana Christoph, 1872
- Eucosma albidulana Herrich-Schäffer, [1851]
- Eucosma cana Haworth, [1811]
- Eucosma coagulana Kennel, 1901
- Eucosma conformana Mann, 1872
- Eucosma directa Meyrick, 1912
- Eucosma eremodora Meyrick, 1932
- Eucosma gypsatana Kennel, 1921
- Eucosma hohenwartiana ([Denis & Schiffermüller], 1775)
- Eucosma sparsana Rebel, 1935
- Eucosma umbratana Staudinger, 1879
- Eucosma urbana Kennel, 1901
- Eudemis profundana ([Denis & Schiffermüller], 1775)
- Eugnosta lathoniana (Hübner, [1800])
- Eugnosta magnificana Rebel, 1914
- Eupoecilia ambiguella (Hübner, 1796)
- Eupoecilia angustana (Hübner, [1799])
- Falseuncaria ruficiliana Haworth, [1811]
- Fulvoclysia arguta Razowski, 1968
- Fulvoclysia aulica Razowski, 1968
- Fulvoclysia defectana Lederer, 1870
- Fulvoclysia dictyodana Staudinger, 1879
- Fulvoclysia nerminae Koçak, 1982
- Fulvoclysia pallorana Lederer, 1864
- Fulvoclysia proxima Razowski, 1970
- Fulvoclysia subdolana Kennel, 1901
- Grapholita adjunctana Kennel, 1901
- Grapholita caecana Schläger, 1847
- Grapholita compositella (Fabricius, 1775)
- Grapholita coronillana Lienig & Zeller, 1846
- Grapholita dorsana (Fabricius, 1775)
- Grapholita fissana Fröhlich, 1828
- Grapholita gemmiferana Treitschke, 1835
- Grapholita jungiella (Linnaeus, 1761)
- Grapholita lunulana ([Denis & Schiffermüller], 1775)
- Grapholita nebritana Treitschke, 1830
- Grapholita orobana Treitschke, 1830
- Grapholita pallifrontana Lienig & Zeller, 1846
- Grapholita selenana Zeller, 1847
- Grapholita selliferana Kennel, 1901
- Grapholita sinana Felder, 1874
- Gypsonoma aceriana Duponchel, 1843
- Gypsonoma dealbana Fröhlich, 1828
- Gypsonoma nitidulana Lienig, 1846
- Gypsonoma simulantana Staudinger, 1880
- Hedya nubiferana Haworth, [1811]
- Hedya ochroleucana Fröhlich, 1828
- Hedya pruniana (Hübner, [1799])
- Hedya salicella (Linnaeus, 1758)
- Hedya schreberiana (Linnaeus, 1761)
- Hedya sororiana Herrich-Schäffer, [1851]
- Hysterophora maculosana Haworth, [1811]
- Isotrias hybridana (Hübner, [1817])
- Isotrias rectifasciana Haworth, [1811]
- Kenneliola amplana (Hübner, [1799])
- Kenneliola fagiglandana Zeller, 1841
- Kenneliola inquinatana (Hübner, [1799])
- Kenneliola molybdana Constant, 1884
- Kenneliola splendana (Hübner, [1799])
- Lathronympha strigana (Fabricius, 1775)
- Lipoptycha grueneriana Herrich-Schäffer, [1851]
- Lobesia artemisiana Zeller, 1847
- Lobesia bicinctana Duponchel, 1844
- Lobesia cinerariae Nolcken, 1882
- Lobesia glebifera Meyrick, 1912
- Lobesia littoralis Humphreys & Westwood, 1845
- Lobesia porrectana Zeller, 1847
- Lobesia quaggana Mann, 1855
- Lobesia reliquana (Hübner, [1825])
- Lobesia vitisana Jacquin, 1788
- Lobesiodes euphorbiana Freyer, 1842
- Lobesiodes occidentis Falkovitsh, 1970
- Loxoterma aurofasciana Haworth, [1811]
- Loxoterma lacunana ([Denis & Schiffermüller], 1775)
- Loxoterma rivulana Scopoli, 1763
- Lozotaenia djakonovi Danilevsky, 1963
- Lozotaenia forsterana (Fabricius, 1781)
- Lozotaenia Stephens, 1829
- Lozotaeniodes cupressana Duponchel, 1836
- Neosphaleroptera nubilana Haworth, [1811]
- Notocelia cynosbatella (Linnaeus, 1758)
- Notocelia incarnatana Zincken, 1821
- Notocelia orientana Caradja, 1916
- Notocelia roborana Illiger, 1801
- Notocelia suffusana Duponchel, 1843
- Notocelia uddmanniana (Linnaeus, 1758)
- Olethreutes arcuella (Linnaeus, 1761)
- Olindia schumacherana (Fabricius, 1787)
- Orthotaenia undulana ([Denis & Schiffermüller], 1775)
- Oxypteron impar Staudinger, 1871
- Pammene albuginana Guenée, 1845
- Pammene amygdalana Duponchel, 1843
- Pammene blockiana Herrich-Schäffer, [1851]
- Pammene crataegophila Amsel, 1935
- Pammene fasciana (Linnaeus, 1761)
- Pammene germmana (Hübner, [1799])
- Pammene insulana Guenée, 1845
- Pammene luedersiana Sorhagen, 1885
- Pammene mariana Zerny, 1920
- Pammene ochsenheimeriana Lienig & Zeller, 1846
- Pammene pontica Obraztsov, 1960
- Pammene pullana Kuznetsov, 1986
- Pammene regiana Zeller, 1849
- Pammene rhediella (Linnaeus, 1761)
- Pammene splendidulana Guenée, 1845
- Pammene trauniana ([Denis & Schiffermüller], 1775)
- Paralipoptycha plumbana Scopoli, 1763
- Pelochrista agrestana Treitschke, 1830
- Pelochrista arabescana Eversmann, 1844
- Pelochrista caecimaculana (Hübner, [1799])
- Pelochrista definitana Kennel, 1901
- Pelochrista hepatariana Herrich-Schäffer, [1851]
- Pelochrista infidana (Hübner, [1824])
- Pelochrista medullana Staudinger, 1879
- Pelochrista modicana Zeller, 1847
- Pelochrista praefractana Kennel, 1901
- Pelochrista seriana Kennel, 1901
- Phalonidia acutana Kennel, 1913
- Phalonidia albipalpana Zeller, 1847
- Phalonidia amasiana Ragonot, 1894
- Phalonidia contractana Zeller, 1847
- Phalonidia permixtana ([Denis & Schiffermüller], 1775)
- Phaneta aspidiscana (Hübner, [1817])
- Phaneta paetulana Kennel, 1901
- Phaneta pauperana Duponchel, 1843
- Phaneta tetraplana Möschler, 1866
- Phiaris delitana Staudinger, 1879
- Phiaris stibiana Guenée, 1845
- Phiaris umbrosana Freyer, 1842
- Phtheochroa imitana Derra, 1990
- Phtheochroa larseni Huemer, 1990
- Phtheochroa osthelderi Huemer, 1990
- Phtheochroa schreieri Derra, 1990
- Prochlidonia ochromixtana Kennel, 1913
- Propiromorpha rhodophana Herrich-Schäffer, [1851]
- Pseudamelia rogana Guenée, 1845
- Pseudeulia asinana (Hübner, [1799])
- Pseudococcyx tessulatana Staudinger, 1871
- Pseudosciaphila branderiana (Linnaeus, 1758)
- Ptycholoma lecheana (Linnaeus, 1758)
- Rhopobota myrtillana Humphreys & Westwood, 1845
- Rhopobota stagnana ([Denis & Schiffermüller], 1775)
- Rhyacionia buoliana ([Denis & Schiffermüller], 1775)
- Rhyacionia pinicolana Doubleday, 1850
- Selania leplastriana Curtis, 1831
- Siclobola micromys Stringer, 1929
- Siclobola neglectana Herrich-Schäffer, [1851]
- Siclobola pallidana (Fabricius, 1777)
- Siclobola semialbana Guenée, 1845
- Siclobola unifasciana Duponchel, 1843
- Sparganothis pilleriana ([Denis & Schiffermüller], 1775)
- Spilonota ocellana ([Denis & Schiffermüller], 1775)
- Strophedra nitidana (Fabricius, 1794)
- Strophedra weirana Douglas, 1850
- Syndemis musculana (Hübner, [1799])
- Thiodia anatoliana Kennel, 1916
- Thiodia citrana (Hübner, [1799])
- Thiodia fessana Mann, 1873
- Tortricodes selma Koçak, 1991
- Tortrix viridana Linnaeus, 1758
- Trachysmia aureopunctana Ragonot, 1894
- Trachysmia chalcantha Meyrick, 1912
- Trachysmia decipiens Walsingham, 1900
- Trachysmia duponchelana Duponchel, 1843
- Trachysmia lucentana Kennel, 1899
- Trachysmia palpana Ragonot, 1894
- Trachysmia procerana Lederer, 1863
- Trachysmia purana Guenée, 1846
- Trachysmia thiana Staudinger, 1899
- Trachysmia unionana Kennel, 1900

== Pterophoridae ==
- Adaina microdactyla (Hübner, [1813])
- Agdistis adactyla (Hübner, [1819])
- Agdistis caradjai Arenberger, 1975
- Agdistis frankeniae Zeller, 1847
- Agdistis heydeni Zeller, 1852
- Agdistis mevlaniella Arenberger, 1972
- Agdistis tamaricis Zeller, 1847
- Amblyptilia acanthodactyla (Hübner, [1813])
- Anacapperia fusca Hofmann, 1898
- Anacapperia hellenica Adamczewski, 1951
- Calyciphora homoiodactyla Kasy, 1960
- Calyciphora nephelodactyla Eversmann, 1844
- Calyciphora xanthodactyla Treitschke, 1833
- Calyciphora xerodactyla Zeller, 1841
- Capperia britanniodactyla Gregson, 1869
- Capperia celeusi Frey, 1886
- Capperia polonica Adamczewski, 1951
- Capperia washbourni Adamczewski, 1951
- Cnaemidophorus rhododactylus (Fabricius, 1787)
- Emmelina monodactyla (Linnaeus, 1758)
- Geina didactyla (Linnaeus, 1758)
- Marasmarcha ehrenbergiana Zeller, 1841
- Merrifieldia baliodactyla Zeller, 1841
- Merrifieldia leucodactyla ([Denis & Schiffermüller], 1775)
- Merrifieldia tridactyla (Linnaeus, 1758)
- Oidematophorus lithodactylus Treitschke, 1833
- Oxyptilus chrysodactylus ([Denis & Schiffermüller], 1775)
- Oxyptilus distans Zeller, 1847
- Oxyptilus ericetorum Stainton, 1851
- Oxyptilus kollari Stainton, 1849
- Oxyptilus marginellus Zeller, 1847
- Oxyptilus parvidactylus Haworth, [1811]
- Oxyptilus pilosellae Zeller, 1841
- Oxyptilus propedistans Bigot & Picard, 1988
- Paracapperia anatolica Caradja, 1920
- Paraplatyptilia metzneri Zeller, 1841
- Platyptilia calodactyla ([Denis & Schiffermüller], 1775)
- Platyptilia capnodactyla Zeller, 1841
- Platyptilia chondrodactyla Caradja, 1920
- Platyptilia gonodactyla ([Denis & Schiffermüller], 1775)
- Porittia galactodactyla ([Denis & Schiffermüller], 1775)
- Procapperia maculata Constant, 1865
- Pselnophorus borzhomi Zagulyaev, 1987
- Pselnophorus heterodactylus (Müller, 1764)
- Pterophorus calcarius Lederer, 1870
- Pterophorus caspius Lederer, 1870
- Pterophorus ivae Kasy, 1960
- Pterophorus malacodactylus Zeller, 1847
- Pterophorus pentadactylus (Linnaeus, 1758)
- Pterophorus phlomidis Staudinger, 1870
- Pterophorus subalternans Lederer, 1869
- Stenoptilia bipunctidactyla Scopoli, 1763
- Stenoptilia mannii Zeller, 1852
- Stenoptilia pterodactyla (Linnaeus, 1761)
- Stenoptilia stigmatodactyla Zeller, 1852
- Stenoptilia zophodactyla Duponchel, 1838
- Tabulaephorus parthicus Lederer, 1870
- Tabulaephorus punctinervis Constant, 1885
- Trichoptilus siceliota Zeller, 1847
- Wheeleria spilodactyla Curtis, 1827

== Carposinidae ==
- Carposina berberidella Herrich-Schäffer, [1854]
- Carposina scirrhosella Herrich-Schäffer, [1854]

== Pyralidae ==
- Abrephia compositella Treitschke, 1835
- Acentria nivea Olivier, 1791
- Achroia grisella (Fabricius, 1794)
- Achyra nudalis (Hübner, 1796)
- Acigona cicatricella (Hübner, [1824])
- Acrobasis atrisquamella Ragonot, 1887
- Acrobasis bithynella Zeller, 1848
- Acrobasis centunculella Mann, 1859
- Acrobasis consociella (Hübner, [1813])
- Acrobasis glaucella Staudinger, 1859
- Acrobasis obliqua Zeller, 1847
- Acrobasis obtusella (Hübner, 1796)
- Actenia beatalis Kalchberg, 1897
- Actenia brunnealis Treitschke, 1829
- Actenia honestalis Treitschke, 1829
- Aeschremon disparalis Herrich-Schäffer, [1855]
- Aglossa asiatica Erschoff, 1872
- Aglossa caprealis (Hübner, [1809])
- Aglossa pinguinalis (Linnaeus, 1758)
- Agriphila asiatica Ganev & Hacker, 1984
- Agriphila beieri Błeszyński, 1955
- Agriphila bleszynskiella Amsel, 1961
- Agriphila brionellus Zerny, 1914
- Agriphila deliella (Hübner, [1813])
- Agriphila geniculea Haworth, [1811]
- Agriphila inquinatella ([Denis & Schiffermüller], 1775)
- Agriphila latistria Haworth, [1811]
- Agriphila paleatella Zeller, 1847
- Agriphila straminella ([Denis & Schiffermüller], 1775)
- Agriphila tersella Lederer, 1855
- Agriphila tolli Błeszyński, 1952
- Agriphila trabeatella Herrich-Schäffer, [1848]
- Agriphila tristella ([Denis & Schiffermüller], 1775)
- Agriphiloides longipalpellus Bleszynki, 1965
- Agrotera nemoralis Scopoli, 1763
- Alisa amseli Ganev & Hacker, 1984
- Alophia combustella Herrich-Schäffer, [1855]
- Amaurophanes stigmosalis Herrich-Schäffer, [1848]
- Anagasta cypriusella Roesler, 1965
- Anagasta kuehniella Zeller, 1879
- Anagasta welseriella Zeller, 1848
- Anania funebris Ström, 1768
- Anania verbascata (Fabricius, 1787)
- Anarpia incertalis Duponchel, 1833
- Ancylodes pallens Ragonot, 1887
- Ancylodes straminella Christoph, 1877
- Ancylolomia palpella ([Denis & Schiffermüller], 1775)
- Ancylolomia pectinatellus Zeller, 1847
- Ancylolomia tentaculella (Hübner, 1796)
- Ancylosis bichordella Ragonot, 1887
- Ancylosis cinnamomella Duponchel, 1836
- Ancylosis dumetella Ragonot, 1887
- Ancylosis iranella Ragonot, 1887
- Ancylosis maculifera Staudinger, 1870
- Ancylosis ochricostella Ragonot, 1887
- Ancylosis sareptalla Herrich-Schäffer, 1860
- Ancylosis turaniella Ragonot, 1887
- Anerastia ablutella Zeller, 1839
- Anerastia lotella (Hübner, [1813])
- Angustalius malacellus Duponchel, 1836
- Anhomoeosoma nimbellum Duponchel, 1836
- Antigastra catalaunalis Duponchel, 1833
- Aphomia sociella (Linnaeus, 1758)
- Aporodes floralis (Hübner, [1809])
- Aporodes nepticulalis Hofmann, [1898]
- Aproceratia albunculella Staudinger, 1879
- Arimania komaroffi Ragonot, 1888
- Arsissa divaricella Ragonot, 1887
- Arsissa miridella Ragonot, 1893
- Arsissa ramosella Herrich-Schäffer, [1855]
- Asalebria venustella Ragonot, 1887
- Asarta ciliciella Staudinger, 1879
- Assara turciella Roesler, 1973
- Atralata albofascialis Treitschke, 1829
- Bazaria gilvella Ragonot, 1887
- Bazaria leuchochrella Herrich-Schäffer, [1855]
- Bazaria turensis Ragonot, 1887
- Bradyrrhoa cantenerella Duponchel, 1836
- Bradyrrhoa confiniella Zeller, 1848
- Bradyrrhoa gilveolella Treitschke, 1833
- Bradyrrhoa mesobaphella Ragonot, 1888
- Bradyrrhoa trapezella Duponchel, 1836
- Cabotia lacteicostella Ragonot, 1887
- Cabotia oblitella Zeller, 1848
- Cadra abstersella Zeller, 1847
- Cadra calidella Guenée, 1845
- Cadra cautella Walker, 1863
- Cadra delattinella Roesler, 1965
- Cadra figulilella Gregson, 1871
- Cadra furcatella Herrich-Schäffer, [1849]
- Calamotropha hierichuntica Zeller, 1867
- Calamotropha paludella (Hübner, [1824])
- Cataclysta lemnata (Linnaeus, 1758)
- Cataonia erubescens Christoph, 1877
- Cataonia mauritanica Amsel, 1953
- Catastia acraspedella Staudinger, 1879
- Catastia marginea ([Denis & Schiffermüller], 1775)
- Catoptria ciliciella Rebel, 1903
- Catoptria colchicellus Lederer, 1870
- Catoptria confusella Staudinger, 1881
- Catoptria dimorphella Staudinger, 1881
- Catoptria falsella ([Denis & Schiffermüller], 1775)
- Catoptria hilarellus Caradja, 1925
- Catoptria incertella Herrich-Schäffer, [1852]
- Catoptria laevigatella Lederer, 1870
- Catoptria lythargyrella (Hübner, 1796)
- Catoptria mytilella (Hübner, [1805])
- Catoptria pinella (Linnaeus, 1758)
- Catoptria verellus Zincken, 1817
- Catoptria wolfi Ganev & Hacker, 1984
- Chilo luteellus Motschulsky, 1866
- Chilo phragmitellus (Hübner, [1810])
- Chilo pulverosellus Ragonot, 1895
- Chrysocrambus craterellus Scopoli, 1763
- Chrysocrambus linetellus (Fabricius, 1781)
- Chrysocrambus syriellus Zerny, 1934
- Chrysoteuchia culmella (Linnaeus, 1758)
- Conobathra celticola Staudinger, 1879
- Conobathra tumidana ([Denis & Schiffermüller], 1775)
- Corcyra cephalonica Stainton, 1866
- Crambus lathoniellus Zincken, 1817
- Crambus monochromellus Herrich-Schäffer, [1852]
- Crambus pascuellus (Linnaeus, 1758)
- Crambus perlellus Scopoli, 1763
- Crambus pratellus (Linnaeus, 1758)
- Crambus uliginosellus Zeller, 1850
- Cryptoblabes gnidiella Milliere, 1867
- Cybalomia lutosalis Mann, 1862
- Cybalomia pentadalis Lederer, 1855
- Cynaeda dentalis ([Denis & Schiffermüller], 1775)
- Cynaeda gigantea Staudinger, 1880
- Dattinia colchicalis Herrich-Schäffer, [1855]
- Dattinia infulalis Lederer, 1858
- Dattinia variabilis Zerny, 1930
- Denticera divisella Duponchel, 1842
- Diasemia litterata Scopoli, 1763
- Diasemiopsis ramburialis Duponchel, 1834
- Dioryctria abietella (Fabricius, 1787)
- Dioryctria mendacella Staudinger, 1859
- Dioryctria sylvestrella Ratzeburg, 1840
- Dolicharthria punctalis ([Denis & Schiffermüller], 1775)
- Donacaula mucronella ([Denis & Schiffermüller], 1775)
- Duponchelia fovealis Zeller, 1847
- Ebulea crocealis (Hübner, 1796)
- Ebulea testacealis Zeller, 1847
- Ecbatania holopyrrhella Ragonot, 1888
- Eccopisa effractella Zeller, 1848
- Ectomyelois ceratoniae Zeller, 1839
- Elegia fallax Staudinger, 1881
- Elophila affinialis Guenée, 1854
- Elophila hederalis Amsel, 1935
- Elophila nymphaeata (Linnaeus, 1758)
- Ematheudes pseudopunctella Ragonot, 1888
- Ematheudes punctella Treitschke, 1833
- Ematheudes varicella Ragonot, 1887
- Ematheudes vitellinella Ragonot, 1887
- Emprepes vestalis Hampson, 1900
- Endotricha flammealis ([Denis & Schiffermüller], 1775)
- Epactoctena octogenalis Lederer, 1863
- Epascestria peltaloides Rebel, 1932
- Epascestria pustulalis (Hübner, [1823])
- Ephelis cruentalis Geyer, 1832
- Ephestia disparella Ragonot, 1901
- Ephestia elutella (Hübner, 1796)
- Epichalcia amasiella Roesler, 1969
- Epidauria discella Hampson, 1901
- Epidauria phoeniciella Ragonot, 1895
- Epidauria strigosa Staudinger, 1879
- Epidauria transversariella Zeller, 1848
- Epiepischnia pseudolydella Amsel, 1953
- Epilydia liturosella Erschoff, 1874
- Epimetasia vestalis Ragonot, 1894
- Epischidia caesariella Ragonot, 1901
- Epischnia christophori Ragonot, 1887
- Epischnia cretaciella Mann, 1969
- Epischnia leucoloma Herrich-Schäffer, 1849
- Epischnia leucomixtella Ragonot, 1887
- Epischnia muscidella Ragonot, 1887
- Epischnia prodromella (Hübner, [1799])
- Epischnia stenopterella Rebel, 1910
- Episcythrastis tetricella ([Denis & Schiffermüller], 1775)
- Etiella zinckenella Treitschke, 1832
- Eucarphia vinetella (Fabricius, 1787)
- Euchromius anapiellus Zeller, 1847
- Euchromius bella (Hübner, 1796)
- Euchromius bleszynskiellus Popescu-Gorj, 1964
- Euchromius cochlearellus Amsel, 1949
- Euchromius gratiosellus Caradja, 1910
- Euchromius jaxartellus Erschoff, 1874
- Euchromius keredjellus Amsel, 1949
- Euchromius ocelleus Haworth, [1811]
- Euchromius pulverosus Christoph, 1887
- Euchromius rayatellus Amsel, 1949
- Euchromius siuxellus Ganev & Hacker, 1986
- Euchromius superbellus Zeller, 1849
- Euchromius vinculellus Zeller, 1847
- Euclasta splendidalis Herrich-Schäffer, [1848]
- Eudonia angustea Curtis, 1827
- Eudonia crataegella (Hübner, 1796)
- Eudonia lineola Curtis, 1827
- Eudonia mercurella (Linnaeus, 1758)
- Eudonia obsoleta Staudinger, 1879
- Eudonia polyphaealis Hampson, 1907
- Eudonia truncicolella Stainton, 1849
- Eurhobasis lutescentella Caradja, 1916
- Eurhodope incompta Zeller, 1847
- Eurhodope monogrammos Zeller, 1867
- Eurhodope rosella Scopoli, 1763
- Eurhodope sielmannella Roesler, 1969
- Eurrhypara hortulata (Linnaeus, 1758)
- Eurrhypis cacuminalis Eversmann, 1843
- Eurrhypis pollinalis ([Denis & Schiffermüller], 1775)
- Eurrhypis sartalis (Hübner, [1813])
- Euzophera bigella Zeller, 1848
- Euzophera cinerosella Zeller, 1839
- Euzophera flagella Lederer, 1869
- Euzophera imperfectella Ragonot, 1895
- Euzophera luculentella Ragonot, 1888
- Euzophera lunulella Costa, 1836
- Euzophera osseatella Treitschke, 1832
- Euzophera pinguis Haworth, [1811]
- Euzophera pulchella Ragonot, 1887
- Euzophera rubricetella Herrich-Schäffer, [1856]
- Euzophera umbrosella Staudinger, 1879
- Euzopherodes charlottae Rebel, 1914
- Euzopherodes lutisignella Mann, 1869
- Euzopherodes vapidella Mann, 1857
- Evergestis aenealis ([Denis & Schiffermüller], 1775)
- Evergestis blandalis Guenée, 1854
- Evergestis boursini Amsel, 1938
- Evergestis caesialis Herrich-Schäffer, [1855]
- Evergestis desertalis (Hübner, [1813])
- Evergestis extimalis Scopoli, 1763
- Evergestis forficalis (Linnaeus, 1758)
- Evergestis frumentalis (Linnaeus, 1761)
- Evergestis infirmalis Staudinger, 1870
- Evergestis isatidalis Duponchel, 1833
- Evergestis limbata (Linnaeus, 1767)
- Evergestis mundalis Guenée, 1854
- Evergestis nomadalis Lederer, 1871
- Evergestis pallidata (Hufnagel, 1767)
- Evergestis politalis ([Denis & Schiffermüller], 1775)
- Evergestis serratalis Staudinger, 1870
- Evergestis sophialis (Fabricius, 1787)
- Evergestis subfuscalis Staudinger, 1870
- Evergestis umbrosalis F.R., [1842]
- Exophora exaspersata Staudinger, 1879
- Exophora florella Mann, 1862
- Faveria dionysia Zeller, 1846
- Galleria mellonella (Linnaeus, 1758)
- Gesneria centuriella ([Denis & Schiffermüller], 1775)
- Gnathogutta circumdatella Lederer, 1858
- Gnathogutta luticornella Ragonot, 1887
- Gnathogutta osseella Ragonot, 1887
- Gnathogutta pluripunctella Ragonot, 1887
- Gnathogutta pumicosa Lederer, 1855
- Gnathogutta umbratella Treitschke, 1835
- Gymnancyla canella ([Denis & Schiffermüller], 1775)
- Hannemanneia tacapella Ragonot, 1887
- Harpadispar diffusalis Guenée, 1854
- Heliothela wulfeniana Scopoli, 1763
- Hellula undalis (Fabricius, 1781)
- Heosphora ramulosella Ragonot, 1895
- Heterographis albicosta Staudinger, 1870
- Heterographis candidatella Lederer, 1858
- Heterographis cinerella Stainton, 1859
- Heterographis faustinella Zeller, 1867
- Heterographis geminella Amsel, 1961
- Heterographis gracilella Ragonot, 1887
- Heterographis harmoniella Ragonot, 1887
- Heterographis hellenica Staudinger, 1870
- Heterographis muliebris Meyrick, 1937
- Heterographis nigripunctella Staudinger, 1879
- Heterographis nubeculella Ragonot, 1887
- Heterographis pallida Staudinger, 1870
- Heterographis pectinatella Ragonot, 1887
- Heterographis pyrethrella Herrich-Schäffer, 1860
- Heterographis rhodochrella Herrich-Schäffer, 1852
- Heterographis samaritanella Zeller, 1867
- Heterographis xylinella Staudinger, 1870
- Homoeosoma achroeellum Ragonot, 1887
- Homoeosoma calcellum Ragonot, 1887
- Homoeosoma inustellum Ragonot, 1884
- Homoeosoma sinuellum (Fabricius, 1794)
- Homoeosoma subalbatellum Mann, 1864
- Hydriris ornatalis Duponchel, 1834
- Hymenia fascialis Cramer, [1782]
- Hyperlais dulcinalis Treitschke, 1835
- Hyperlais nemausalis Duponchel, 1834
- Hyperlais siccalis Guenée, 1854
- Hypochalcia ahenella ([Denis & Schiffermüller], 1775)
- Hypochalcia fasciatella Staudinger, 1881
- Hypochalcia germanella Zincken, 1818
- Hypotia corticalis ([Denis & Schiffermüller], 1775)
- Hypsopygia costalis (Fabricius, 1775)
- Hypsotropa ichorella Lederer, 1855
- Hypsotropa limbella Zeller, 1848
- Hypsotropa paucipunctella Ragonot, 1895
- Hypsotropa syriacella Ragonot, 1888
- Hypsotropa vulneratella Zeller, 1847
- Isauria dilucidella Duponchel, 1836
- Keradere lepidella Ragonot, 1887
- Keradere noctivaga Staudinger, 1879
- Lambaesia fumosella Ragonot, 1887
- Lambaesia pistrinariella Ragonot, 1887
- Lambaesia straminella Zerny, 1914
- Lamoria anella ([Denis & Schiffermüller], 1775)
- Lamoria ruficostella Ragonot, 1888
- Loxostege aeruginalis (Hübner, 1796)
- Loxostege comptalis Freyer, [1848]
- Loxostege deliblatica Szent-Ivany & Uhrik-Meszaros, 1942
- Loxostege flavivenalis Hampson, 1913
- Loxostege mucosalis Herrich-Schäffer, [1848]
- Loxostege straminealis Hampson, 1900
- Loxostege turbidalis Treitschke, 1829
- Loxostege wagneri Zerny, 1929
- Mardinia ferrealis Hampson, 1900
- Margaritia sticticalis (Linnaeus, 1761)
- Mecyna amasialis Staudinger, 1880
- Mecyna asinalis (Hübner, [1819])
- Mecyna flavalis ([Denis & Schiffermüller], 1775)
- Mecyna lutealis Duponchel, 1833
- Mecyna lutulentalis Lederer, 1858
- Mecyna pontica Staudinger, 1880
- Mecyna trinalis ([Denis & Schiffermüller], 1775)
- Megasis libanoticella Zerny, 1934
- Megasis mimeticella Staudinger, 1879
- Megasis rippertella Zeller, 1839
- Melissoblaptes unicolor Staudinger, 1879
- Melissoblaptes zelleri de Joannis, 1932
- Merulempista cingillella Zeller, 1846
- Mesocrambus candiellus Herrich-Schäffer, [1848]
- Metacrambus carectellus Zeller, 1847
- Metallosticha argyrogrammos Zeller, 1847
- Metallostichodes nigrocyanella Constant, 1865
- Metallostichodes vinaceella Ragonot, 1895
- Metasia carnealis Treitschke, 1829
- Metasia inustalis Ragonot, 1894
- Metasia mendicalis Staudinger, 1880
- Metasia ophialis Treitschke, 1829
- Metasia rosealis Ragonot, 1895
- Metasia subtilialis Caradja, 1916
- Metasia suppandalis (Hübner, [1823])
- Metasia virginalis Ragonot, 1894
- Microstega hyalinalis (Hübner, 1796)
- Microstega pandalis (Hübner, [1825])
- Microstega praepetalis Lederer, 1869
- Mutuuraia terrealis Treitschke, 1829
- Myelois circumvoluta Geoffroy, 1785
- Myelois cribratella Zeller, 1847
- Myelois fuscicostella Mann, 1861
- Myelois multiflorella Ragonot, 1893
- Myelois quadripunctella Zerny, 1914
- Myelopsis tabidella Mann, 1864
- Myrlaea albistrigata Staudinger, 1881
- Myrlaea epischniella Staudinger, 1879
- Nascia cilialis (Hübner, 1796)
- Neocrambus wolfschlaegeri Schawerda, 1937
- Nephopteryx alpigenella Duponchel, 1836
- Nephopteryx gregella Eversmann, 1844
- Nephopteryx hostilis Stephens, 1834
- Nephopteryx impariella Ragonot, 1887
- Nephopteryx insignella Mann, 1862
- Nephopteryx melanotaeniella Ragonot, 1888
- Nephopteryx rhenella Zincken, 1818
- Nephopteryx serraticornella Zeller, 1839
- Noctuelia escherichi Hofmann, [1898]
- Noctuelia mardinalis Staudinger, 1892
- Noctuelia superba Freyer, [1844]
- Noctuelia vespertalis Herrich-Schäffer, [1855]
- Nomophila noctuella ([Denis & Schiffermüller], 1775)
- Nyctegretis achatinella (Hübner, [1824])
- Nyctegretis ruminella Harpe, 1860
- Nyctegretis triangulella Ragonot, 1901
- Nymphula stagnata Donovan, 1806
- Nymphula stratiotata (Linnaeus, 1758)
- Oncocera combustella Herrich-Schäffer, [1852]
- Opsibotys fuscalis ([Denis & Schiffermüller], 1775)
- Orenaia alborivulalis Eversmann, 1844
- Orthopygia almanalis Rebel, 1917
- Orthopygia fulvocilialis Duponchel, 1832
- Orthopygia glaucinalis (Linnaeus, 1758)
- Orthopygia incarnatalis Zeller, 1847
- Orthopygia rubidalis ([Denis & Schiffermüller], 1775)
- Ostrinia nubilalis (Hübner, 1796)
- Palmitia massilialis Duponchel, 1832
- Palpita unionalis (Hübner, 1796)
- Panstegia aerealis (Hübner, 1796)
- Panstegia limbopunctalis Herrich-Schäffer, [1849]
- Panstegia meciti Koçak, 1987
- Paracorsia repandalis ([Denis & Schiffermüller], 1775)
- Paralipsa gularis Zeller, 1877
- Paramaxillaria meretrix Staudinger, 1879
- Parastenia bruguieralis Duponchel, 1833
- Paratalanta cultralis Staudinger, 1867
- Pareromene euchromiella Ragonot, 1895
- Pediasia aridella Thunberg, 1788
- Pediasia aridelloides Bleszynki, 1965
- Pediasia contaminella (Hübner, 1796)
- Pediasia desertella Lederer, 1855
- Pediasia fascelinella (Hübner, [1813])
- Pediasia luteella ([Denis & Schiffermüller], 1775)
- Pediasia matricella Treitschke, 1832
- Pediasia persella Toll, 1947
- Pediasia phrygius Fazekas, 1990
- Pempelia albariella Zeller, 1846
- Pempelia amoenella Zeller, 1848
- Pempelia argillaceella Osthelder, 1935
- Pempelia brephiella Staudinger, 1879
- Pempelia cirtensis Ragonot, 1890
- Pempelia formosa Haworth, [1811]
- Pempelia johannella (Caradja, 1916)
- Pempelia obductella Zeller, 1839
- Pempelia obscurella Osthelder, 1935
- Pempelia palumbella ([Denis & Schiffermüller], 1775)
- Pempelia placidella Zerny, 1929
- Pempelia romanoffiella Ragonot, 1887
- Pempelia serratella Ragonot, 1893
- Pempelia sordida Staudinger, 1879
- Pempelia thymiella Zeller, 1846
- Pempeliella ornatella ([Denis & Schiffermüller], 1775)
- Pempeliella sororiella Zeller, 1839
- Phlyctaenia coronata (Hufnagel, 1767)
- Phlyctaenia perlucidalis (Hübner, [1809])
- Phlyctaenomorpha sinuosalis Cerf, 1910
- Phycita coronatella Guenée, 1845
- Phycita kurdistanella Amsel, 1953
- Phycita macrodontella Ragonot, 1887
- Phycita meliella Mann, 1864
- Phycita metzneri Zeller, 1846
- Phycita pedisignella Ragonot, 1887
- Phycita poteriella Zeller, 1846
- Phycita strigata Staudinger, 1879
- Phycitodes albatella Ragonot, 1887
- Phycitodes binaevella (Hübner, [1813])
- Phycitodes carlinella Heinemann, 1865
- Phycitodes inquinatella Ragonot, 1887
- Phycitodes lacteella Rothschild, 1915
- Phycitodes nigrilimbella Ragonot, 1887
- Phycitodes saxicola Vaugham, 1870
- Pima boisduvaliella Guenée, 1845
- Platytes cerussella ([Denis & Schiffermüller], 1775)
- Pleuroptya balteata (Fabricius, 1798)
- Pleuroptya ruralis Scopoli, 1763
- Plodia interpunctella (Hübner, [1813])
- Pollichia semirubella Scopoli, 1763
- Polyocha cremoricosta Ragonot, 1895
- Polyocha venosa Zeller, 1847
- Praeepischnia lydella Lederer, 1865
- Pristocerella solskyi Christoph, 1877
- Prochoristis rupicapralis Lederer, 1855
- Prophtasia platycerella Ragonot, 1887
- Psammotis pulveralis (Hübner, 1796)
- Psorosa albunculella Ragonot, 1901
- Psorosa dahliella Treitschke, 1832
- Psorosa maraschella Caradja, 1910
- Psorosa nucleolella Möschler, 1866
- Psorosa ochrifasciella Ragonot, 1887
- Pterothrixidia ancyrensis Amsel, 1953
- Pterothrixidia contectella Zeller, 1848
- Pterothrixidia fimbriatella Zeller, 1848
- Pterothrixidia impurella Duponchel, 1836
- Pterothrixidia orientella Ragonot, 1893
- Pterothrixidia rufella Duponchel, 1836
- Pterothrixidia tauricella Wocke, 1871
- Pyla fusca Haworth, [1811]
- Pyralis farinalis Linnaeus, 1758
- Pyralis imperialis Caradja, 1916
- Pyralis perversalis Herrich-Schäffer, 1849
- Pyralis regalis ([Denis & Schiffermüller], 1775)
- Pyrasia gutturalis Staudinger, 1880
- Pyrausta alborivularis Eversmann, 1843
- Pyrausta amatalis Rebel, 1903
- Pyrausta aurata Scopoli, 1763
- Pyrausta biternalis Mann, 1862
- Pyrausta castalis Treitschke, 1829
- Pyrausta cingulata (Linnaeus, 1758)
- Pyrausta cuprinalis Ragonot, 1895
- Pyrausta despicata Scopoli, 1763
- Pyrausta falcatalis Guenée, 1854
- Pyrausta nigrata Scopoli, 1763
- Pyrausta obfuscata Scopoli, 1763
- Pyrausta pachyceralis Hampson, 1900
- Pyrausta pauperalis Staudinger, 1880
- Pyrausta pavidalis Zerny, 1935
- Pyrausta purpuralis (Linnaeus, 1758)
- Pyrausta sanguinalis (Linnaeus, 1767)
- Pyrausta trimaculalis Staudinger, 1867
- Pyrausta virginalis Duponchel, 1833
- Pyrausta zeitunalis Caradja, 1916
- Saluria chehirella Zerny, 1929
- Saluria maculivittella Ragonot, 1887
- Schoenobius alpherakyi Staudinger, 1874
- Schoenobius forficella Thunberg, 1794
- Schoenobius gigantellus ([Denis & Schiffermüller], 1775)
- Schoenobius niloticus Zeller, 1867
- Scirpophaga praelata Scopoli, 1763
- Sclerocona acutellus Eversmann, 1842
- Scoparia ambigualis Treitschke, 1829
- Scoparia anatolica Caradja, 1917
- Scoparia basistrigalis Knaggs, 1866
- Scoparia ingratella Zeller, 1846
- Scoparia luteolalis Scopoli, 1772
- Scoparia perplexella Zeller, 1839
- Scoparia pyralea Haworth, [1811]
- Sefidia clasperella Asselbergs, 1994
- Selagia dissimilella Ragonot, 1887
- Selagia spadicella (Hübner, 1796)
- Selagia subochrella (Herrich-Schäffer, 1849)
- Sitochroa concoloralis Lederer, 1857
- Sitochroa palealis ([Denis & Schiffermüller], 1775)
- Sitochroa verticalis (Linnaeus, 1758)
- Spermatophthora hornigii Lederer, 1852
- Staudingeria deserticola Staudinger, 1870
- Staudingeria morbosella Staudinger, 1879
- Stemmatophora caesarealis Ragonot, 1891
- Stemmatophora combustalis F.R., [1842]
- Stemmatophora subustalis Lederer, 1853
- Stiphrometasia sancta Hampson, 1900
- Sultania lophotalis Hampson, 1900
- Surattha margherita Bleszynki, 1965
- Susia uberalis Swinhoe, 1884
- Synaphe armenialis Lederer, 1870
- Synaphe asiatica Obraztsov, 1952
- Synaphe berytalis Ragonot, 1888
- Synaphe bombycalis ([Denis & Schiffermüller], 1775)
- Synaphe connectalis (Hübner, 1796)
- Synaphe consecretalis Lederer, 1855
- Synaphe moldavica (Esper, [1789])
- Synaphe morbidalis Guenée, 1854
- Synaphe punctalis (Fabricius, 1775)
- Synaphe syriaca Rebel, 1903
- Synaphe uxorialis Lederer, 1858
- Synclera traducalis Zeller, 1852
- Synoria antiquella Herrich-Schäffer, [1855]
- Syrianarpia osthelderi Leraut, 1982
- Talis quercella ([Denis & Schiffermüller], 1775)
- Talis renetae Ganev & Hacker, 1984
- Tegostoma baphialis Lederer, 1868
- Tegostoma comparalis (Hübner, 1796)
- Tegostoma perlepidalis Guenée, 1854
- Tegostoma ramalis (Hübner, 1796)
- Therapne obsoletalis Mann, 1864
- Thisanotia chrysonuchella Scopoli, 1763
- Thopeutis galleriellus Ragonot, 1892
- Thyridiphora furia Swinhoe, 1884
- Titanio normalis (Hübner, 1796)
- Titanio sericatalis Herrich-Schäffer, [1848]
- Titanio venustalis Lederer, 1855
- Trachycera advenella Zincken, 1818
- Trachycera dulcella Zeller, 1848
- Trachycera legatea Haworth, [1811]
- Trachycera marmorea Haworth, [1811]
- Trachycera niveicinctella Ragonot, 1887
- Trachycera suavella Zincken, 1818
- Tragonitis cristella (Hübner, 1796)
- Tretopteryx pertusalis Geyer, [1832]
- Udea albescenstalis Hampson, 1900
- Udea dispunctalis Guenée, 1854
- Udea ferrugalis (Hübner, 1796)
- Udea fimbriatralis Duponchel, 1834
- Udea fulvalis (Hübner, [1809])
- Udea institalis (Hübner, [1819])
- Udea languidalis Eversmann, 1842
- Udea lutealis (Hübner, [1809])
- Udea numeralis (Hübner, 1796)
- Udea olivalis ([Denis & Schiffermüller], 1775)
- Udea rhododendronalis Duponchel, 1834
- Udea silvalis de Joannis, 1891
- Udea vastalis Hampson, 1900
- Ulotricha egregialis Herrich-Schäffer, 1838
- Uresiphita limbalis ([Denis & Schiffermüller], 1775)
- Xanthocrambus saxonellus Zincken, 1821
- Zophodia grossulariella Zincken, 1818
- Zophodiodes leucocostella Ragonot, 1887

== Thyridae ==
- Thyris fenestrella Scopoli, 1763

== Lasiocampidae ==
- Chilena sordida Erschoff, 1874
- Chondrostega osthelderi Püngeler, 1925
- Chondrostega pastrana Lederer, 1858
- Dendrolimus pini (Linnaeus, 1758)
- Eriogaster catax (Linnaeus, 1758)
- Eriogaster czipkai Lajonquiere, 1975
- Eriogaster lanestris (Linnaeus, 1758)
- Eriogaster nippei Freina, 1988
- Eriogaster pfeifferi Daniel, 1932
- Eriogaster rimicola Schrank, 1802
- Euthrix potatoria (Linnaeus, 1758)
- Gastropacha populifolia (Esper, [1783])
- Gastropacha quercifolia (Linnaeus, 1758)
- Lasiocampa eversmanni Kindermann, 1843
- Lasiocampa grandis Rogenhofer, 1891
- Lasiocampa quercus (Linnaeus, 1758)
- Lasiocampa trifolii ([Denis & Schiffermüller], 1775)
- Macrothylacia rubi (Linnaeus, 1758)
- Malacosoma alpicolum Staudinger, 1870
- Malacosoma castrensis (Linnaeus, 1758)
- Malacosoma franconicum ([Denis & Schiffermüller], 1775)
- Malacosoma neustrium (Linnaeus, 1758)
- Malacosoma paralellum Staudinger, 1887
- Odonestis pruni (Linnaeus, 1758)
- Pachypasa otus Drury, 1773
- Phyllodesma tremulifolia (Hübner, [1810])
- Poecilocampa alpina Frey & Wullschlegel, 1874
- Sena proxima Staudinger, 1894
- Trichiura crataegi (Linnaeus, 1758)
- Trichiura verenae Witt, 1981

== Bombycidae ==
- Bombyx mori (Linnaeus, 1758)

== Lemoniidae ==
- Lemonia balcanica Herrich-Schäffer, [1843]
- Lemonia ballioni Christoph, 1888
- Lemonia dumi (Linnaeus, 1761)
- Lemonia pauli Staudinger, 1894
- Lemonia pia Püngeler, 1902
- Lemonia syriensis Daniel, 1953

== Endromidae ==
- Endromis versicolora (Linnaeus, 1758)

== Saturniidae ==
- Neoris huttoni Moore, 1862
- Pavonia cephalariae Romanoff, 1885
- Pavonia pavonia (Linnaeus, 1758)
- Pavonia spini ([Denis & Schiffermüller], 1775)
- Perisomena caecigena Kupido, 1825
- Saturnia pyri ([Denis & Schiffermüller], 1775)

== Brahmaeidae ==
- Brahmaea ledereri Rogenhofer, 1873

== Geometridae ==
- Abraxas grossulariatus (Linnaeus, 1758)
- Agriopis ankeraria Staudinger, 1861
- Agriopis aurantiaria (Hübner, [1799])
- Agriopis brumaria Borkhausen, 1794
- Agriopis marginaria (Fabricius, 1777)
- Agriopis vittaria Sulzer, 1776
- Alcis repandatus (Linnaeus, 1758)
- Aleucis distinctata Herrich-Schäffer, [1839]
- Aleucis mimetes Wehrli, 1932
- Aleucis orientalis Staudinger, 1892
- Alsophila ligustriaria Lang, 1789
- Amorphogynia necessaria Zeller, 1849
- Angerona prunaria (Linnaeus, 1758)
- Anticlea badiata Lang, 1789
- Anticlea derivata ([Denis & Schiffermüller], 1775)
- Antonechloris smaragdaria (Fabricius, 1787)
- Apeira syringaria (Linnaeus, 1758)
- Aplasta ononaria Fuessly, 1783
- Aplocera annexata Freyer, [1830]
- Aplocera columbata Metzner, 1845
- Aplocera dervenaria Mentzer, 1981
- Aplocera efformata Guenée, 1857
- Aplocera fraternata Herrich-Schäffer, 1861
- Aplocera fraudulentata Herrich-Schäffer, 1861
- Aplocera guneyi Riemis, 1992
- Aplocera mundata Staudinger, 1892
- Aplocera mundulata Guenée, 1857
- Aplocera musculata Staudinger, 1892
- Aplocera numidaria Herrich-Schäffer, [1852]
- Aplocera obsitaria Lederer, 1853
- Aplocera opificata Lederer, 1870
- Aplocera plagiata (Linnaeus, 1758)
- Aplocera simpliciata Treitschke, 1835
- Aplocera uniformata Urbahn, 1971
- Apocheima hispidaria ([Denis & Schiffermüller], 1775)
- Apochima flabellaria Heeger, 1838
- Apochima rjabovi Wehrli, 1936
- Archiearis notha (Hübner, [1823])
- Artiora evonymaria (Hübner, [1799])
- Ascotis turcaria (Fabricius, 1775)
- Asovia maeoticaria Alphéraky, 1876
- Aspitates ochrearia Rossi, 1794
- Aspitates quadripunctata Goeze, 1781
- Asthena albulata (Hufnagel, 1767)
- Biston achyrus Wehrli, 1936
- Biston betularius (Linnaeus, 1758)
- Biston strataria (Hufnagel, 1767)
- Boarmia roboraria (Fabricius, 1787)
- Boarmia viertlii Bohatsch, 1883
- Bupalus piniarius (Linnaeus, 1758)
- Cabera pusaria (Linnaeus, 1758)
- Calodyscia sicanaria Oberthür, 1923
- Calospilos pantaria (Linnaeus, 1767)
- Calospilos sylvata Scopoli, 1763
- Campaea honoraria ([Denis & Schiffermüller], 1775)
- Campaea margaritata (Linnaeus, 1767)
- Camptogramma bilineata (Linnaeus, 1758)
- Camptogramma grisescens Staudinger, 1892
- Carsia lythoxylata (Hübner, [1799])
- Casilda antophilaria (Hübner, [1813])
- Cataclysme riguata (Hübner, [1823])
- Catarhoe cuculata (Hufnagel, 1767)
- Catarhoe cupreata Herrich-Schäffer, 1839
- Catarhoe permixtaria Guenée, 1857
- Catarhoe putridaria Herrich-Schäffer, [1852]
- Catarhoe rubidata ([Denis & Schiffermüller], 1775)
- Chemerina caliginearia Rambur, 1833
- Chesias korbi Bohatsch, 1909
- Chesias rufata (Fabricius, 1775)
- Chesias sureyata Rebel, 1931
- Chlorissa asphaleia Wiltshire, 1966
- Chlorissa pretiosaria Staudinger, 1877
- Chlorissa pulmentaria Guenée, 1857
- Chlorissa viridata (Linnaeus, 1758)
- Chloroclysta miata (Linnaeus, 1758)
- Chloroclysta siterata (Hufnagel, 1767)
- Chloroclysta truncata (Hufnagel, 1767)
- Chloroclystis chloerata Mabille, 1870
- Chloroclystis rectangulata (Linnaeus, 1758)
- Chloroclystis v-ata Haworth, [1809]
- Chrysocraspeda charites Oberthür, 1916
- Cidaria fulvata Forster, 1771
- Cinglis humifusaria Eversmann, 1837
- Cleora cinctaria ([Denis & Schiffermüller], 1775)
- Cleorodes lichenaria (Hufnagel, 1767)
- Cleta filacearia Herrich-Schäffer, [1847]
- Cleta perpusillaria Eversmann, 1847
- Cleta ramosaria Villers, 1789
- Cnestrognophos anthina Wehrli, 1953
- Cnestrognophos libanoticus Wehrli, 1931
- Cnestrognophos mutilatus Staudinger, 1879
- Colostygia olivata ([Denis & Schiffermüller], 1775)
- Colostygia pectinataria Knoch, 1781
- Colostygia schneideraria Lederer, 1855
- Colotois pennaria (Linnaeus, 1761)
- Comibaena bajularia ([Denis & Schiffermüller], 1775)
- Comibaena neriaria Herrich-Schäffer, [1852]
- Cosmorhoe ocellata (Linnaeus, 1758)
- Costaconvexa polygrammata Borkhausen, 1794
- Crocallis elinguaria (Linnaeus, 1758)
- Crocallis inexpectata Warnecke, 1940
- Crocallis tusciaria Borkhausen, 1793
- Culpinia prouti Thierry-Mieg, 1913
- Cyclophora albiocellaria (Hübner, 1822)
- Cyclophora annulata (Schulze, 1775)
- Cyclophora linearia (Hübner, [1799])
- Cyclophora porata (Linnaeus, 1767)
- Cyclophora punctaria (Linnaeus, 1758)
- Cyclophora puppillaria (Hübner, [1799])
- Cyclophora quercimontaria Bastelberger, 1897
- Cyclophora ruficiliaria Herrich-Schäffer, [1855]
- Cyclophora suppunctaria Zeller, 1847
- Dasycorsa modesta Staudinger, 1879
- Dicrognophos amanensis Wehrli, 1934
- Dicrognophos pseudosnelleni Rjabov, 1964
- Dicrognophos sartatus Treitschke, 1827
- Discoloxia blomeri Curtis, 1832
- Dyscia conspersaria ([Denis & Schiffermüller], 1775)
- Dyscia lentiscaria Donzel, 1837
- Dyscia sultanica Wehrli, 1936
- Ecliptopera silaceata ([Denis & Schiffermüller], 1775)
- Ectropis bistortata Goeze, 1781
- Ectropis consonaria (Hübner, [1799])
- Eilicrinia acardia Stichel, 1911
- Eilicrinia cordiaria (Hübner, 1790)
- Eilicrinia subcordiaria Herrich-Schäffer, [1852]
- Eilicrinia trinotata Metzner, 1845
- Ematurga atomaria (Linnaeus, 1758)
- Enanthyperythra legataria Herrich-Schäffer, [1852]
- Ennomos autumnaria Werneburg, 1859
- Ennomos effractaria Freyer, [1842]
- Ennomos erosaria (Hübner, 1790)
- Ennomos fraxineti Wiltshire, 1947
- Ennomos quercaria (Hübner, [1813])
- Ennomos quercinaria (Hufnagel, 1767)
- Entephria caesiata ([Denis & Schiffermüller], 1775)
- Entephria ignorata Staudinger, 1892
- Epilobophora sabinata Geyer, [1831]
- Epione paralellaria ([Denis & Schiffermüller], 1775)
- Epione repandaria (Hufnagel, 1767)
- Epirrhoe alternata (Müller, 1764)
- Epirrhoe galiata ([Denis & Schiffermüller], 1775)
- Epirrhoe molluginata (Hübner, [1813])
- Epirrhoe rivata (Hübner, [1813])
- Epirrhoe tristata (Linnaeus, 1758)
- Epirrita nebulata Borgstroem, 1784
- Erannis declinans Staudinger, 1879
- Erannis defoliaria (Linnaeus, 1761)
- Euchoeca nebulata Scopoli, 1763
- Euchrognophos dubitarius Staudinger, 1892
- Euchrognophos nanodes Wehrli, 1936
- Euchrognophos variegata Duponchel, 1830
- Eucrostes indigenata Villers, 1789
- Eulithis prunata (Linnaeus, 1758)
- Eulithis roessleraria Staudinger, 1871
- Eumannia oppositaria Mann, 1864
- Eumera hoeferi Wehrli, 1934
- Eumera regina Staudinger, 1892
- Eumera turcosyrica Wehrli, 1932
- Eunychiodes amygdalaria Herrich-Schäffer, [1848]
- Eunychiodes divergaria Staudinger, 1892
- Eunychiodes variabila Brandt, 1938
- Euphyia biangulata Haworth, [1809]
- Euphyia chalusata Wiltshire, 1970
- Euphyia frustata Treitschke, 1828
- Euphyia sintenisi Staudinger, 1892
- Eupithecia abietaria Goeze, 1781
- Eupithecia achyrdaghica Wehrli, 1929
- Eupithecia adscriptaria Staudinger, 1871
- Eupithecia albosparsata de Joannis, 1891
- Eupithecia alliaria Staudinger, 1870
- Eupithecia amasina Bohatsch, 1893
- Eupithecia arenbergeri Pinker, 1976
- Eupithecia bastelbergeri Dietze, 1913
- Eupithecia breviculata Donzel, 1837
- Eupithecia brunneata Staudinger, 1900
- Eupithecia buxata Pinker, 1958
- Eupithecia calligraphata Wagner, 1929
- Eupithecia centaureata ([Denis & Schiffermüller], 1775)
- Eupithecia cerussaria Lederer, 1855
- Eupithecia cuculliaria Rebel, 1901
- Eupithecia denotata (Hübner, [1813])
- Eupithecia denticulata Treitschke, 1828
- Eupithecia distinctaria Herrich-Schäffer, [1848]
- Eupithecia euxinata Bohatsch, 1893
- Eupithecia expallidata Doubleday, 1856
- Eupithecia extraversaria Herrich-Schäffer, [1852]
- Eupithecia extremata (Fabricius, 1787)
- Eupithecia furcata Staudinger, 1879
- Eupithecia gemellata Herrich-Schäffer, 1861
- Eupithecia graphata Treitschke, 1828
- Eupithecia gratiosata Herrich-Schäffer, 1861
- Eupithecia gueneata Mabille, 1862
- Eupithecia haworthiata Doubleday, 1856
- Eupithecia icterata Villers, 1789
- Eupithecia impurata (Hübner, [1813])
- Eupithecia inconspicuata Bohatsch, 1893
- Eupithecia indigata (Hübner, [1813])
- Eupithecia innotata (Hufnagel, 1767)
- Eupithecia insigniata (Hübner, 1790)
- Eupithecia intricata Zetterstedt, [1839]
- Eupithecia irriguata (Hübner, [1813])
- Eupithecia irritaria Staudinger, 1892
- Eupithecia korvaci Prout, 1939
- Eupithecia kunzi Pinker, 1976
- Eupithecia lacteolata Dietze, 1906
- Eupithecia laquaearia Herrich-Schäffer, [1848]
- Eupithecia limbata Staudinger, 1879
- Eupithecia linariata (Fabricius, 1787)
- Eupithecia lutosaria Bohatsch, 1893
- Eupithecia maeoticaria Bohatsch, 1893
- Eupithecia marasa Wehrli, 1932
- Eupithecia marginata Staudinger, 1892
- Eupithecia mesogrammata Dietze, 1910
- Eupithecia millefoliata Roesler, 1866
- Eupithecia nigritaria Staudinger, 1879
- Eupithecia novata Dietze, 1903
- Eupithecia ochridata Pinker, 1968
- Eupithecia ochrovittata Christoph, 1887
- Eupithecia oxycedrata Rambur, 1833
- Eupithecia pfeifferi Wehrli, 1929
- Eupithecia pinkeri Mironov, 1991
- Eupithecia plumbeolata Haworth, [1809]
- Eupithecia pseudocastigata Pinker, 1976
- Eupithecia pulchellata Stephens, 1831
- Eupithecia pusillata (Fabricius, 1787)
- Eupithecia quercetica Prout, 1938
- Eupithecia reisserata Pinker, 1976
- Eupithecia saueri Vojnits, 1978
- Eupithecia scalptata Christoph, 1885
- Eupithecia schiefereri Bohatsch, 1893
- Eupithecia scopariata Rambur, 1833
- Eupithecia semigraphata Bruand, [1847]
- Eupithecia separata Staudinger, 1879
- Eupithecia silenata Assman, 1849
- Eupithecia silenicolata Mabille, 1867
- Eupithecia simpliciata Haworth, [1809]
- Eupithecia spadiceata Zerny, 1933
- Eupithecia spissilineata Metzner, 1846
- Eupithecia staudingeri Bohatsch, 1893
- Eupithecia subfenestrata Staudinger, 1892
- Eupithecia subfuscata Haworth, [1809]
- Eupithecia subsequaria Herrich-Schäffer, [1852]
- Eupithecia subumbrata ([Denis & Schiffermüller], 1775)
- Eupithecia succenturiata (Linnaeus, 1758)
- Eupithecia syriacata Staudinger, 1879
- Eupithecia tantillaria Boisduval, 1840
- Eupithecia terrenata Dietze, 1913
- Eupithecia tripunctaria Herrich-Schäffer, [1852]
- Eupithecia undata Freyer, [1840]
- Eupithecia unedonata Mabille, 1868
- Eupithecia variostrigata Alphéraky, 1876
- Eupithecia venosata (Fabricius, 1787)
- Eupithecia vulgata Haworth, [1809]
- Eupithecia wehrlii Wagner, 1931
- Eustroma mardinata Staudinger, 1895
- Fritzwagneria waltheri Wagner, 1919
- Geometra papilionaria (Linnaeus, 1758)
- Glossotrophia confinaria Herrich-Schäffer, [1847]
- Glossotrophia diffinaria Prout, 1913
- Gnopharmia colchidaria Lederer, 1870
- Gnopharmia objectaria Staudinger, 1892
- Gnopharmia rubraria Staudinger, 1892
- Gymnoscelis dearmata (Dietze, 1904)
- Gymnoscelis rufifasciata Haworth, [1809]
- Gypsochroa renitidata (Hübner, [1817])
- Hemistola chrysoprasaria (Esper, [1794])
- Hemithea aestivaria (Hübner, [1799])
- Heterolocha laminaria Herrich-Schäffer, [1852]
- Hierochthonia pulverata Warren, 1901
- Horisme corticata Treitschke, 1835
- Horisme tersata ([Denis & Schiffermüller], 1775)
- Horisme vitalbata (Hübner, [1799])
- Hydria cervinalis Scopoli, 1763
- Hydria undulata (Linnaeus, 1758)
- Hydriomena coerulata (Fabricius, 1777)
- Hydriomena furcata Thunberg, 1784
- Hydriomena ruberata Freyer, [1831]
- Hylaea cedricola Wehrli, 1929
- Hylaea fasciaria (Linnaeus, 1758)
- Hylaea pinicolaria Bellier, 1861
- Hypoxystis pluviaria (Fabricius, 1787)
- Idaea affinitata Bang-Haas, 1907
- Idaea albitorquata Püngeler, 1907
- Idaea allongata Staudinger, 1898
- Idaea antennata Wehrli, 1931
- Idaea aureolaria ([Denis & Schiffermüller], 1775)
- Idaea aversata (Linnaeus, 1758)
- Idaea biselata (Hufnagel, 1767)
- Idaea camparia Herrich-Schäffer, [1852]
- Idaea cervantaria Millire, 1869
- Idaea circuitaria (Hübner, [1819])
- Idaea congruata Zeller, 1847
- Idaea consanguinaria Lederer, 1853
- Idaea consociata Staudinger, 1900
- Idaea consolidata Lederer, 1853
- Idaea degeneraria (Hübner, [1799])
- Idaea determinata Staudinger, 1876
- Idaea deversaria Herrich-Schäffer, [1847]
- Idaea dilutaria (Hübner, [1799])
- Idaea dimidiata (Hufnagel, 1767)
- Idaea efflorata Zeller, 1849
- Idaea elongaria Rambur, 1833
- Idaea emarginata (Linnaeus, 1758)
- Idaea fasciata Staudinger, 1892
- Idaea fathmaria Oberthür, 1876
- Idaea filicata (Hübner, [1799])
- Idaea flaveolaria (Hübner, [1809])
- Idaea fuscovenosa Goeze, 1781
- Idaea gracilipennis Warren, 1901
- Idaea hilliata Homberg, 1909
- Idaea humiliata (Hufnagel, 1767)
- Idaea infirmaria Rambur, 1833
- Idaea inquinata Scopoli, 1763
- Idaea intermedia Staudinger, 1879
- Idaea laevigata Scopoli, 1763
- Idaea mediaria (Hübner, [1819])
- Idaea metohiensis Rebel, 1900
- Idaea moniliata ([Denis & Schiffermüller], 1775)
- Idaea muricata (Hufnagel, 1767)
- Idaea nitidata Herrich-Schäffer, 1861
- Idaea obsoletaria Rambur, 1833
- Idaea ochrata Scopoli, 1763
- Idaea ossiculata Lederer, 1871
- Idaea osthelderi Wehrli, 1932
- Idaea ostrinaria (Hübner, [1813])
- Idaea pallidata ([Denis & Schiffermüller], 1775)
- Idaea peluraria Reisser, 1939
- Idaea politaria (Hübner, [1799])
- Idaea proclivata Fuchs, 1902
- Idaea roseofasciata Christoph, 1882
- Idaea rufaria (Hübner, [1799])
- Idaea ruficostata Zeller, 1847
- Idaea rusticata ([Denis & Schiffermüller], 1775)
- Idaea sericeata (Hübner, [1813])
- Idaea serpentata (Hufnagel, 1767)
- Idaea sodaliaria Herrich-Schäffer, [1852]
- Idaea straminata Borkhausen, 1794
- Idaea subpurpurata Staudinger, 1900
- Idaea subsericeata Haworth, [1809]
- Idaea sylvestraria (Hübner, [1799])
- Idaea taurica Bang-Haas, 1907
- Idaea textaria Lederer, 1861
- Idaea tineata Thierry-Mieg, 1910
- Idaea trigeminata Haworth, [1809]
- Idaea troglodytaria Herrich-Schäffer, [1852]
- Idaea vulpinaria Herrich-Schäffer, [1852]
- Itame vincularia (Hübner, [1813])
- Itame wauaria (Linnaeus, 1758)
- Jodis lactearia (Linnaeus, 1758)
- Kentrognophos ciscaucasicus Rjabov, 1964
- Kentrognophos mardinarius Staudinger, 1901
- Kentrognophos onustarius Herrich-Schäffer, [1852]
- Kentrognophos zeitunarius Staudinger, 1901
- Larentia clavaria Haworth, [1809]
- Libanonia semitata Prout, 1913
- Ligdia adustata (Fabricius, 1787)
- Ligdia lassulata Rogenhofer, 1873
- Lithostege ancyrana Prout, 1938
- Lithostege bosphoraria Herrich-Schäffer, [1848]
- Lithostege farinata (Hufnagel, 1767)
- Lithostege griseata ([Denis & Schiffermüller], 1775)
- Lithostege infuscata Eversmann, 1837
- Lithostege odessaria Boisduval, 1848
- Lithostege palaestinensis Amsel, 1935
- Lithostege witzenmanni Standfuss, 1892
- Lobophora halterata (Hufnagel, 1767)
- Lomaspilis marginata (Linnaeus, 1758)
- Lomaspilis opis Butler, 1879
- Lomographa punctata (Fabricius, 1775)
- Lycia graecaria Staudinger, 1861
- Lycia hirtaria (Linnaeus, 1761)
- Lycia pomonaria (Hübner, 1790)
- Lycia zonaria ([Denis & Schiffermüller], 1775)
- Lysognophos certhiatus Rebel, & Zerny, 1931
- Lysognophos lividatus (Fabricius, 1787)
- Lythria purpuraria (Linnaeus, 1758)
- Lythria rotaria (Fabricius, 1798)
- Melanthia procellata ([Denis & Schiffermüller], 1775)
- Menophra abruptaria Thunberg, 1792
- Menophra japygiaria Costa, 1849
- Menophra trypanaria Wiltshire, 1948
- Microloxia herbaria (Hübner, [1813])
- Minoa murinata Scopoli, 1763
- Myinodes interpunctaria Herrich-Schäffer, 1839
- Narraga cappadocica Herbulot, 1943
- Narraga fasciolaria (Hufnagel, 1767)
- Nebula achromaria Harpe, 1852
- Nebula apiciata Staudinger, 1892
- Nebula approxiamata Staudinger, 1879
- Nebula ludificata Lederer, 1870
- Nebula reclamata Prout, 1914
- Nebula salicata (Hübner, [1799])
- Nebula senectaria Herrich-Schäffer, [1852]
- Nebula vartianata Wiltshire, 1970
- Neognopharmia stevenaria Boisduval, 1840
- Neognophina pfeifferi Wehrli, 1926
- Nychiodes obscuraria Villers, 1789
- Nychiodes rayatica Wiltshire, 1957
- Ochodontia adustaria Fischer de Waldheim, 1840
- Odezia atrata (Linnaeus, 1758)
- Odonthognophos zacharius Staudinger, 1879
- Odontopera bidentata (Linnaeus, 1761)
- Operophtera brumata (Linnaeus, 1758)
- Operophtera fagata Scharfenberg, 1805
- Opisthograptis luteolata (Linnaeus, 1758)
- Opisthograptis niko Christoph, 1893
- Organognophos wanensis Wehrli, 1936
- Orthonama lignata (Hübner, [1799])
- Orthonama obstipata (Fabricius, 1794)
- Orthostixis calcularia Lederer, 1853
- Orthostixis cribraria (Hübner, [1799])
- Oulobophora externata Freyer, 1846
- Oulobophora internata Püngeler, 1888
- Ourapteryx malatyenis Wehrli, 1936
- Ourapteryx persica Ménétriés, 1832
- Ourapteryx sambucaria (Linnaeus, 1758)
- Pachycnemia hippocastanaria (Hübner, [1799])
- Pareulype berberata (Fabricius, 1787)
- Pellonia vibicaria (Linnaeus, 1761)
- Pelurga comitata (Linnaeus, 1758)
- Pennithera firmata (Hübner, 1822)
- Perconia strigillaria (Hübner, 1787)
- Peribatodes correptarius Zeller, 1847
- Peribatodes gemmaria Brahm, 1791
- Peribatodes manuelaria Herrich-Schäffer, [1852]
- Peribatodes perversarius Boisduval, 1840
- Peribatodes secundaria (Esper, [1794])
- Peribatodes syrilibanoni Wehrli, 1931
- Peribatodes umbraria (Hübner, [1809])
- Perizoma albulata ([Denis & Schiffermüller], 1775)
- Perizoma alchemillata (Linnaeus, 1758)
- Perizoma blandiatum ([Denis & Schiffermüller], 1775)
- Perizoma flavofasciatum Thunberg, 1792
- Perizoma gigas Wiltshire, 1976
- Perizoma parahydratum Alberti, 1969
- Perizoma verberata Scopoli, 1763
- Petrophora chlorosata Scopoli, 1763
- Petrophora narbonea (Linnaeus, 1767)
- Phaselia serrularia Eversmann, 1847
- Phibalapteryx virgata (Hufnagel, 1767)
- Phigalia pedaria (Fabricius, 1787)
- Philereme senescens Staudinger, 1892
- Philereme transversata (Hufnagel, 1767)
- Philereme vetulata ([Denis & Schiffermüller], 1775)
- Phyllometra culminaria Eversmann, 1843
- Plagodis dolabraria (Linnaeus, 1767)
- Plemyria rubiginata ([Denis & Schiffermüller], 1775)
- Problepsis ocellata Frivaldsky, 1845
- Protorhoe corollaria Herrich-Schäffer, [1848]
- Protorhoe renodata Püngeler, 1908
- Protorhoe unicata Guenée, 1857
- Proutictis artesiaria ([Denis & Schiffermüller], 1775)
- Pseudopanthera macularia (Linnaeus, 1758)
- Pseudopanthera syriacata Guenée, 1852
- Pseudoterpna coronillaria (Hübner, [1817])
- Pseudoterpna pruinata (Hufnagel, 1767)
- Pungeleria capreolaria (Fabricius, 1787)
- Pydna badiaria Freyer, [1841]
- Rheumaptera hastata (Linnaeus, 1758)
- Rheumaptera montivagata Duponchel, 1830
- Rhodometra sacraria (Linnaeus, 1767)
- Rhodostrophia calabra Petagna, 1786
- Rhodostrophia jacularia (Hübner 1813)
- Rhodostrophia sieversi Christoph, 1882
- Rhodostrophia tabidaria Zeller, 1847
- Rhoptria asperaria (Hübner, [1817])
- Rhoptria dolosaria Herrich-Schäffer, [1848]
- Rhoptria mardinata Staudinger, 1900
- Schistostege nubilaria (Hübner, [1799])
- Scopula beckeraria Lederer, 1853
- Scopula decorata ([Denis & Schiffermüller], 1775)
- Scopula drenowskii Sterneck, 1941
- Scopula flaccidaria Zeller, 1852
- Scopula imitaria (Hübner, [1799])
- Scopula immistaria Herrich-Schäffer, [1852]
- Scopula immorata (Linnaeus, 1758)
- Scopula immutata (Linnaeus, 1758)
- Scopula incanata (Linnaeus, 1758)
- Scopula luridata Zeller, 1847
- Scopula marginepunctata Goeze, 1781
- Scopula nigropunctata (Hufnagel, 1767)
- Scopula ochroleucaria Herrich-Schäffer, [1847]
- Scopula orientalis Alphéraky, 1876
- Scopula ornata Scopoli, 1763
- Scopula pseudohonestata Wehrli,
- Scopula rubiginata (Hufnagel, 1767)
- Scopula submutata Treitschke, 1828
- Scopula tessellaria Boisduval, 1840
- Scopula transcaspica Prout, 1935
- Scopula turbidaria (Hübner, [1819])
- Scopula virgulata ([Denis & Schiffermüller], 1775)
- Scotopteryx alpherakii Erschoff, 1877
- Scotopteryx bipunctaria ([Denis & Schiffermüller], 1775)
- Scotopteryx chenopodiata (Linnaeus, 1758)
- Scotopteryx coarctaria ([Denis & Schiffermüller], 1775)
- Scotopteryx langi Christoph, 1885
- Scotopteryx luridata (Hufnagel, 1767)
- Scotopteryx moeniata Scopoli, 1763
- Scotopteryx mucronata Scopoli, 1763
- Scotopteryx nebulata Bang-Haas, 1907
- Scotopteryx octodurensis Favre, 1902
- Scotopteryx vicinaria Duponchel, [1845]
- Selenia dentaria (Fabricius, 1775)
- Selenia lunularia (Hübner, 1788)
- Selenia tetralunaria (Hufnagel, 1767)
- Selidosema brunnearia Villers, 1789
- Selidosema rorarium (Fabricius, 1777)
- Semiothisa aestimaria (Hübner, [1809])
- Semiothisa alternata ([Denis & Schiffermüller], 1775)
- Semiothisa clathrata (Linnaeus, 1758)
- Semiothisa glarearia Brahm, 1791
- Semiothisa liturata (Linnaeus, 1761)
- Semiothisa notata (Linnaeus, 1758)
- Semiothisa rippertaria Duponchel, 1830
- Semiothisa signaria (Hübner, [1809])
- Semiothisa syriacaria Staudinger, 1871
- Serraca punctinalis Scopoli, 1763
- Siona lineata Scopoli, 1763
- Stamnodes depeculata Lederer, 1870
- Stegania dalmataria Guenée, 1857
- Stegania dilectaria (Hübner, 1790)
- Stegania trimaculata Villers, 1789
- Stueningia poggearia Lederer, 1855
- Stueningia wolfi Hausmann, 1993
- Synopsia sociaria (Hübner, [1799])
- Tephrina arenacearia ([Denis & Schiffermüller], 1775)
- Tephrina hopfferaria Staudinger, 1879
- Tephrina inconspicuaria (Hübner, [1817])
- Tephrina murinaria ([Denis & Schiffermüller], 1775)
- Tephronia sepiaria (Hufnagel, 1767)
- Thalera fimbrialis Scopoli, 1763
- Thera britannica Turner, 1925
- Thera cognata Thunberg, 1792
- Thera cupressata Freyer, [1830]
- Thera juniperata (Linnaeus, 1758)
- Thera obeliscata (Hübner, 1787)
- Thera variata ([Denis & Schiffermüller], 1775)
- Therapis flavicaria ([Denis & Schiffermüller], 1775)
- Theria rupicapraria ([Denis & Schiffermüller], 1775)
- Thetidia volgaria Guenée, 1857
- Timandra griseata Petersen, 1902
- Trichodezia haberhaueri Lederer, 1864
- Triphosa agnata Cerf, 1918
- Triphosa dubitata (Linnaeus, 1758)
- Triphosa sabaudiata Duponchel, 1830
- Triphosa taochata Lederer, 1870
- Warneckeella malatyana Wehrli, 1934
- Wehrliola revocaria Staudinger, 1892
- Xanthorhoe biriviata Borkhausen, 1794
- Xanthorhoe designata (Hufnagel, 1767)
- Xanthorhoe ferrugata Clerck, 1759
- Xanthorhoe fluctuata (Linnaeus, 1758)
- Xanthorhoe inconsiderata Staudinger, 1892
- Xanthorhoe montanata ([Denis & Schiffermüller], 1775)
- Xanthorhoe munitata (Hübner, [1809])
- Xanthorhoe oxybiata Millire, 1872
- Xanthorhoe quadrifasciaria (Linnaeus, 1761)
- Xanthorhoe rectifasciaria Lederer, 1853
- Xenochlorodes beryllaria Mann, 1853
- Xenochlorodes olympiaria Herrich-Schäffer, [1852]
- unplaced auctata Staudinger, 1879

== Cimeliidae ==
- Axia olga Staudinger, 1900
- Axia theresiae Korb, 1900

== Drepanidae ==
- Cilix asiatica Bang-Haas, 1907
- Cilix glaucata Scopoli, 1763
- Drepana falcataria (Linnaeus, 1758)
- Watsonalla binaria (Hufnagel, 1767)
- Watsonalla cultraria (Fabricius, 1775)
- Watsonalla uncinula Borkhausen, 1790

== Thyatiridae ==
- Cymatophorina diluta ([Denis & Schiffermüller], 1775)
- Habrosyne pyritoides (Hufnagel, 1766)
- Polyploca korbi Rebel, 1901
- Polyploca ruficollis (Fabricius, 1787)
- Tethea ocularis (Linnaeus, 1767)
- Tethea or ([Denis & Schiffermüller], 1775)
- Thyatira batis (Linnaeus, 1758)
- Thyatira hedemanni Christoph, 1885

== Sphingidae ==
- Acherontia atropos (Linnaeus, 1758)
- Agrius convolvuli (Linnaeus, 1758)
- Akbesia davidi Oberthür, 1884
- Clarina kotschyi Kollar, [1849]
- Daphnis nerii (Linnaeus, 1758)
- Deilephila elpenor (Linnaeus, 1758)
- Deilephila porcellus (Linnaeus, 1758)
- Deilephila suellus Staudinger, 1878
- Dolbina elegans A.Bang-Haas, 1927
- Hemaris croatica (Esper, [1779])
- Hemaris dentata Staudinger, 1887
- Hemaris fuciformis (Linnaeus, 1758)
- Hemaris tityus (Linnaeus, 1758)
- Hippotion celerio (Linnaeus, 1758)
- Hyles centralasiae Staudinger, 1887
- Hyles euphorbiae (Linnaeus, 1758)
- Hyles gallii (Rottemburg, 1775)
- Hyles hippophaes (Esper, [1789])
- Hyles livornica (Esper, [1779])
- Hyles nicaea Prunner, 1798
- Hyles vespertilio (Esper, [1779])
- Hyles zygophylli
- Hyloicus pinastri (Linnaeus, 1758)
- Hyloicus Hübner, [1819]
- Laothoe populi (Linnaeus, 1758)
- Macroglossum stellatarum (Linnaeus, 1758)
- Marumba quercus ([Denis & Schiffermüller], 1775)
- Mimas tiliae (Linnaeus, 1758)
- Proserpinus proserpinus Pallas, 1772
- Rethera brandti O.Bang-Haas, 1937
- Rethera komarovi Christoph, 1885
- Smerinthus kindermannii Lederer, 1852
- Smerinthus ocellatus (Linnaeus, 1758)
- Sphingaenopiopsis gorgoniades (Hübner, [1819])
- Sphinx ligustri (Linnaeus, 1758)
- Theretra alecto (Linnaeus, 1758)

== Notodontidae ==
- Cerura intermedia Teich, 1896
- Cerura vinula (Linnaeus, 1758)
- Clostera anachoreta (Fabricius, 1787)
- Clostera curtula (Linnaeus, 1758)
- Clostera pigra (Hufnagel, 1766)
- Dicranura ulmi ([Denis & Schiffermüller], 1775)
- Drymonia dodonaea ([Denis & Schiffermüller], 1775)
- Drymonia querna (Fabricius, 1787)
- Drymonia ruficornis (Hufnagel, 1766)
- Eligmodonta ziczac (Linnaeus, 1758)
- Furcula bicuspis Borkhausen, 1790
- Furcula bifida Brahm, 1787
- Furcula furcula (Linnaeus, 1761)
- Furcula interrupta Christoph, 1867
- Furcula syra Grum-Grshimailo, 1899
- Harpyia milhauseri (Fabricius, 1775)
- Neoharpyia pulcherrima Brandt, 1938
- Notodonta dromedarius (Linnaeus, 1767)
- Ochrostigma melagona (Hufnagel, 1766)
- Ochrostigma velitaris (Hufnagel, 1766)
- Paradrymonia vittata Staudinger, 1892
- Peridea anceps Goeze, 1781
- Peridea korbi Rebel, 1918
- Phalera bucephala (Linnaeus, 1758)
- Phalera bucephaloides Ochsenheimer, 1810
- Pheosia tremula (Linnaeus, 1761)
- Pterostoma palpina (Linnaeus, 1761)
- Ptilodon capucina (Linnaeus, 1758)
- Ptilodontella cucullina ([Denis & Schiffermüller], 1775)
- Ptilodontella saerdabensis Daniel, 1938
- Rhegmatophila alpina Bellier, 1881
- Spatalia argentina ([Denis & Schiffermüller], 1775)
- Stauropus fagi (Linnaeus, 1758)
- Tritopha tritopha ([Denis & Schiffermüller], 1775)

== Thaumetopoeidae ==
- Thaumetopoea processionea (Linnaeus, 1758)
- Thaumetopoea solitaria Freyer, [1838]
- Traumatocampa pinivora Treitschke, 1834
- Traumatocampa pityocampa ([Denis & Schiffermüller], 1775)
- Traumatocampa wilkinsoni Tams, 1925

== Lymantriidae ==
- Arctornis l-nigrum (Müller, 1764)
- Clethrogyna dubia Tauscher, 1806
- Dicallomera fascelina (Linnaeus, 1758)
- Elkneria pudipunda (Linnaeus, 1758)
- Euproctis chrysorrhoea (Linnaeus, 1758)
- Laelia coenosa (Hübner, [1808])
- Leucoma salicis (Linnaeus, 1758)
- Lymantria destituta Staudinger, 1892
- Lymantria dispar (Linnaeus, 1758)
- Lymantria lapidicola Herrich-Schäffer, 1852
- Lymantria monacha (Linnaeus, 1758)
- Ocneria detrita (Esper, [1785])
- Ocneria raddei Christoph, 1885
- Ocneria samarita Staudinger, 1895
- Ocneria terebinthi Freyer, [1838]
- Ocneria terebynthina Staudinger, 1894
- Ocnerogyia amanda Staudinger, 1892
- Orgyia antiqua (Linnaeus, 1758)
- Orgyia trigotephras Boisduval, 1829
- Sphrageidus melania Staudinger, 1891
- Sphrageidus similis (Fuessly, 1775)

== Arctiidae ==
- Ammobiota festiva (Hufnagel, 1766)
- Arctia caja (Linnaeus, 1758)
- Atolmis rubricollis (Linnaeus, 1758)
- Axiopoena maura Eichwald, 1830
- Callimorpha dominula (Linnaeus, 1758)
- Chelis maculosa Gerning, 1780
- Conjuncta conjuncta Staudinger, 1892
- Coscinia cribraria (Linnaeus, 1758)
- Cybosia mesomella (Linnaeus, 1758)
- Cymbalophora rivularis Ménétriés, 1832
- Diacrisia sannio (Linnaeus, 1758)
- Diaphora mendica (Linnaeus, 1761)
- Eilema caniola (Hübner, [1808])
- Eilema complana (Linnaeus, 1758)
- Eilema costalis Zeller, 1847
- Eilema griseola (Hübner, [1802])
- Eilema lurideola Zincken, 1817
- Eilema lutarella (Linnaeus, 1758)
- Eilema palliatella Scopoli, 1763
- Eilema pseudocomplana Daniel, 1939
- Eilema pygmaeola Doubleday, 1847
- Epatalmis caesarea Goeze, 1781
- Epicallia villica (Linnaeus, 1758)
- Euplagia quadripunctaria (Linnaeus, 1761)
- Euplagia splendidior Tams, 1922
- Hyphantria cunea Drury, 1773
- Hyphoraia aulica (Linnaeus, 1758)
- Katha deplana (Esper, [1787])
- Lacydes spectabilis Tauscher, 1806
- Lithosia quadra (Linnaeus, 1758)
- Maurica bellieri Lederer, 1855
- Miltochrista miniata Forster, 1771
- Muscula muscula Staudinger, 1899
- Nebrarctia semiramis Staudinger, 1892
- Nudaria mundana (Linnaeus, 1761)
- Ocnogyna anatolica Witt, 1980
- Ocnogyna herrichi Staudinger, 1879
- Ocnogyna loewii Zeller, 1846
- Ocnogyna parasita (Hübner, 1790)
- Paidia albescens Staudinger, 1892
- Paidia cinerascens Herrich-Schäffer, [1847]
- Paidia rica Freyer, [1855]
- Parasemia plantaginis (Linnaeus, 1758)
- Pelosia muscerda (Hufnagel, 1766)
- Pelosia obtusa Herrich-Schäffer, [1847]
- Phragmatobia fuliginosa (Linnaeus, 1758)
- Phragmatobia placida Frivaldsky, 1835
- Rhyparia purpurata (Linnaeus, 1758)
- Setina aurata Ménétriés, 1832
- Setina roscida ([Denis & Schiffermüller], 1775)
- Spilosoma lubricipeda (Linnaeus, 1758)
- Spilosoma luteum (Hufnagel, 1766)
- Spilosoma urticae (Esper, [1789])
- Spiris striata (Linnaeus, 1758)
- Thumatha senex (Hübner, [1808])
- Tyria jacobaeae (Linnaeus, 1758)
- Utetheisa pulchella (Linnaeus, 1758)
- Watsonarctia deserta Bartel, 1902
- Wittia sororcula (Hufnagel, 1766)

== Ctenuchidae ==
- Amata aequipuncta Turati, 1917
- Amata antiochena Lederer, 1861
- Amata banghaasi Obraztsov, 1966
- Amata caspia Staudinger, 1877
- Amata hakkariana Freina, 1982
- Amata phegea (Linnaeus, 1758)
- Amata rossica Turati, 1917
- Amata sintenisi Standfuss, 1892
- Amata tanina Freina, 1982
- Amata taurica Turati, 1917
- Amata transcaspica Obraztsov, 1941
- Amata wiltshirei Bytinski-Salz, 1939
- Callitomis dimorpha Bytinski-Salz, 1939
- Dysauxes ancilla (Linnaeus, 1767)
- Dysauxes famula Freyer, 1836
- Dysauxes punctata (Fabricius, 1781)
- Dysauxes syntomida Staudinger, 1892

== Noctuidae ==
About 1085 species – see: List of moths of Turkey (Noctuidae)
