= Phyllonorycter nivalis =

Scientific classification
- Kingdom: Animalia
- Phylum: Arthropoda
- Class: Insecta
- Order: Lepidoptera
- Family: Gracillariidae
- Genus: Phyllonorycter
- Species: P. nivalis

Binomial name
- Phyllonorycter nivalis Deschka, 1986

Species of moth

Phyllonorycter nivalis is a moth of the family Gracillariidae. It is known from Turkey.

The length of the forewings is about 3.9 mm.

The larvae feed on Quercus species. They mine the leaves of their host plant. The mine is found on the underside of the leaf.
