= Eupithecia nigritaria =

Scientific classification
- Domain: Eukaryota
- Kingdom: Animalia
- Phylum: Arthropoda
- Class: Insecta
- Order: Lepidoptera
- Family: Geometridae
- Genus: Eupithecia
- Species: E. nigritaria

Binomial name
- Eupithecia nigritaria Staudinger, 1879

Species of moth

Eupithecia nigritaria is a moth in the family Geometridae. It is found in Turkey.
