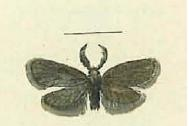

Scientific classification
- Kingdom: Animalia
- Phylum: Arthropoda
- Clade: Pancrustacea
- Class: Insecta
- Order: Lepidoptera
- Family: Psychidae
- Genus: Reisseronia
- Species: R. flavociliella

Binomial name
- Reisseronia flavociliella (Mann, 1864)

Synonyms
- Fumea flavociliella Mann, 1864

= Reisseronia flavociliella =

Species of moth

Reisseronia flavociliella is a moth of the Psychidae family. It is found in Turkey.
