= Phyllonorycter deleta =

Scientific classification
- Kingdom: Animalia
- Phylum: Arthropoda
- Class: Insecta
- Order: Lepidoptera
- Family: Gracillariidae
- Genus: Phyllonorycter
- Species: P. deleta

Binomial name
- Phyllonorycter deleta (Staudinger, 1880)

Species of moth

Phyllonorycter deleta is a moth of the family Gracillariidae. It is known from Turkey.
