= Eupithecia subsequaria =

Scientific classification
- Domain: Eukaryota
- Kingdom: Animalia
- Phylum: Arthropoda
- Class: Insecta
- Order: Lepidoptera
- Family: Geometridae
- Genus: Eupithecia
- Species: E. subsequaria

Binomial name
- Eupithecia subsequaria Herrich-Schaffer, 1852

Synonyms
- Eupithecia dubiosata Wagner, 1929; Eupithecia richteri Vardikjan, 1954

Species of moth

Eupithecia subsequaria is a moth in the family Geometridae. It is found in Turkey.
