= Prorophora albunculella =

Scientific classification
- Kingdom: Animalia
- Phylum: Arthropoda
- Class: Insecta
- Order: Lepidoptera
- Family: Pyralidae
- Genus: Prorophora
- Species: P. albunculella

Binomial name
- Prorophora albunculella (Staudinger, 1879)

Synonyms
- Myelois albunculella Staudinger, 1879; Proceratia rhectogramma Meyrick, 1937; Psorosa albunculella Ragonot, 1901

Species of moth

Prorophora albunculella is a species of snout moth. It is found in Turkey and Iraq.
