= Eupithecia novata =

Scientific classification
- Domain: Eukaryota
- Kingdom: Animalia
- Phylum: Arthropoda
- Class: Insecta
- Order: Lepidoptera
- Family: Geometridae
- Genus: Eupithecia
- Species: E. novata

Binomial name
- Eupithecia novata Dietze, 1904

Species of moth

Eupithecia novata is a moth in the family Geometridae. It is found in Iran and Turkey.
