= Eupithecia furcata =

Scientific classification
- Domain: Eukaryota
- Kingdom: Animalia
- Phylum: Arthropoda
- Class: Insecta
- Order: Lepidoptera
- Family: Geometridae
- Genus: Eupithecia
- Species: E. furcata

Binomial name
- Eupithecia furcata Staudinger, 1879

Synonyms
- Eupithecia fuscopunctata nigrobrunneopunctata Schwingenschuss, 1939

Species of moth

Eupithecia furcata is a moth in the family Geometridae. It is found in Iran and Turkey.
