= Eupithecia syriacata =

Scientific classification
- Domain: Eukaryota
- Kingdom: Animalia
- Phylum: Arthropoda
- Class: Insecta
- Order: Lepidoptera
- Family: Geometridae
- Genus: Eupithecia
- Species: E. syriacata

Binomial name
- Eupithecia syriacata Staudinger, 1879

Synonyms
- Tephroclystia semicaesia Warren, 1900

Species of moth

Eupithecia syriacata is a moth in the family Geometridae. It is found in Lebanon, Turkey and Syria.
