= Ethmia treitschkeella =

Scientific classification
- Domain: Eukaryota
- Kingdom: Animalia
- Phylum: Arthropoda
- Class: Insecta
- Order: Lepidoptera
- Family: Depressariidae
- Genus: Ethmia
- Species: E. treitschkeella

Binomial name
- Ethmia treitschkeella (Staudinger, 1879)

Synonyms
- Psecadia treitschkeella Staudinger, 1880

Species of moth

Ethmia treitschkeella is a moth in the family Depressariidae. It was described by Otto Staudinger in 1879. It is found in Asia Minor.
