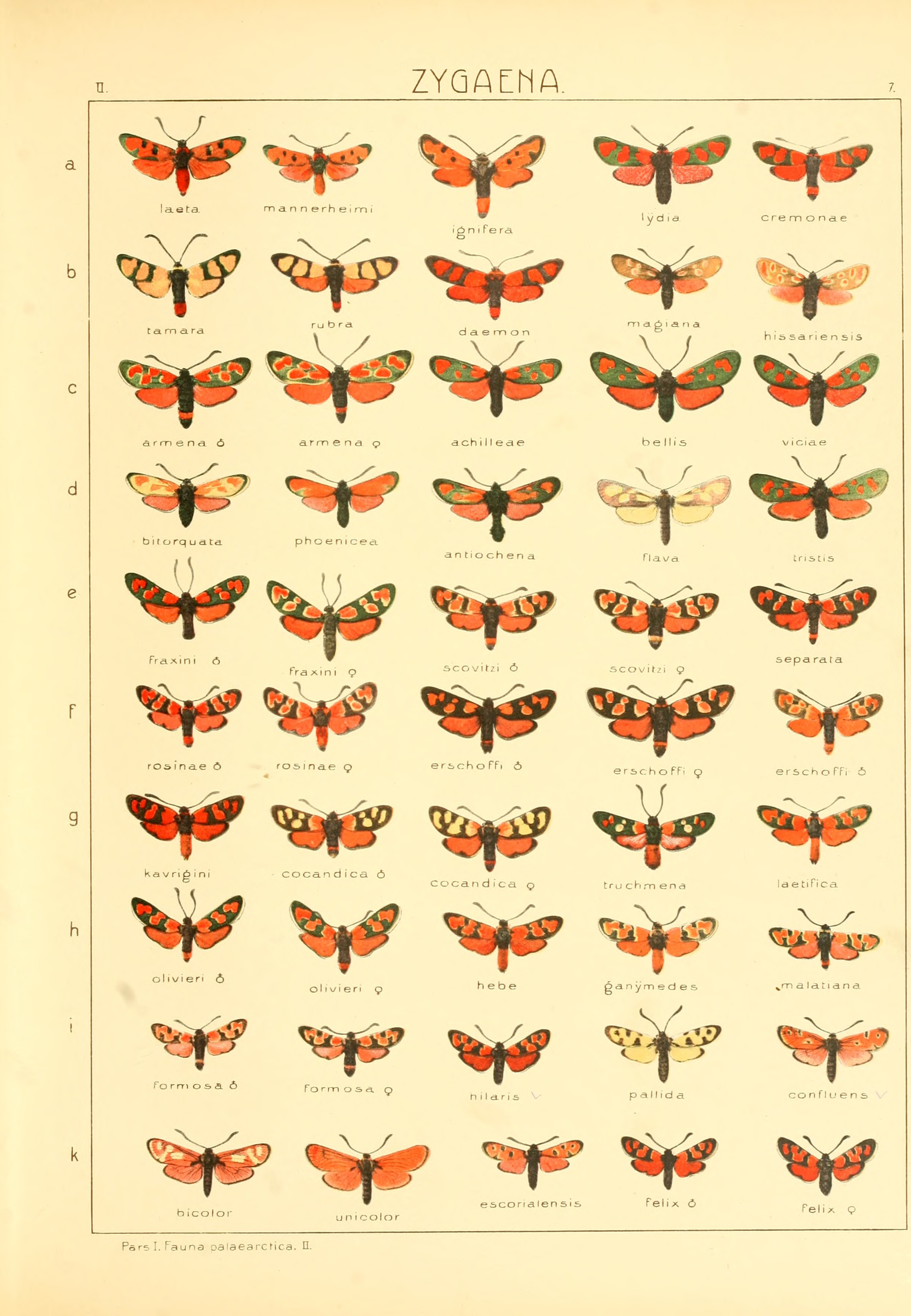
- Zygaena rosinae in Seitz f

Scientific classification
- Domain: Eukaryota
- Kingdom: Animalia
- Phylum: Arthropoda
- Class: Insecta
- Order: Lepidoptera
- Family: Zygaenidae
- Genus: Zygaena
- Species: Z. rosinae

Binomial name
- Zygaena rosinae Korb, 1903

= Zygaena rosinae =

Species of moth

Zygaena rosinae is a species of moth in the Zygaenidae family. It is found in Armenia. Z. rosinae Korb (7f), from Armenia, resembles scovitzii but the palpi and nearly the whole abdomen, especially in the female are bright red.
