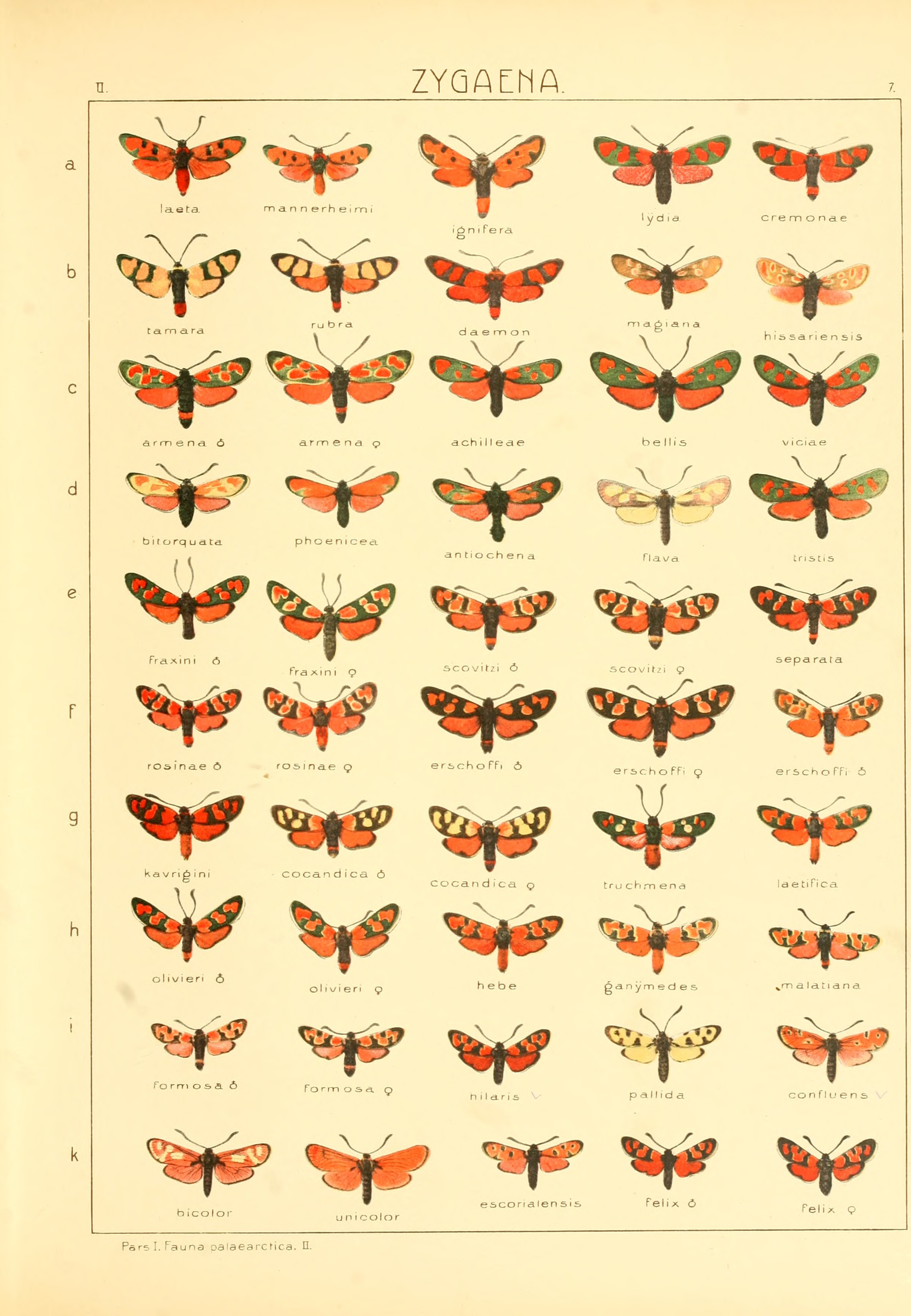
- In Seitz Die Gross-Schmetterlinge der Erde (The Macrolepidoptera of the World) (7e)

Scientific classification
- Domain: Eukaryota
- Kingdom: Animalia
- Phylum: Arthropoda
- Class: Insecta
- Order: Lepidoptera
- Family: Zygaenidae
- Genus: Zygaena
- Species: Z. separata

Binomial name
- Zygaena separata Staudinger, 1887

= Zygaena separata =

Species of moth

Zygaena separata is a species of moth in the Zygaenidae family. It is found in Southern Fergana (Uzbekistan). Zygaena separata was described as ab. separata Stgr. of fraxini. It differs in that the distal spots are narrowly but distinctly separated from one another.
