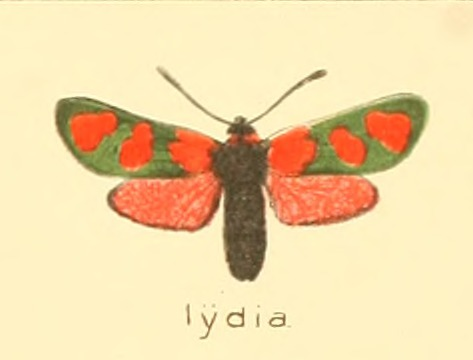
- In Die Gross-Schmetterlinge der Erde (The Macrolepidoptera of the World)

Scientific classification
- Domain: Eukaryota
- Kingdom: Animalia
- Phylum: Arthropoda
- Class: Insecta
- Order: Lepidoptera
- Family: Zygaenidae
- Genus: Zygaena
- Species: Z. lydia

Binomial name
- Zygaena lydia Staudinger, 1887

= Zygaena lydia =

Species of moth

Zygaena lydia is a species of moth in the Zygaenidae family. It is found in Kurdistan and Kherson Oblast.

In Seitz (1913):

Z. lydia Stgr. (7 a) reminds one in pattern already of the following species, [achilleae], but the wings are densely scaled and the dark ground-colour of the forewing has a strong metallic gloss; the intensely deep red collar is a further characteristic. From Tauria and Kurdistan. — The very similar cremonae Stgr. (7 a), from the Libanon, has in addition to the red collar a red abdominal belt, the distal patch of the forewing being occasionally somewhat constricted in the centre. In lydia as well as cremonae the very bright scarlet spots of the forewing are united in pairs.

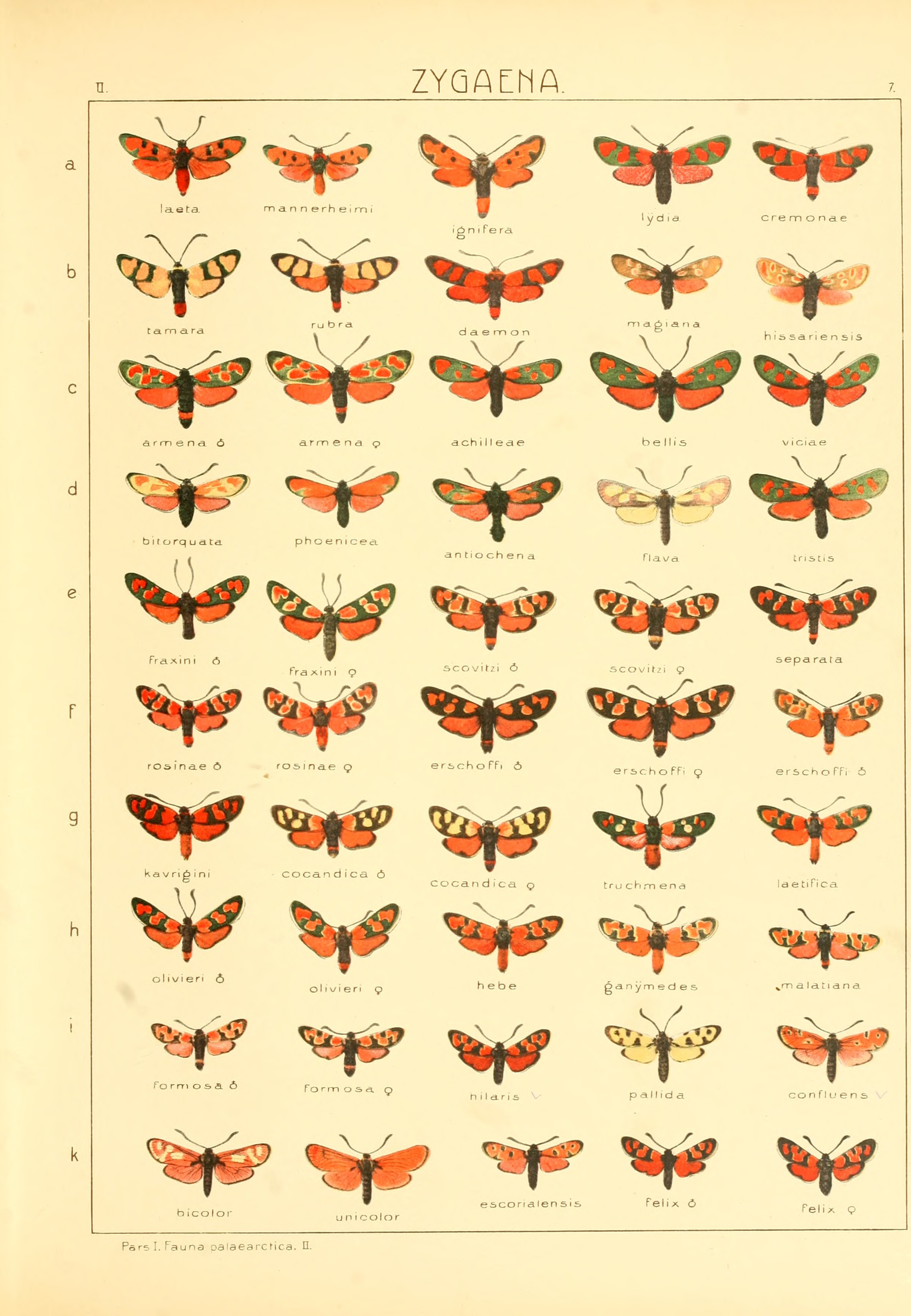
In Die Gross-Schmetterlinge der Erde (The Macrolepidoptera of the World)
