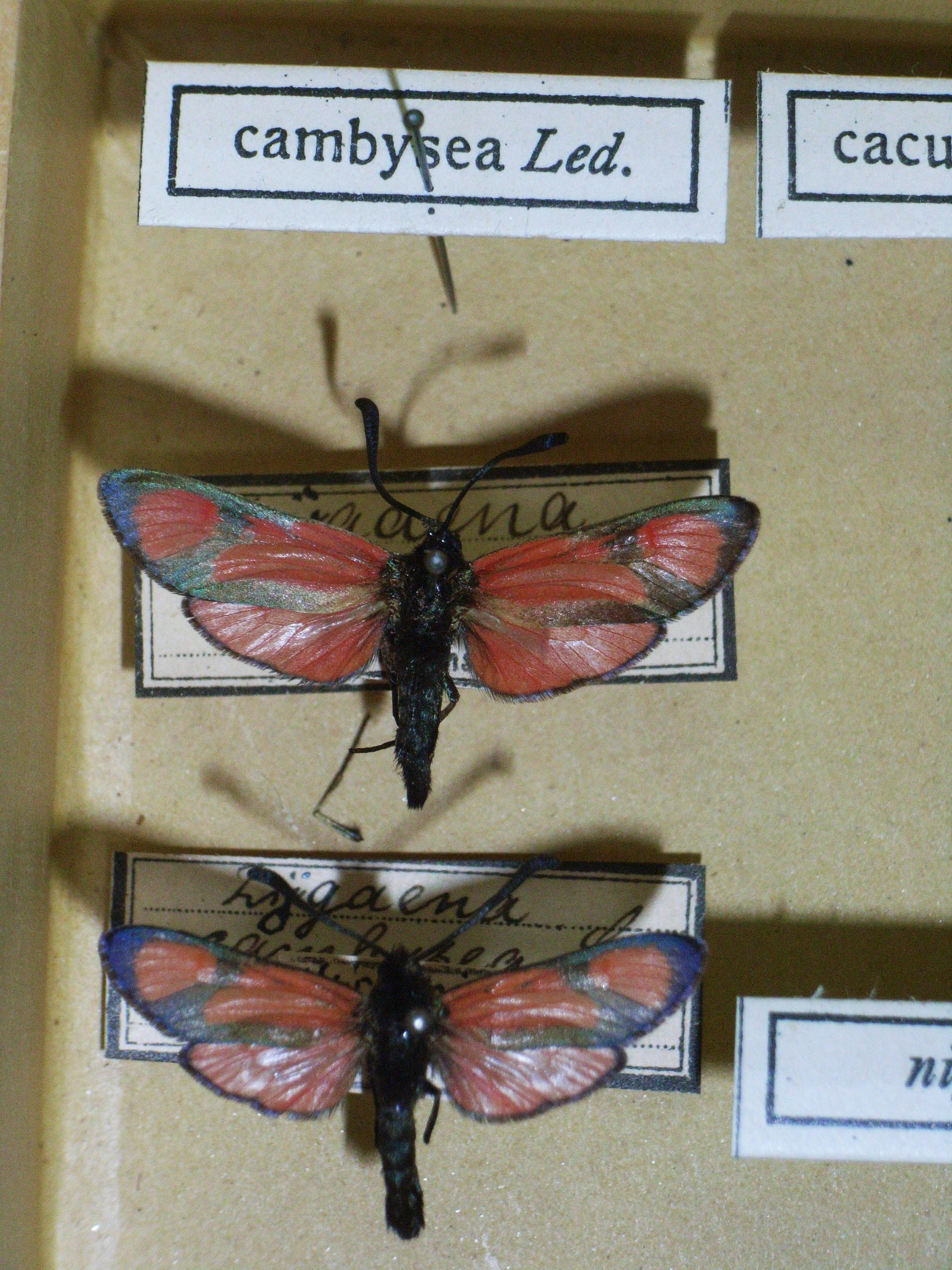

Scientific classification
- Domain: Eukaryota
- Kingdom: Animalia
- Phylum: Arthropoda
- Class: Insecta
- Order: Lepidoptera
- Family: Zygaenidae
- Genus: Zygaena
- Species: Z. cambysea

Binomial name
- Zygaena cambysea Lederer, 1870

= Zygaena cambysea =

Species of moth

Zygaena cambysea is a moth of the family Zygaenidae. It is found in the Middle East, including Iran. It is rosy-red like cuvieri, but differs in the body being entirely black, without red collar and belt. In the form rosacea Rom. from Armenia the spots of the forewing are so merged that the wings appear almost evenly carmine.

== Subspecies ==
- Zygaena cambysea cambysea (Iran)
- Zygaena cambysea kamarana
- Zygaena cambysea hafis Reiss, 1938 (Iran)
