= Zygaena haematina =

Scientific classification
- Kingdom: Animalia
- Phylum: Arthropoda
- Class: Insecta
- Order: Lepidoptera
- Family: Zygaenidae
- Genus: Zygaena
- Species: Z. haematina

Binomial name
- Zygaena haematina Kollar, 1849

Species of moth

Zygaena haematina is a species of moth in the Zygaenidae family. It is found in Iran.

Z. haematina approaches Zygaena fraxini, but is much smaller and more narrow-winged, spot 4 is more rounded and there is a red collar, which is absent from fraxini. Rebel considers haematina a distinct species from an examination of the type contained in the Hofmuseum at Vienna: from Persia.
