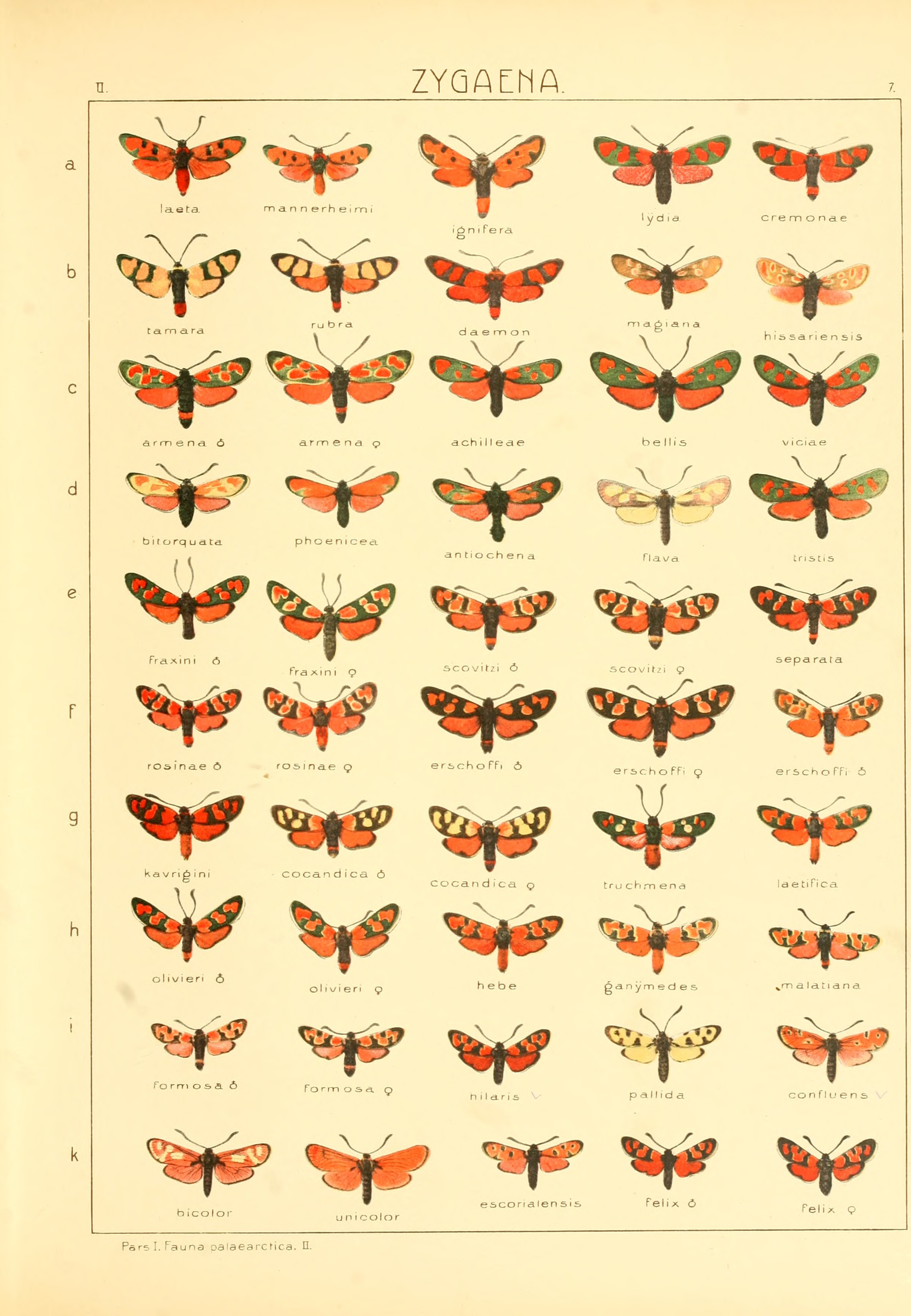
- Zygaena formosa formasa and ssp. malatiana in Seitz h, i

Scientific classification
- Domain: Eukaryota
- Kingdom: Animalia
- Phylum: Arthropoda
- Class: Insecta
- Order: Lepidoptera
- Family: Zygaenidae
- Genus: Zygaena
- Species: Z. formosa

Binomial name
- Zygaena formosa Herrich-Schäffer, 1852

= Zygaena formosa =

Species of moth

Zygaena formosa is a species of moth in the Zygaenidae family. It is found in Asia minor, Syria and Turkey.In Seitz it is described. — The colour of the wings of the much smaller [than the similar Zygaena olivieri group ] formosa H.-Sch. (7i), from Asia Minor and Syria, is far lighter pale rosy, the abdomen, however, being black except a narrow belt. — In malatiana Stgr. ( i. 1.) [now Zygaena formosa ssp. malatiana Rebel, 1901 ] (7h) this belt is broader, comprising the 2—3 penultimate segments; Malatia, east of the Antitaurus.
