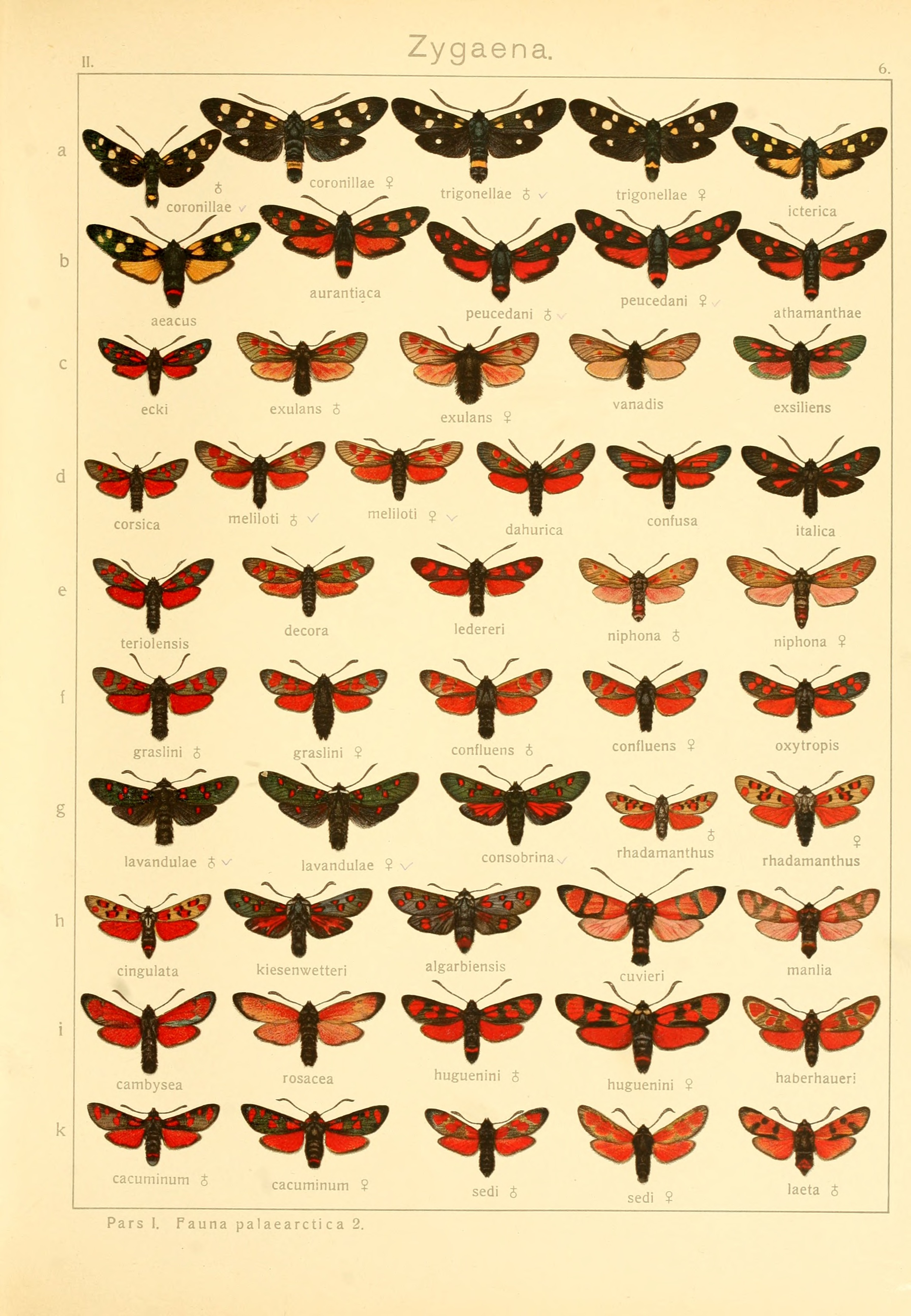
- Zygaena manlia in Seitz h
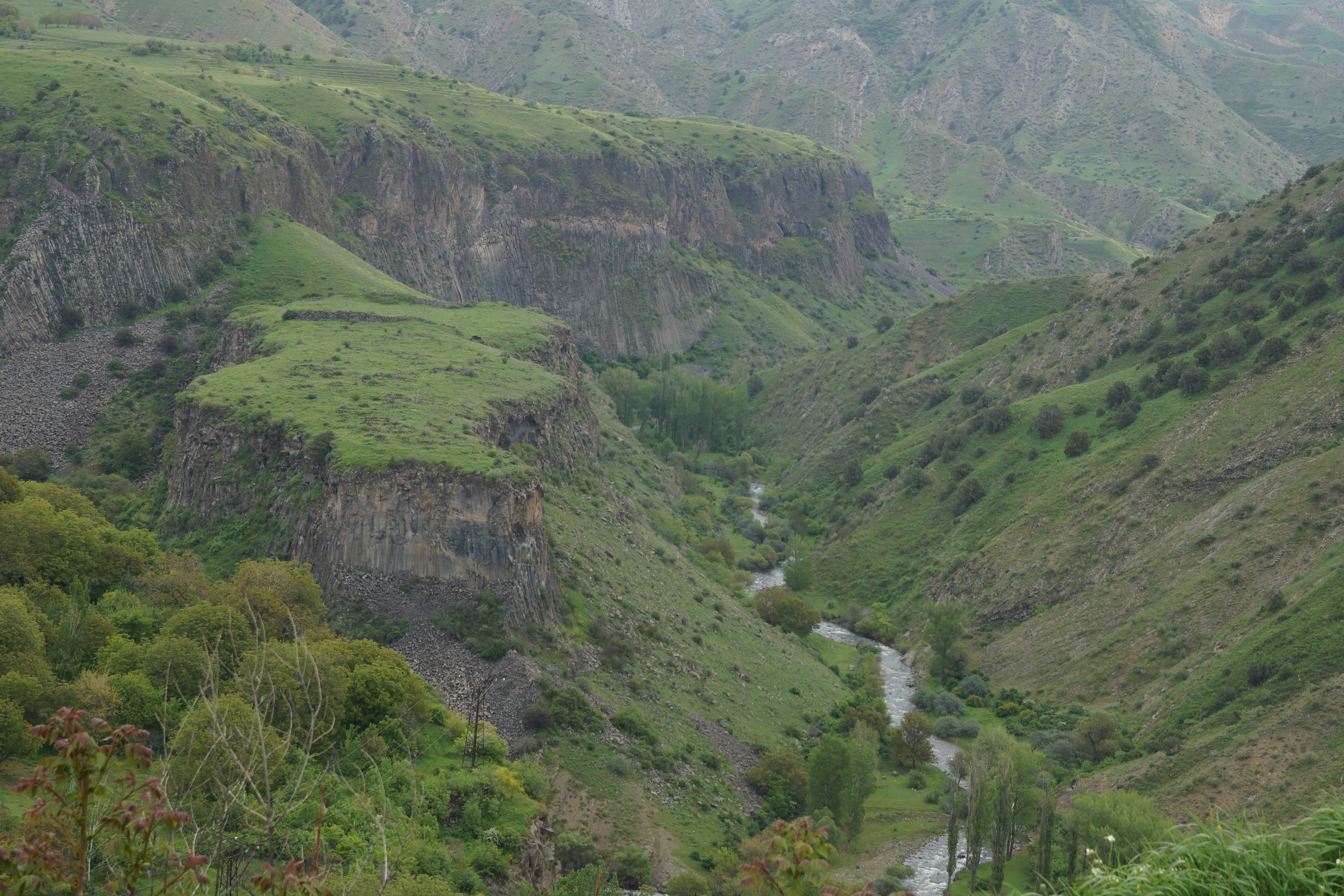
- Habitat. Armenia.

Scientific classification
- Domain: Eukaryota
- Kingdom: Animalia
- Phylum: Arthropoda
- Class: Insecta
- Order: Lepidoptera
- Family: Zygaenidae
- Genus: Zygaena
- Species: Z. manlia

Binomial name
- Zygaena manlia Lederer, 1870

= Zygaena manlia =

Species of moth

Zygaena manlia is a species of moth in the Zygaenidae family. It is found in Armenia, Turkey and Iran.In Seitz it is described as - "Similar to Zygaena cuvieri and with an equally broad rosy red collar and abdominal belt, but the blackish bands separating the red areas of the forewing are much broader, the distal area being represented by an irregular half-divided patch. North Persia"
