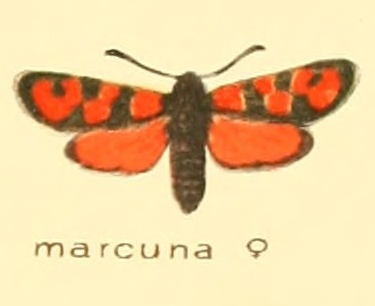
- Female
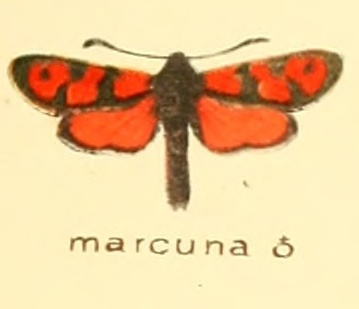
- Male

Scientific classification
- Kingdom: Animalia
- Phylum: Arthropoda
- Class: Insecta
- Order: Lepidoptera
- Family: Zygaenidae
- Genus: Zygaena
- Species: Z. marcuna

Binomial name
- Zygaena marcuna Oberthür, 1888

Synonyms
- Zygaena maroccana tingitana Reis, 1937

= Zygaena marcuna =

Species of moth

Zygaena marcuna is a species of moth in the Zygaenidae family. It is found in Morocco, Algeria and Tunisia. It is dull red or dark pink. The black dot situated in the distal area touches the black costal margin, and the red basal area is separated from the red discal area by a heavy black band. It was described from the Aures Mountains from specimens found in May.The larval host plants are Ononis natrix and Ononis repens. Imagines fly in May and June.

== Subspecies ==
- Zygaena marcuna marcuna
- Zygaena marcuna ahmarica Reiss, 1944
- Zygaena marcuna delicioli Wiegel, 1973
- Zygaena marcuna numidia Hofmann, G. Reiss & Tremewan, 1994
- Zygaena marcuna tingitana Reiss, 1937
- Zygaena marcuna tlemceni Slaby, 1974
