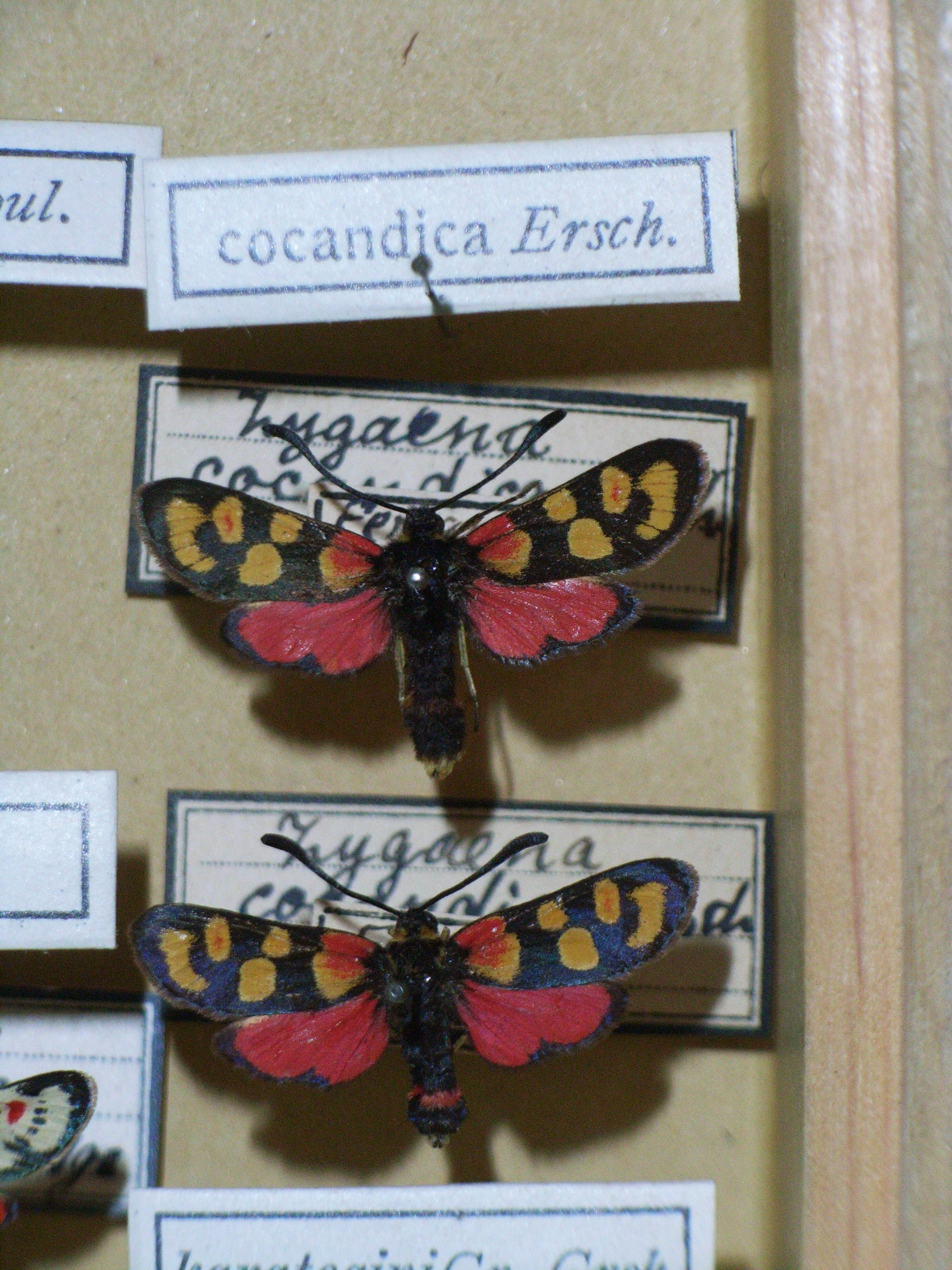

Scientific classification
- Domain: Eukaryota
- Kingdom: Animalia
- Phylum: Arthropoda
- Class: Insecta
- Order: Lepidoptera
- Family: Zygaenidae
- Genus: Zygaena
- Species: Z. cocandica

Binomial name
- Zygaena cocandica Erschoff, 1874

= Zygaena cocandica =

Species of moth

Zygaena cocandica is a moth of the family Zygaenidae. It is found in Uzbekistan, Tajikistan and Kyrgyzstan. In Seitz it is described as "A very remarkable form with yellow spots on the forewing, only the basal ones being shaded with red, it has sometimes an entirely red abdomen ab.karategini Gr.-Grsh., from Buchara" Also in Seitz as erschoffi Stgr. it is described as having "spots 5 and 6 often widely separate, standing side by side rather than one below the other; collar and 1-2 abdominal segments red, sometimes also the shoulders, as in our last figure: Pamir". The length of the forewings is about 12 mm.

== Subspecies ==
- Zygaena cocandica cocandica (southern Kyrgyzstan)
- Zygaena cocandica minor
- Zygaena cocandica hafiza (Tajikistan)
