= Zygaena escalerai =

Scientific classification
- Kingdom: Animalia
- Phylum: Arthropoda
- Clade: Pancrustacea
- Class: Insecta
- Order: Lepidoptera
- Family: Zygaenidae
- Genus: Zygaena
- Species: Z. escalerai

Binomial name
- Zygaena escalerai Poujade, 1900

Species of moth

Zygaena escalerai is a species of moth in the Zygaenidae family. It is found in Iran. In Seitz it is described - Z. escalerai Pouj. has orange spots on forewing, the external pairs being confluent; spot 6 is elongate and transverse. The hindwing is orange, with a vermilion tint, the disc being hyaline and the apex black, there being a black dot situated at centre of distal margin. The species has been discovered in Persia, the type contained in the Paris Museum being caught by Escalera [Manuel Martínez de la Escalera] in July. According to the description this form is allied to the fraxini-truchmena group.
