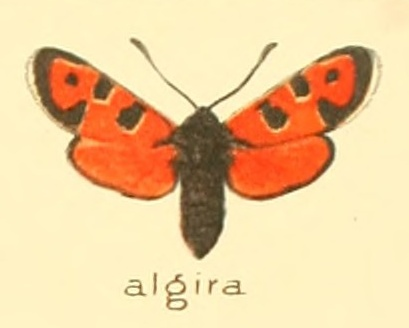

Scientific classification
- Domain: Eukaryota
- Kingdom: Animalia
- Phylum: Arthropoda
- Class: Insecta
- Order: Lepidoptera
- Family: Zygaenidae
- Genus: Zygaena
- Species: Z. algira

Binomial name
- Zygaena algira Boisduval, 1834

Synonyms
- Zygaena bachagha Oberthür, 1916; Zygaena oreodoxa Marten, 1944; Zygaena bornefeldii Burgeff & Reiss, 1973

= Zygaena algira =

Species of moth

Zygaena algira is a species of moth in the Zygaenidae family. It is found in Morocco, Algeria and Tunisia.

The larvae feed on Coronilla juncea.

== Subspecies ==
- Zygaena algira algira
- Zygaena algira ifranica Hofmann & G. Reiss, 1981
- Zygaena algira kebirica Reiss, 1944
- Zygaena algira leucopoda Dujardin, 1973
- Zygaena algira telealgira Dujardin, 1973
