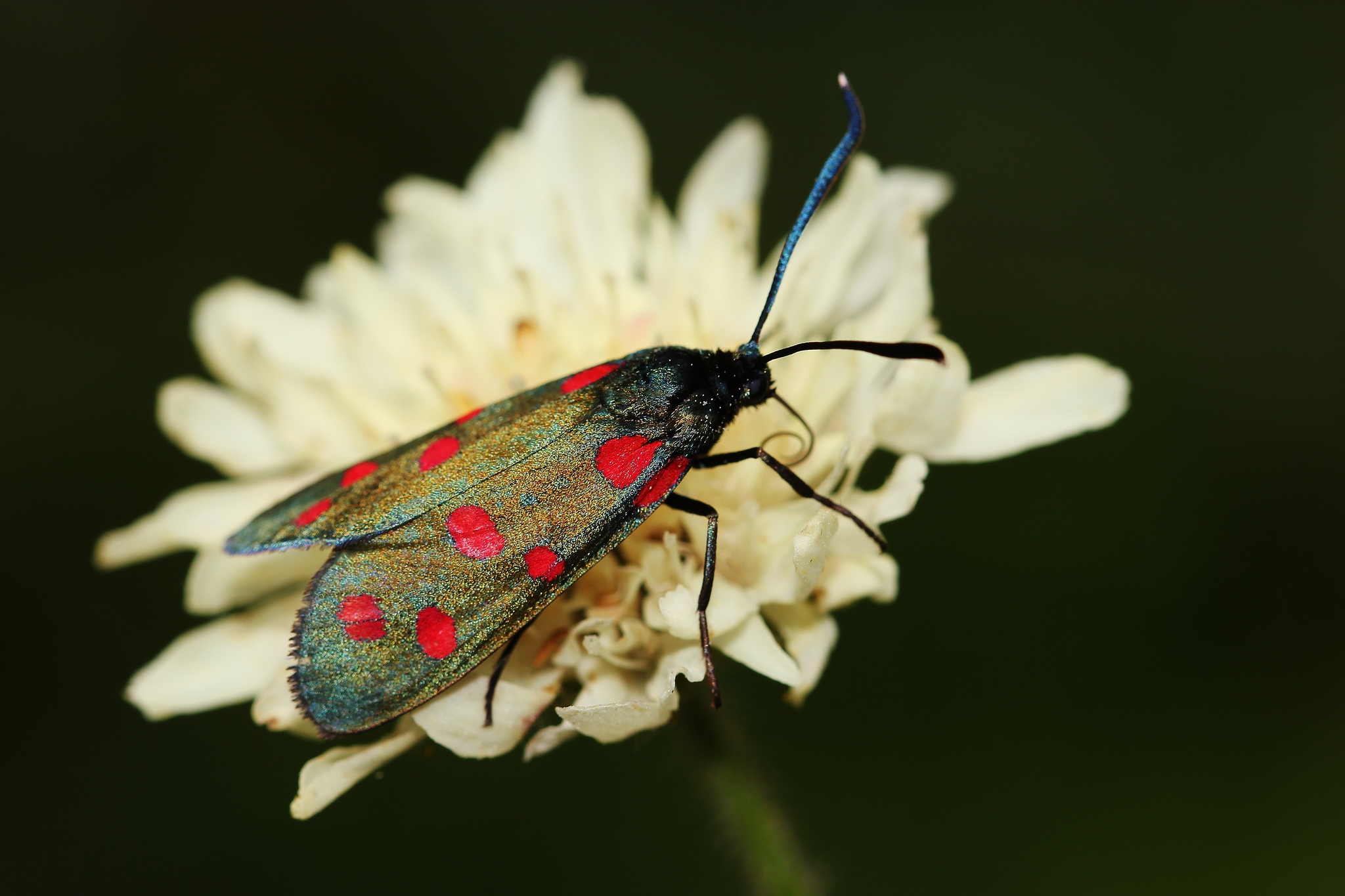
- Zygaena dorycnii on a flower

Scientific classification
- Domain: Eukaryota
- Kingdom: Animalia
- Phylum: Arthropoda
- Class: Insecta
- Order: Lepidoptera
- Family: Zygaenidae
- Genus: Zygaena
- Species: Z. dorycnii

Binomial name
- Zygaena dorycnii Ochsenheimer, 1808

Synonyms
- Anthrocera kertshensis Obraztsov, 1935; Zygaena ephialtes v. araratica Staudinger, 1871; Zygaena korbiana Reiss, 1935; Zygaena grusica Reiss, 1936; Zygaena hasankifensis Reiss, 1938

= Zygaena dorycnii =

Species of moth

Zygaena dorycnii is a species of moth in the family Zygaenidae. It is found in Ukraine, Russia, Turkey and Armenia.

It has spots and a red belt, which does not reach all round the abdomen as in the otherwise similar peucedani, not being continued on the underside. — In senescens Stgr. [ now Zygaena ephialtes ssp. senescens Staudinger, 1887 ], from Tauria, the anterior basal spot of the forewing, the hindwing and the abdominal belt are dark rose-colour, the other spots of the forewing being white, with a yellow tint.

The larvae feed on Lotus corniculatus.

== Subspecies ==
- Zygaena dorycnii dorycnii
- Zygaena dorycnii karabaghensis Holik & Sheljuzhko, 1958
- Zygaena dorycnii keredjensis Reiss, 1937
- Zygaena dorycnii kertshensis (Obraztsov, 1935)
- Zygaena dorycnii kubana Holik & Sheljuzhko, 1958
- Zygaena dorycnii teberdensis Reiss, 1936
