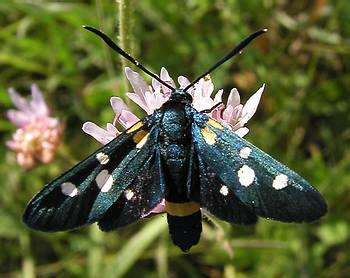
- Zygaena ephialtes

Scientific classification
- Kingdom: Animalia
- Phylum: Arthropoda
- Clade: Pancrustacea
- Class: Insecta
- Order: Lepidoptera
- Family: Zygaenidae
- Subfamily: Zygaeninae
- Genus: Zygaena; Fabricius, 1775

Synonyms
- List: * Anthrocera Scopoli, 1777; Hesychia Hübner, [1819]; Agrumenia Hübner, [1819]; Eutychia Hübner, [1819]; Anthilaria Hübner, [1819]; Aeacis Hübner, [1819]; Thermophila Hübner, [1819]; Lycastes Hübner, [1819]; Mesembrynus Hübner, [1819]; Silvicola Burgeff, 1926; Hyala Burgeff, 1926; Santolinophaga Burgeff, 1926; Peucedanophila Burgeff, 1926; Lictoria Burgeff, 1926; Peristygia Burgeff, 1926; Coelestis Burgeff, 1926; Polymorpha Burgeff, 1926; Yasumatsuia Strand, 1936; Bizankoia Strand, 1936; Argumenoidea Holik, 1937; Cirsiphaga Holik, 1953; Coelestina Holik, 1953; Libania Holik & Sheljuzhko, 1956; Usgenta Holik & Sheljuzhko, 1956; Huebneriana Holik & Sheljuzhko, 1957; Burgeffia Holik & Sheljuzhko, 1958; Mesembrynoidea Holik & Sheljuzhko, 1958; Epizygaena Jordan, [1907]

= Zygaena =

Genus of moths

Zygaena is a genus of moths in the family Zygaenidae. These brightly coloured, day-flying moths are native to the West Palearctic.

== Description ==
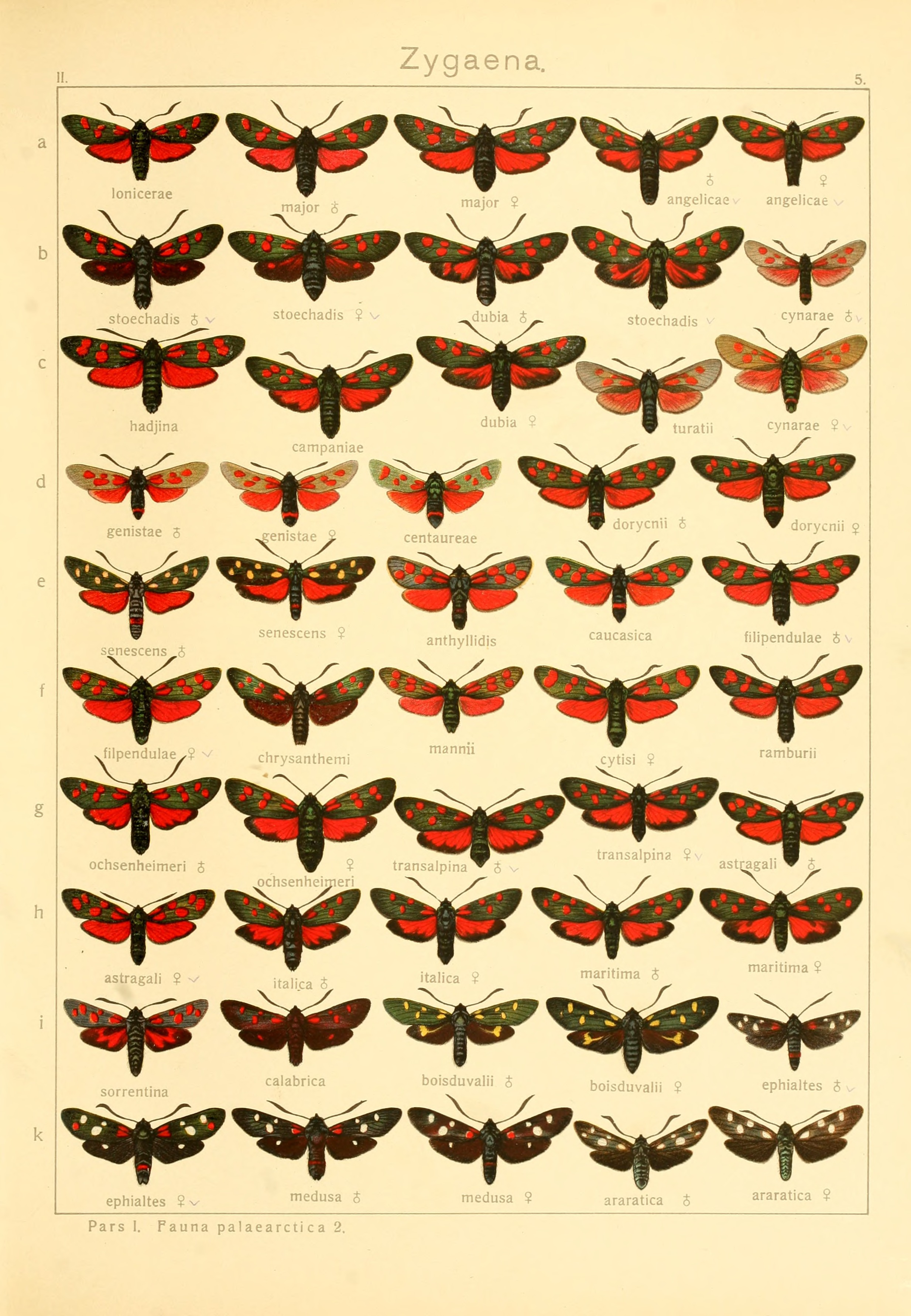
Illustration of Zygaena species from Die Großschmetterlinge der Erde (The Macrolepidoptera of the World)

Wing morphology of 12 Zygaena species

These moths are medium-sized and stocky. The antennae are club-shaped and finely serrated. The forewings have a black background, usually with a metallic sheen, and are spotted with red, yellow, or white. Their venation is characterized by the presence of five radial veins, with the third and fourth emerging from a common stem. The hindwings are red or yellow with a black border, or black with a central spot. The fringes of both wing pairs are usually black, less often grey or yellowish-white. The venation of this pair is characterized by the independent first and second cubital veins. The male genitalia are characterized by ovoid, rounded valves with a well-developed corona and lacking a sacculus. The uncus consists of paired, relatively weakly sclerotized, conical, and hairy appendages. The numerous spines on the aedeagus are located primarily on the dorsal and ventral plates. Females have a long eighth abdominal tergite, a short-lipped ovipositor, and the anterior gonapophyses are longer than the posterior ones. The copulatory pouch may be equipped with a variably developed stigma (signum) or this may be absent.

Adalbert Seitz described them thus:

"Small, stout, black insects, sometimes with metallic gloss. Antenna very strongly developed; the club being considerably incrassate distally. Tongue long and strong. Legs rather short. Forewing elongate oval, black or red, rarely spotted with white or yellow. Hindwing small, usually red, seldom black. —Larva strongly humpbacked, very soft, downy-haired. Pupa in a paper-like silky cocoon, the sheaths of legs and wings being loosely soldered together. The moths are mostly local, their stations being often restricted to a mountain, a meadow, etc. They appear mostly in large numbers at their special localities, swarming about flowers, which they suck, for instance Scabious, Thistles, Eryngium, etc., their flight being slow and straight on. The body of these insects contains, as in the other Zygaenids, a yellow, acrid, oily liquid which renders them nauseous, protecting them not only against their enemies among the vertebrates, but apparently even against predatory insects, for instance Asilidae. Like all insects protected by the body-juices, they are extremely tenacious of life, enduring considerable wounds as well as resisting strong poison for some time (cyanide of potassium). They conceal themselves in no way, mostly resting conspicuously on stalks or sprigs, hardly taking to the wing when touched, so that one can often pick them off by the long antennae. The latter are not concealed beneath the wings when at rest, as in other Heterocera, but are held straight forward. The main locality for the genus are the Mediterranean coast districts, of Europe as well as of the Atlas countries and the Levant where the Zygaenae occur in a great abundance of forms, which partly intergrade and are found in immense numbers of specimens. There are often several individuals of different species on a flower, which easily explains that hybridisation obtains here more often than in any other group of Lepidoptera. However, such copulations appear to be mostly without result. The Zygaenae are best killed by injection of some strong tobacco juice With the help of the hollow needle of a morphia syringe.As in all protected Lepidoptera the specifically distinct forms are without exception very common at their localities, the commercial value depending solely on the accessibleness of these places. The number of species is largest in South Europe, North Africa and Asia Minor [including the Iranian plateau ], thence decreasing rapidly in all directions but extending into the Punjab and the Nepalese valleys of the Himalayas and into Western Siberia. The species are on the whole very similar to one another and also very constant, varying only in certain directions. There occur of nearly all species individuals for instance with yellow instead of red markings. The normally six-spotted species may exceptionally have five spots, and inversely. In species which bear a red belt the latter may sometimes be absent, and in non-belted forms the belt may appear in rare cases. The spots of the forewing may be edged with white and merged. Lastly, the marginal band of the hindwing may be so widened as to more or less displace the red ground-colour. These various aberrations have in may cases received names.

== Species ==
Subgenus Mesembrynus Hübner, [1819]

- manlia-group
  - Zygaena seitzi Reiss, 1938 Zagros Mountains, Iran
  - Zygaena nocturna Ebert, 1974 Ardakan, Iran
  - Zygaena kermanensis Tremewan, 1975 Iran
  - Zygaena turkmenica Reiss, 1933 Kopet Dag
  - Zygaena cacuminum Christoph, 1877
  - Zygaena speciosa Reiss, 1937 Alborz Mountains
  - Zygaena cuvieri Boisduval, [1828]
  - Zygaena tamara Christoph, 1889
  - Zygaena manlia Lederer, 1870
  - Zygaena araxis Koch, M. 1936 Ordubad Azerbaijan
  - Zygaena fredi Reiss, 1938 South Iran
  - Zygaena mirzayansi Hofmann, A. & Keil, T. 2010 Zagros Mountains, Iran
  - Zygaena rubricollis Hampson, 1900 Chitral, India
  - Zygaena hindukuschi Koch, M. 1937 Afghanistan
  - Zygaena halima Naumann, 1977 Afghanistan
  - Zygaena wyatti Reiss & Schulte, 1961 Afghanistan
  - Zygaena aisha Naumann, & Naumann, 1980 Kerman, Iran
  - Zygaena ginnereissi Hofmann, A. 2000 Iran
  - Zygaena haematina Kollar, 1849
  - Zygaena fusca Hofmann, 2000 Iran
  - Zygaena lydia Staudinger, 1887
- purpuralis-group
  - Zygaena brizae (Esper, 1800)
  - Zygaena rubicundus (Hübner, [1817])
  - Zygaena cambysea Lederer, 1870
  - Zygaena erythrus (Hübner, [1806])
  - Zygaena minos ([Denis & Schiffermüller], 1775)
  - Zygaena pseudorubicundus Klír & Naumann, 2002 Iran
  - Zygaena purpuralis (Brünnich, 1763)
  - Zygaena alpherakyi Sheljuzhko, 1936 Caucasus
- graslini-group
  - Zygaena graslini Lederer, 1855
- cynarae-group
  - Zygaena cynarae (Esper, 1789)
- centaureae-group
  - Zygaena centaureae Fischer von Waldheim, 1832
  - Zygaena laeta (Hübner, 1790)
  - Zygaena huguenini Staudinger, 1887
- corsica-group
  - Zygaena corsica Boisduval, [1828]
- zuleima-group
  - Zygaena zuleima Pierret, 1837
- favonia-group
  - Zygaena loyselis Oberthür, 1876
  - Zygaena favonia Freyer, 1844
  - Zygaena aurata Blachier, 1905
  - Zygaena sarpedon (Hübner, 1790)
  - Zygaena contaminei Boisduval, 1834
  - Zygaena punctum Ochsenheimer, 1808

Subgenus Agrumenia Hübner, [1819]

- fausta-group
  - Zygaena excelsa Rothschild, 1917 Morocco, Algeria
  - Zygaena tremewani Hofmann & Reiss, 1983 Tunisia
  - Zygaena alluaudi Oberthür, C. 1922 Morocco
  - Zygaena algira Boisduval, 1834
  - Zygaena fausta (Linnaeus, 1767)
- hilaris-group
  - Zygaena youngi Rothschild, 1925 Morocco
  - Zygaena maroccana Rothschild, 1917 Morocco
  - Zygaena marcuna Oberthür, 1888
  - Zygaena hilaris Ochsenheimer, 1808
- cocandica-group
  - Zygaena kavrigini Grum-Grshimailo, 1887
  - Zygaena truchmena Eversmann, 1854
  - Zygaena esseni Blom, 1973 Iran
  - Zygaena transpamirini Koch, M 1936 Chitral, Hindu Kush North India, Afghanistan.
  - Zygaena magiana Staudinger, 1889
  - Zygaena cocandica Erschoff, 1874
  - Zygaena pamira Sheljuzhko, 1919 Pamirs, Tajikistan, Afghanistan
  - Zygaena sogdiana Erschoff, 1874
  - Zygaena storaiae Naumann, 1974 Afghanistan
- olivieri-group
  - Zygaena ferganae Sheljuzhko, 1941
  - Zygaena chirazica Reiss, 1938 Iran
  - Zygaena naumanni Hille, A. & Keil, T. 2000 Iran
  - Zygaena tenhagenova Hofmann, 2005 Iran
  - Zygaena haberhaueri Lederer, 1870
  - Zygaena olivieri Boisduval, [1828]
  - Zygaena sedi Fabricius, 1787
- fraxini-group
  - Zygaena separata Staudinger, 1887
  - Zygaena rosinae Korb, 1903
  - Zygaena bakhtiyari Hofmann & Tremewan, 2005 Iran
  - Zygaena sengana Holik & Sheljuzhko, 1956 Iran
  - Zygaena fraxini Ménétriés, 1832
  - Zygaena escalerai Poujade, 1900
  - Zygaena formosa Herrich-Schäffer, 1852
  - Zygaena peschmerga Eckweiler & Görgner, 1981 S.E. Turkey
  - Zygaena afghana Moore, [1860]
- felix-group
  - Zygaena johannae Le Cerf, 1923 Morocco
  - Zygaena felix Oberthür, 1876
  - Zygaena beatrix Przegendza, 1932 Algeria, Morocco
- orana-group
  - Zygaena orana Duponchel, 1835
- carniolica-group
  - Zygaena carniolica (Scopoli, 1763)
  - Zygaena occitanica (Villers, 1789)
- exulans-group
  - Zygaena exulans – mountain burnet (Hohenwarth, 1792)
- viciae-group
  - Zygaena viciae – New Forest burnet ([Denis & Schiffermüller], 1775)
  - Zygaena niphona Butler, 1877
- loti-group
  - Zygaena christa Reiss & Schulte, 1967 Iran
  - Zygaena loti ([Denis & Schiffermüller], 1775)
  - Zygaena armena Eversmann, 1851 Georgia, Caucasus
  - Zygaena ecki Christoph, 1882
  - Zygaena ignifera Korb, 1897

Subgenus Zygaena Fabricius, 1775

- anthyllidis-group
  - Zygaena anthyllidis Boisduval, [1828]
- lavandulae-group
  - Zygaena lavandulae (Esper, 1783)
  - Zygaena theryi de Joannis, 1908 Algeria
- rhadamanthus-group
  - Zygaena rhadamanthus (Esper, [1789])
  - Zygaena oxytropis Boisduval, [1828]
  - Zygaena problematica Naumann, 1966 Turkey
- persephone-group
  - Zygaena persephone Zerny, Hans 1934 High Atlas, Morocco
- nevadensis-group
  - Zygaena mana (Kirby, 1892)
  - Zygaena nevadensis Rambur, 1858
  - Zygaena romeo Duponchel, 1835
  - Zygaena osterodensis Reiss, 1921
- transalpina-group
  - Zygaena dorycnii Ochsenheimer, 1808
  - Zygaena ephialtes (Linnaeus, 1767)
  - Zygaena transalpina (Esper, 1780)
  - Zygaena angelicae Ochsenheimer, 1808
- filipendulae-group
  - Zygaena filipendulae (Linnaeus, 1758) – six-spotted burnet
  - Zygaena lonicerae (Scheven, 1777) – narrow-bordered five-spot burnet
  - Zygaena trifolii (Esper, 1783) – five-spot burnet
