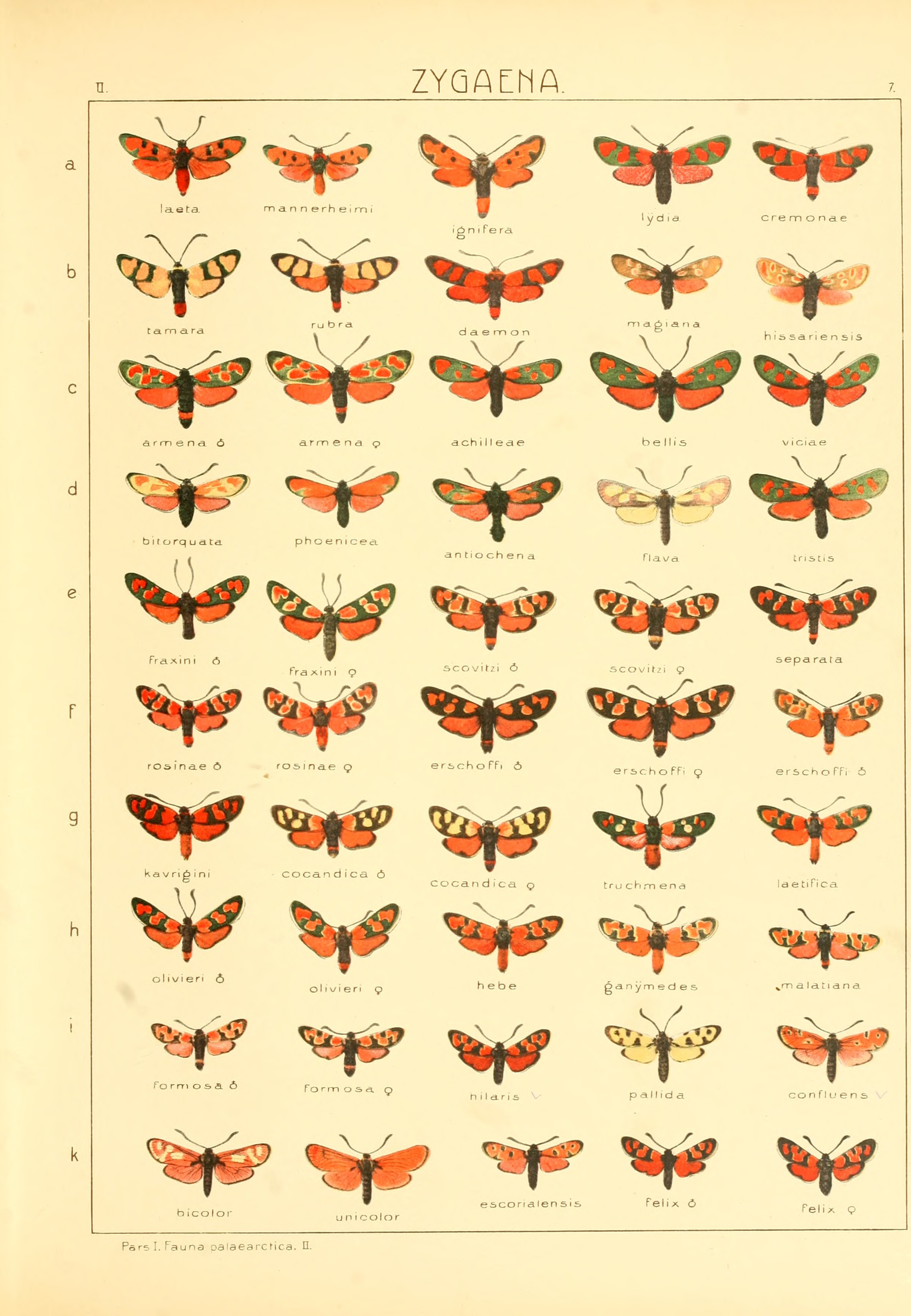
- Zygaena tamara in Seitz b

Scientific classification
- Kingdom: Animalia
- Phylum: Arthropoda
- Clade: Pancrustacea
- Class: Insecta
- Order: Lepidoptera
- Family: Zygaenidae
- Genus: Zygaena
- Species: Z. tamara

Binomial name
- Zygaena tamara Christoph, 1889

= Zygaena tamara =

Species of moth

Zygaena tamara is a species of moth in the family Zygaenidae. It is found in Zangazur-Daralayaz (Azerbaijan)

== Description ==
In Seitz it is described - Z. tamara Christ. (7b) . One of the finest Zygaenae. All the wings bright yellow, with a delicate rosy tint, the distal margin being black; forewing divided by 2 black transverse bands into 3 areas of nearly equal size. Antenna exceedingly long and strong, the abdomen being broadly belted with red. — ab. rubra Bang-Haas i. l. (7b) the hindwing is rosy red instead of yellow, while in the form daemon Christ. (7 b) the fore- and hindwing are red. All 3 forms occur together in Armenia, but are found only in limited districts.

== Biology ==
The larval foodplants are Eryngium billardieri, Eryngium giganteum, Prangos sp. and Ferula haussknechtii

== Subspecies ==
- Z. t. tamara
- Z. t. mahabadica Reiss, 1978
- Z. t. kerendica Reiss, 1978
- Z. t. bijarica (Reiss, 1978)
