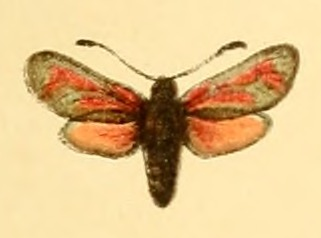
- In Die Gross-Schmetterlinge der Erde (The Macrolepidoptera of the World)

Scientific classification
- Domain: Eukaryota
- Kingdom: Animalia
- Phylum: Arthropoda
- Class: Insecta
- Order: Lepidoptera
- Family: Zygaenidae
- Genus: Zygaena
- Species: Z. zuleima

Binomial name
- Zygaena zuleima Pierret, 1837

= Zygaena zuleima =

Species of moth

Zygaena zuleima is a species of moth in the Zygaenidae family. It is found in the Atlas Mountains (in Morocco, Algeria, and Tunisia).

In Seitz (1913):

Z. zuleima Pier. (=ludicra Luc) (4d). A small, delicate insect with an almost naked body. The wedge-spots are narrow, being separated by broad black interspaces; the external streak angulate, hooklike, being extended close to distal margin. — In Algiers, on meadows, in spring till early .May not rarely on Umbelliferae, for instance near Oran, on the parade-grounds of Constantine, etc.

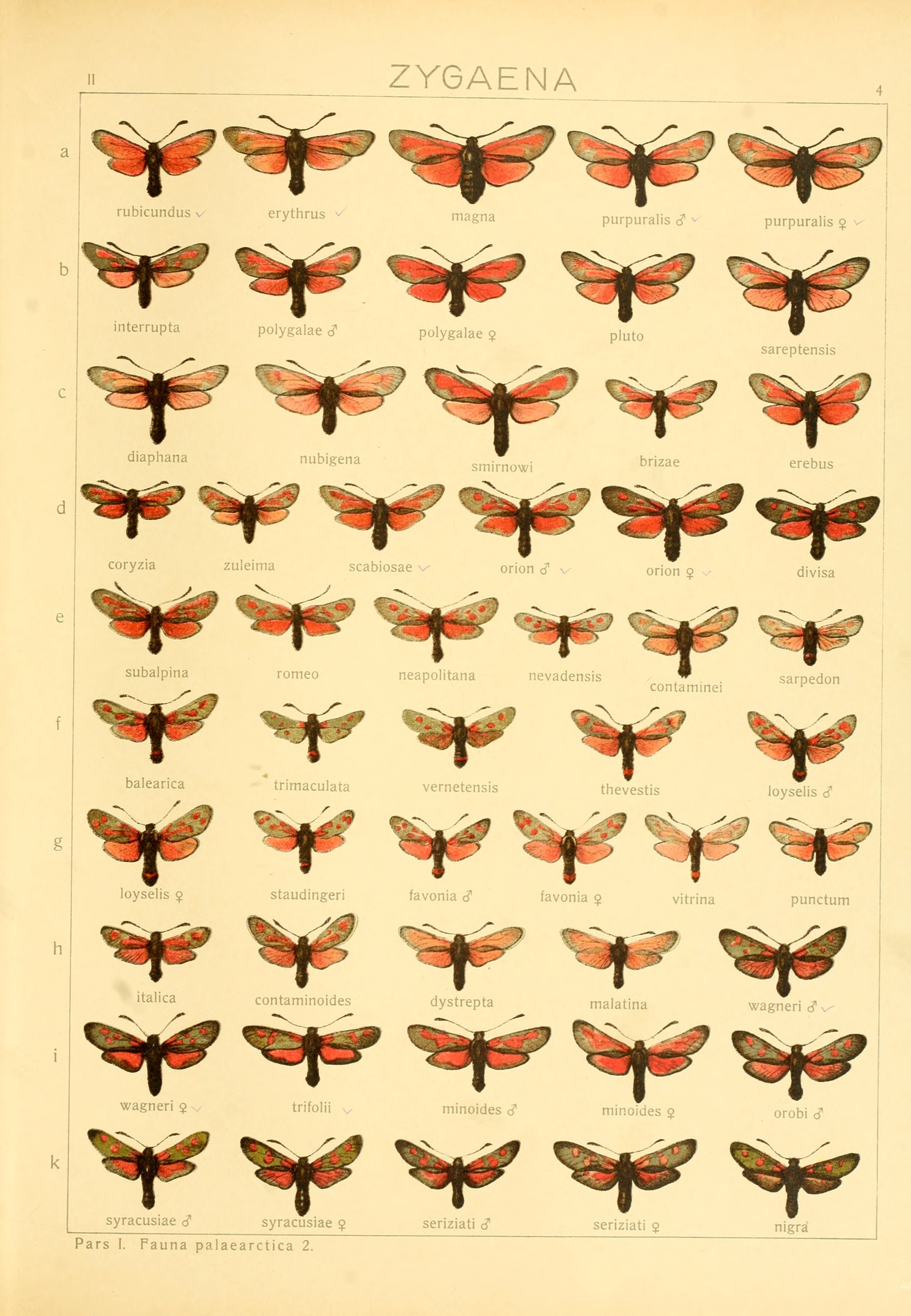
In Die Gross-Schmetterlinge der Erde (The Macrolepidoptera of the World)
