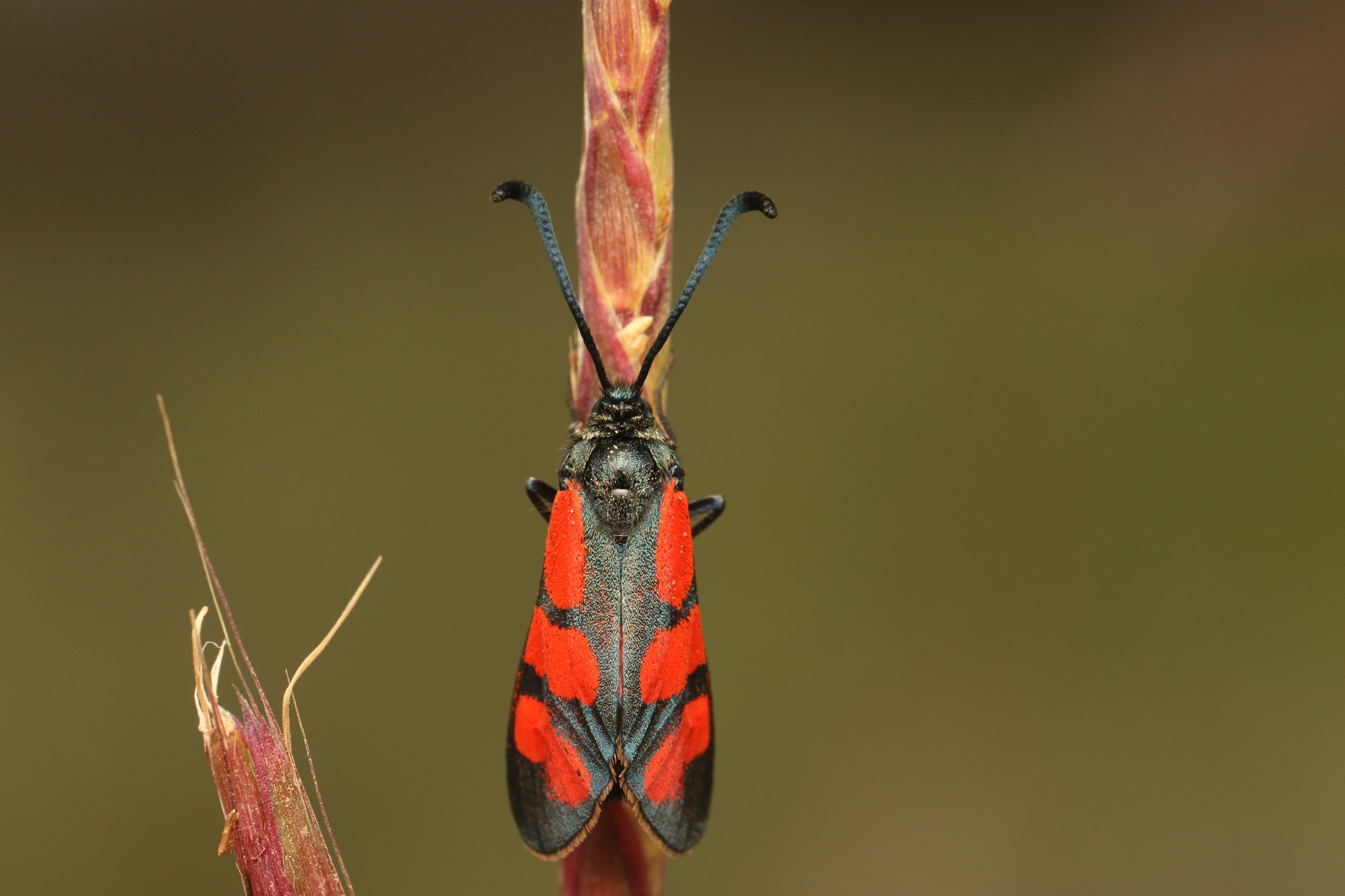
- Zygaena graslini in Israel

Scientific classification
- Kingdom: Animalia
- Phylum: Arthropoda
- Clade: Pancrustacea
- Class: Insecta
- Order: Lepidoptera
- Family: Zygaenidae
- Genus: Zygaena
- Species: Z. graslini

Binomial name
- Zygaena graslini Lederer, 1855

= Zygaena graslini =

Species of moth

Zygaena graslini is a moth of the family Zygaenidae. It is found in Syria, Mesopotamia, Asia Minor, Israel and Lebanon. in graslini the 6 spots of forewing are confluent in pairs, there being a basal, central and marginal red area separated by black bands. In the form confluens Oberth. [synonym of graslini ], from Syria, the basal and central areas are also confluent, the wing being red from the base to beyond the middle.

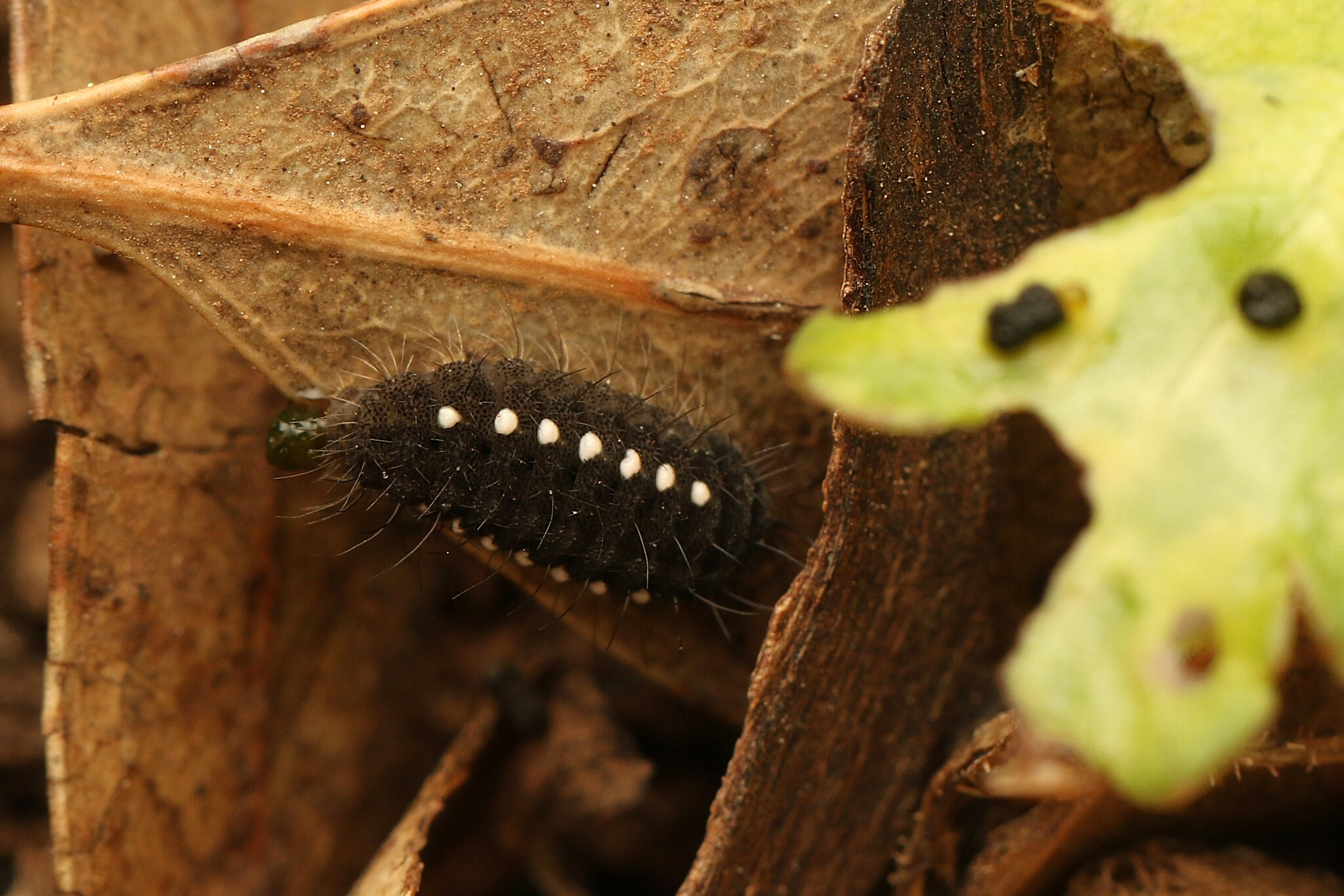
Zygaena graslini caterpillar

== Subspecies ==
- Zygaena graslini graslini
- Zygaena graslini czipkai G. & H. Reiss, 1971
- Zygaena graslini kulzeri Reiss, 1932
- Zygaena graslini maraschensis Reiss, 1935
- Zygaena graslini pfeifferi Reiss, 1932
- Zygaena graslini rebeliana Reiss & Tremewan, 1964
- Zygaena graslini rebeli Reiss, 1932
