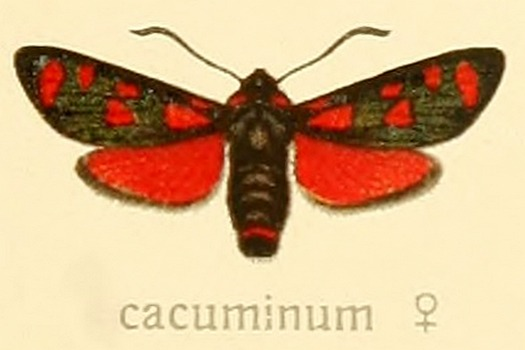
- Zygaena cacuminum in Seitz k

Scientific classification
- Kingdom: Animalia
- Phylum: Arthropoda
- Clade: Pancrustacea
- Class: Insecta
- Order: Lepidoptera
- Family: Zygaenidae
- Genus: Zygaena
- Species: Z. cacuminum

Binomial name
- Zygaena cacuminum Christoph, 1877

= Zygaena cacuminum =

Species of moth

Zygaena cacuminum is a species of moth in the Zygaenidae family. It is found in Iran.In Seitz it is described This species reminds one in pattern of the carniolica-group, the 6. spot of the forewing being parallel to the distal margin. But the colour of all the spots of the forewing as well as of the hindwing is a dull purple, as it hardly occurs again in the whole genus. From Iran.
