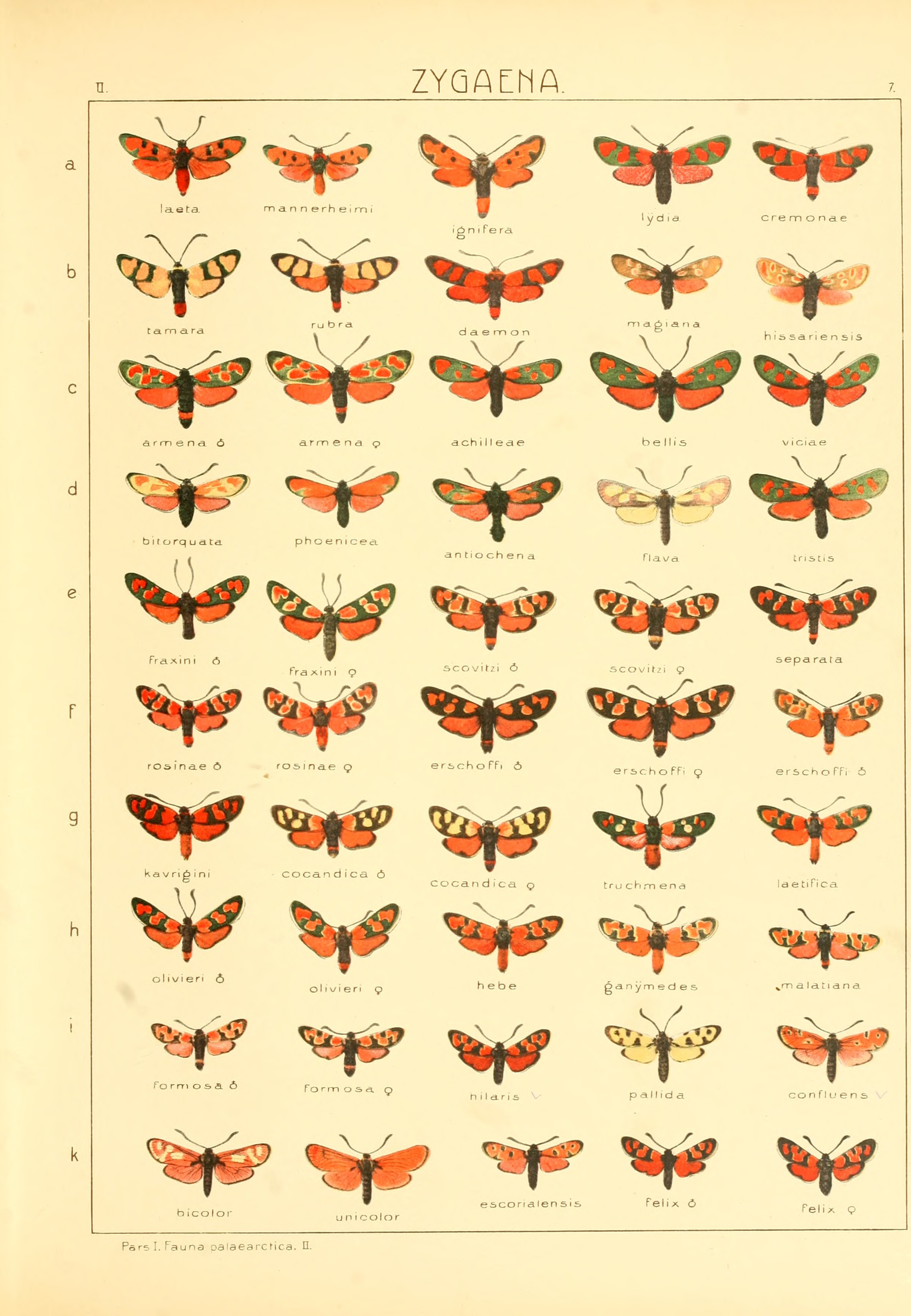
- a

Scientific classification
- Kingdom: Animalia
- Phylum: Arthropoda
- Class: Insecta
- Order: Lepidoptera
- Family: Zygaenidae
- Genus: Zygaena
- Species: Z. ignifera

Binomial name
- Zygaena ignifera Korb, 1897

= Zygaena ignifera =

Species of moth

Zygaena ignifera is a species of moth in the Zygaenidae family. It is found in Spain.
