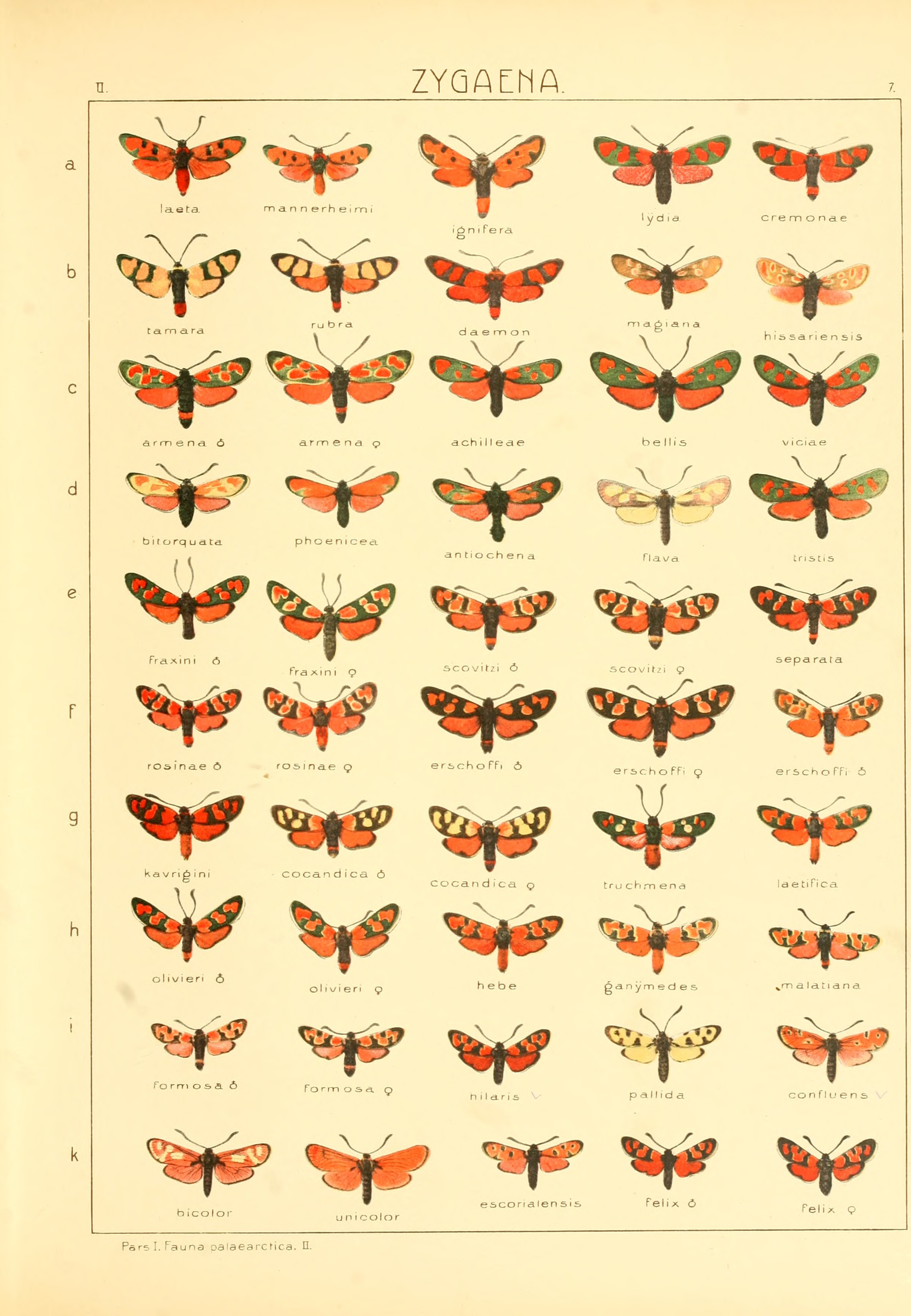
- Zygaena sogdiana separata in Seitz

Scientific classification
- Kingdom: Animalia
- Phylum: Arthropoda
- Class: Insecta
- Order: Lepidoptera
- Family: Zygaenidae
- Genus: Zygaena
- Species: Z. sogdiana

Binomial name
- Zygaena sogdiana Erschoff, 1874

Synonyms
- Z. s. tashkentensis (Reiss, 1932)

= Zygaena sogdiana =

Species of moth

Zygaena sogdiana is a species of moth in the Zygaenidae family. It is found in Central Asia.
