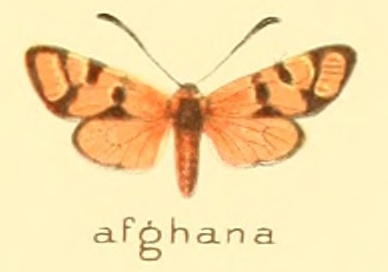

Scientific classification
- Kingdom: Animalia
- Phylum: Arthropoda
- Class: Insecta
- Order: Lepidoptera
- Family: Zygaenidae
- Genus: Zygaena
- Species: Z. afghana

Binomial name
- Zygaena afghana Moore, [1860]

Synonyms
- Zygaena mangeri Burgeff, 1927

= Zygaena afghana =

Species of moth

Zygaena afghana is a species of moth in the Zygaenidae family. It is found in Afghanistan.

== Subspecies ==
- Zygaena afghana afghana
- Zygaena afghana panjaoica Reiss & Schulte, 1964
