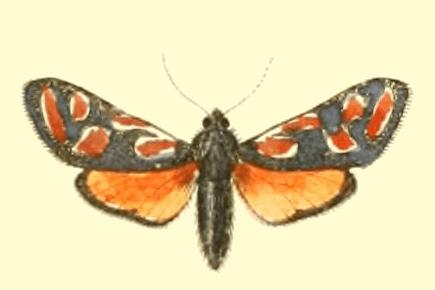

Scientific classification
- Domain: Eukaryota
- Kingdom: Animalia
- Phylum: Arthropoda
- Class: Insecta
- Order: Lepidoptera
- Family: Zygaenidae
- Genus: Zygaena
- Species: Z. orana

Binomial name
- Zygaena orana Duponchel, 1835

Synonyms
- Zygaena barbara Herrich-Schäffer, 1846; Zygaena allardi Oberthür, 1878; Zygaena nedroma Oberthür, 1881; Zygaena hajebensis Reiss & Tremewan, 1960; Zygaena oberthueri Bethune-Baker, 1888; Zygaena oberthüri Bethune-Baker, 1888

= Zygaena orana =

Species of moth

Zygaena orana is a species of moth in the family Zygaenidae. It is found on Sardinia and in North Africa, including Morocco, Algeria and Tunisia.

The larvae feed on Lotus creticus and Lotus cytisoides.

== Subspecies ==
- Zygaena orana orana
- Zygaena orana contristans Oberthür, 1922
- Zygaena orana oberthueri Bethune-Baker, 1888
- Zygaena orana sardoa Mabille 1892
- Zygaena orana tatla Reiss, 1943
- Zygaena orana tirhboulensis Hofmann & G. Reiss, 1982
