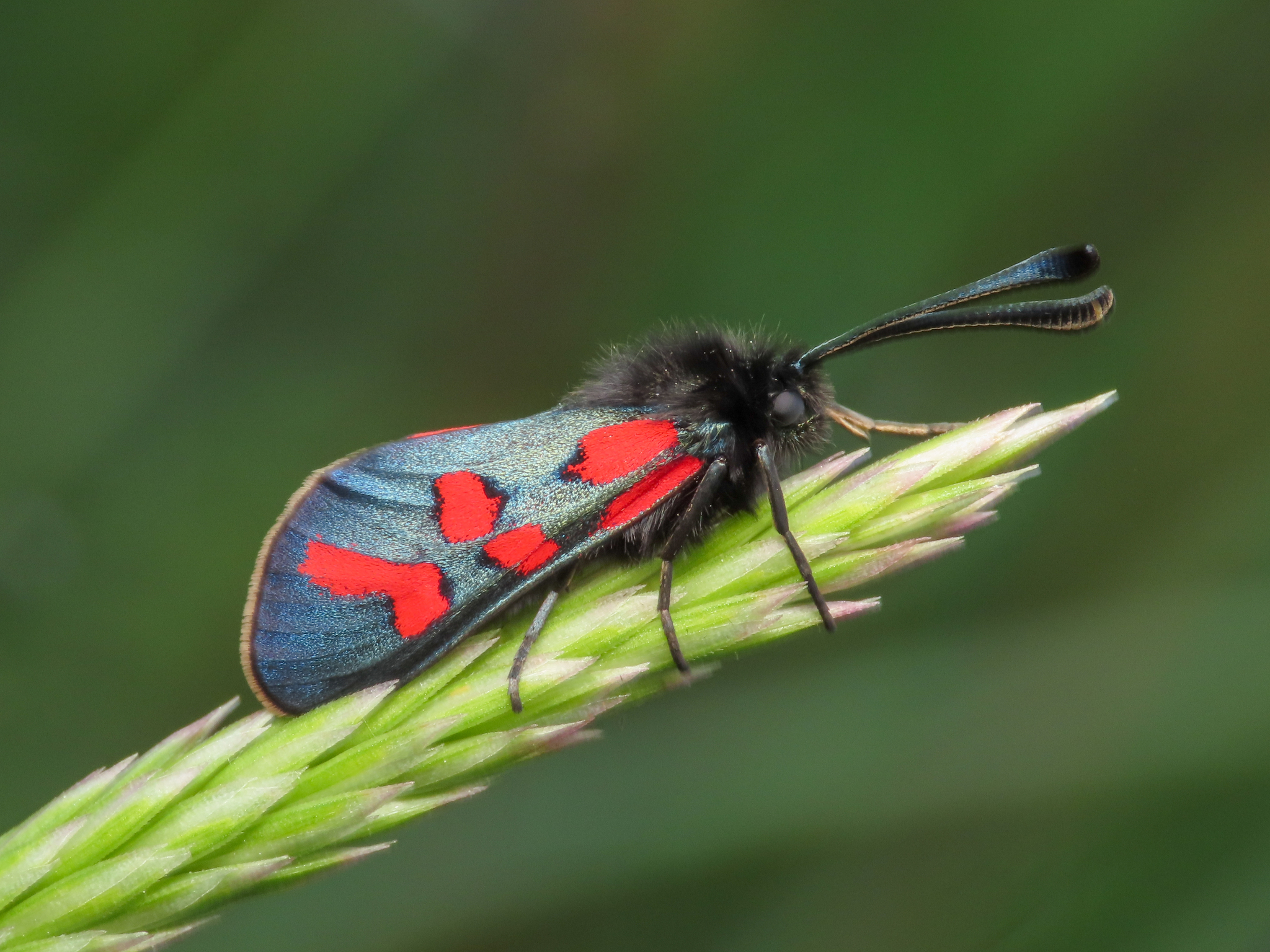

Scientific classification
- Kingdom: Animalia
- Phylum: Arthropoda
- Clade: Pancrustacea
- Class: Insecta
- Order: Lepidoptera
- Family: Zygaenidae
- Genus: Zygaena
- Species: Z. oxytropis

Binomial name
- Zygaena oxytropis Boisduval, 1828

= Zygaena oxytropis =

Species of moth

Zygaena oxytropis is a species of moth in the Zygaenidae family. It is found in mainland Italy and on Sicily.

The larvae feed on Lotus corniculatus, Onobrychis montana and Onobrychis viciifolia.

== Subspecies ==
- Zygaena oxytropis oxytropis
- Zygaena oxytropis acticola Burgeff, 1926
- Zygaena oxytropis quercii Verity, 1920
