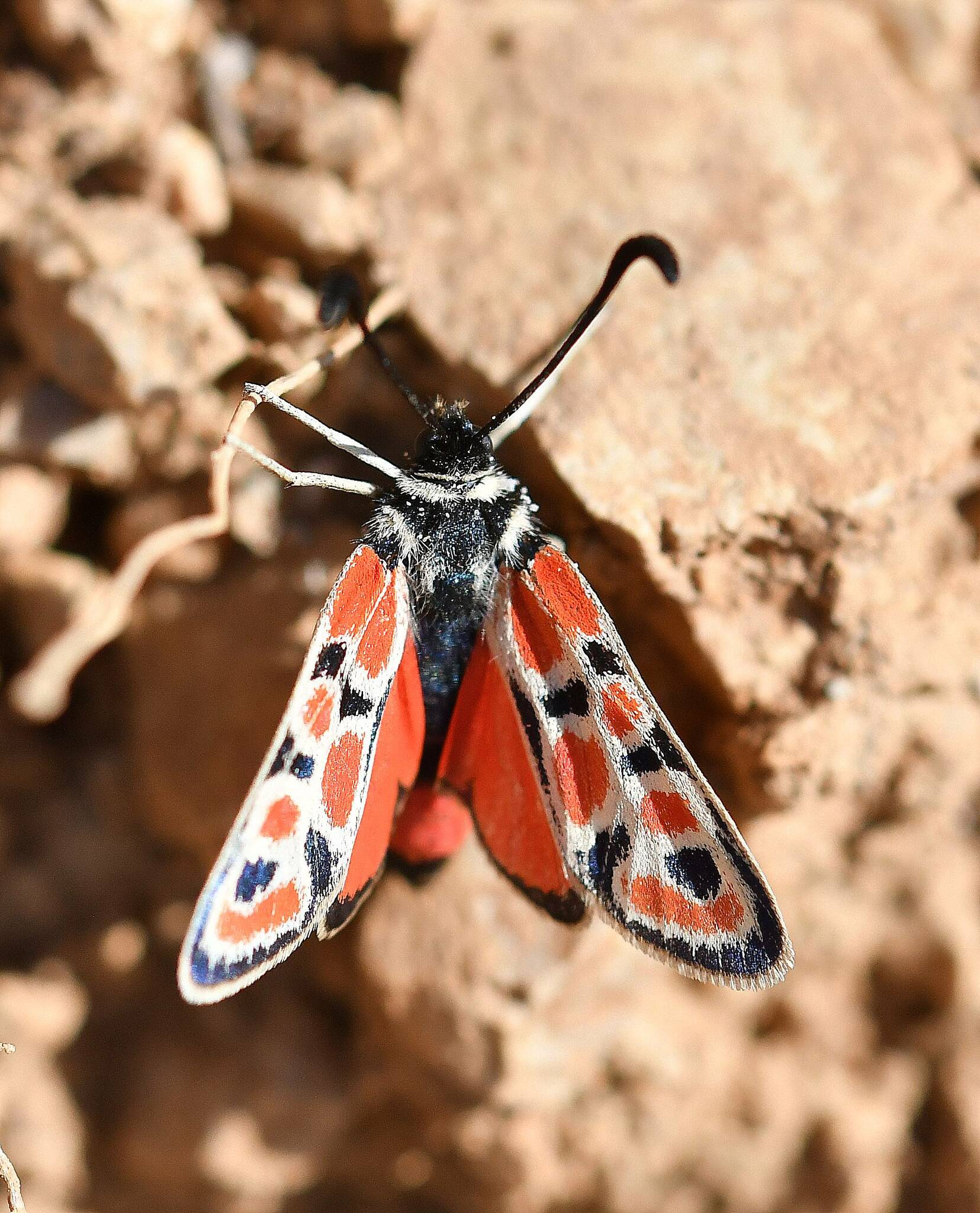

Scientific classification
- Kingdom: Animalia
- Phylum: Arthropoda
- Class: Insecta
- Order: Lepidoptera
- Family: Zygaenidae
- Genus: Zygaena
- Species: Z. felix

Binomial name
- Zygaena felix Oberthür, 1876

= Zygaena felix =

Species of moth

Zygaena felix is a species of moth in the Zygaenidae family. It is found in south Spain and the Atlas Mountains. In Seitz it is described. — In felix Oberth. (7 k), from Algiers and South-West Spain, the black spots are more or less confluent, the red ground-colour along the distal margin being sometimes separated as a sock-like halfmoon. The white edges are usually altogether absent, or there are only feeble vestiges of them — In ab. faustula Stgr.-Reb.[ now Z. felix ssp. constantinensis Reiss & Tremewan, 1964] (8 a) on the contrary the black spots are distinctly edged with yellowish white. — Lastly, ab.mauretanica Stgr. [now Z. felix ssp. constantinensis Reiss & Tremewan, 1964] (8a) has a red belt. — The 3 forms tly exactly at the same time and the same places; I found them frequently united in copula. They are extremely common throughout June on nearly all the heights of the Atlas Mts., sometimes the one sometimes the other form being prevalent in the various flight-places.

== Biology ==
The larvae feed on Acanthyllis and Hedysarum humile.
