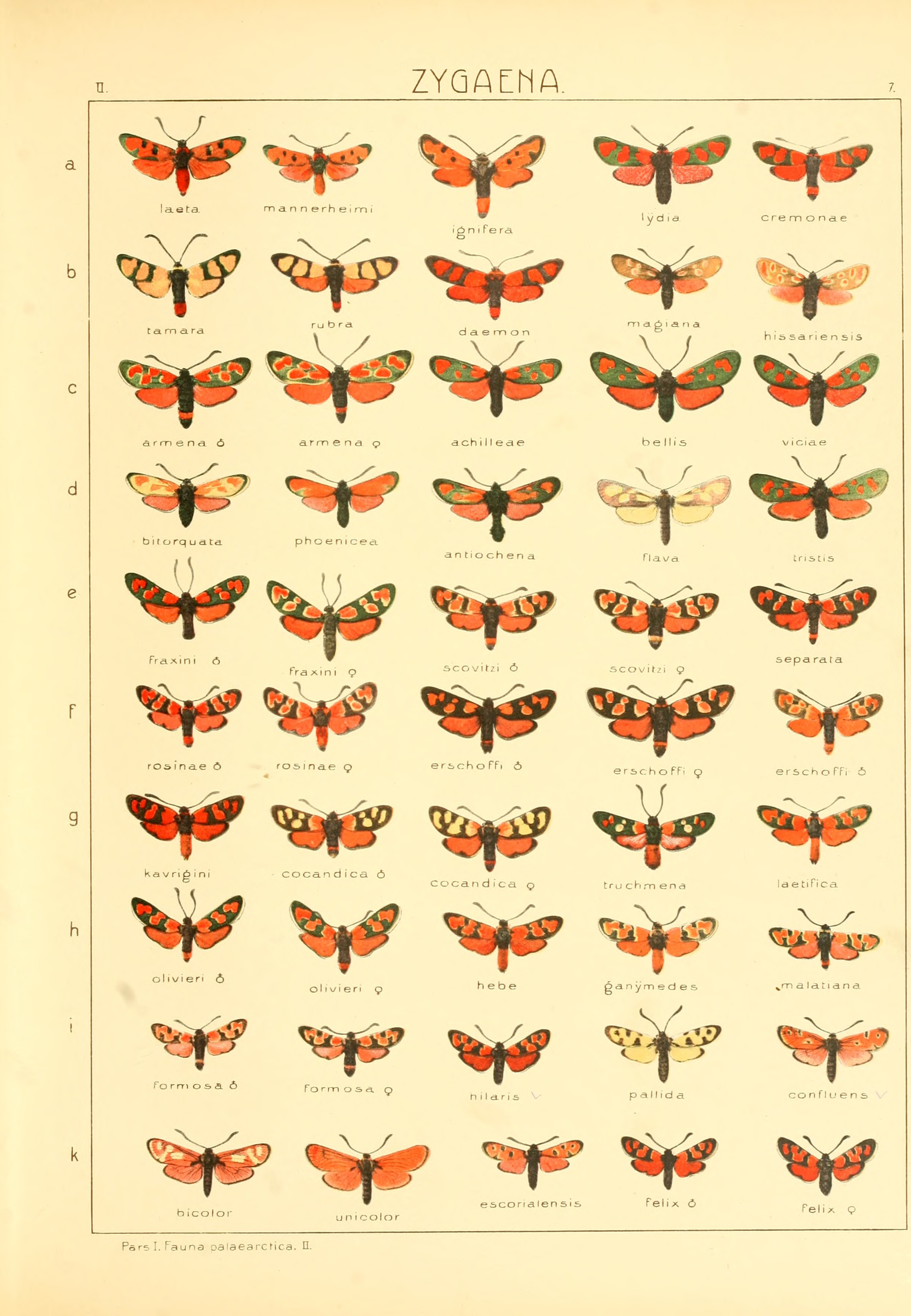
- Zygaena magiana and hissariensisin Seitz b

Scientific classification
- Domain: Eukaryota
- Kingdom: Animalia
- Phylum: Arthropoda
- Class: Insecta
- Order: Lepidoptera
- Family: Zygaenidae
- Genus: Zygaena
- Species: Z. magiana

Binomial name
- Zygaena magiana Staudinger, 1889

= Zygaena magiana =

Species of moth

Zygaena magiana is a species of moth in the Zygaenidae family. It is found in Central Asia.

Z.magiana (7b) is a pale-coloured, somewhat transparent, Burnet from the mountains near Samarkand, about the habits of which little definite is known. — The ab. hissariensis Gr.-Grsh [ now Zygaena magiana ssp. hissariensis Grum-Grshimailo, 1890], which is connected with the preceding by all intergradations and which occurs in the same country, has the spots of the forewing small and sharply defined; the 6 transverse spot and the vestiges of the abdominal belt which appear occasionally are without weight in distinguishing this form; from Virgil Gazi, end of July. — In the likewise Central Asiatic kohistana Gr.-Grsh. now ''Z. m.'' ssp. ''kohistana'' Grum-Grshimailo, 1893 on the contrary there are only vestiges of a red collar and abdominal belt.
