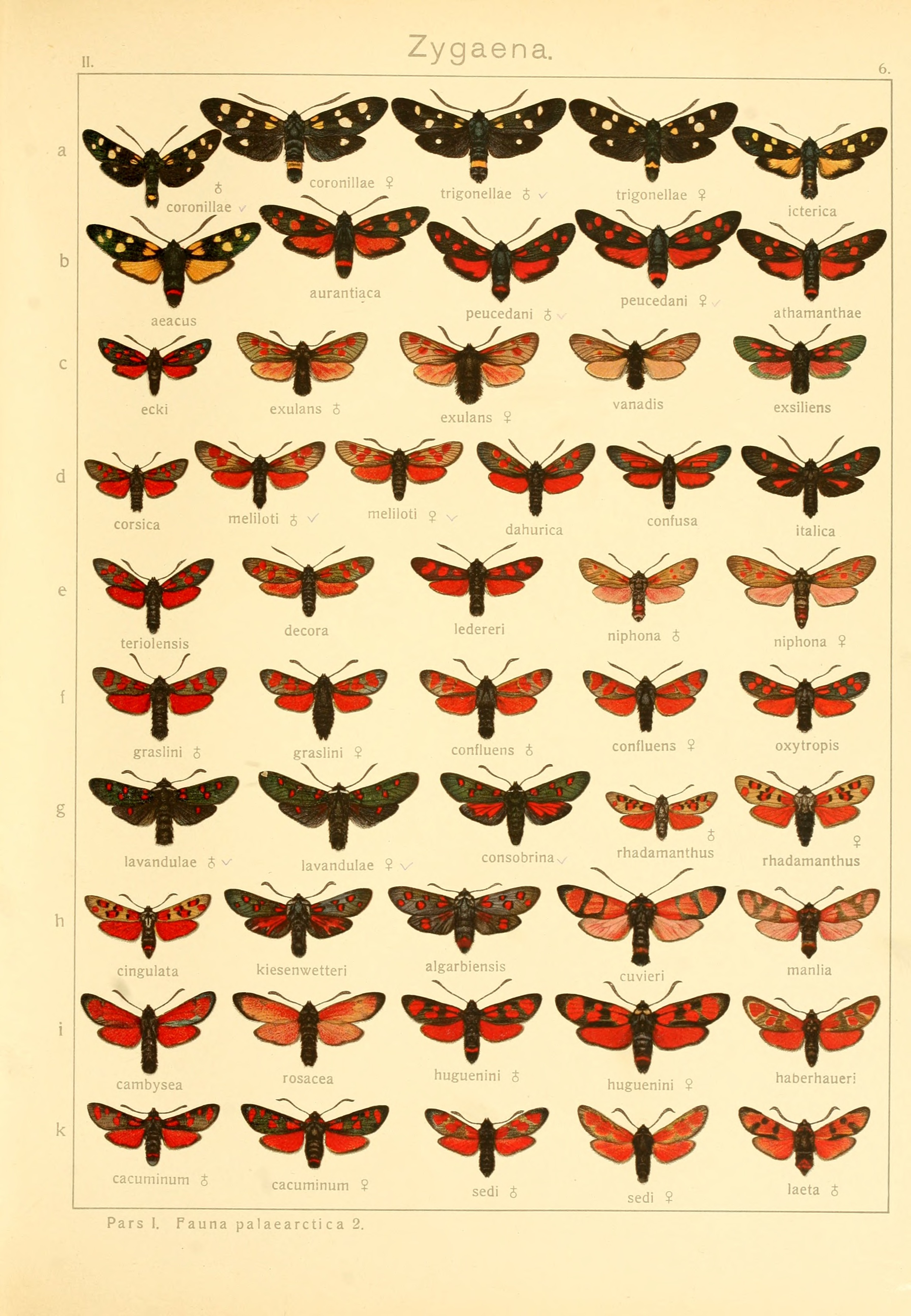
- Zygaena sedi 6k

Scientific classification
- Domain: Eukaryota
- Kingdom: Animalia
- Phylum: Arthropoda
- Class: Insecta
- Order: Lepidoptera
- Family: Zygaenidae
- Genus: Zygaena
- Species: Z. sedi

Binomial name
- Zygaena sedi Fabricius, 1787

= Zygaena sedi =

Species of moth

Zygaena sedi is a species of moth in the Zygaenidae family. It is found in Greece, Bulgaria, Turkey, Ukraine and Russia. In Seitz it is described - Z. sedi Fab. (6k). In this insect the spots of each pair are merged to large light red patches, these being separated from each other only by thin lines of the transparent ground-colour. Abdomen without belt. Coasts of the Black Sea.

== Subspecies ==
- Zygaena sedi sedi
- Zygaena sedi dellabrunai Dujardin, 1981
- Zygaena sedi sliwenensis Reiss, 1933
