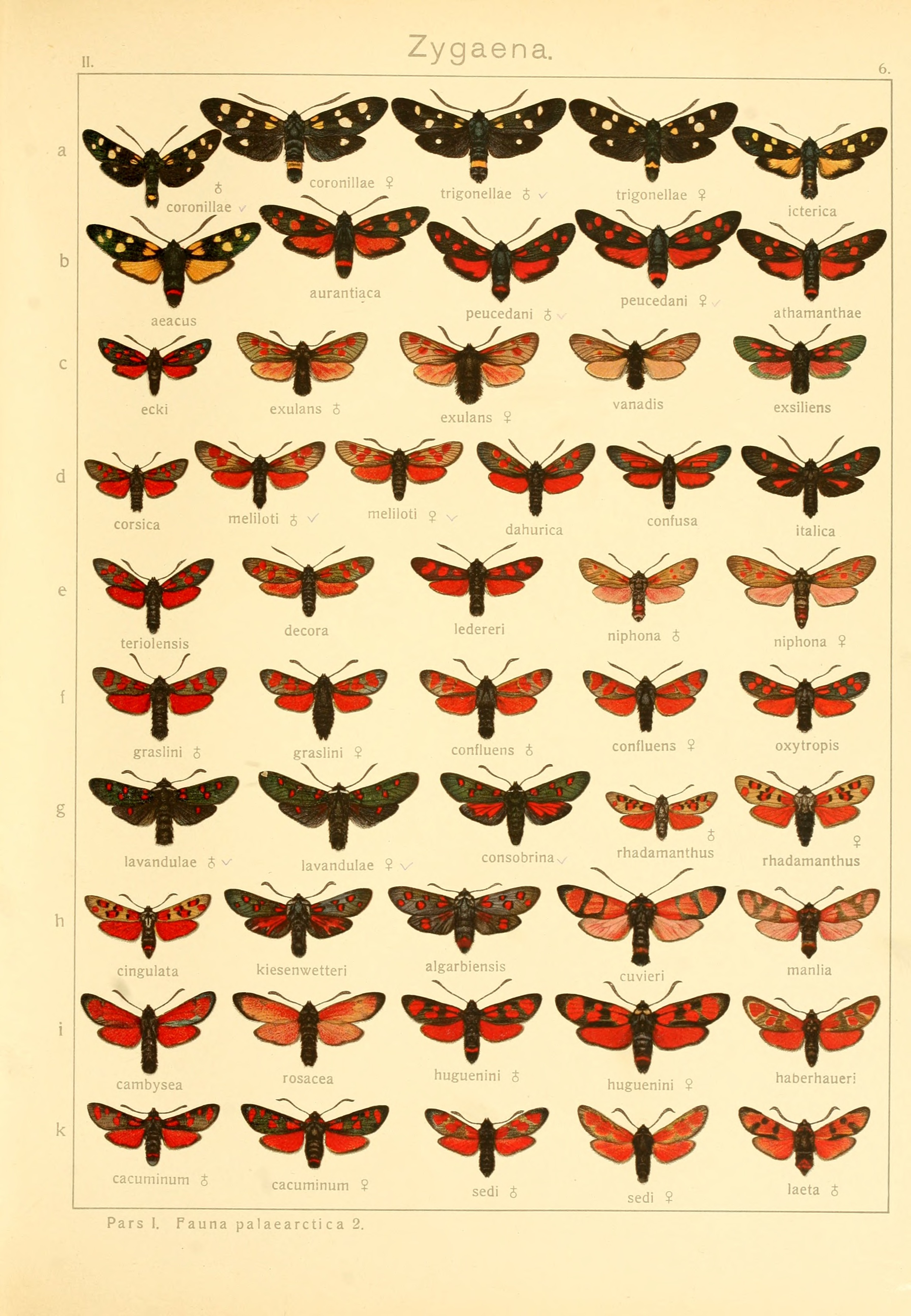
- Zygaena haberhaueri in Seitz i

Scientific classification
- Kingdom: Animalia
- Phylum: Arthropoda
- Class: Insecta
- Order: Lepidoptera
- Family: Zygaenidae
- Genus: Zygaena
- Species: Z. haberhaueri

Binomial name
- Zygaena haberhaueri Lederer, 1870

= Zygaena haberhaueri =

Species of moth

Zygaena haberhaueri is a species of moth in the Zygaenidae family. It is found in Armenia and Georgia In Seitz it is described With red collar, but without red belt. On forewing obliquely from costa to anal angle an evenly wide greyish black band separating a triangular marginal patch from the red area of the wing, this area moreover being costally incised at the basal third or divided by a slight band. In Armenia, apparently in localities where for a long while past no collections have been made.
