= Zygaena aurata =

Scientific classification
- Domain: Eukaryota
- Kingdom: Animalia
- Phylum: Arthropoda
- Class: Insecta
- Order: Lepidoptera
- Family: Zygaenidae
- Genus: Zygaena
- Species: Z. aurata

Binomial name
- Zygaena aurata Blachier, 1905.

Species of moth

Zygaena aurata is a species of moth in the family Zygaenidae. It is found in the Atlas Mountains of Morocco. In Seitz it is described Z. aurata as a form (now species) of favonia with glossy brass-yellow ground-colour: discovered in Julv in the Moroccan Atlas.
