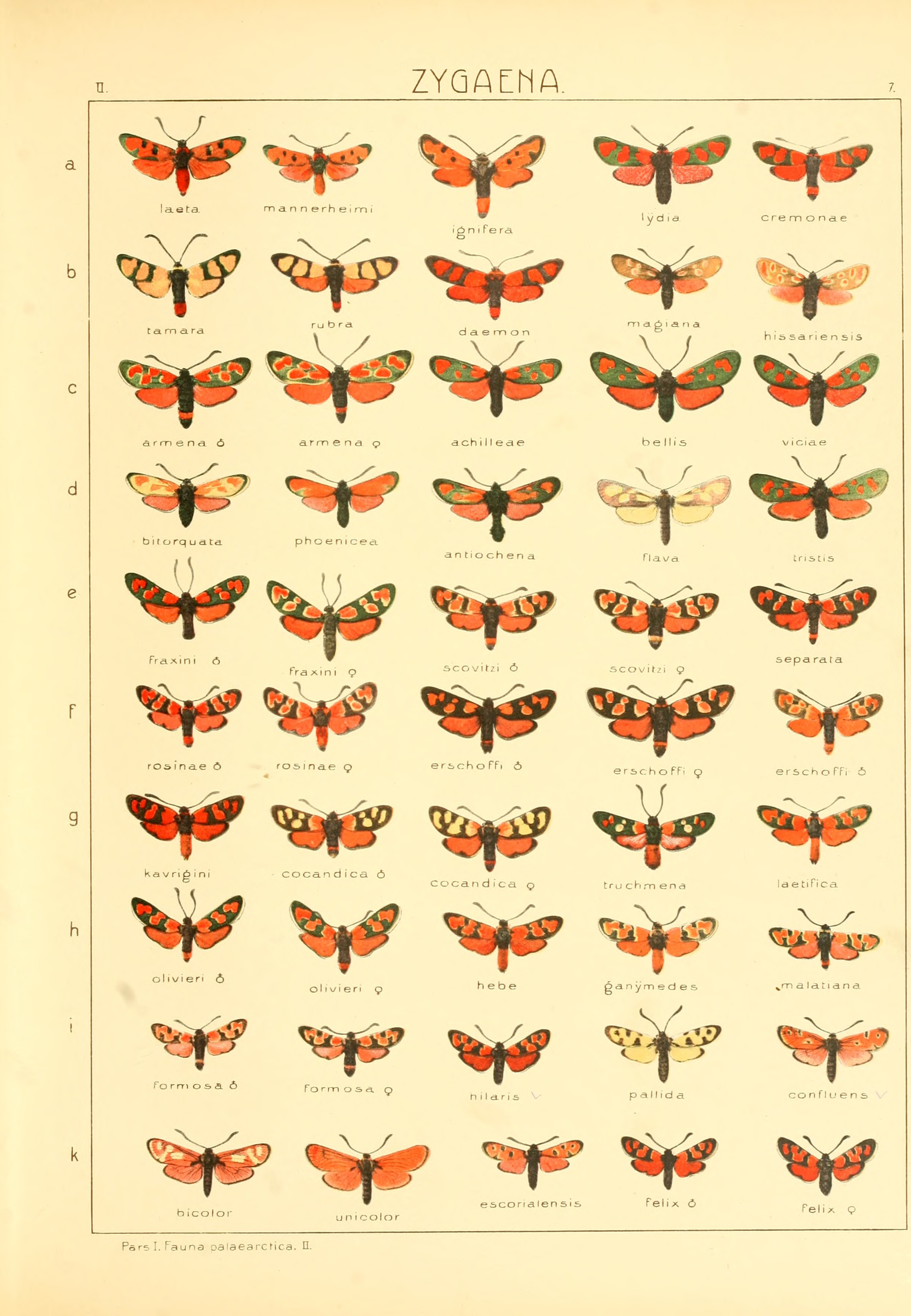
- Zygaena truchmena in Seitz g

Scientific classification
- Domain: Eukaryota
- Kingdom: Animalia
- Phylum: Arthropoda
- Class: Insecta
- Order: Lepidoptera
- Family: Zygaenidae
- Genus: Zygaena
- Species: Z. truchmena

Binomial name
- Zygaena truchmena Eversmann, 1854

= Zygaena truchmena =

Species of moth

Zygaena truchmena is a species of moth in the Zygaenidae family. It is found in Central Asia.

According to Seitz - the prettiest and most variegated form, in short one of the finest Burnets, is truchmena Evrsm. (7g). It has a broad rosy- red collar, and the abdomen is bright red, except the apex : the median pair of spots of forewing, however, is white and the basal half of the hindwing transparent: Turkestan.
