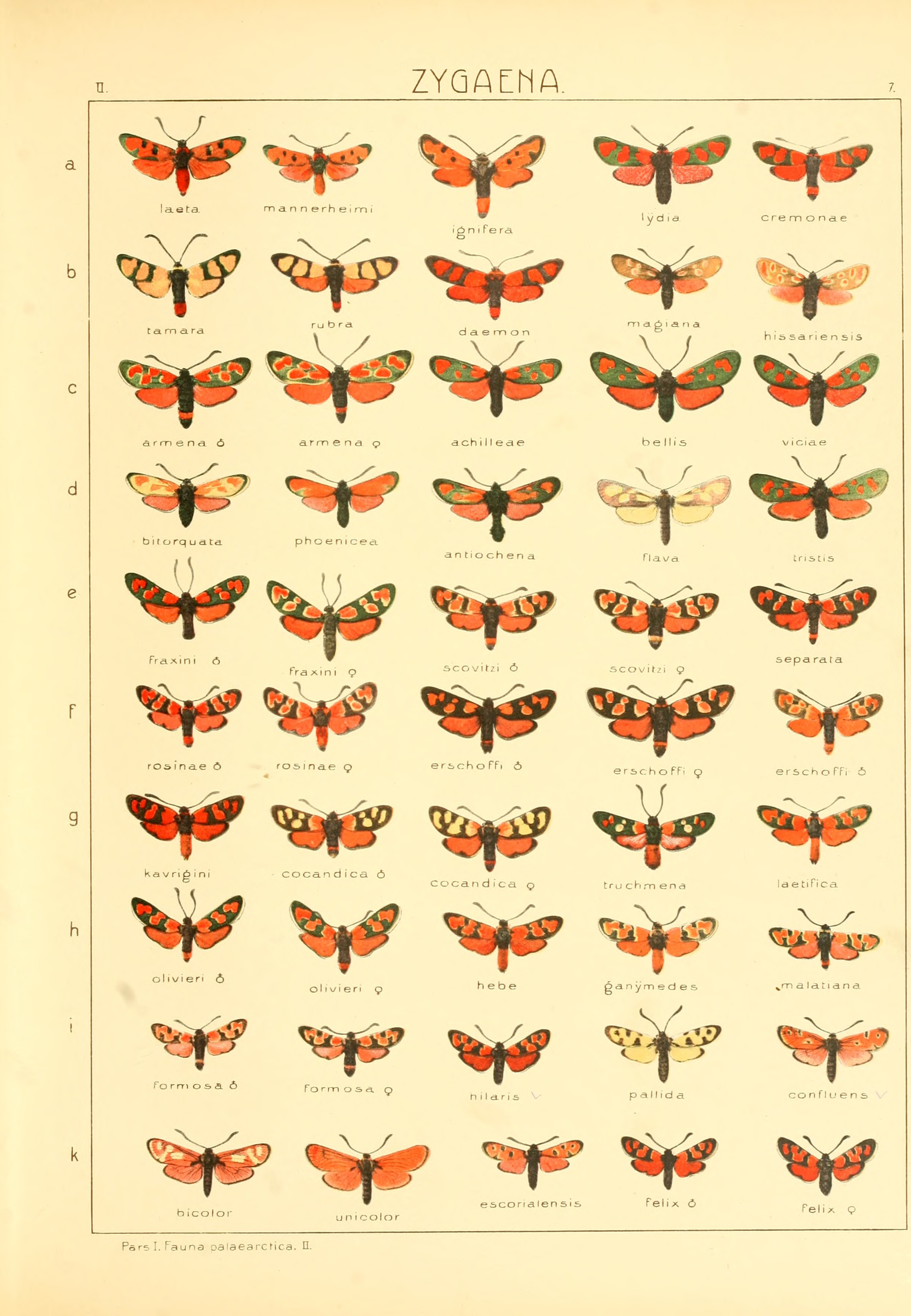
- Zygaena kavrigini in Seitz g

Scientific classification
- Kingdom: Animalia
- Phylum: Arthropoda
- Class: Insecta
- Order: Lepidoptera
- Family: Zygaenidae
- Genus: Zygaena
- Species: Z. kavrigini

Binomial name
- Zygaena kavrigini Grum-Grshimailo, 1887

= Zygaena kavrigini =

Species of moth

Zygaena kavrigini is a species of moth in the Zygaenidae family. It is found in Central Asia. Seitz states Z. kavrigini Gr.-Grsh. (7 g) has the abdomen mostly entirely red, inclusive of base; from Kuchara. The larva feeds on Alhagi canescens.
