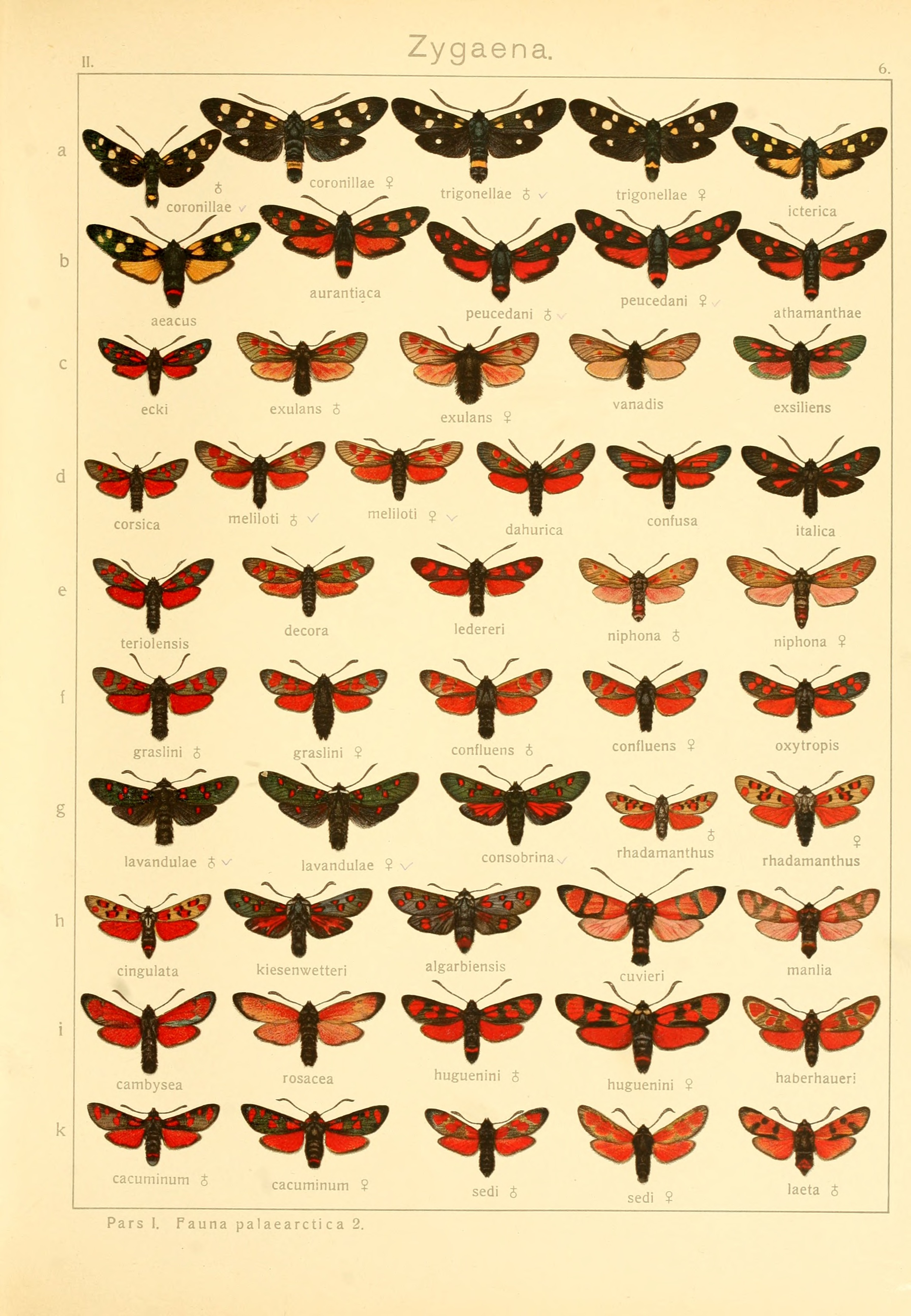
- Zygaena ecki in Seitz c

Scientific classification
- Domain: Eukaryota
- Kingdom: Animalia
- Phylum: Arthropoda
- Class: Insecta
- Order: Lepidoptera
- Family: Zygaenidae
- Genus: Zygaena
- Species: Z. ecki

Binomial name
- Zygaena ecki Christoph, 1882

= Zygaena ecki =

Species of moth

Zygaena ecki is a species of moth in the Zygaenidae family. It is found in Iran. In Seitz it is described - Z. ecki Christ. (6c). Little is known of this rather isolated Burnet, which does not stand in close relationship to any other, not being allied to ephialtes or exulans, nor to anthyllidis, behind which it is placed in the catalogue of Staudinger-Rebel. The dull dark grey forewing bears six pinkish crimson spots of which the two distal ones are slightly confluent; hindwing of the same tint, with rather broad black margin and reddish grey fringes. The abdomen is usually black, but occurs also with red belt, = cingulata Hirschke. Persia.
