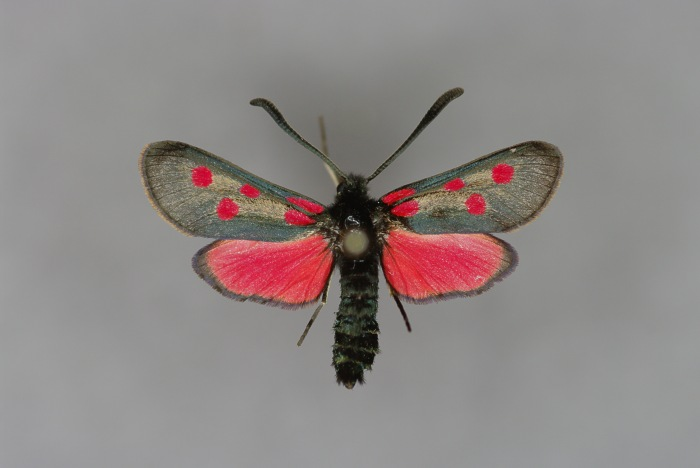
- Zygaena corsica, Monti del Gennargentu, Sardinia

Scientific classification
- Domain: Eukaryota
- Kingdom: Animalia
- Phylum: Arthropoda
- Class: Insecta
- Order: Lepidoptera
- Family: Zygaenidae
- Genus: Zygaena
- Species: Z. corsica

Binomial name
- Zygaena corsica Boisduval, 1828

= Zygaena corsica =

Species of moth

Zygaena corsica is a species of moth in the Zygaenidae family. It is found on Corsica and Sardinia. Seitz describes as - A peculiar small Burnet with 5 almost equal-sized spots which are very round and glossy bright red, the ground-colour between them having in certain aspect a somewhat brassy lustre. — In May and June in Sardinia and Corsica. — Larva light grey-blue, at the side a dark hue, and on the back a white one, along which there are black spots; in May on Santolina nicana. Cocoon light brown. The moths in June and July, on sunny slopes, especially frequent at higher altitudes.

The larvae feed on Santolina insularis and Plagius flosculosum.
