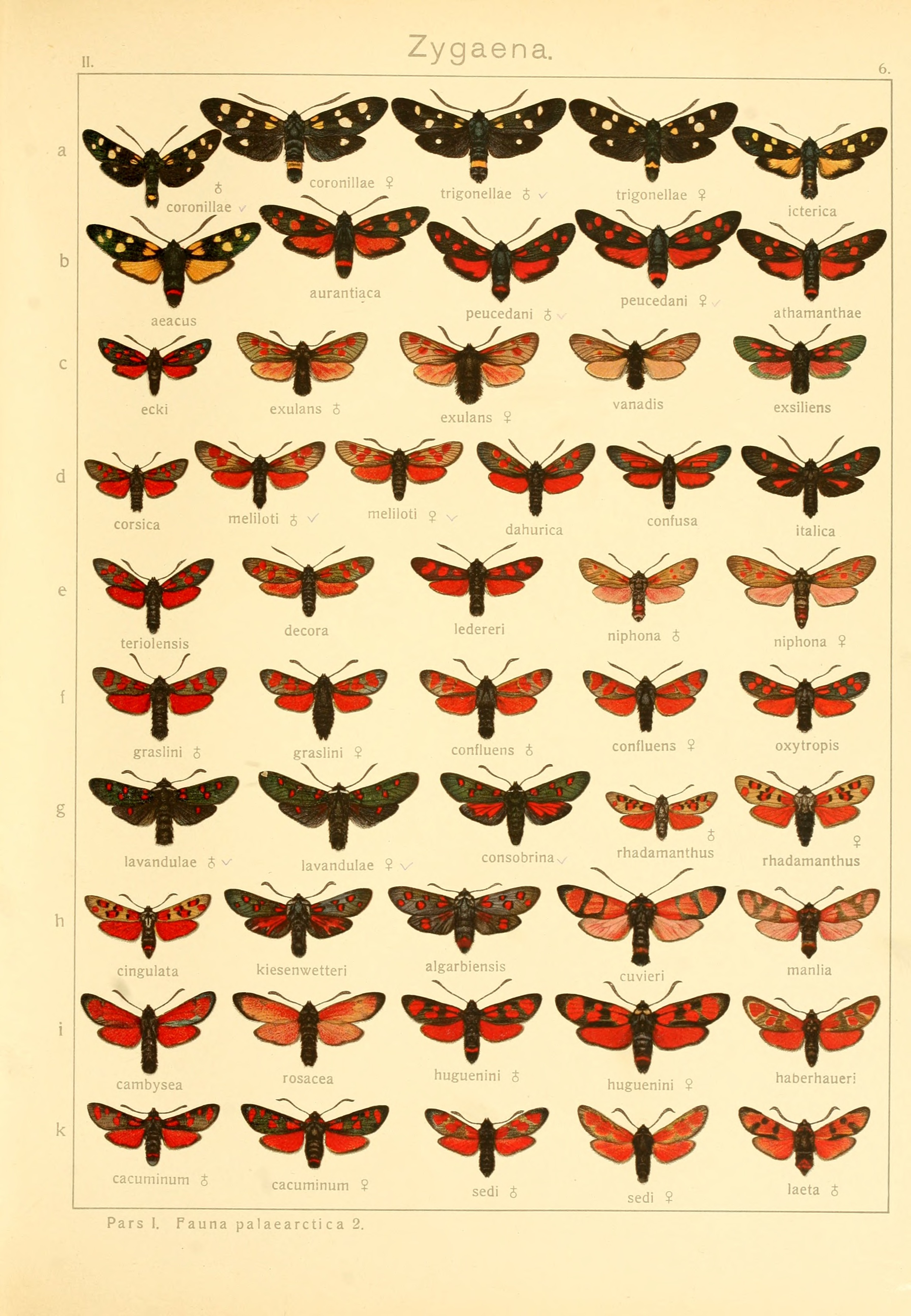
- Zygaena huguenini in Seitz i

Scientific classification
- Domain: Eukaryota
- Kingdom: Animalia
- Phylum: Arthropoda
- Class: Insecta
- Order: Lepidoptera
- Family: Zygaenidae
- Genus: Zygaena
- Species: Z. huguenini

Binomial name
- Zygaena huguenini Staudinger, 1887

= Zygaena huguenini =

Species of moth

Zygaena huguenini is a species of moth in the Zygaenidae family. It is found in the Pamir Mountains. In Seitz it is described - a large heavy-built Zygaena from the Pamir. Instead of the 3 pair of spots the forewing bears a large patch occupying the whole marginal area; the 1. and 2. pair of spots of the forewing are separated by a black transverse band, the spots of each pair however being united.
