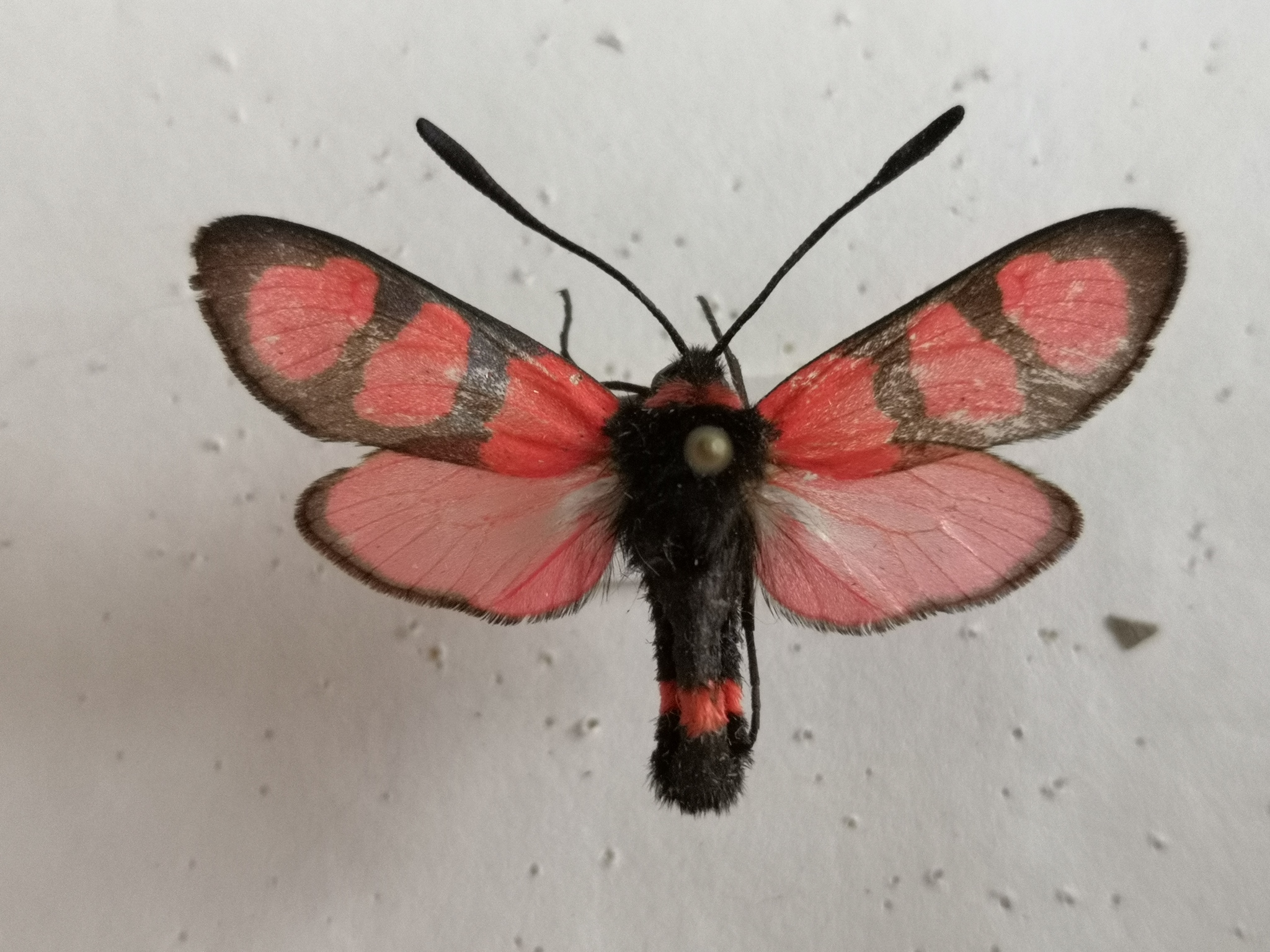

Scientific classification
- Domain: Eukaryota
- Kingdom: Animalia
- Phylum: Arthropoda
- Class: Insecta
- Order: Lepidoptera
- Family: Zygaenidae
- Genus: Zygaena
- Species: Z. cuvieri

Binomial name
- Zygaena cuvieri Boisduval, [1828]

= Zygaena cuvieri =

Species of moth

Zygaena cuvieri is a species of moth in the Zygaenidae family found from Armenia and Syria to Central Asia. In Seitz it is described as follows: "This large fine Burnet has rosy-red wings, the forewing being divided into 3 areas by two black-grey bands; a broad collar and a rosy abdominal belt. Inhabits Anterior Asia, from Syria through Mesopotamia to Turkestan."
