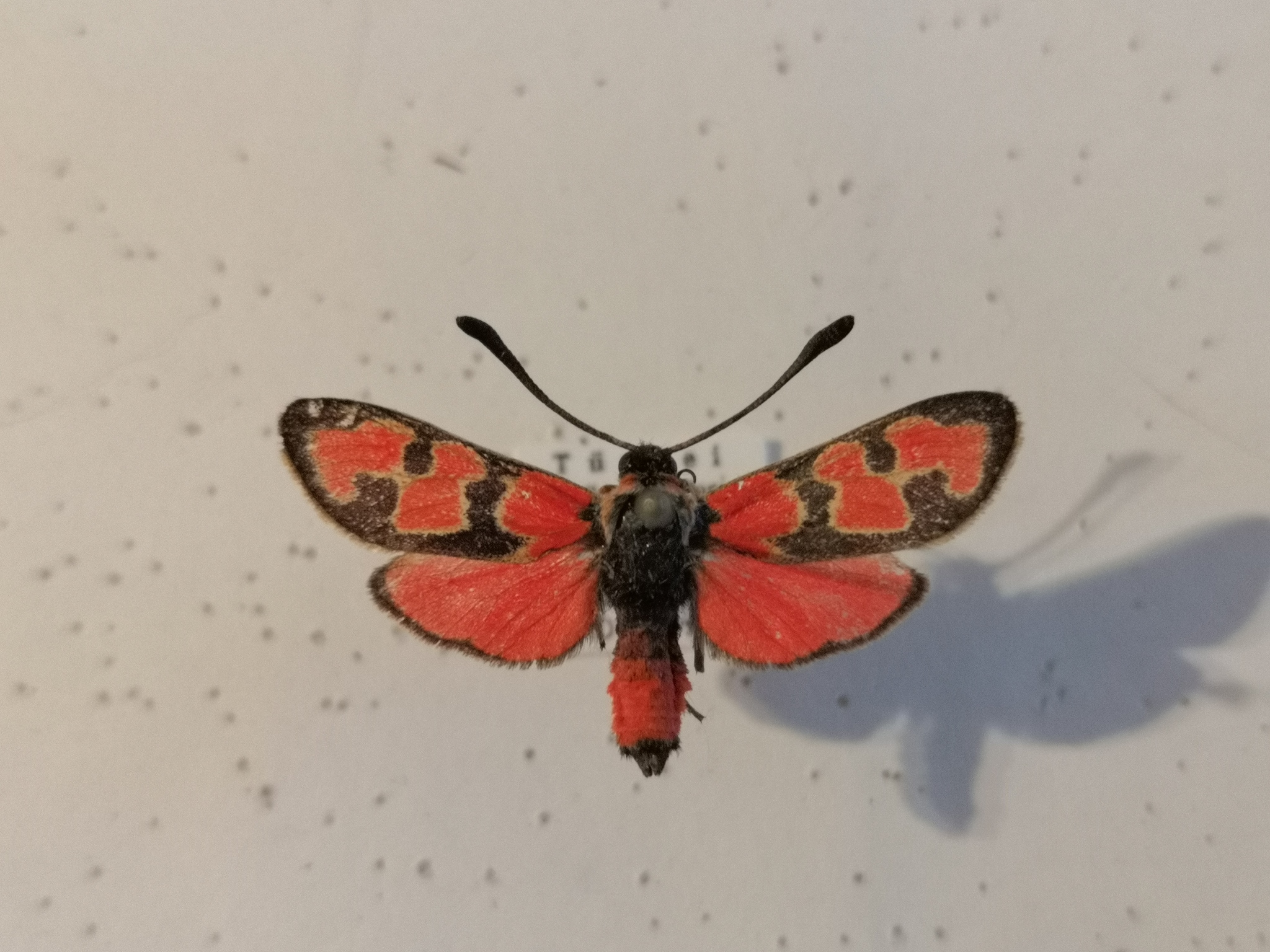

Scientific classification
- Kingdom: Animalia
- Phylum: Arthropoda
- Class: Insecta
- Order: Lepidoptera
- Family: Zygaenidae
- Genus: Zygaena
- Species: Z. olivieri

Binomial name
- Zygaena olivieri Boisduval, [1828]

= Zygaena olivieri =

Species of moth

Zygaena olivieri is a species of moth in the Zygaenidae family. It is found in Syria, Armenia. Turkey and Georgia. Seitz describes it -In olivieri Boisd. (= dsidsilia Frr.) (7h) not only the collar and 2—8 abdominal segments are red but also the patagia, the red spots of the forewing being very large; from Syria and Armenia.In subspecies Z. o. laetifica Herrich-Schäffer, 1846 the pairs of spots on forewing are separate. — In Z. o. ganimedes Freyer, [1851] from Amasia, the penultimate pair of spots and the apical patch are rather broadly connected and the red markings of the forewing have a white edge of about 1 mm width.
