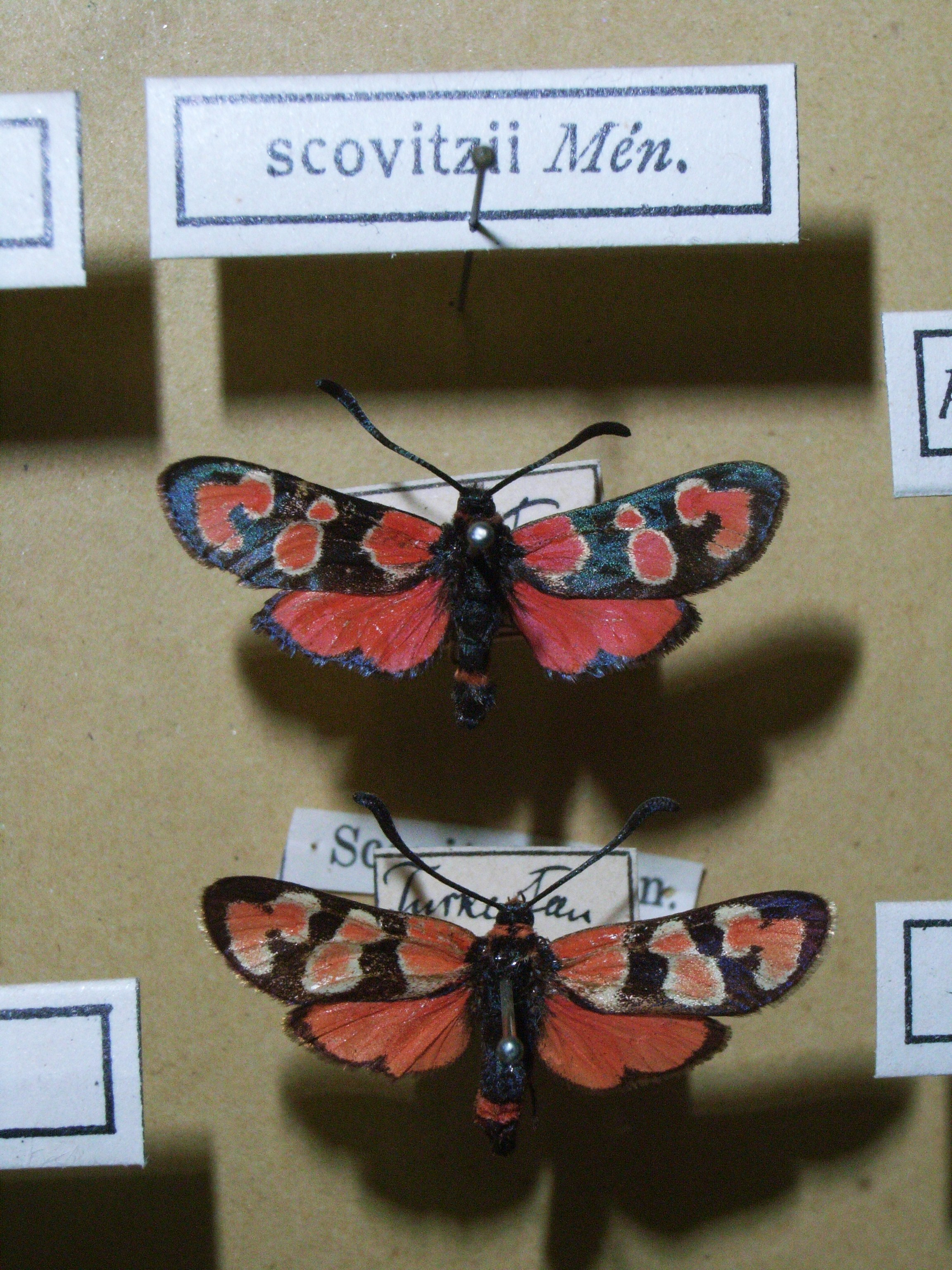

Scientific classification
- Domain: Eukaryota
- Kingdom: Animalia
- Phylum: Arthropoda
- Class: Insecta
- Order: Lepidoptera
- Family: Zygaenidae
- Genus: Zygaena
- Species: Z. fraxini

Binomial name
- Zygaena fraxini Ménétriés, 1832

Synonyms
- Zygaena scovitzii Ménétriés, 1832; Zygaena oribasus Herrich-Schäffer, 1846; Zygaena rognada Boisduval, 1848; Zygaena slabyiana Reiss, 1937

= Zygaena fraxini =

Species of moth

Zygaena fraxini is a moth of the family Zygaenidae.It is a Palearctic confined to Western Asia.

== Technical description and variation (Seitz) ==
Z. fraxini Men. (= oribasus H.-Sch., carneolica Freyer, rogdana Boisd.) (7e) is the first of a series of species from Western and Central Asia. The 2 basal spots of the forewing are united to a large vivid red patch which occupies the entire basal area. Of the central pair of spots the lower one is always much the larger, if the two spots are not merged; the distal spots are united to a severally incised, often very irregular patch. The red spots are partly edged with white, the abdomen being always entirely black in the name-typical form. Armenia.— In perdita Stgr. [ Z. fraxini ssp. perdita Staudinger, 1887 ] from the Caucasus, the central spots are white, not being or scarcely centred with red, and the hindwing is broadly edged with black. — scovitzii Men. [Synonym for Z. fraxini Ménétriés, 1832 (7e) has a broad rosy red collar and sometimes a red abdominal belt, on the hindwing a small, black, usually triangular spot being attached to the middle of the narrow black distal margin; Persia and the Pamir.
