= Phtheochroa canariana =

Scientific classification
- Domain: Eukaryota
- Kingdom: Animalia
- Phylum: Arthropoda
- Class: Insecta
- Order: Lepidoptera
- Family: Tortricidae
- Genus: Phtheochroa
- Species: P. canariana

Binomial name
- Phtheochroa canariana (Barnes & Busck, 1920)

Synonyms
- Hysterosia canariana Barnes & Busck, 1920

Species of moth

Phtheochroa canariana is a species of moth of the family Tortricidae first described by William Barnes and August Busck in 1920. It is found in the United States, where it has been recorded from Arizona.

== Taxonomy ==
It is often listed as a synonym of Phtheochroa fulviplicana.
