= Phtheochroa aarviki =

Scientific classification
- Kingdom: Animalia
- Phylum: Arthropoda
- Clade: Pancrustacea
- Class: Insecta
- Order: Lepidoptera
- Family: Tortricidae
- Genus: Phtheochroa
- Species: P. aarviki

Binomial name
- Phtheochroa aarviki Razowski & J.W. Brown, 2012

Species of moth

Phtheochroa aarviki is a species of moth of the family Tortricidae. It is found in Kenya.

Larvae have been reared on the fruit of Bothriocline species.
