= Phtheochroa purissima =

Scientific classification
- Domain: Eukaryota
- Kingdom: Animalia
- Phylum: Arthropoda
- Class: Insecta
- Order: Lepidoptera
- Family: Tortricidae
- Genus: Phtheochroa
- Species: P. purissima

Binomial name
- Phtheochroa purissima (Osthelder, 1938)

Synonyms
- Phalonia purissima Osthelder, 1938

Species of moth

Phtheochroa purissima is a species of moth of the family Tortricidae. It is found in the Elburz Mountains of Iran.
