= Phtheochroa veirsi =

Scientific classification
- Kingdom: Animalia
- Phylum: Arthropoda
- Clade: Pancrustacea
- Class: Insecta
- Order: Lepidoptera
- Family: Tortricidae
- Genus: Phtheochroa
- Species: P. veirsi

Binomial name
- Phtheochroa veirsi Razowski, 1986

Species of insect

Phtheochroa veirsi is a species of moth of the family Tortricidae. It is found in Durango, Mexico.
