= Phtheochroa osthelderi =

Scientific classification
- Kingdom: Animalia
- Phylum: Arthropoda
- Clade: Pancrustacea
- Class: Insecta
- Order: Lepidoptera
- Family: Tortricidae
- Genus: Phtheochroa
- Species: P. osthelderi

Binomial name
- Phtheochroa osthelderi Huemer, 1989

Species of moth

Phtheochroa osthelderi is a species of moth of the family Tortricidae. It is found in Syria and Turkey.
