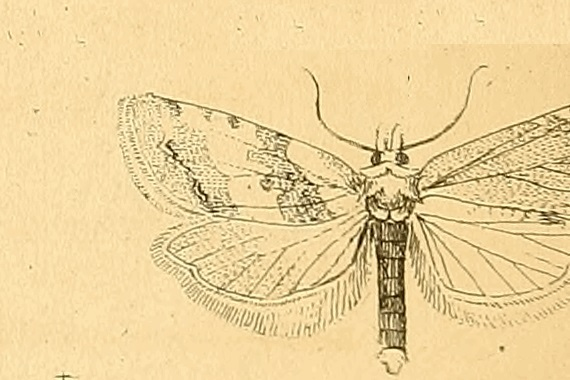

Scientific classification
- Kingdom: Animalia
- Phylum: Arthropoda
- Clade: Pancrustacea
- Class: Insecta
- Order: Lepidoptera
- Family: Tortricidae
- Genus: Phtheochroa
- Species: P. procerana

Binomial name
- Phtheochroa procerana (Lederer, 1863)

Synonyms
- Conchylis procerana Lederer, 1863

= Phtheochroa procerana =

Species of moth

Phtheochroa procerana is a species of moth of the family Tortricidae. It is found in Bulgaria, Hungary, Romania and Turkey.

The wingspan is 14–16 mm. Adults have been recorded on wing from June to July.
