= Phtheochroa obnubila =

Scientific classification
- Kingdom: Animalia
- Phylum: Arthropoda
- Class: Insecta
- Order: Lepidoptera
- Family: Tortricidae
- Genus: Phtheochroa
- Species: P. obnubila

Binomial name
- Phtheochroa obnubila (Razowski, 1984)

Synonyms
- Trachysmia obnubila Razowski, 1984

Species of moth

Phtheochroa obnubila is a species of moth in the family Tortricidae. It is found in Hidalgo, Mexico.
