= Phtheochroa ochralana =

Scientific classification
- Domain: Eukaryota
- Kingdom: Animalia
- Phylum: Arthropoda
- Class: Insecta
- Order: Lepidoptera
- Family: Tortricidae
- Genus: Phtheochroa
- Species: P. ochralana

Binomial name
- Phtheochroa ochralana (Chretien, 1915)

Synonyms
- Euxanthis ochralana Chretien, 1915; Phalonia bedeella Lucas, 1946; Conchylis ochrolana Caradja, 1916

Species of moth

Phtheochroa ochralana is a species of moth of the family Tortricidae. It is found in Tunisia and on Malta.
