= Phtheochroa huachucana =

Scientific classification
- Domain: Eukaryota
- Kingdom: Animalia
- Phylum: Arthropoda
- Class: Insecta
- Order: Lepidoptera
- Family: Tortricidae
- Genus: Phtheochroa
- Species: P. huachucana

Binomial name
- Phtheochroa huachucana (Kearfott, 1907)

Synonyms
- Commophila huachucana Kearfott, 1907

Species of moth

Phtheochroa huachucana is a species of moth of the family Tortricidae. It is found in the United States, where it has been recorded from Arizona, New Mexico and western Texas.

The wingspan is 22–27 mm. Adults have been recorded on wing in August.
