= Phtheochroa agelasta =

Scientific classification
- Kingdom: Animalia
- Phylum: Arthropoda
- Class: Insecta
- Order: Lepidoptera
- Family: Tortricidae
- Genus: Phtheochroa
- Species: P. agelasta

Binomial name
- Phtheochroa agelasta (Razowski, 1967)

Synonyms
- Aethes agelasta Razowski, 1967

Species of moth

Phtheochroa agelasta is a species of moth of the family Tortricidae. It is found in Costa Rica.
