= Phtheochroa modestana =

Scientific classification
- Domain: Eukaryota
- Kingdom: Animalia
- Phylum: Arthropoda
- Class: Insecta
- Order: Lepidoptera
- Family: Tortricidae
- Genus: Phtheochroa
- Species: P. modestana

Binomial name
- Phtheochroa modestana (Busck, 1907)

Synonyms
- Hysterosia modestana Busck, 1907

Species of moth

Phtheochroa modestana, the modest phtheochroa moth, is a species of moth of the family Tortricidae. It is found in North America, where it has been recorded from Alberta, eastward across southern Canada. In the United States, it is found from Maine to Illinois and South Carolina.

The wingspan is 17–20 mm. Adults have been recorded on wing from June to September.
