= Phtheochroa schreieri =

Scientific classification
- Domain: Eukaryota
- Kingdom: Animalia
- Phylum: Arthropoda
- Class: Insecta
- Order: Lepidoptera
- Family: Tortricidae
- Genus: Phtheochroa
- Species: P. schreieri

Binomial name
- Phtheochroa schreieri Derra, 1992

Species of moth

Phtheochroa schreieri is a species of moth of the family Tortricidae. It is found in Turkey.
