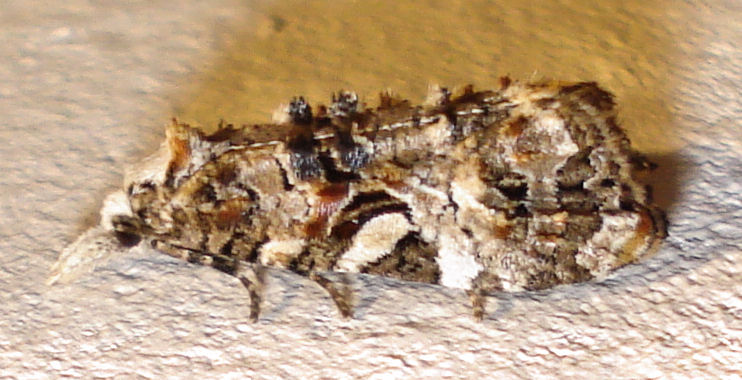
- Adult Phtheochroa rugosana from Lincolnshire, UK

Scientific classification
- Kingdom: Animalia
- Phylum: Arthropoda
- Clade: Pancrustacea
- Class: Insecta
- Order: Lepidoptera
- Family: Tortricidae
- Genus: Phtheochroa; Stephens, 1829

Type species
- Tortrix rugosana Hübner, [1799]

Diversity
- 100+ species

Synonyms
- Arce de Joannis, 1919; Durrantia Razowski, 1960 (non Busck 1908: preoccupied); Hysterosia Stephens, 1852; Idiographis Lederer, 1859; Parahysterosia Razowski, 1960; Phteochroa (lapsus); Propira Durrant, 1914; Ptheochroa (lapsus); Trachysmia Guenée, 1845

= Phtheochroa =

Genus of tortrix moths

Phtheochroa is a large genus of tortrix moths (family Tortricidae). It belongs to the tribe Cochylini of subfamily Tortricinae.

== Species ==
The currently recognized species of Phtheochroa are:

- Phtheochroa aarviki Razowski & J.W. Brown, 2012
- Phtheochroa aegrana (Walsingham, 1879)
- Phtheochroa agelasta (Razowski, 1967)
- Phtheochroa albiceps (Walsingham, 1914)
- Phtheochroa amphibola Razowski, 1994
- Phtheochroa annae Huemer, 1989
- Phtheochroa aureoalbida (Walsingham, 1895)
- Phtheochroa aureopunctana (Ragonot, 1894)
- Phtheochroa baracana (Busck, 1907)
- Phtheochroa birdana (Busck, 1907)
- Phtheochroa canariana (Barnes & Busck, 1920)
- Phtheochroa cartwrightana (Kearfott, 1907)
- Phtheochroa chalcantha (Meyrick, 1912)
- Phtheochroa chaunax Razowski, 1991
- Phtheochroa chlidantha Razowski, 1994
- Phtheochroa chriacta Razowski, 1991
- Phtheochroa chriodes Razowski, 1991
- Phtheochroa ciona Razowski, 1991
- Phtheochroa circina Razowski, 1991
- Phtheochroa cistobursa Razowski, 1991
- Phtheochroa cymatodana (Rebel, 1927)
- Phtheochroa decipiens (Walsingham, 1900)
- Phtheochroa deima Razowski, 1994
- Phtheochroa descensa Razowski, 1991
- Phtheochroa dodrantaria (Razowski, 1970)
- Phtheochroa drenowskyi (Rebel, 1916)
- Phtheochroa duponchelana (Duponchel in Godart, 1843)
- Phtheochroa durbonana (Lhomme, 1937)
- Phtheochroa ecballiella Huemer, 1989
- Phtheochroa eulabea Razowski, 1994
- Phtheochroa exasperantana (Christoph, 1872)
- Phtheochroa farinosana (Herrich-Schäffer, 1856)
- Phtheochroa faulkneri Razowski, 1991
- Phtheochroa frigidana (Guenee, 1845)
- Phtheochroa fulvicinctana (Constant, 1894)
- Phtheochroa fulviplicana (Walsingham, 1879)
- Phtheochroa gigantica (Busck, 1920)
- Phtheochroa gracillimana (Rebel, 1910)
- Phtheochroa huachucana (Kearfott, 1907)
- Phtheochroa hyboscia Razowski, 1991
- Phtheochroa hydnum Razowski, 1991
- Phtheochroa imitana Derra, 1992
- Phtheochroa ingridae Huemer, 1990
- Phtheochroa inopiana (Haworth, [1811])
- Phtheochroa iodes (Clarke, 1968)
- Phtheochroa issikii (Razowski, 1977)
- Phtheochroa jerichoana (Amsel, 1935)
- Phtheochroa johnibrowni Razowski, 1991
- Phtheochroa kenneli (Obraztsov, 1944)
- Phtheochroa kenyana Aarvik, 2010
- Phtheochroa krulikowskiji (Obraztsov, 1944)
- Phtheochroa larseni Huemer, 1990
- Phtheochroa lonnvei Aarvik, 2010
- Phtheochroa loricata (Razowski, 1984)
- Phtheochroa lucentana (Kennel, 1899)
- Phtheochroa melasma (Clarke, 1968)
- Phtheochroa meraca (Razowski, 1984)
- Phtheochroa modestana (Busck, 1907)
- Phtheochroa natalica Razowski, 2005
- Phtheochroa noctivaga (Razowski, 1984)
- Phtheochroa noema Razowski, 1991
- Phtheochroa obnubila (Razowski, 1984)
- Phtheochroa ochodea Razowski, 1991
- Phtheochroa ochralana (Chretien, 1915)
- Phtheochroa ochrobasana (Chretien, 1915)
- Phtheochroa osthelderi Huemer, 1989
- Phtheochroa palpana (Ragonot, 1894)
- Phtheochroa pecosana Kearfott, 1907
- Phtheochroa perspicuana (Barnes & Busck, 1920)
- Phtheochroa piptmachaeria Razowski, 1986
- Phtheochroa pistrinana (Erschoff, 1877)
- Phtheochroa primula (Walsingham, 1914)
- Phtheochroa procerana (Lederer, 1863)
- Phtheochroa pulvillana (Herrich-Schäffer, 1851)
- Phtheochroa purana (Guenee, 1845)
- Phtheochroa purissima (Osthelder, 1938)
- Phtheochroa quaesita (Razowski, 1984)
- Phtheochroa rafalskii Razowski, 1997
- Phtheochroa rectangulana (Chretien, 1915)
- Phtheochroa reisseri (Razowski, 1970)
- Phtheochroa retextana (Erschoff, 1874)
- Phtheochroa riscana (Kearfott, 1907)
- Phtheochroa rugosana
- Phtheochroa schreibersiana (Frölich, 1828)
- Phtheochroa schreieri Derra, 1992
- Phtheochroa simoniana (Staudinger, 1859)
- Phtheochroa sinecarina Huemer, 1989
- Phtheochroa sociana (Esartiya, 1988)
- Phtheochroa sodaliana (Haworth, [1811])
- Phtheochroa subfumida (Falkovitsh, 1963)
- Phtheochroa superbissima (Razowski, 1984)
- Phtheochroa syrtana Ragonot, 1888
- Phtheochroa terminana (Busck, 1907)
- Phtheochroa thiana (Staudinger, 1900)
- Phtheochroa tubulata Arenberger, 1997
- Phtheochroa undulata (Danilevsky in Danilevsky, Kuznetsov & Falkovitsh, 1962)
- Phtheochroa unionana (Kennel, 1900)
- Phtheochroa variolosana Christoph in Romanoff, 1887
- Phtheochroa veirsi Razowski, 1986
- Phtheochroa vicina (Walsingham, 1914)
- Phtheochroa villana (Busck, 1907)
- Phtheochroa vitellinana (Zeller, 1875)
- Phtheochroa vulneratana (Zetterstedt, 1839)
- Phtheochroa waracana (Kearfott, 1907)
- Phtheochroa weiserti Arenberger, 1997
- Phtheochroa zacualpana (Busck, 1913)
- Phtheochroa zerena Razowski & Becker, 1993
