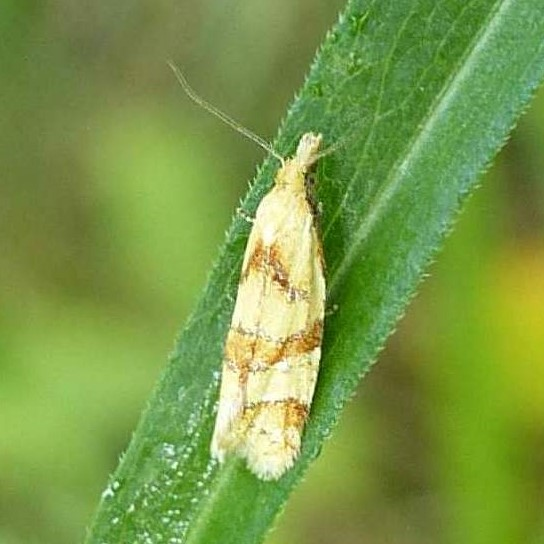
- Adult

Scientific classification
- Kingdom: Animalia
- Phylum: Arthropoda
- Clade: Pancrustacea
- Class: Insecta
- Order: Lepidoptera
- Family: Tortricidae
- Genus: Phtheochroa
- Species: P. vitellinana

Binomial name
- Phtheochroa vitellinana (Zeller, 1875)

Synonyms
- Conchylis vitellinana Zeller, 1875

= Phtheochroa vitellinana =

Species of moth

Phtheochroa vitellinana is a species of moth of the family Tortricidae. It is found in North America, where it has been recorded from Alberta, Maine, Ontario and Quebec.

Average wingspan is 12–13 mm. Adults have been recorded on wing from June to July.
