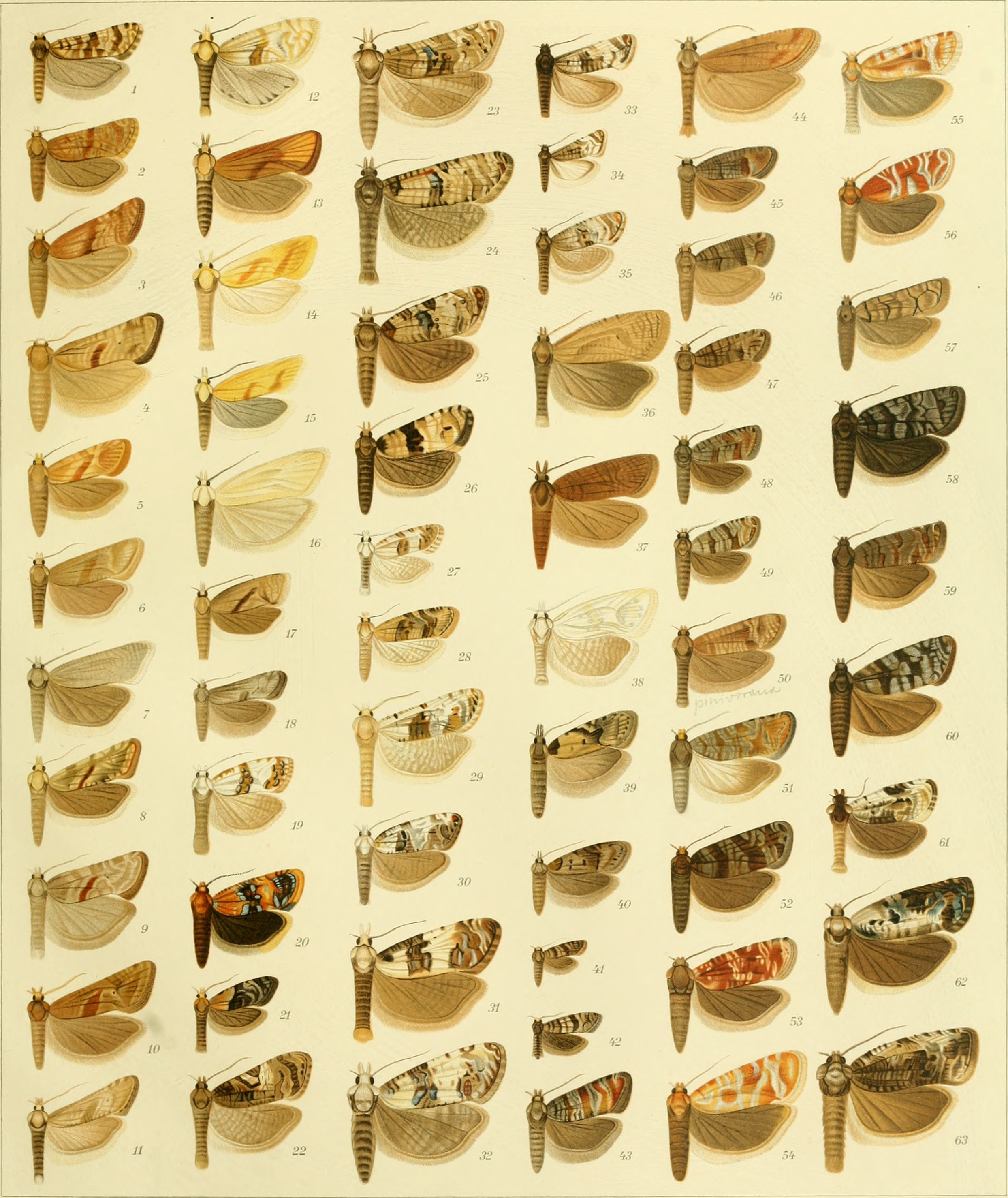
- Phtheochroa lucentana in Kennel Die palaearktischen tortriciden figure 14 male

Scientific classification
- Domain: Eukaryota
- Kingdom: Animalia
- Phylum: Arthropoda
- Class: Insecta
- Order: Lepidoptera
- Family: Tortricidae
- Genus: Phtheochroa
- Species: P. lucentana

Binomial name
- Phtheochroa lucentana (Kennel, 1899)

Synonyms
- Cochylis lucentana Kennel, 1899; Trachysmia lucentana

= Phtheochroa lucentana =

Species of moth

Phtheochroa lucentana is a species of moth of the family Tortricidae. It is found in northern Syria and Turkey.
