= Phtheochroa lonnvei =

Scientific classification
- Kingdom: Animalia
- Phylum: Arthropoda
- Class: Insecta
- Order: Lepidoptera
- Family: Tortricidae
- Genus: Phtheochroa
- Species: P. lonnvei

Binomial name
- Phtheochroa lonnvei Aarvik, 2010

Species of moth

Phtheochroa lonnvei is a species of moth of the family Tortricidae. It is found in Ethiopia.

The wingspan is about 25 mm.

== Etymology ==
The species is named in honour of Ole J. Lønnve.
