= Phtheochroa ecballiella =

Scientific classification
- Kingdom: Animalia
- Phylum: Arthropoda
- Clade: Pancrustacea
- Class: Insecta
- Order: Lepidoptera
- Family: Tortricidae
- Genus: Phtheochroa
- Species: P. ecballiella

Binomial name
- Phtheochroa ecballiella Huemer, 1989

Species of moth

Phtheochroa ecballiella is a species of moth of the family Tortricidae. It is found in Portugal, Spain and on the Canary Islands.

The wingspan is 15–21 mm. Adults have been recorded on wing from June to July.
