= Phtheochroa waracana =

Scientific classification
- Domain: Eukaryota
- Kingdom: Animalia
- Phylum: Arthropoda
- Class: Insecta
- Order: Lepidoptera
- Family: Tortricidae
- Genus: Phtheochroa
- Species: P. waracana

Binomial name
- Phtheochroa waracana (Kearfott, 1907)

Synonyms
- Hysterosia waracana Kearfott, 1907; Hysterosia dicax Meyrick, 1912

Species of moth

Phtheochroa waracana is a species of moth of the family Tortricidae. It is found in North America, where it has been recorded from Alberta, Arizona, California, Indiana, Maine, Manitoba, Ontario and Saskatchewan.

The wingspan is about 20 mm. Adults have been recorded on wing from June to August.
