= Phtheochroa vicina =

Scientific classification
- Domain: Eukaryota
- Kingdom: Animalia
- Phylum: Arthropoda
- Class: Insecta
- Order: Lepidoptera
- Family: Tortricidae
- Genus: Phtheochroa
- Species: P. vicina

Binomial name
- Phtheochroa vicina (Walsingham, 1914)

Synonyms
- Propira vicina Walsingham, 1914

Species of moth

Phtheochroa vicina is a species of moth of the family Tortricidae. It is found in Guatemala.
