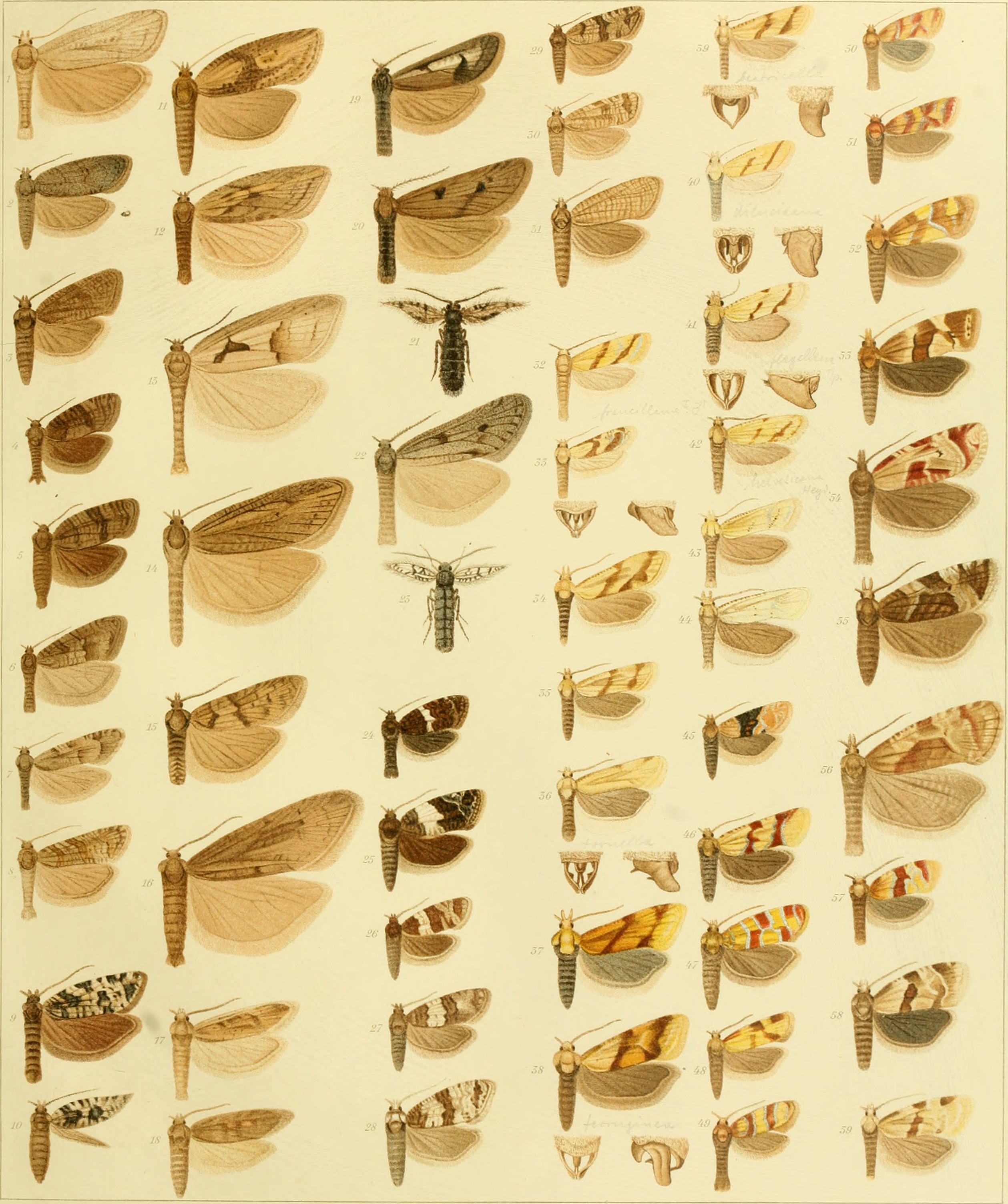
- Phtheochroa vulneratana in Die palaearktischen tortriciden(figures 54-56)

Scientific classification
- Domain: Eukaryota
- Kingdom: Animalia
- Phylum: Arthropoda
- Class: Insecta
- Order: Lepidoptera
- Family: Tortricidae
- Genus: Phtheochroa
- Species: P. vulneratana

Binomial name
- Phtheochroa vulneratana (Zetterstedt, 1839)

Synonyms
- Tortrix vulneratana Zetterstedt, 1839; Tortrix exsulana Lederer, 1855; Euxanthis meincki Amsel, 1932; Hysterosia niponica Kawabe, 1982; Phalonia vulneratana f. nipponica Matsumura, 1931

= Phtheochroa vulneratana =

Species of moth

Phtheochroa vulneratana is a species of moth of the family Tortricidae. It is found in Italy, Austria, Switzerland, Fennoscandia, Russia (Alai, Sajan, Irkutsk, Amur, Kamchatka, Transbaikal), the Pamir Mountains and Mongolia. It is also found in North America (from Alaska to British Columbia and south to Colorado) and Japan (Hokkaido, Honshu). The species is found in Arctic-alpine habitats.

The wingspan is 21–24 mm. Adults have been recorded on wing from June to August.
