= Phtheochroa simoniana =

Scientific classification
- Domain: Eukaryota
- Kingdom: Animalia
- Phylum: Arthropoda
- Class: Insecta
- Order: Lepidoptera
- Family: Tortricidae
- Genus: Phtheochroa
- Species: P. simoniana

Binomial name
- Phtheochroa simoniana (Staudinger, 1859)

Synonyms
- Cochylis simoniana Staudinger, 1859

Species of moth

Phtheochroa simoniana is a species of moth of the family Tortricidae. It is found in Italy, Spain, Portugal and Morocco.

The wingspan is 16–18 mm. Adults have been recorded on wing from February to March.
