= Phtheochroa aureoalbida =

Scientific classification
- Domain: Eukaryota
- Kingdom: Animalia
- Phylum: Arthropoda
- Class: Insecta
- Order: Lepidoptera
- Family: Tortricidae
- Genus: Phtheochroa
- Species: P. aureoalbida

Binomial name
- Phtheochroa aureoalbida (Walsingham, 1895)

Synonyms
- Hysterosia aureoalbida Walsingham, 1895

Species of moth

Phtheochroa aureoalbida is a species of moth of the family Tortricidae. It is found in North America, where it has been recorded from Alberta, British Columbia, Montana, Colorado and Saskatchewan.

The wingspan is 14–17 mm. Adults have been recorded on wing from June to July.
