= Phtheochroa dodrantaria =

Scientific classification
- Kingdom: Animalia
- Phylum: Arthropoda
- Clade: Pancrustacea
- Class: Insecta
- Order: Lepidoptera
- Family: Tortricidae
- Genus: Phtheochroa
- Species: P. dodrantaria

Binomial name
- Phtheochroa dodrantaria (Razowski, 1970)

Synonyms
- Hysterosia dodrantaria Razowski, 1970

Species of moth

Phtheochroa dodrantaria is a species of moth of the family Tortricidae. It is found in Lebanon, the Near East and on Cyprus.

== Discovery ==
This species was first discovered in 1970. It was primarily classified and described by a Polish entomologist named Józef Razowski under the original name Hysterosia dodrantaria before being reclassified to the genus Phtheochroa.
