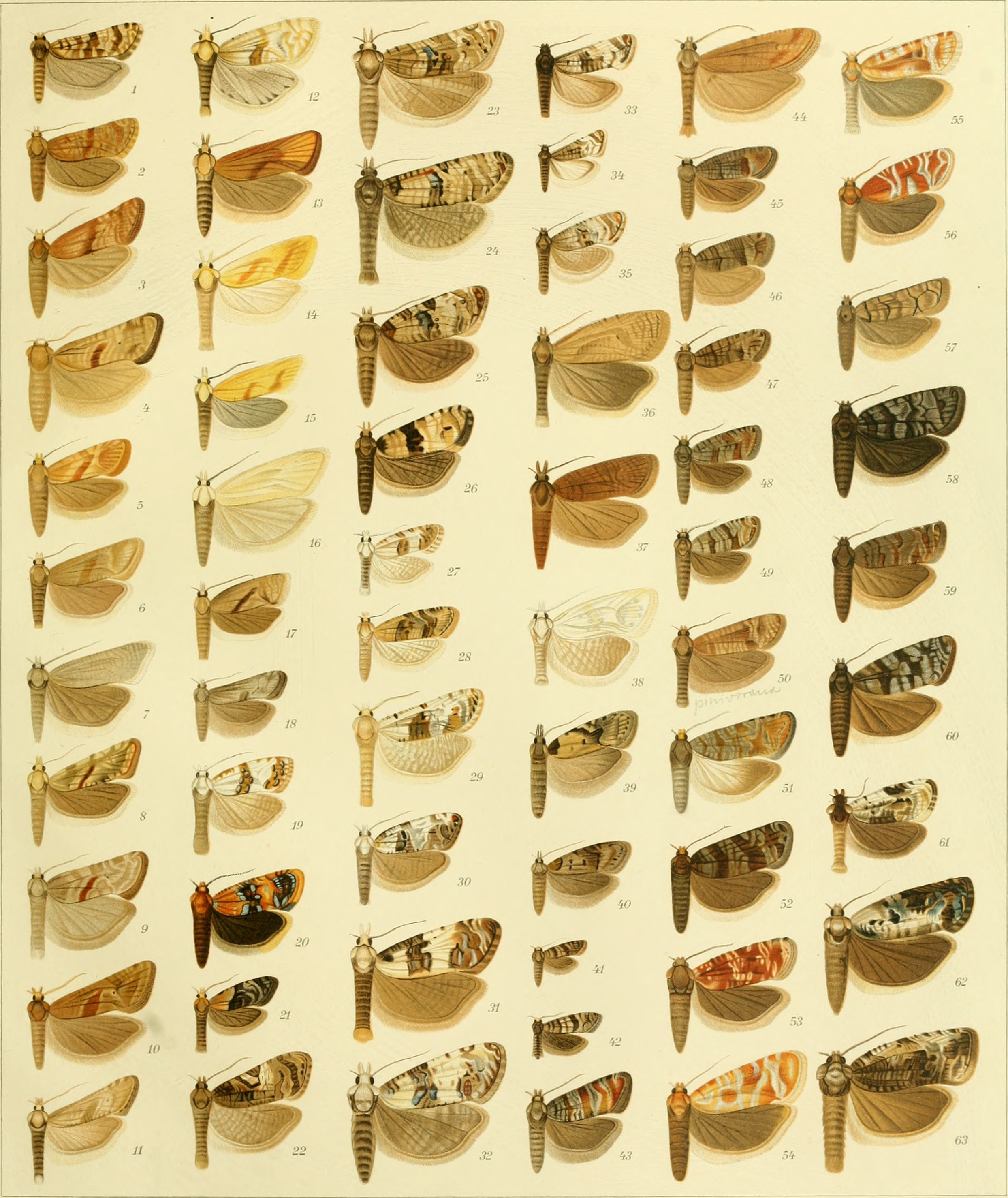
- Phtheochroa thiana in Kennel Die palaearktischen tortriciden figure 29 male

Scientific classification
- Domain: Eukaryota
- Kingdom: Animalia
- Phylum: Arthropoda
- Class: Insecta
- Order: Lepidoptera
- Family: Tortricidae
- Genus: Phtheochroa
- Species: P. thiana

Binomial name
- Phtheochroa thiana (Staudinger, 1900)

Synonyms
- Phtheochroa (Cochylis) thiana Staudinger, 1900; Phtheochroa dilectana Kennel, 1901

= Phtheochroa thiana =

Species of moth

Phtheochroa thiana is a species of moth of the family Tortricidae. It is found in Russia, in the Tian Shan mountains and in Asia Minor.
