= Phtheochroa ochodea =

Scientific classification
- Kingdom: Animalia
- Phylum: Arthropoda
- Class: Insecta
- Order: Lepidoptera
- Family: Tortricidae
- Genus: Phtheochroa
- Species: P. ochodea

Binomial name
- Phtheochroa ochodea Razowski, 1991

Synonyms
- Phtheochroa ochodes Razowski, in Heppner, 1995

Species of moth

Phtheochroa ochodea is a species of moth of the family Tortricidae. It is found in Durango, Mexico.
