= Phtheochroa kenneli =

Scientific classification
- Domain: Eukaryota
- Kingdom: Animalia
- Phylum: Arthropoda
- Class: Insecta
- Order: Lepidoptera
- Family: Tortricidae
- Genus: Phtheochroa
- Species: P. kenneli

Binomial name
- Phtheochroa kenneli (Obraztsov, 1944)

Synonyms
- Propira kenneli Obraztsov, 1944

Species of moth

Phtheochroa kenneli is a species of moth of the family Tortricidae. It is found in southern Ukraine, the south-eastern Urals, the Caucasus, the Near East and Iran.

The wingspan is about 16–17 mm. Adults have been recorded on wing from July to October.
