= Phtheochroa primula =

Scientific classification
- Domain: Eukaryota
- Kingdom: Animalia
- Phylum: Arthropoda
- Class: Insecta
- Order: Lepidoptera
- Family: Tortricidae
- Genus: Phtheochroa
- Species: P. primula

Binomial name
- Phtheochroa primula (Walsingham, 1914)

Synonyms
- Hysterosia primula Walsingham, 1914

Species of moth

Phtheochroa primula is a species of moth of the family Tortricidae. It is found in Mexico on Popocatépetl volcano.
