= Phtheochroa chalcantha =

Scientific classification
- Kingdom: Animalia
- Phylum: Arthropoda
- Class: Insecta
- Order: Lepidoptera
- Family: Tortricidae
- Genus: Phtheochroa
- Species: P. chalcantha

Binomial name
- Phtheochroa chalcantha (Meyrick, 1912)

Synonyms
- Pharmacis chalcantha Meyrick, 1912

Species of moth

Phtheochroa chalcantha is a species of moth of the family Tortricidae. It is found in the Near East and Russia.

The wingspan is 17–19 mm. The forewings are white, tinged with yellow. There is a suffused orange streak along the costa. The hindwings are light grey.
