= Phtheochroa tubulata =

Scientific classification
- Kingdom: Animalia
- Phylum: Arthropoda
- Class: Insecta
- Order: Lepidoptera
- Family: Tortricidae
- Genus: Phtheochroa
- Species: P. tubulata

Binomial name
- Phtheochroa tubulata Arenberger, 1997

Species of moth

Phtheochroa tubulata is a species of moth of the family Tortricidae. It is found in Uzbekistan.
