= Phtheochroa fulvicinctana =

Scientific classification
- Domain: Eukaryota
- Kingdom: Animalia
- Phylum: Arthropoda
- Class: Insecta
- Order: Lepidoptera
- Family: Tortricidae
- Genus: Phtheochroa
- Species: P. fulvicinctana

Binomial name
- Phtheochroa fulvicinctana (Constant, 1894)

Synonyms
- Cochylis fulvicinctana Constant, 1894

Species of moth

Phtheochroa fulvicinctana is a species of moth of the family Tortricidae. It is found in France, Italy, Albania, Croatia, Hungary, Romania and Ukraine.

The wingspan is 12–17 mm. Adults have been recorded on wing from August to September.

The larvae feed on Limonium vulgare.
