= Phtheochroa amphibola =

Scientific classification
- Kingdom: Animalia
- Phylum: Arthropoda
- Class: Insecta
- Order: Lepidoptera
- Family: Tortricidae
- Genus: Phtheochroa
- Species: P. amphibola

Binomial name
- Phtheochroa amphibola Razowski, 1994

Species of moth

Phtheochroa amphibola is a species of moth of the family Tortricidae. It is found in Puebla, Mexico.
