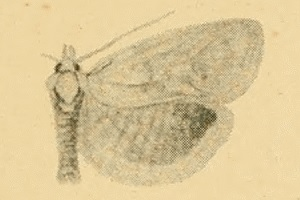

Scientific classification
- Domain: Eukaryota
- Kingdom: Animalia
- Phylum: Arthropoda
- Class: Insecta
- Order: Lepidoptera
- Family: Tortricidae
- Genus: Phtheochroa
- Species: P. unionana

Binomial name
- Phtheochroa unionana (Kennel, 1900)

Synonyms
- Hysterosia unionana Kennel, 1900

= Phtheochroa unionana =

Species of moth

Phtheochroa unionana is a species of moth of the family Tortricidae. It is found in Romania, the Near East and the Caucasus.

The wingspan is about 20 mm. Adults have been recorded on wing from June to July.
