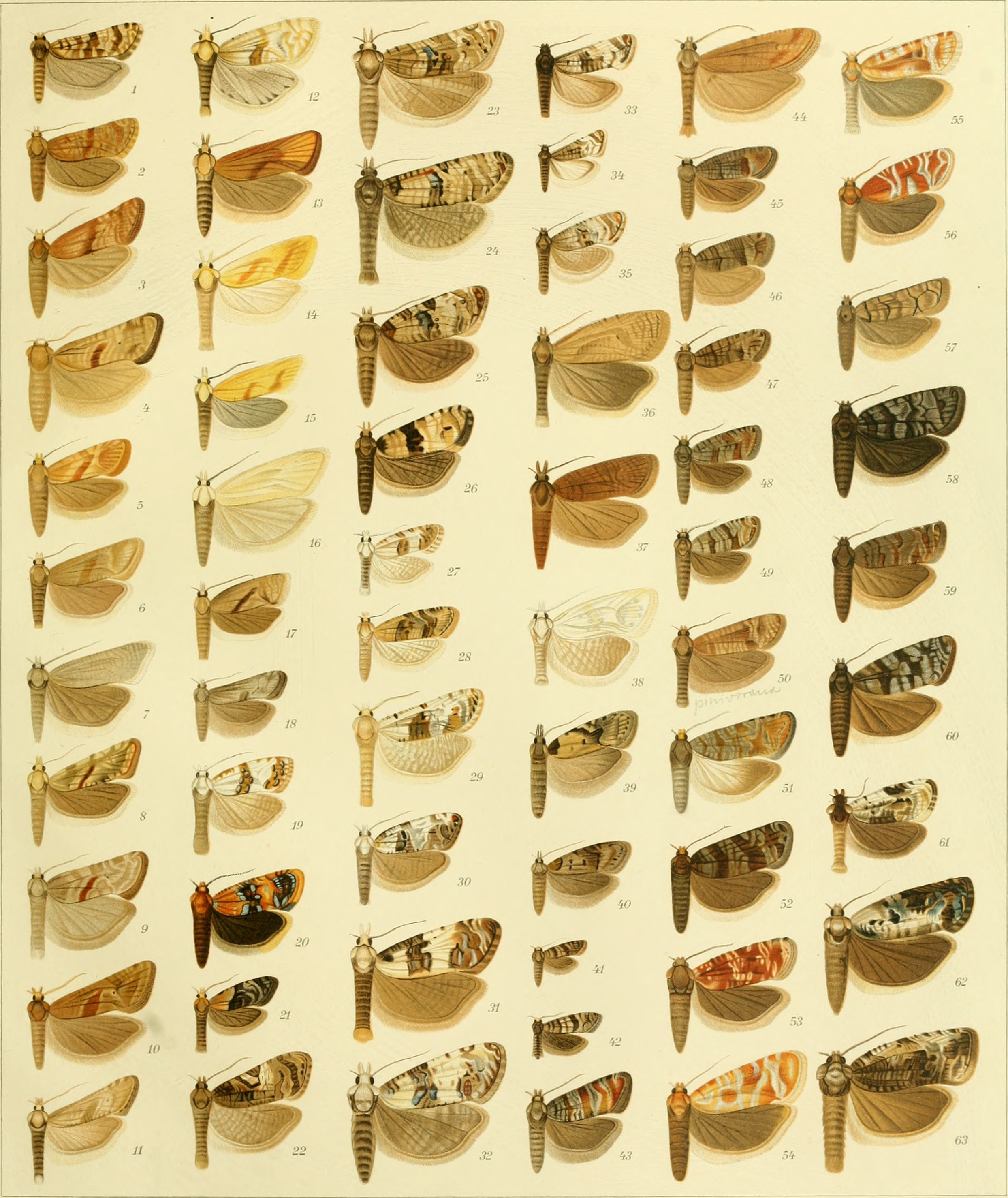
- Phtheochroa pistrinana in Kennel Die palaearktischen tortriciden figures 24 male, 25 female

Scientific classification
- Kingdom: Animalia
- Phylum: Arthropoda
- Clade: Pancrustacea
- Class: Insecta
- Order: Lepidoptera
- Family: Tortricidae
- Genus: Phtheochroa
- Species: P. pistrinana

Binomial name
- Phtheochroa pistrinana (Erschoff, 1877)

Synonyms
- Cochylis pistrinana Erschoff, 1877; Phtheochroa albiscutellum Walsingham, 1900; Hysterosia coreana Walsingham, 1900; Propira pistrinana heptopotamica Obraztsov, 1944

= Phtheochroa pistrinana =

Species of moth

Phtheochroa pistrinana is a species of moth of the family Tortricidae. It is found in China (Beijing, Jiangxi, Xizang, Gansu), Japan, Korea, Mongolia and the Russian Far East (Dsharkent, Minussinsk, Irkutsk, Amur).

== Appearance ==
Phtheochroa pistrinana is a small moth with a wingspan of approximately 15-22 mm. Its forewings have a distinctive pattern formed by a broad median band and a second submarginal band, creating contrasting transverse markings across the wing. It resembles Phtheochroa inopiana, although the latter generally has a more distinctly ochreous forewing pattern.
