= Phtheochroa drenowskyi =

Scientific classification
- Domain: Eukaryota
- Kingdom: Animalia
- Phylum: Arthropoda
- Class: Insecta
- Order: Lepidoptera
- Family: Tortricidae
- Genus: Phtheochroa
- Species: P. drenowskyi

Binomial name
- Phtheochroa drenowskyi (Rebel, 1916)

Synonyms
- Euxanthis drenowskyi Rebel, 1916; Phtheochroa drenowskii Razowski, 1991

Species of moth

Phtheochroa drenowskyi is a species of moth of the family Tortricidae. It is found in Albania, Bulgaria and Italy.

The wingspan is 15–16 mm. Adults have been recorded on wing in July.
