= Phtheochroa rectangulana =

Scientific classification
- Domain: Eukaryota
- Kingdom: Animalia
- Phylum: Arthropoda
- Class: Insecta
- Order: Lepidoptera
- Family: Tortricidae
- Genus: Phtheochroa
- Species: P. rectangulana

Binomial name
- Phtheochroa rectangulana (Chretien, 1915)

Synonyms
- Conchylis rectangulana Chretien, 1915

Species of moth

Phtheochroa rectangulana is a species of moth of the family Tortricidae. It is found on Malta and in Spain, Algeria and Tunisia.

The wingspan is 13–17 mm. Adults have been recorded on wing in October.
