= Phtheochroa perspicuana =

Scientific classification
- Domain: Eukaryota
- Kingdom: Animalia
- Phylum: Arthropoda
- Class: Insecta
- Order: Lepidoptera
- Family: Tortricidae
- Genus: Phtheochroa
- Species: P. perspicuana

Binomial name
- Phtheochroa perspicuana (Barnes & Busck, 1920)

Synonyms
- Hysterosia perspicuana Barnes & Busck, 1920

Species of moth

Phtheochroa perspicuana is a species of moth of the family Tortricidae first described by William Barnes and August Busck in 1920. It is found in the United States, where it has been recorded from Arizona and Texas.

The wingspan is about 23 mm. Adults have been recorded on wing in January and August.
