= Phtheochroa zacualpana =

Scientific classification
- Domain: Eukaryota
- Kingdom: Animalia
- Phylum: Arthropoda
- Class: Insecta
- Order: Lepidoptera
- Family: Tortricidae
- Genus: Phtheochroa
- Species: P. zacualpana

Binomial name
- Phtheochroa zacualpana (Busck, 1913)

Synonyms
- Commophila zacualpana Busck, 1913

Species of moth

Phtheochroa zacualpana is a species of the moth family Tortricidae. It is found in the Federal District of Mexico.
