= Phtheochroa undulata =

Scientific classification
- Kingdom: Animalia
- Phylum: Arthropoda
- Clade: Pancrustacea
- Class: Insecta
- Order: Lepidoptera
- Family: Tortricidae
- Genus: Phtheochroa
- Species: P. undulata

Binomial name
- Phtheochroa undulata (Danilevsky in Danilevsky, Kuznetsov & Falkovitsh, 1962)

Synonyms
- Hysterosia undulata Danilevsky in Danilevsky, Kuznetsov & Falkovitsh, 1962; Phtheochroa uighurica Kemal & Koçak, 2004

Species of moth

Phtheochroa undulata is a species of moth of the family Tortricidae. It is found in the Ala-Tau mountains of Central Asia.
