= Phtheochroa ingridae =

Scientific classification
- Kingdom: Animalia
- Phylum: Arthropoda
- Clade: Pancrustacea
- Class: Insecta
- Order: Lepidoptera
- Family: Tortricidae
- Genus: Phtheochroa
- Species: P. ingridae

Binomial name
- Phtheochroa ingridae Huemer, 1990

Species of moth

Phtheochroa ingridae is a species of moth of the family Tortricidae. It is found in Italy.

The wingspan is 18–22 mm. Adults have been recorded on wing in May.

The larvae feed on Bryonia dioica.
