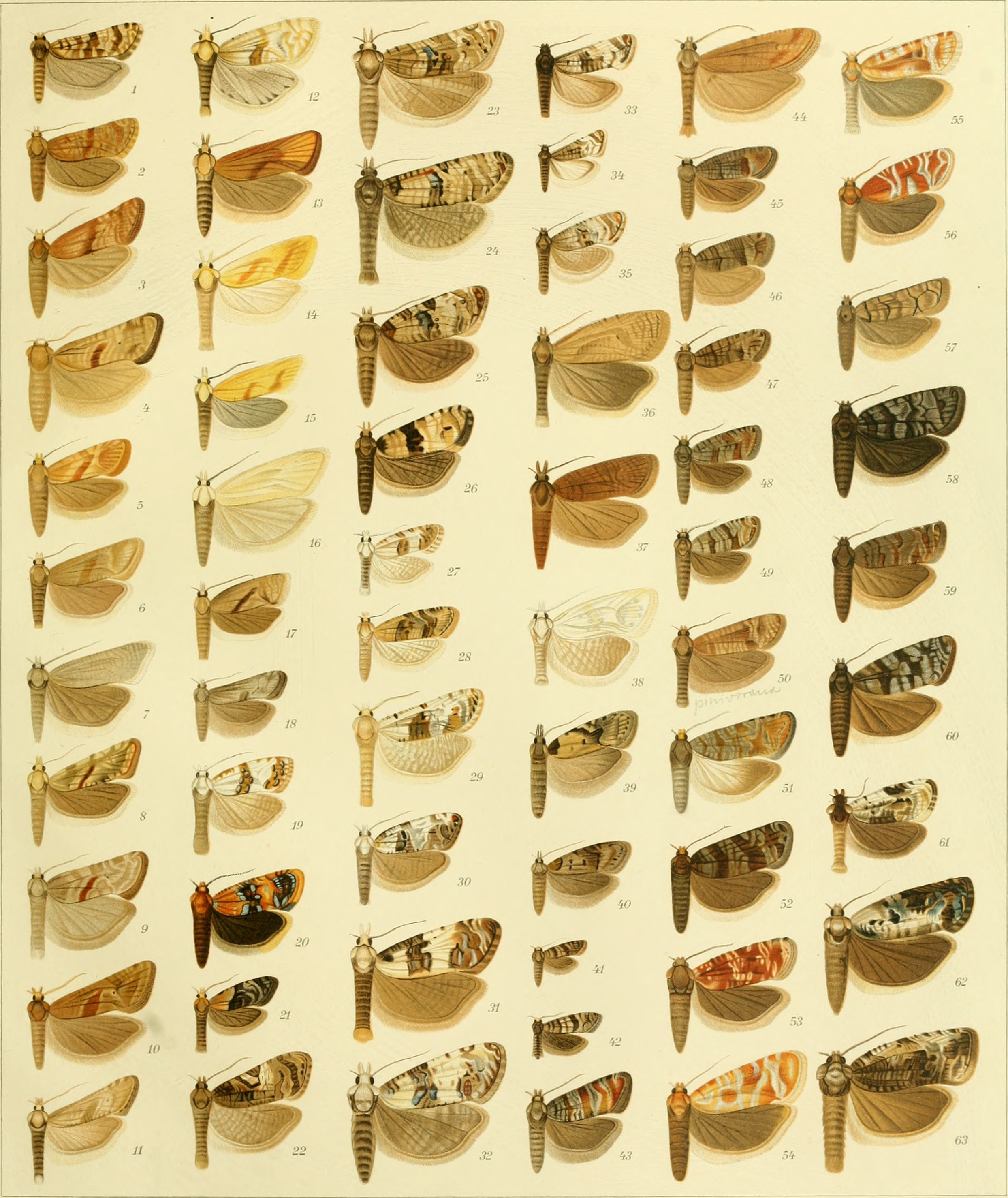
- Phtheochroa ochrobasana in Kennel Die palaearktischen tortriciden figure 28 female

Scientific classification
- Domain: Eukaryota
- Kingdom: Animalia
- Phylum: Arthropoda
- Class: Insecta
- Order: Lepidoptera
- Family: Tortricidae
- Genus: Phtheochroa
- Species: P. ochrobasana

Binomial name
- Phtheochroa ochrobasana (Chretien, 1915)

Synonyms
- Euxanthis ochrobasana Chretien, 1915; Argyrotoxa undulata Lucas, 1946

= Phtheochroa ochrobasana =

Species of moth

Phtheochroa ochrobasana is a species of moth of the family Tortricidae. It is found in Spain, Algeria and Saudi Arabia.

The wingspan is 15–17 mm. Adults have been recorded on wing from October to November.
