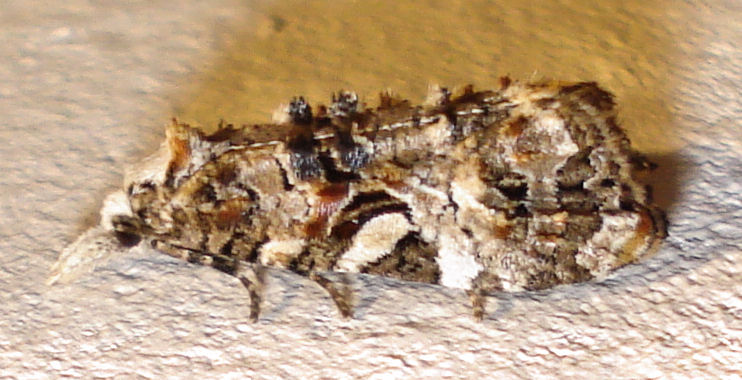
- Adult from Lincolnshire, UK

Scientific classification
- Kingdom: Animalia
- Phylum: Arthropoda
- Clade: Pancrustacea
- Class: Insecta
- Order: Lepidoptera
- Family: Tortricidae
- Genus: Phtheochroa
- Species: P. rugosana

Binomial name
- Phtheochroa rugosana (Hübner, [1799])

Synonyms
- See text

= Phtheochroa rugosana =

Species of moth

Phtheochroa rugosana is a small moth of the family Tortricidae.

It is found in western Europe (Iberian Peninsula, France and the British Isles) east to the Benelux, Switzerland and Italy, and further across the Balkans and Hungary to Asia Minor and Armenia. It also occurs in the Maghreb (possibly excluding Tunisia) and on the Canary Islands.

The wingspan is 18–23 mm. Adults are on wing from May to July. There is one generation per year.

The caterpillars feed on red bryony (Bryonia dioica) and probably also squirting cucumber (Ecballium elaterium). More unusually, they have been recorded eating rotting wood.

== Synonyms ==
Obsolete scientific names for this species are:

- Tortrix rugosana Hübner, [1799]
- Commophila rugosana (Hübner, [1799])
- Phalaena v-albana Donovan, 1806
- Phalonia albana Kennel, 1913
