= Phtheochroa rafalskii =

Scientific classification
- Kingdom: Animalia
- Phylum: Arthropoda
- Class: Insecta
- Order: Lepidoptera
- Family: Tortricidae
- Genus: Phtheochroa
- Species: P. rafalskii

Binomial name
- Phtheochroa rafalskii Razowski, 1997

Species of moth

Phtheochroa rafalskii is a species of moth of the family Tortricidae. It is found in Durango, Mexico.
