= Phtheochroa purana =

Scientific classification
- Kingdom: Animalia
- Phylum: Arthropoda
- Class: Insecta
- Order: Lepidoptera
- Family: Tortricidae
- Genus: Phtheochroa
- Species: P. purana

Binomial name
- Phtheochroa purana (Guenee, 1845)

Synonyms
- Argyrolepia purana Guenee, 1845; Tortrix limbatana Herrich-Schaffer, 1847; Tortrix (Cochylis) limbatana Herrich-Schaffer, 1851

Species of moth

Phtheochroa purana is a species of moth of the family Tortricidae. It is found in France, Italy, Croatia, Bosnia and Herzegovina, Hungary, Romania and Asia Minor.

The wingspan is 14–16 mm. Adults have been recorded on wing from June to July.

The larvae feed on Cephalaria leucantha.
