= Phtheochroa ciona =

Scientific classification
- Kingdom: Animalia
- Phylum: Arthropoda
- Class: Insecta
- Order: Lepidoptera
- Family: Tortricidae
- Genus: Phtheochroa
- Species: P. ciona

Binomial name
- Phtheochroa ciona Razowski, 1991

Species of moth

Phtheochroa ciona is a species of moth of the family Tortricidae. It is found in Nayarit, Mexico.
