= Phtheochroa circina =

Scientific classification
- Kingdom: Animalia
- Phylum: Arthropoda
- Class: Insecta
- Order: Lepidoptera
- Family: Tortricidae
- Genus: Phtheochroa
- Species: P. circina

Binomial name
- Phtheochroa circina Razowski, 1991

Species of moth

Phtheochroa circina is a species of moth of the family Tortricidae. It is found in Sinaloa, Mexico.
