= Phtheochroa pecosana =

Scientific classification
- Kingdom: Animalia
- Phylum: Arthropoda
- Class: Insecta
- Order: Lepidoptera
- Family: Tortricidae
- Genus: Phtheochroa
- Species: P. pecosana

Binomial name
- Phtheochroa pecosana Kearfott, 1907

Synonyms
- Hysterosia pecosana

Species of moth

Phtheochroa pecosana is a species of moth of the family Tortricidae. It is found in the United States, where it has been recorded from Arizona, California, Colorado and New Mexico.
