= Phtheochroa jerichoana =

Scientific classification
- Domain: Eukaryota
- Kingdom: Animalia
- Phylum: Arthropoda
- Class: Insecta
- Order: Lepidoptera
- Family: Tortricidae
- Genus: Phtheochroa
- Species: P. jerichoana

Binomial name
- Phtheochroa jerichoana (Amsel, 1935)

Synonyms
- Phalonia jerichoana Amsel, 1935

Species of moth

Phtheochroa jerichoana is a species of moth of the family Tortricidae. It is found in Palestine, Saudi Arabia, Bahrain and Iran (Laristan).
