= Phtheochroa piptmachaeria =

Scientific classification
- Kingdom: Animalia
- Phylum: Arthropoda
- Class: Insecta
- Order: Lepidoptera
- Family: Tortricidae
- Genus: Phtheochroa
- Species: P. piptmachaeria

Binomial name
- Phtheochroa piptmachaeria Razowski, 1986

Species of moth

Phtheochroa piptmachaeria is a species of moth of the family Tortricidae. It is found in Durango, Mexico.
