= Phtheochroa iodes =

Scientific classification
- Domain: Eukaryota
- Kingdom: Animalia
- Phylum: Arthropoda
- Class: Insecta
- Order: Lepidoptera
- Family: Tortricidae
- Genus: Phtheochroa
- Species: P. iodes

Binomial name
- Phtheochroa iodes (Clarke, 1968)

Synonyms
- Hysterosia iodes Clarke, 1968

Species of moth

Phtheochroa iodes is a species of moth of the family Tortricidae. It is found in Guatemala.
