= Phtheochroa chlidantha =

Scientific classification
- Kingdom: Animalia
- Phylum: Arthropoda
- Class: Insecta
- Order: Lepidoptera
- Family: Tortricidae
- Genus: Phtheochroa
- Species: P. chlidantha

Binomial name
- Phtheochroa chlidantha Razowski, 1994

Species of moth

Phtheochroa chlidantha is a species of moth of the family Tortricidae. It is found in Oaxaca, Mexico.
