= Phtheochroa zerena =

Scientific classification
- Kingdom: Animalia
- Phylum: Arthropoda
- Clade: Pancrustacea
- Class: Insecta
- Order: Lepidoptera
- Family: Tortricidae
- Genus: Phtheochroa
- Species: P. zerena

Binomial name
- Phtheochroa zerena Razowski & Becker, 1993

Species of moth

Phtheochroa zerena is a species of moth of the family Tortricidae. It is found in Veracruz, Mexico.
