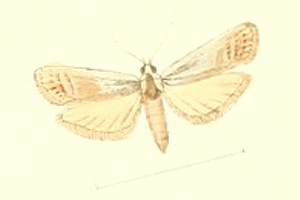

Scientific classification
- Domain: Eukaryota
- Kingdom: Animalia
- Phylum: Arthropoda
- Class: Insecta
- Order: Lepidoptera
- Family: Tortricidae
- Genus: Phtheochroa
- Species: P. retextana

Binomial name
- Phtheochroa retextana (Erschoff, 1874)

Synonyms
- Conchylis retextana Erschoff, 1874

= Phtheochroa retextana =

Species of moth

Phtheochroa retextana is a species of moth of the family Tortricidae. It is found in the Caucasus, Daghestan and Central Asia.

The wingspan is about 18 mm.
