= Phtheochroa cartwrightana =

Scientific classification
- Domain: Eukaryota
- Kingdom: Animalia
- Phylum: Arthropoda
- Class: Insecta
- Order: Lepidoptera
- Family: Tortricidae
- Genus: Phtheochroa
- Species: P. cartwrightana

Binomial name
- Phtheochroa cartwrightana (Kearfott, 1907)

Synonyms
- Hysterosia cartwrightana Kearfott, 1907

Species of moth

Phtheochroa cartwrightana is a species of moth of the family Tortricidae. It is found in North America, where it has been recorded from Manitoba, Maine and Ohio.
