= Phtheochroa farinosana =

Scientific classification
- Domain: Eukaryota
- Kingdom: Animalia
- Phylum: Arthropoda
- Class: Insecta
- Order: Lepidoptera
- Family: Tortricidae
- Genus: Phtheochroa
- Species: P. farinosana

Binomial name
- Phtheochroa farinosana (Herrich-Schäffer, 1856)

Synonyms
- Conchylis farinosana Herrich-Schäffer, 1856

Species of moth

Phtheochroa farinosana is a species of moth of the family Tortricidae. It is found in southern Russia (Sarepta, Uralsk).

The wingspan is 17–20 mm. Adults have been recorded on wing in June and September.
