= Phtheochroa decipiens =

Scientific classification
- Domain: Eukaryota
- Kingdom: Animalia
- Phylum: Arthropoda
- Class: Insecta
- Order: Lepidoptera
- Family: Tortricidae
- Genus: Phtheochroa
- Species: P. decipiens

Binomial name
- Phtheochroa decipiens (Walsingham, 1900)

Synonyms
- Hysterosia decipiens Walsingham, 1900; Phtheochroa berberidana Danilevsky, 1955; Hysterosia rocharva Obraztsov, 1943

Species of moth

Phtheochroa decipiens is a species of moth of the family Tortricidae. It is found in Russia (the southern Ural Mountains, the Caucasus), Syria, Central Asia and Iran.

The wingspan is 14–18 mm. Adults have been recorded on wing from June to August.

The larvae feed on Berberis species.
