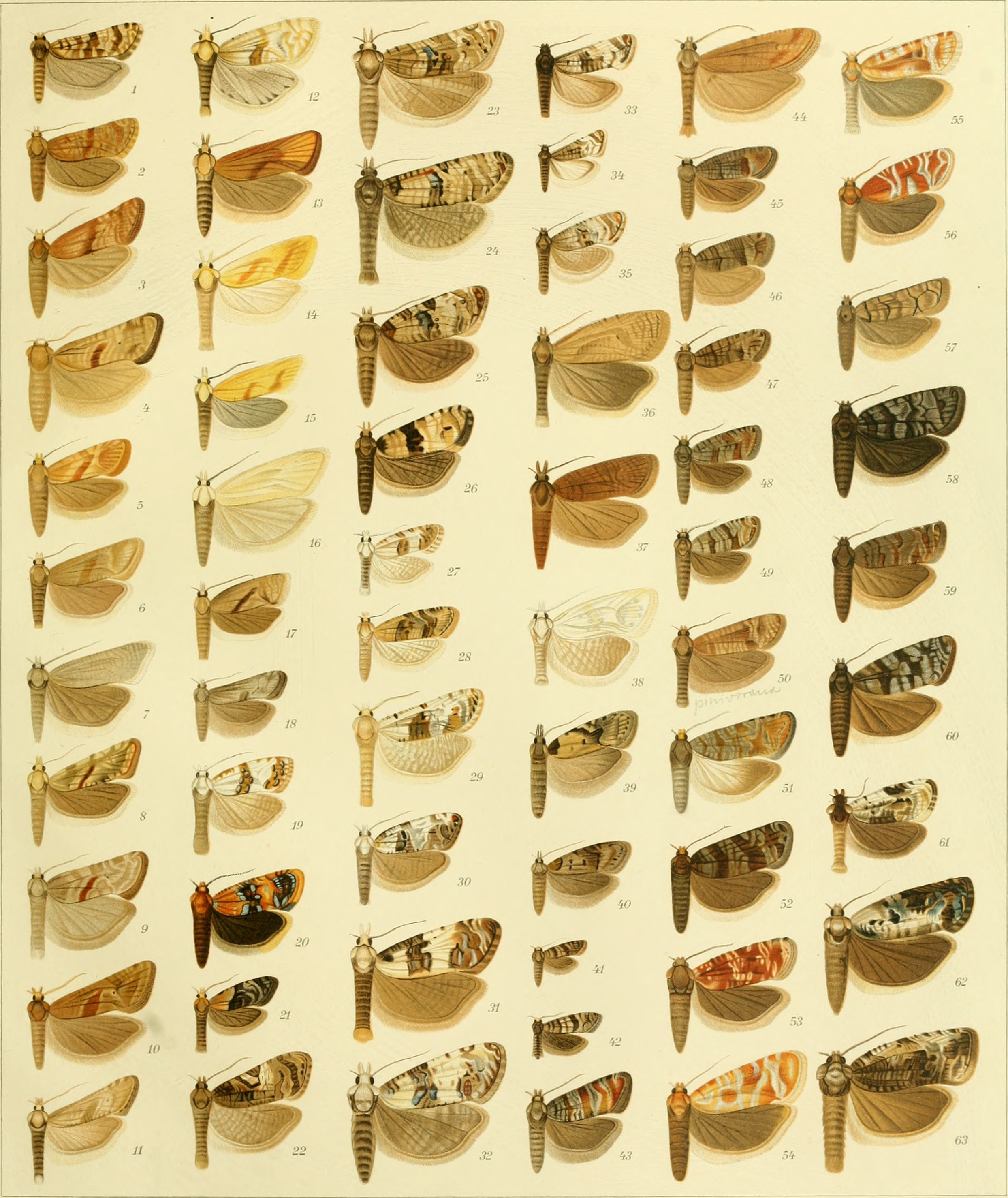
- Phtheochroa variolosana in Kennel Die palaearktischen tortriciden figure 23 female

Scientific classification
- Domain: Eukaryota
- Kingdom: Animalia
- Phylum: Arthropoda
- Class: Insecta
- Order: Lepidoptera
- Family: Tortricidae
- Genus: Phtheochroa
- Species: P. variolosana

Binomial name
- Phtheochroa variolosana Christoph, 1887

= Phtheochroa variolosana =

Species of moth

Phtheochroa variolosana is a species of moth of the family Tortricidae. It is found in western Turkestan, Central Asia, Afghanistan and Iran.
