= Phtheochroa natalica =

Scientific classification
- Kingdom: Animalia
- Phylum: Arthropoda
- Class: Insecta
- Order: Lepidoptera
- Family: Tortricidae
- Genus: Phtheochroa
- Species: P. natalica

Binomial name
- Phtheochroa natalica Razowski, 2005

Species of moth

Phtheochroa natalica is a species of moth of the family Tortricidae. It is found in South Africa.
