= Phtheochroa deima =

Scientific classification
- Kingdom: Animalia
- Phylum: Arthropoda
- Class: Insecta
- Order: Lepidoptera
- Family: Tortricidae
- Genus: Phtheochroa
- Species: P. deima

Binomial name
- Phtheochroa deima Razowski, 1994

Species of moth

Phtheochroa deima is a species of moth of the family Tortricidae. It is found in the State of Mexico in Mexico.
