= Phtheochroa birdana =

Scientific classification
- Domain: Eukaryota
- Kingdom: Animalia
- Phylum: Arthropoda
- Class: Insecta
- Order: Lepidoptera
- Family: Tortricidae
- Genus: Phtheochroa
- Species: P. birdana

Binomial name
- Phtheochroa birdana (Busck, 1907)

Synonyms
- Hysterosia birdana Busck, 1907

Species of moth

Phtheochroa birdana is a species of moth of the family Tortricidae. It is found in North America, where it has been recorded from New York to Florida and from Illinois to Texas. It has also been recorded from Ontario.

The wingspan is about 27 mm. Adults have been recorded on wing from June to September, but also in October in Florida.

The larvae feed on Helianthus species and Rudbeckia laciniata. They bore into the roots of the host plant.
