= Phtheochroa descensa =

Scientific classification
- Kingdom: Animalia
- Phylum: Arthropoda
- Class: Insecta
- Order: Lepidoptera
- Family: Tortricidae
- Genus: Phtheochroa
- Species: P. descensa

Binomial name
- Phtheochroa descensa Razowski, 1991

Species of moth

Phtheochroa descensa is a species of moth of the family Tortricidae. It lives in Jalisco, Mexico.
