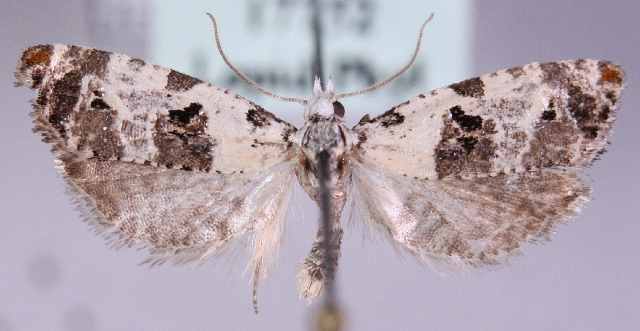

Scientific classification
- Kingdom: Animalia
- Phylum: Arthropoda
- Clade: Pancrustacea
- Class: Insecta
- Order: Lepidoptera
- Family: Tortricidae
- Genus: Phtheochroa
- Species: P. sodaliana

Binomial name
- Phtheochroa sodaliana (Haworth, [1811])

Synonyms
- Tortrix sodaliana Haworth, [1811]; Tortrix (Phtheochroa) amandana Herrich-Schaffer, 1851

= Phtheochroa sodaliana =

Species of moth

Phtheochroa sodaliana, the buckthorn conch, is a species of moth of the family Tortricidae. It is found in most of Europe (except the Iberian Peninsula and part of the Balkan Peninsula) and in Russia (Uralsk) and Lebanon. The habitat consists of dry pastures, heathland and fens.

The wingspan is 14–17 mm.

Adults have been recorded on wing from May to June.

The larvae feed on Rhamnus cathartica and Frangula alnus. They spin the berries together.
