= Phtheochroa baracana =

Scientific classification
- Domain: Eukaryota
- Kingdom: Animalia
- Phylum: Arthropoda
- Class: Insecta
- Order: Lepidoptera
- Family: Tortricidae
- Genus: Phtheochroa
- Species: P. baracana

Binomial name
- Phtheochroa baracana (Busck, 1907)

Synonyms
- Hysterosia baracana Busck, 1907; Hysterosia tiscana Kearfott, 1907; Hysterosia vigilans Meyrick, 1912

Species of moth

Phtheochroa baracana is a species of moth of the family Tortricidae. It is found in North America, where it has been recorded from New Jersey, Missouri, Alberta, Illinois, Indiana, Kentucky, Maine, Ohio, Pennsylvania and Vermont.

The wingspan is 14–18 mm. Adults have been recorded on wing from June to August.
