= Phtheochroa melasma =

Scientific classification
- Kingdom: Animalia
- Phylum: Arthropoda
- Class: Insecta
- Order: Lepidoptera
- Family: Tortricidae
- Genus: Phtheochroa
- Species: P. melasma

Binomial name
- Phtheochroa melasma (Clarke, 1968)

Synonyms
- Hysterosia melasma Clarke, 1968

Species of moth

Phtheochroa melasma is a species of moth of the family Tortricidae. It is known from Guatemala.

The wingspan is 22–24 mm (0.87–0.94 in). Adults have been observed in June.
