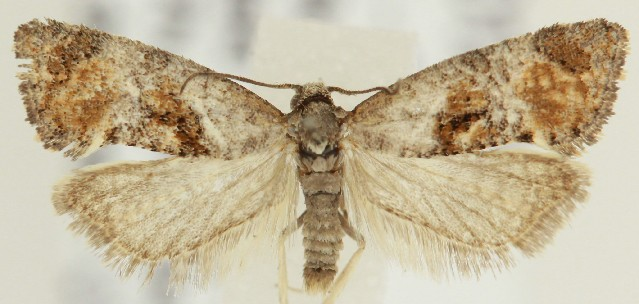

Scientific classification
- Domain: Eukaryota
- Kingdom: Animalia
- Phylum: Arthropoda
- Class: Insecta
- Order: Lepidoptera
- Family: Tortricidae
- Genus: Phtheochroa
- Species: P. terminana

Binomial name
- Phtheochroa terminana (Busck, 1907)

Synonyms
- Hysterosia terminana Busck, 1907; Hysterosia merrickana Kearfott, 1907

= Phtheochroa terminana =

Species of moth

Phtheochroa terminana is a species of moth of the family Tortricidae. It is found in the United States, where it has been recorded from Connecticut, Illinois, Indiana, Massachusetts, North Carolina, Ohio, Pennsylvania and Tennessee.

The wingspan is 19–22 mm. Adults have been recorded on wing from June to September.
