= Phtheochroa reisseri =

Scientific classification
- Kingdom: Animalia
- Phylum: Arthropoda
- Class: Insecta
- Order: Lepidoptera
- Family: Tortricidae
- Genus: Phtheochroa
- Species: P. reisseri

Binomial name
- Phtheochroa reisseri (Razowski, 1970)

Synonyms
- Hysterosia reisseri Razowski, 1970

Species of moth

Phtheochroa reisseri is a species of moth of the family Tortricidae. It is found on Crete.

The wingspan is 12–14 mm. Adults have been recorded on wing in May.
