= Phtheochroa durbonana =

Scientific classification
- Domain: Eukaryota
- Kingdom: Animalia
- Phylum: Arthropoda
- Class: Insecta
- Order: Lepidoptera
- Family: Tortricidae
- Genus: Phtheochroa
- Species: P. durbonana

Binomial name
- Phtheochroa durbonana (Lhomme, 1937)

Synonyms
- Phalonia durbonana Lhomme, 1937

Species of moth

Phtheochroa durbonana is a species of moth of the family Tortricidae. It is found in the western Alps and Iran.

The wingspan is about 20 mm. Adults have been recorded on wing in July.
