= Phtheochroa larseni =

Scientific classification
- Kingdom: Animalia
- Phylum: Arthropoda
- Clade: Pancrustacea
- Class: Insecta
- Order: Lepidoptera
- Family: Tortricidae
- Genus: Phtheochroa
- Species: P. larseni

Binomial name
- Phtheochroa larseni Huemer, 1990

Species of moth

Phtheochroa larseni is a species of moth of the family Tortricidae. It is found in Turkey.
