= Phtheochroa krulikowskiji =

Scientific classification
- Kingdom: Animalia
- Phylum: Arthropoda
- Clade: Pancrustacea
- Class: Insecta
- Order: Lepidoptera
- Family: Tortricidae
- Genus: Phtheochroa
- Species: P. krulikowskiji

Binomial name
- Phtheochroa krulikowskiji (Obraztsov, 1944)

Synonyms
- Propira krulikowskiji Obraztsov, 1944; Phtheochroa krulikovskiji; Phalonia kazakhstanica Danilevsky, in Danilevsky, Kuznetzov & Falkovitsh, 1962; Phalonia kazakhstanika Danilevsky, in Danilevsky, Kuznetzov & Falkovitsh, 1962

Species of moth

Phtheochroa krulikowskiji is a species of moth of the family Tortricidae. It is found in Russia, Kazakhstan, Turkmenistan, Kyrgyzstan and Mongolia.

The wingspan is 17–20 mm. Adults have been recorded on wing from August to October.

The larvae feed on Nanophyton caspicum.
