= Phtheochroa cymatodana =

Scientific classification
- Domain: Eukaryota
- Kingdom: Animalia
- Phylum: Arthropoda
- Class: Insecta
- Order: Lepidoptera
- Family: Tortricidae
- Genus: Phtheochroa
- Species: P. cymatodana

Binomial name
- Phtheochroa cymatodana (Rebel, 1927)

Synonyms
- Conchylis (Phalonia) cymatodana Rebel, 1927; Phalonia (Conchylis) hermosa Schmidt, 1933

Species of moth

Phtheochroa cymatodana is a species of moth of the family Tortricidae. It is found in France and Spain.

The wingspan is about 19 mm. Adults have been recorded on wing from May to June.
