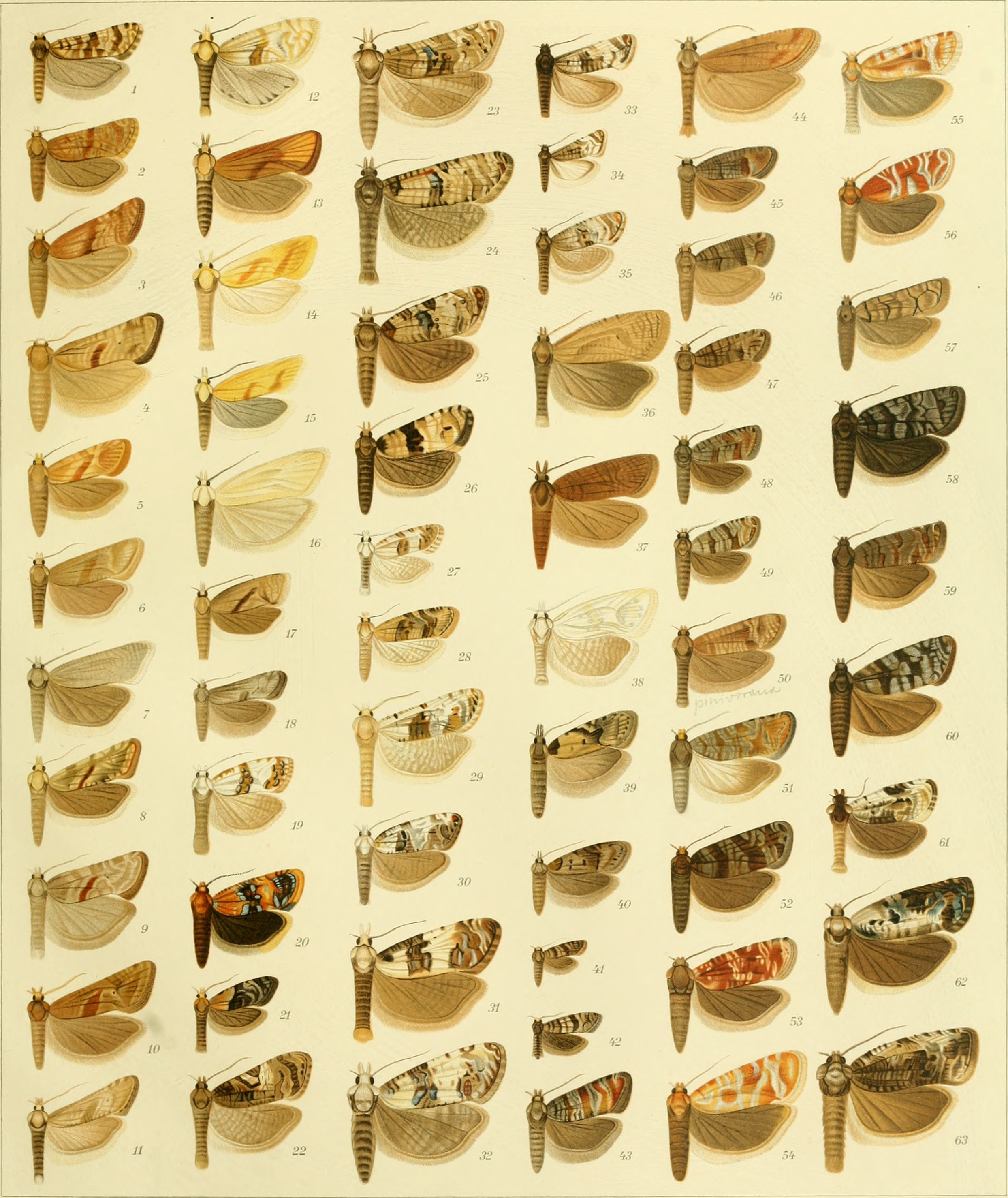
- Phtheochroa aureopunctana in Kennel Die palaearktischen tortriciden figure 19 male

Scientific classification
- Domain: Eukaryota
- Kingdom: Animalia
- Phylum: Arthropoda
- Class: Insecta
- Order: Lepidoptera
- Family: Tortricidae
- Genus: Phtheochroa
- Species: P. aureopunctana

Binomial name
- Phtheochroa aureopunctana (Ragonot, 1894)

Synonyms
- Conchylis aureopunctana Ragonot, 1894

= Phtheochroa aureopunctana =

Species of moth

Phtheochroa aureopunctana is a species of moth of the family Tortricidae. It is found mainly in the Middle East: namely Turkey, Lebanon, Palestine, Iran and Syria.
