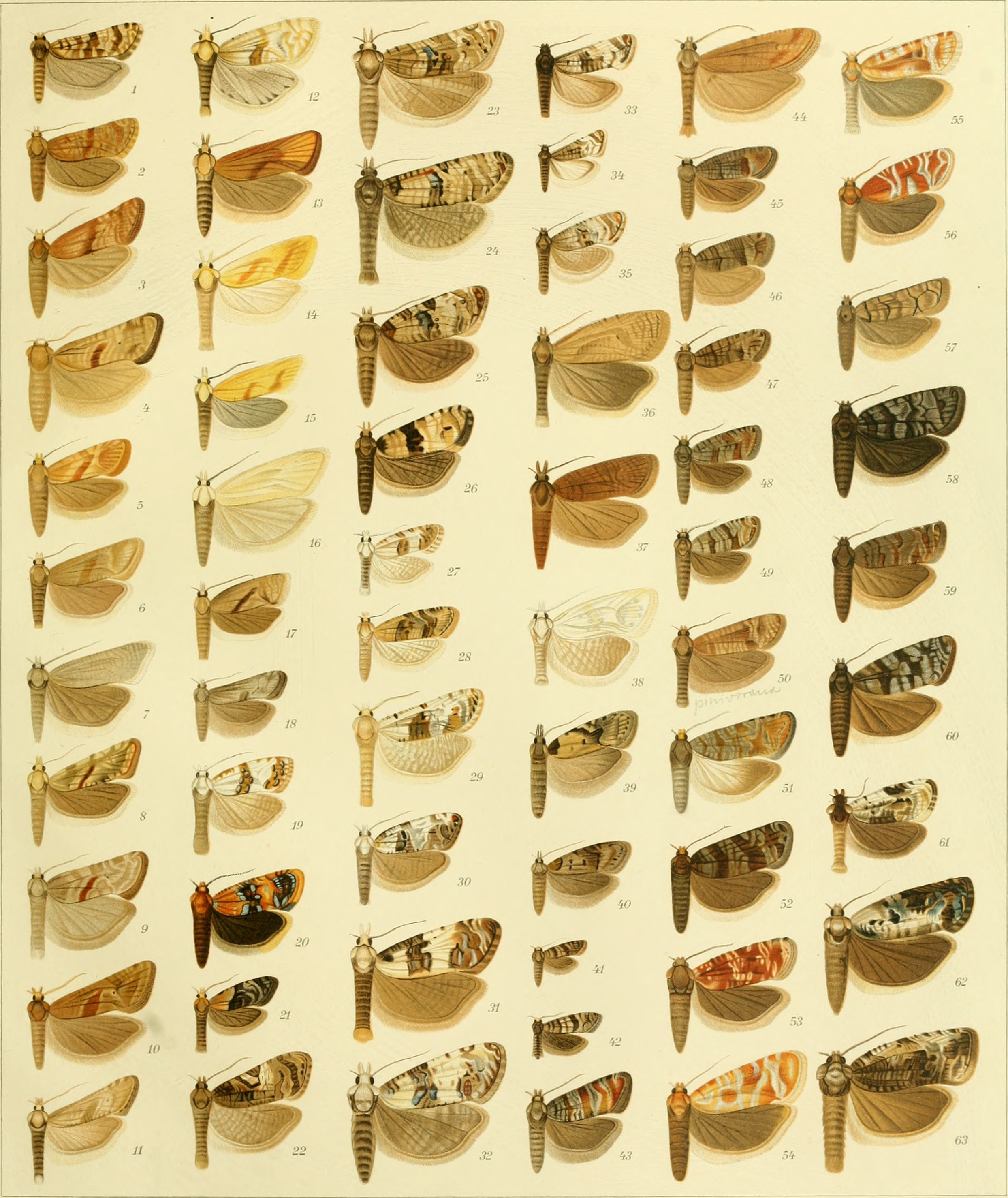
- Phtheochroa pulvillana in Kennel Die palaearktischen tortriciden figure 26 female

Scientific classification
- Domain: Eukaryota
- Kingdom: Animalia
- Phylum: Arthropoda
- Class: Insecta
- Order: Lepidoptera
- Family: Tortricidae
- Genus: Phtheochroa
- Species: P. pulvillana

Binomial name
- Phtheochroa pulvillana (Herrich-Schäffer, 1851)

Synonyms
- Tortrix (Phtheochroa) pulvillana Herrich-Schaffer, 1851; Trachysmia pulvillana; Hysterosia pulvillana; Hysterosia pulvillana dispuncta Kuznetzov, 1976

= Phtheochroa pulvillana =

Species of moth

Phtheochroa pulvillana is a species of moth of the family Tortricidae. It is found from Europe (where it has been recorded from Germany, Poland, Austria, Italy, the Czech Republic, Slovakia, Hungary, Romania, Croatia, North Macedonia and Ukraine) to south-eastern Russia, Transcaucasia and Iran.

The wingspan is 16–21 mm. Adults have been recorded on wing from May to July in one generation per year.

The larvae feed on Asparagus officinalis. They feed in the stem of their host plant. The species overwinters in the larval stage.
