= Phtheochroa hydnum =

Scientific classification
- Kingdom: Animalia
- Phylum: Arthropoda
- Class: Insecta
- Order: Lepidoptera
- Family: Tortricidae
- Genus: Phtheochroa
- Species: P. hydnum

Binomial name
- Phtheochroa hydnum Razowski, 1991

Species of moth

Phtheochroa hydnum is a species of moth of the family Tortricidae. It is found in Chihuahua, Mexico.
