= Phtheochroa issikii =

Scientific classification
- Kingdom: Animalia
- Phylum: Arthropoda
- Class: Insecta
- Order: Lepidoptera
- Family: Tortricidae
- Genus: Phtheochroa
- Species: P. issikii

Binomial name
- Phtheochroa issikii (Razowski, 1977)

Synonyms
- Hysterosia issikii Razowski, 1977

Species of moth

Phtheochroa issikii is a species of moth of the family Tortricidae. It is found in Japan.
