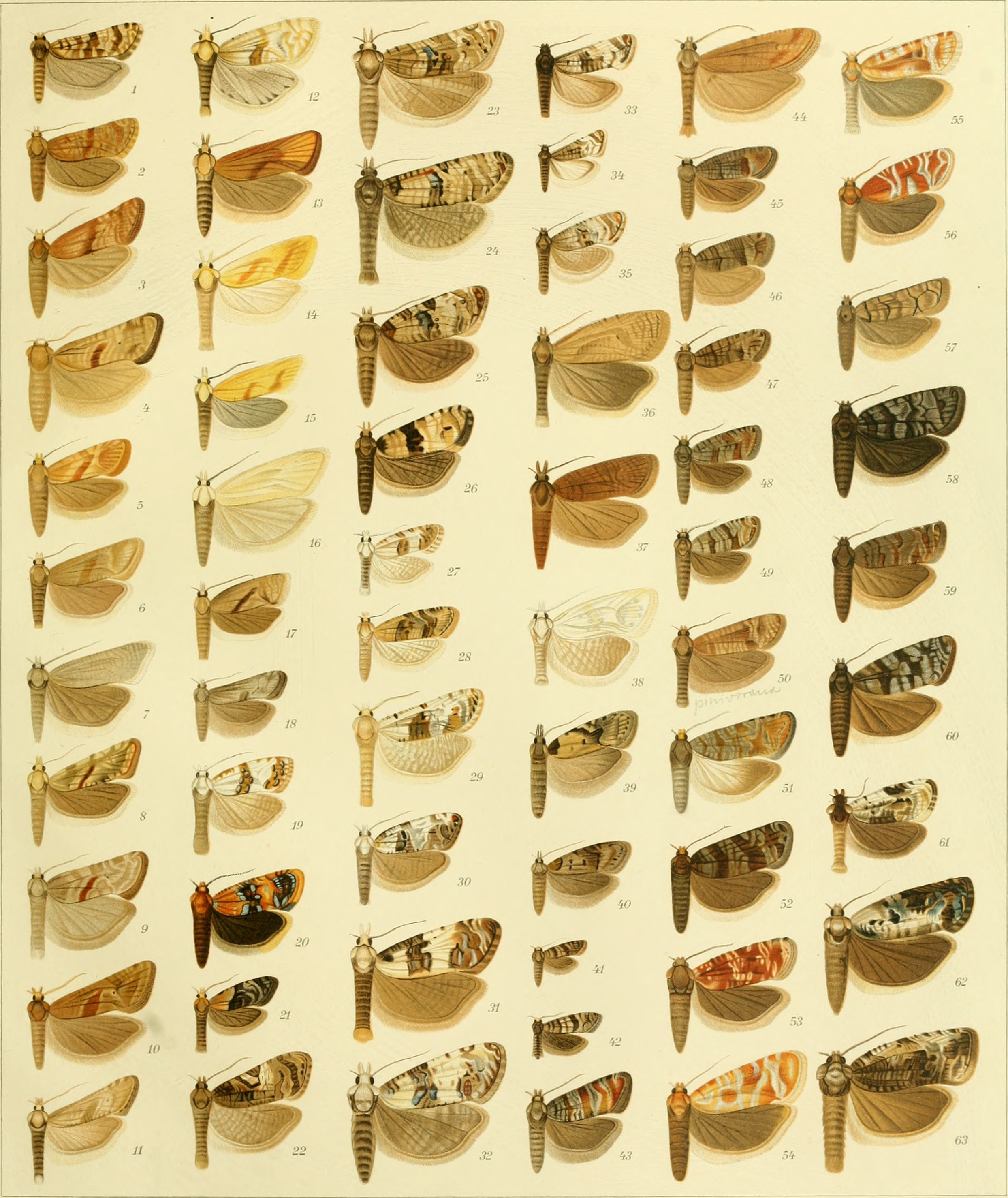
- Phtheochroa frigidana in Kennel Die palaearktischen tortriciden figure 15

Scientific classification
- Kingdom: Animalia
- Phylum: Arthropoda
- Class: Insecta
- Order: Lepidoptera
- Family: Tortricidae
- Genus: Phtheochroa
- Species: P. frigidana

Binomial name
- Phtheochroa frigidana (Guenée, 1845)

Synonyms
- Eupoecilia frigidana Guenée, 1845; Conchylis andorrana Millière, 1865; Phtheochroa flavana Razowski, 1991; Cochylis flavidana Guenée, 1846; Conchylis schawerdae Rebel, in Schawerda, 1908; Aphelia sulphurana Guenée, 1845; Aphelia sulphurosana Razowski, 1970

= Phtheochroa frigidana =

Species of moth

Phtheochroa frigidana is a species of moth of the family Tortricidae. It is found in Spain, Andorra, France, Italy, Albania and Bosnia and Herzegovina.

The wingspan is 18–24 mm. Adults have been recorded on wing from April to July.
