= Phtheochroa aegrana =

Scientific classification
- Domain: Eukaryota
- Kingdom: Animalia
- Phylum: Arthropoda
- Class: Insecta
- Order: Lepidoptera
- Family: Tortricidae
- Genus: Phtheochroa
- Species: P. aegrana

Binomial name
- Phtheochroa aegrana (Walsingham, 1879)

Synonyms
- Idiographis aegrana Walsingham, 1879

Species of moth

Phtheochroa aegrana is a species of moth of the family Tortricidae. It is found in North America, where it has been recorded from Alberta, Oregon, California and New Mexico.

The wingspan is 14–16 mm. Adults have been recorded on wing from May to August and in January.
