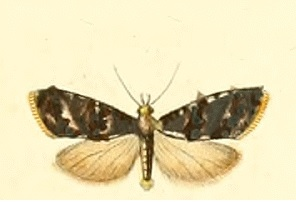

Scientific classification
- Domain: Eukaryota
- Kingdom: Animalia
- Phylum: Arthropoda
- Class: Insecta
- Order: Lepidoptera
- Family: Tortricidae
- Genus: Phtheochroa
- Species: P. duponchelana

Binomial name
- Phtheochroa duponchelana (Duponchel in Godart, 1843)

Synonyms
- Sericoris duponchelana Duponchel in Godart, 1843; Sericoris duponcheliana Costa, 1847; Tortrix gloriosana Herrich-Schaffer, 1847; Tortrix (Phtheochroa) gloriosana Herrich-Schaffer, 1851; Hysterosia syriaca Walsingham, 1900

= Phtheochroa duponchelana =

Species of moth

Phtheochroa duponchelana is a species of moth of the family Tortricidae. It is found in Portugal, southern France, Italy, Sicily, Malta, Crete, Albania, former Yugoslavia, southern Hungary, North Macedonia, Greece, Asia Minor, Lebanon, Syria, Morocco and Algeria.

The wingspan is 18–22 mm. Adults have been recorded on wing from April to May and in July.

The larvae feed on Acanthus spinosus.
