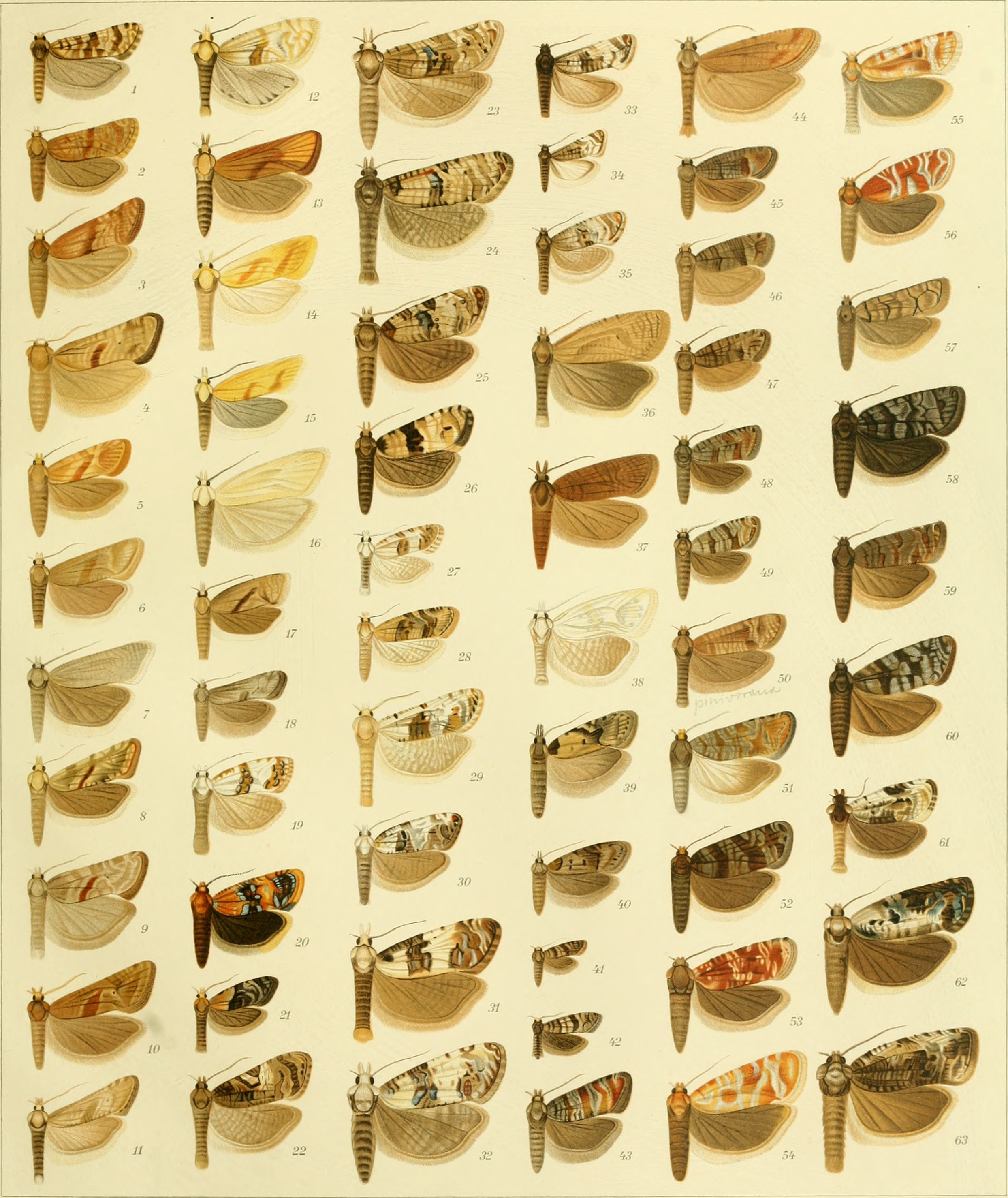
- Phtheochroa syrtana in Kennel Die palaearktischen tortriciden figure 27 male

Scientific classification
- Domain: Eukaryota
- Kingdom: Animalia
- Phylum: Arthropoda
- Class: Insecta
- Order: Lepidoptera
- Family: Tortricidae
- Genus: Phtheochroa
- Species: P. syrtana

Binomial name
- Phtheochroa syrtana Ragonot, 1888

= Phtheochroa syrtana =

Species of moth

Phtheochroa syrtana is a species of moth of the family Tortricidae. It is found in north-western Africa (Tunisia and Algeria), Spain and Iran.

The wingspan is 14–16 mm. Adults have been recorded on wing from October to November.
