= Phtheochroa meraca =

Scientific classification
- Kingdom: Animalia
- Phylum: Arthropoda
- Class: Insecta
- Order: Lepidoptera
- Family: Tortricidae
- Genus: Phtheochroa
- Species: P. meraca

Binomial name
- Phtheochroa meraca (Razowski, 1984)

Synonyms
- Trachysmia meraca Razowski, 1984

Species of moth

Phtheochroa meraca is a species of moth of the family Tortricidae. It is found in Puebla, Mexico.
