= Phtheochroa palpana =

Scientific classification
- Domain: Eukaryota
- Kingdom: Animalia
- Phylum: Arthropoda
- Class: Insecta
- Order: Lepidoptera
- Family: Tortricidae
- Genus: Phtheochroa
- Species: P. palpana

Binomial name
- Phtheochroa palpana (Ragonot, 1894)

Synonyms
- Conchylis palpana Ragonot, 1894; Trachysmia palpana

Species of moth

Phtheochroa palpana is a species of moth of the family Tortricidae. It is found in Asia Minor, northern Syria and Mesopotamia.
