= Phtheochroa sinecarina =

Scientific classification
- Kingdom: Animalia
- Phylum: Arthropoda
- Clade: Pancrustacea
- Class: Insecta
- Order: Lepidoptera
- Family: Tortricidae
- Genus: Phtheochroa
- Species: P. sinecarina

Binomial name
- Phtheochroa sinecarina Huemer, 1989

Species of moth

Phtheochroa sinecarina is a species of moth of the family Tortricidae. It is found in Morocco.
