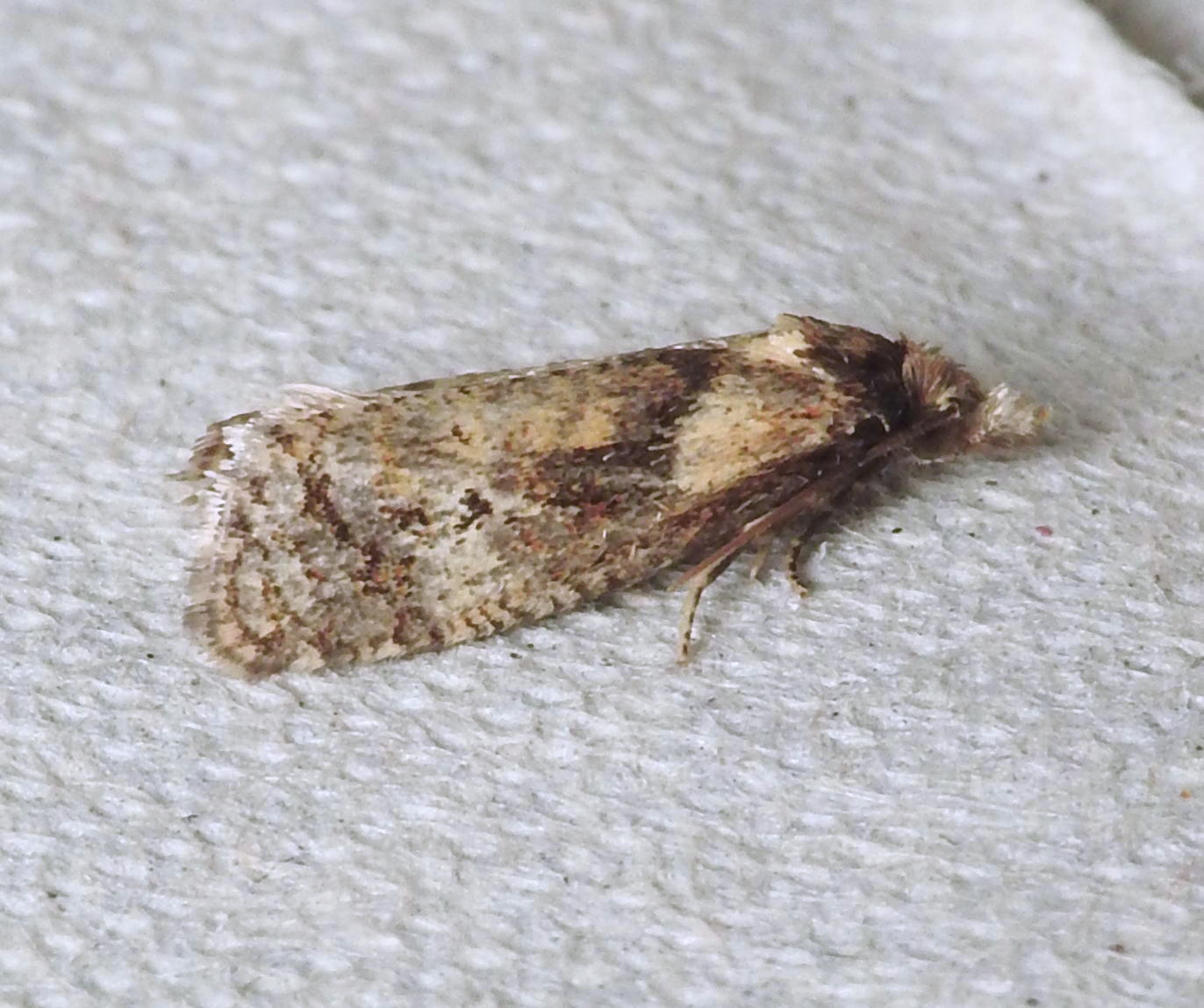

Scientific classification
- Kingdom: Animalia
- Phylum: Arthropoda
- Clade: Pancrustacea
- Class: Insecta
- Order: Lepidoptera
- Family: Tortricidae
- Genus: Phtheochroa
- Species: P. villana

Binomial name
- Phtheochroa villana (Busck, 1907)

Synonyms
- Hysterosia villana Busck, 1907

= Phtheochroa villana =

Species of moth

Phtheochroa villana is a species of moth of the family Tortricidae. It is found in North America, where it has been recorded from Colorado, Alberta, Indiana, Maine, New Mexico, North Dakota and Ohio.

The wingspan is 19–21 mm. Adults have been recorded on wing from June to August.
