= Phtheochroa kenyana =

Scientific classification
- Domain: Eukaryota
- Kingdom: Animalia
- Phylum: Arthropoda
- Class: Insecta
- Order: Lepidoptera
- Family: Tortricidae
- Genus: Phtheochroa
- Species: P. kenyana

Binomial name
- Phtheochroa kenyana Aarvik, 2010

Species of moth

Phtheochroa kenyana is a species of moth of the family Tortricidae. It is found in Kenya.

The wingspan is about 15 mm for males and 20 mm for females.

== Etymology ==
The species is named for Kenya, the country where the species was collected.
