= Phtheochroa albiceps =

Scientific classification
- Domain: Eukaryota
- Kingdom: Animalia
- Phylum: Arthropoda
- Class: Insecta
- Order: Lepidoptera
- Family: Tortricidae
- Genus: Phtheochroa
- Species: P. albiceps

Binomial name
- Phtheochroa albiceps (Walsingham, 1914)

Synonyms
- Propira albiceps Walsingham, 1914

Species of moth

Phtheochroa albiceps is a species of moth of the family Tortricidae. It is found in Guerrero, Mexico.
