= Phtheochroa annae =

Scientific classification
- Kingdom: Animalia
- Phylum: Arthropoda
- Clade: Pancrustacea
- Class: Insecta
- Order: Lepidoptera
- Family: Tortricidae
- Genus: Phtheochroa
- Species: P. annae

Binomial name
- Phtheochroa annae Huemer, 1989

Species of moth

Phtheochroa annae is a species of moth of the family Tortricidae. It is found in Austria, the Czech Republic, Slovakia, Hungary, Romania, and Greece, typically inhabiting dry, open habitats where its host plant, Bryonia dioica, thrives.

The wingspan is about 21–23 mm. Adults have been recorded on wing from April to May.

The larvae feed on Bryonia dioica.
