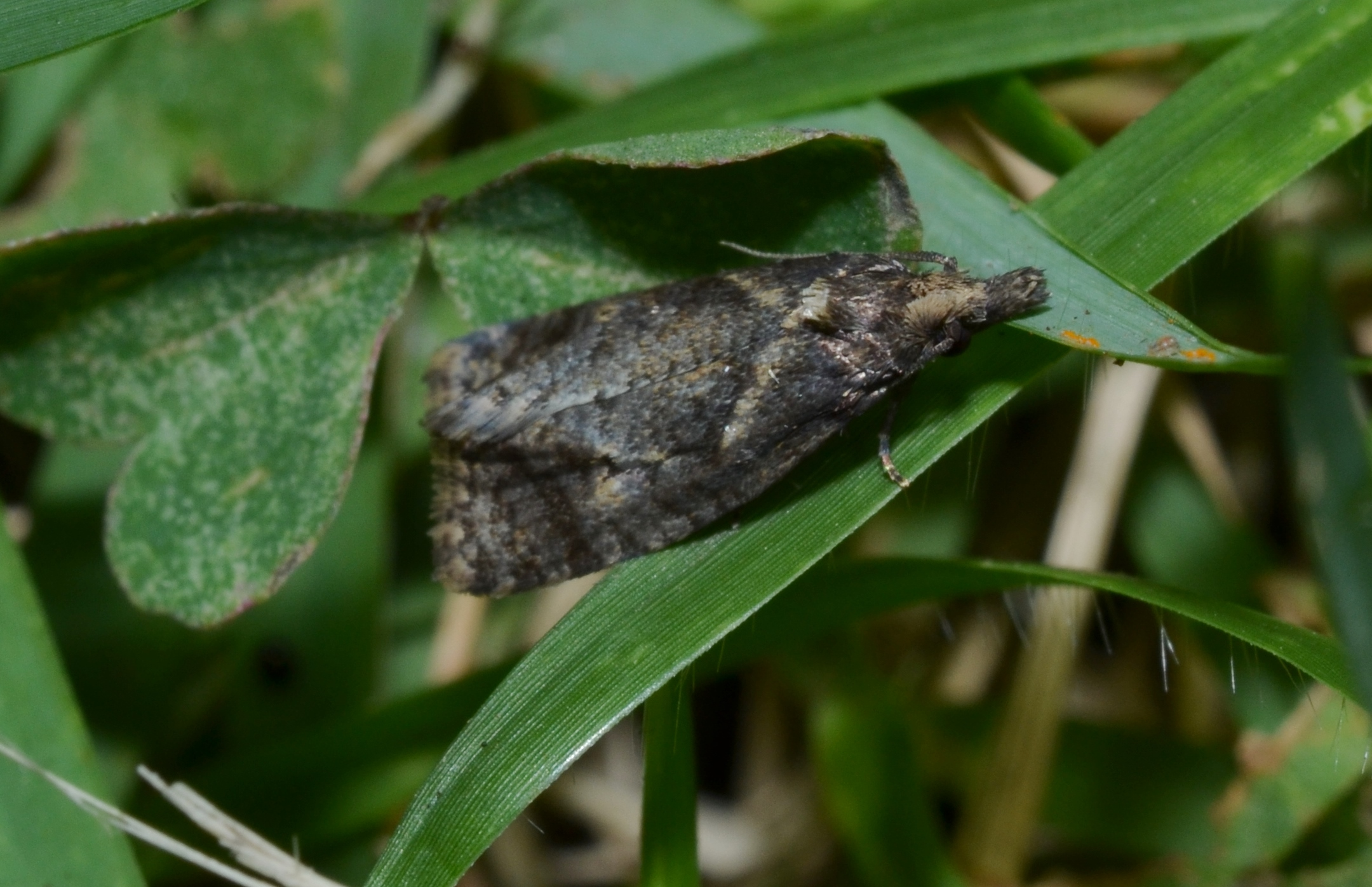

Scientific classification
- Domain: Eukaryota
- Kingdom: Animalia
- Phylum: Arthropoda
- Class: Insecta
- Order: Lepidoptera
- Family: Tortricidae
- Genus: Phtheochroa
- Species: P. riscana

Binomial name
- Phtheochroa riscana (Kearfott, 1907)

Synonyms
- Hysterosia riscana Kearfott, 1907; Hysterosia vincta Meyrick, 1912

= Phtheochroa riscana =

Species of moth

Phtheochroa riscana is a species of moth of the family Tortricidae. It is found in North America, where it has been recorded from Indiana, Kentucky, Maine, Manitoba, Maryland, Massachusetts, Minnesota, New Brunswick, New Jersey, Newfoundland, North Carolina, Ohio, Oklahoma, Ontario, Pennsylvania, Quebec, Tennessee and Vermont.

The wingspan is 15–16 mm. Adults have been recorded on wing from June to August.
