= Phtheochroa gigantica =

Scientific classification
- Domain: Eukaryota
- Kingdom: Animalia
- Phylum: Arthropoda
- Class: Insecta
- Order: Lepidoptera
- Family: Tortricidae
- Genus: Phtheochroa
- Species: P. gigantica

Binomial name
- Phtheochroa gigantica (Busck, 1920)

Synonyms
- Hysterosia gigantica Busck, 1920

Species of moth

Phtheochroa gigantica is a species of moth of the family Tortricidae. It is found in the Federal District of Mexico.
