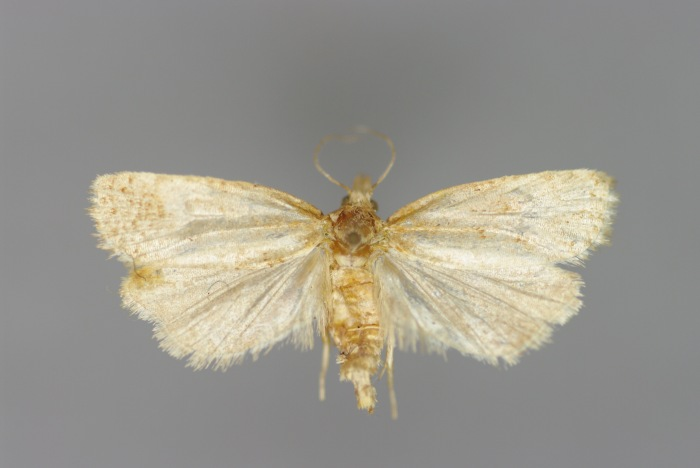

Scientific classification
- Kingdom: Animalia
- Phylum: Arthropoda
- Clade: Pancrustacea
- Class: Insecta
- Order: Lepidoptera
- Family: Tortricidae
- Genus: Phtheochroa
- Species: P. inopiana

Binomial name
- Phtheochroa inopiana (Haworth, [1811])

Synonyms
- Tortrix inopiana Haworth, [1811]; Tortrix centrana Herrich-Schaffer, 1850; Tortrix (Euchromia) centrana Herrich-Schaffer, 1851; Tortrix (Idiographis) excentricana Erschoff, 1877; Hysterosia inopiana ab. hinnuleana Krulikowsky, 1908; Hysterosia inopiana var. obscurana Kennel, 1913; Hysterosia inopiana var. pallidana Caradja, 1916; Tortrix tripsiana Eversmann, 1844

= Phtheochroa inopiana =

Species of moth

Phtheochroa inopiana, the plain conch, is a species of moth of the family Tortricidae.

== Description ==
The wingspan is 17–22 mm. The forewings are relatively narrow and brownish, and are quite variable in colour. Adults are sexually dimorphic; the females are plainer than the males. Meyrick describes it: "Forewings light ochreous, more or less sprinkled or strigulated with brownish, sometimes reddish-tinged; sometimes two darker dots in disc beyond middle. Hindwings pale fuscous. The larva ochreous-whitish; head and plate of 2 brown."

== Biology ==
The adult flight period of the plain conch is from June to August in western Europe.

The larvae feed inside the roots of Pulicaria dysenterica. The species overwinters in the larval stage.

== Distribution ==
It is found in China (Beijing, Gansu, Hebei, Heilongjiang, Jilin), Iran, Japan, Mongolia, Russia and most of Europe. It has also been recorded in North America.

== Habitat ==
The habitat consists of damp areas and woodland edges.
