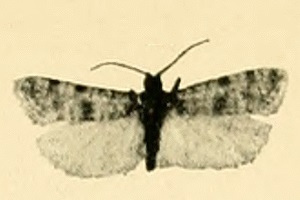

Scientific classification
- Domain: Eukaryota
- Kingdom: Animalia
- Phylum: Arthropoda
- Class: Insecta
- Order: Lepidoptera
- Family: Tortricidae
- Genus: Phtheochroa
- Species: P. gracillimana

Binomial name
- Phtheochroa gracillimana (Rebel, 1910)

Synonyms
- Conchylis gracillimana Rebel, 1910; Phtheochroa gracilimana Razowski, 1991

= Phtheochroa gracillimana =

Species of moth

Phtheochroa gracillimana is a species of moth of the family Tortricidae. It is found in Spain.

The wingspan is 6–9 mm. Adults have been recorded on wing in June.
