= Phtheochroa sociana =

Scientific classification
- Domain: Eukaryota
- Kingdom: Animalia
- Phylum: Arthropoda
- Class: Insecta
- Order: Lepidoptera
- Family: Tortricidae
- Genus: Phtheochroa
- Species: P. sociana

Binomial name
- Phtheochroa sociana (Esartiya, 1988)

Synonyms
- Trachysmia sociana Esartiya, 1988; Trachysmia karadaghina Budashkin, 1992

Species of moth

Phtheochroa sociana is a species of moth of the family Tortricidae. It is found on the Crimea and in Georgia and the Near East.

The wingspan is 11–14 mm. Adults have been recorded on wing from May to June.
