= Phtheochroa exasperantana =

Scientific classification
- Domain: Eukaryota
- Kingdom: Animalia
- Phylum: Arthropoda
- Class: Insecta
- Order: Lepidoptera
- Family: Tortricidae
- Genus: Phtheochroa
- Species: P. exasperantana

Binomial name
- Phtheochroa exasperantana (Christoph, 1872)

Synonyms
- Conchylis exasperantana Christoph, 1872; Hysterosia cornigera Razowski, 1970; Conchylis exasperatana Caradja, 1916

Species of moth

Phtheochroa exasperantana is a species of moth of the family Tortricidae. It is found in Tajikistan and Russia.

The wingspan is about 16 mm. Adults have been recorded on wing in August.
