= Phtheochroa subfumida =

Scientific classification
- Domain: Eukaryota
- Kingdom: Animalia
- Phylum: Arthropoda
- Class: Insecta
- Order: Lepidoptera
- Family: Tortricidae
- Genus: Phtheochroa
- Species: P. subfumida

Binomial name
- Phtheochroa subfumida (Falkovitsh, 1963)

Synonyms
- Hysterosia (Propira) subfumida Falkovitsh, 1963

Species of moth

Phtheochroa subfumida is a species of moth of the family Tortricidae. The species was described by Mark I. Falkovitsh in 1963. It is found in Central Asia, Armenia, the south-eastern part of European Russia and Iran.

The wingspan is about 15 mm. Adults have been recorded on wing in May and August.

The larvae feed on Haloxylon ammodendron and Salsola arbuscula.
