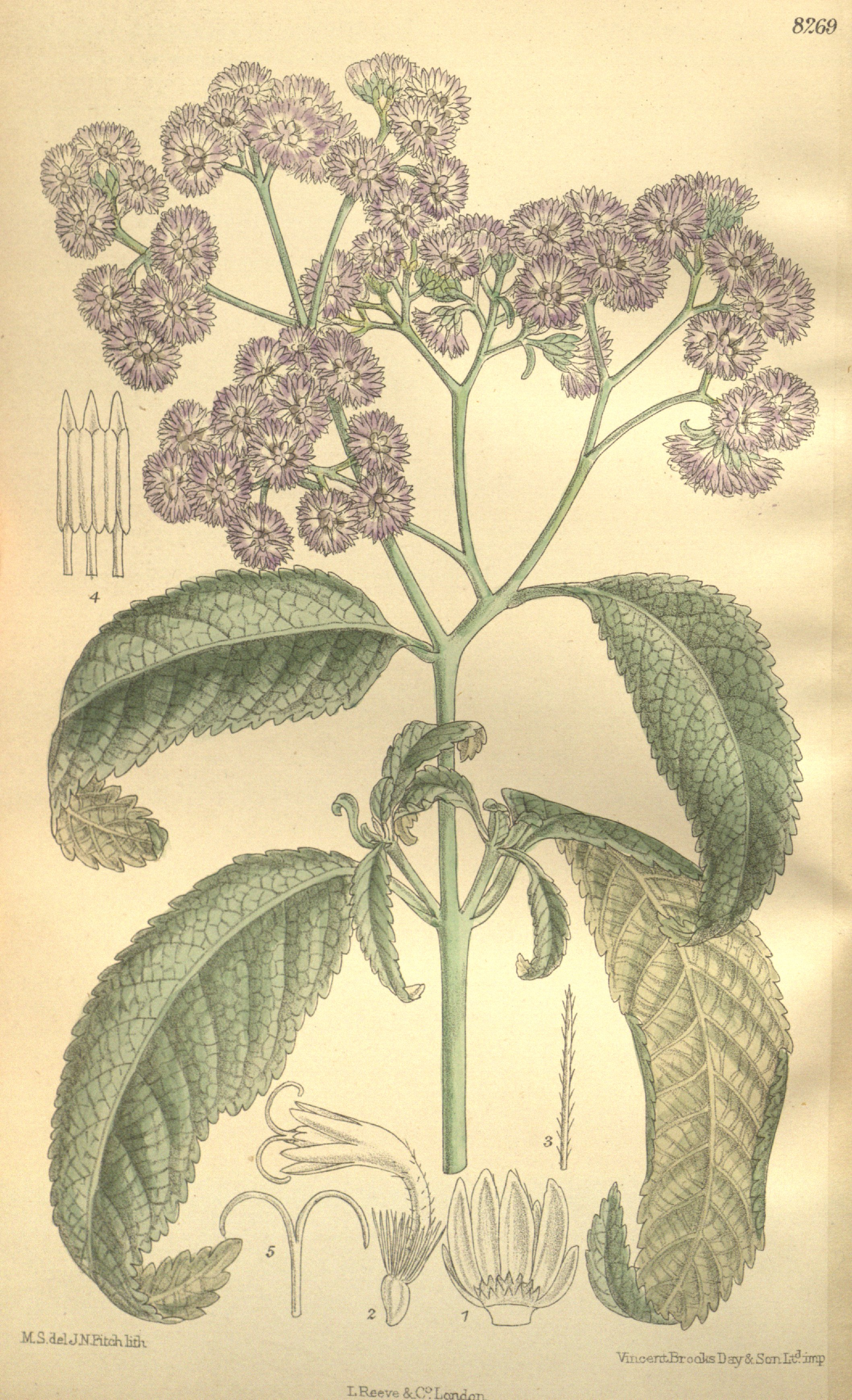

Scientific classification
- Kingdom: Plantae
- Clade: Tracheophytes
- Clade: Angiosperms
- Clade: Eudicots
- Clade: Asterids
- Order: Asterales
- Family: Asteraceae
- Genus: Bothriocline
- Species: B. longipes

Binomial name
- Bothriocline longipes (Oliv. & Hiern) N.E.Br.

Synonyms
- Bothriocline schimperi var. longipes Oliv. & Hiern; Erlangea longipes (Oliv. & Hiern) S.Moore; Bothriocline eupatorioides (Hutch. & B.L.Burtt) Wild & G.V.Pope; Bothriocline schimperi var. tomentosa Oliv. & Hiern; Bothriocline tomentosa (Oliv. & Hiern) Wild & G.V.Pope; Erlangea eupatorioides Hutch. & B.L.Burtt; Erlangea pubescens S.Moore; Erlangea spissa S.Moore; Erlangea squarrosula Chiov.; Erlangea tomentosa (Oliv. & Hiern) S.Moore; Erlangea tomentosa var. acuta R.E.Fr.

= Bothriocline longipes =

Perennial herb or shrub

Bothriocline longipes is a woody perennial herb or shrub in the family Asteraceae. It is capable of reaching three meters tall.

== Description ==
Woody herb or shrub, leaves, opposite, petiole is up to 2.5 cm long; leaf-blade is narrowly ovate with an acute apex and a base that is cuneate to rounded. Flowers, corolla is lilac, mauve or bright purple colored

== Chemistry ==
Compounds isolated from the flowers of the species shows the presence of anthocyanidins. Oil extracted from the seed of Bothriocline longipes was identified to contain non epoxy tri-glycerides and epoxy acids.

== Uses ==
Extracts of the species are used as ingredients of a regimen of herbal remedies to treat a variety of pain or inflammatory related issues. Leaf extracts are used in managing colic pains, diarrhea, syphilis and conjunctivitis. Parts of root is chewed to ameliorate sore throat.
