= Phtheochroa cistobursa =

Scientific classification
- Kingdom: Animalia
- Phylum: Arthropoda
- Class: Insecta
- Order: Lepidoptera
- Family: Tortricidae
- Genus: Phtheochroa
- Species: P. cistobursa

Binomial name
- Phtheochroa cistobursa Razowski, 1991

Species of moth

Phtheochroa cistobursa is a species of moth of the family Tortricidae. It is found in Jalisco, Mexico.
