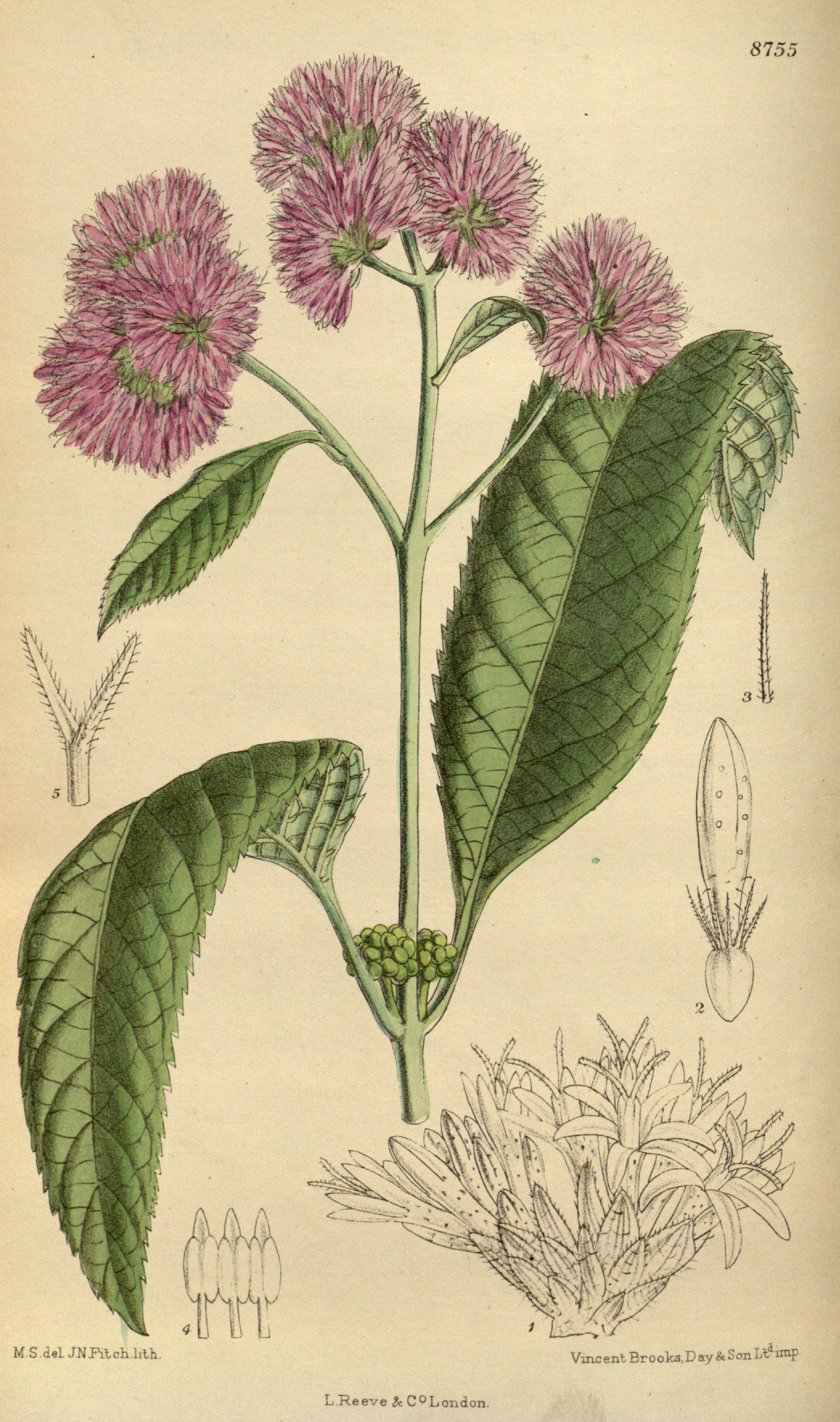
- Bothriocline aggregata

Scientific classification
- Kingdom: Plantae
- Clade: Embryophytes
- Clade: Tracheophytes
- Clade: Angiosperms
- Clade: Eudicots
- Clade: Asterids
- Order: Asterales
- Family: Asteraceae
- Subfamily: Vernonioideae
- Tribe: Vernonieae
- Genus: Bothriocline; Oliv. ex Benth.

Type species
- Bothriocline schimperi Oliv. & Hiern ex Benth.

Synonyms
- Volkensia O.Hoffm.

= Bothriocline =

Genus of flowering plants

Bothriocline is a genus of flowering plants in the family Asteraceae. They are native to tropical Africa and some islands of the Indian Ocean. They are hairy annual and perennial herbs with purple or mauve flowers.

Species

- Bothriocline aggregata
- Bothriocline amphicoma
- Bothriocline amplifolia
- Bothriocline angolensis
- Bothriocline argentea
- Bothriocline atroviolacea
- Bothriocline attenuata
- Bothriocline auriculata
- Bothriocline bagshawei
- Bothriocline bampsii
- Bothriocline carrissoi
- Bothriocline concinna
- Bothriocline congesta
- Bothriocline cuneifolia
- Bothriocline emilioides
- Bothriocline ethulioides
- Bothriocline fusca
- Bothriocline glabrescens
- Bothriocline globosa
- Bothriocline glomerata
- Bothriocline grandicapitulata
- Bothriocline grindeliifolia
- Bothriocline hispida
- Bothriocline hoyoensis
- Bothriocline huillensis
- Bothriocline imatongensis
- Bothriocline inyangana
- Bothriocline ituriensis
- Bothriocline katangensis
- Bothriocline kundelungensis
- Bothriocline kungwensis
- Bothriocline laxa
- Bothriocline leonardiana
- Bothriocline longipes
- Bothriocline madagascariensis
- Bothriocline malaissei
- Bothriocline marungensis
- Bothriocline mbalensis
- Bothriocline microcephala
- Bothriocline milanjiensis
- Bothriocline monocephala
- Bothriocline monticola
- Bothriocline moramballae
- Bothriocline muschlerana
- Bothriocline nyiruensis
- Bothriocline nyungwensis
- Bothriocline pauciseta
- Bothriocline pauwelsii
- Bothriocline pectinata
- Bothriocline quercifolia
- Bothriocline ripensis
- Bothriocline ruwenzoriensis
- Bothriocline schimperi
- Bothriocline sengensis
- Bothriocline shagayuensis
- Bothriocline steetziana
- Bothriocline subcordata
- Bothriocline trifoliata
- Bothriocline ugandensis
- Bothriocline upembensis
- Bothriocline virungae
- Bothriocline wittei
