= Phtheochroa fulviplicana =

Scientific classification
- Domain: Eukaryota
- Kingdom: Animalia
- Phylum: Arthropoda
- Class: Insecta
- Order: Lepidoptera
- Family: Tortricidae
- Genus: Phtheochroa
- Species: P. fulviplicana

Binomial name
- Phtheochroa fulviplicana (Walsingham, 1879)

Synonyms
- Idiographis fulviplicana Walsingham, 1879; Hysterosia fermentata Meyrick, 1912; Hysterosia homanana Kearfott, 1907; Hysterosia komonana Kearfott, 1907; Hysterosia refuga Meyrick, 1912

Species of moth

Phtheochroa fulviplicana is a species of moth of the family Tortricidae. It is found in North America, where it has been recorded from Maine, Alberta, Nevada and California.

The wingspan is 14–23 mm. Adults have been recorded on wing from May to July and in December.
