= List of crambid genera: F =

The large moth family Crambidae contains the following genera beginning with "F":

- Falcimorpha
- Falx
- Fernandocrambus
- Filodes
- Fissicrambus
- Flavocrambus
- Framinghamia
- Frechinia
- Fredia
- Friedlanderia
- Fumibotys
- Furcivena
