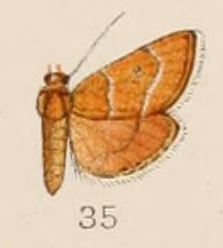

Scientific classification
- Kingdom: Animalia
- Phylum: Arthropoda
- Clade: Pancrustacea
- Class: Insecta
- Order: Lepidoptera
- Family: Crambidae
- Subfamily: Cybalomiinae
- Genus: Cybalomia; Lederer, 1863

Synonyms
- Cybolomia Romanoff, 1887; Capparidia Dumont, 1931

= Cybalomia =

Genus of moths

Cymbalomia is a genus of moths of the family Crambidae.

== Species ==
- Cybalomia albilinealis (Hampson, 1896)
- Cybalomia arenosalis Rebel, 1912
- Cybalomia azzalana Rothschild, 1921
- Cybalomia cervinalis Hampson, 1908
- Cybalomia fractilinealis (Erschoff, 1874)
- Cybalomia gratiosalis Christoph in Romanoff, 1887
- Cybalomia gyoti Rebel, 1909
- Cybalomia lactealis (Rothschild, 1915)
- Cybalomia ledereri Rothschild, 1921
- Cybalomia lutosalis Mann, 1862
- Cybalomia pentadalis (Lederer, 1855)
- Cybalomia simplex Warren & Rothschild, 1905

== Former species ==
- Cybalomia simplicealis (Rothschild, 1915)
