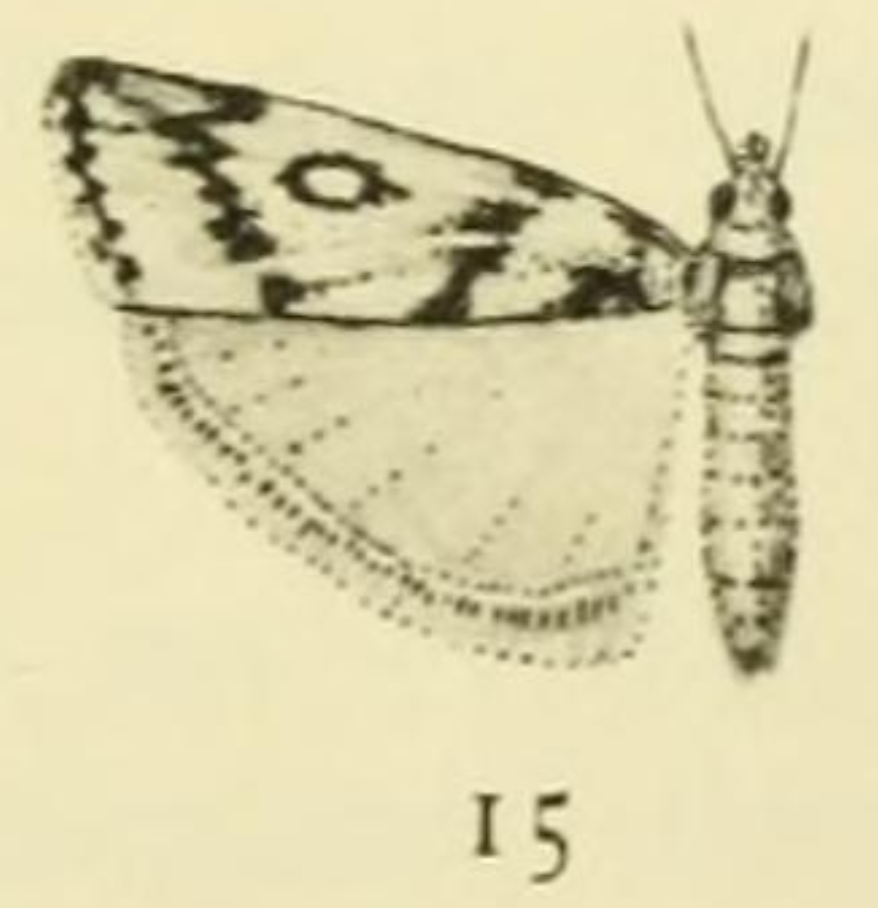

Scientific classification
- Kingdom: Animalia
- Phylum: Arthropoda
- Class: Insecta
- Order: Lepidoptera
- Family: Crambidae
- Genus: Fernandocrambus
- Species: F. annulata

Binomial name
- Fernandocrambus annulata (Aurivillius, 1922) Bleszynski, 1967

Synonyms
- Crambus annulata Aurivillius, 1922

= Fernandocrambus annulata =

Species of moth

Fernandocrambus annulata is a moth in the family Crambidae. It was described by Per Olof Christopher Aurivillius in 1922 and is found in Chile.
