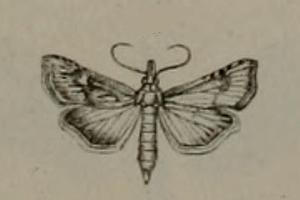

Scientific classification
- Domain: Eukaryota
- Kingdom: Animalia
- Phylum: Arthropoda
- Class: Insecta
- Order: Lepidoptera
- Family: Crambidae
- Genus: Cybalomia
- Species: C. pentadalis

Binomial name
- Cybalomia pentadalis (Lederer, 1855)

Synonyms
- Botys pentadalis Lederer, 1855

= Cybalomia pentadalis =

Species of moth

Cybalomia pentadalis is a species of moth in the family Crambidae. It is found in Greece, Turkey, Lebanon and Sudan.
