= Fernandocrambus harpipterus =

Scientific classification
- Kingdom: Animalia
- Phylum: Arthropoda
- Clade: Pancrustacea
- Class: Insecta
- Order: Lepidoptera
- Family: Crambidae
- Genus: Fernandocrambus
- Species: F. harpipterus

Binomial name
- Fernandocrambus harpipterus (Dyar, 1916)

Synonyms
- Crambus harpipterus Dyar, 1916

Species of moth

Fernandocrambus harpipterus is a moth in the family Crambidae. It is found in Mexico.

It was described by the American entomologist Harrison Gray Dyar Jr. as Crambus harpipterus in 1916 based on specimens collected from the Hidalogo and Pueblo states of Mexico. The species name means "harp-like wing" in Greek. The holotype specimen is held at the Smithsonian National Museum of Natural History in Washington, D.C.

The larvae of F. harpipterus are one of several species referred to as sod webworms. The pupa emerge as moths and mate at night. The adult moths rest with their heads facing upwards.
