= Goniophysetis =

Scientific classification
- Domain: Eukaryota
- Kingdom: Animalia
- Phylum: Arthropoda
- Class: Insecta
- Order: Lepidoptera
- Family: Crambidae
- Subfamily: Cybalomiinae
- Genus: Goniophysetis; Hampson, 1916

Synonyms
- Leucinocrambus Viette, 1960

Genus of moths

Goniophysetis is a genus of moths of the family Crambidae.

== Species ==
- Goniophysetis actalellus (Viette, 1960)
- Goniophysetis lactealis Hampson, 1916
- Goniophysetis malgassellus (Viette, 1960)
