= Phenacodes =

Scientific classification
- Domain: Eukaryota
- Kingdom: Animalia
- Phylum: Arthropoda
- Class: Insecta
- Order: Lepidoptera
- Family: Crambidae
- Subfamily: Cybalomiinae
- Genus: Phenacodes; Turner, 1937

Genus of moths

Phenacodes is a genus of moths of the family Crambidae.

== Species ==
- Phenacodes aleuropa (Lower, 1903)
- Phenacodes epipaschiodes (Hampson, 1912)
- Phenacodes nigroalba (Rothschild, 1915)
- Phenacodes nolalis (Hampson, 1899)
- Phenacodes scopariodes (Hampson, 1912)
- Phenacodes vegetata (T. P. Lucas, 1901)
