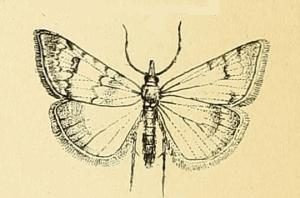

Scientific classification
- Domain: Eukaryota
- Kingdom: Animalia
- Phylum: Arthropoda
- Class: Insecta
- Order: Lepidoptera
- Family: Crambidae
- Genus: Cybalomia
- Species: C. lutosalis

Binomial name
- Cybalomia lutosalis (Mann, 1862)

Synonyms
- Botys lutosalis Mann, 1862

= Cybalomia lutosalis =

Species of moth

Cybalomia lutosalis is a species of moth in the family Crambidae. It is found in Italy (including Sardinia), Croatia, and Turkey.
