= Phenacodes vegetata =

Scientific classification
- Kingdom: Animalia
- Phylum: Arthropoda
- Clade: Pancrustacea
- Class: Insecta
- Order: Lepidoptera
- Family: Crambidae
- Genus: Phenacodes
- Species: P. vegetata

Binomial name
- Phenacodes vegetata (T. P. Lucas, 1901)

Synonyms
- Bryophila vegetata T. P. Lucas, 1901

Species of moth

Phenacodes vegetata is a moth in the family Crambidae. It is found in Australia, where it has been recorded from Queensland.
