= Cybalomia gratiosalis =

Scientific classification
- Kingdom: Animalia
- Phylum: Arthropoda
- Clade: Pancrustacea
- Class: Insecta
- Order: Lepidoptera
- Family: Crambidae
- Genus: Cybalomia
- Species: C. gratiosalis

Binomial name
- Cybalomia gratiosalis Christoph in Romanoff, 1887

Species of moth

Cybalomia gratiosalis is a moth in the family Crambidae, which was described by Hugo Theodor Christoph in 1887 and is found in Transcaucasia.
