= Erpis =

Scientific classification
- Kingdom: Animalia
- Phylum: Arthropoda
- Class: Insecta
- Order: Lepidoptera
- Family: Crambidae
- Subfamily: Cybalomiinae
- Genus: Erpis; Walker, 1863
- Species: E. macularis

Binomial name
- Erpis macularis Walker, 1863

Genus of moths

Erpis is a genus of moths of the family Crambidae. It was described by Francis Walker in 1863. It contains only one species, Erpis macularis, which is found on Borneo.

The forewings are whitish with a blackish discal spot and four blackish bands.
