= Fernandocrambus stilatus =

Scientific classification
- Kingdom: Animalia
- Phylum: Arthropoda
- Clade: Pancrustacea
- Class: Insecta
- Order: Lepidoptera
- Family: Crambidae
- Genus: Fernandocrambus
- Species: F. stilatus

Binomial name
- Fernandocrambus stilatus (Zeller, 1877)

Synonyms
- Crambus stilatus Zeller, 1877

Species of moth

Fernandocrambus stilatus is a moth in the family Crambidae. It was described by Zeller in 1877. It is found in Argentina.
