= Fernandocrambus radicellus =

Scientific classification
- Kingdom: Animalia
- Phylum: Arthropoda
- Class: Insecta
- Order: Lepidoptera
- Family: Crambidae
- Genus: Fernandocrambus
- Species: F. radicellus

Binomial name
- Fernandocrambus radicellus (Hampson, 1896)

Synonyms
- Crambus radicellus Hampson, 1896

Species of moth

Fernandocrambus radicellus is a moth in the family Crambidae. It was described by George Hampson in 1896. It is found in Patagonia.
