= Thyridiphora =

Scientific classification
- Domain: Eukaryota
- Kingdom: Animalia
- Phylum: Arthropoda
- Class: Insecta
- Order: Lepidoptera
- Family: Crambidae
- Subfamily: Cybalomiinae
- Genus: Thyridiphora; Warren, 1888

Synonyms
- Thyridophora Hampson, 1896

Genus of moths

Thyridiphora is a genus of moths of the family Crambidae.

== Species ==
- Thyridiphora furia Swinhoe, 1884
- Thyridiphora gilva (Turner, 1926)
