= Flavocrambus striatellus =

Scientific classification
- Kingdom: Animalia
- Phylum: Arthropoda
- Clade: Pancrustacea
- Class: Insecta
- Order: Lepidoptera
- Family: Crambidae
- Subfamily: Crambinae
- Tribe: Crambini
- Genus: Flavocrambus
- Species: F. striatellus

Binomial name
- Flavocrambus striatellus (Leech, 1889)

Synonyms
- Crambus striatellus Leech, 1889

Species of moth

Flavocrambus striatellus is a moth in the family Crambidae. It was described by John Henry Leech in 1889. It is found in Japan (Honshu) and Korea.
