= Prochoristis rupicapralis =

Scientific classification
- Kingdom: Animalia
- Phylum: Arthropoda
- Clade: Pancrustacea
- Class: Insecta
- Order: Lepidoptera
- Family: Crambidae
- Genus: Prochoristis
- Species: P. rupicapralis

Binomial name
- Prochoristis rupicapralis Lederer, 1855

Species of moth

Prochoristis rupicapralis is a moth in the family Crambidae. It is found in Lebanon, Syria, Turkmenistan and the United Arab Emirates.
