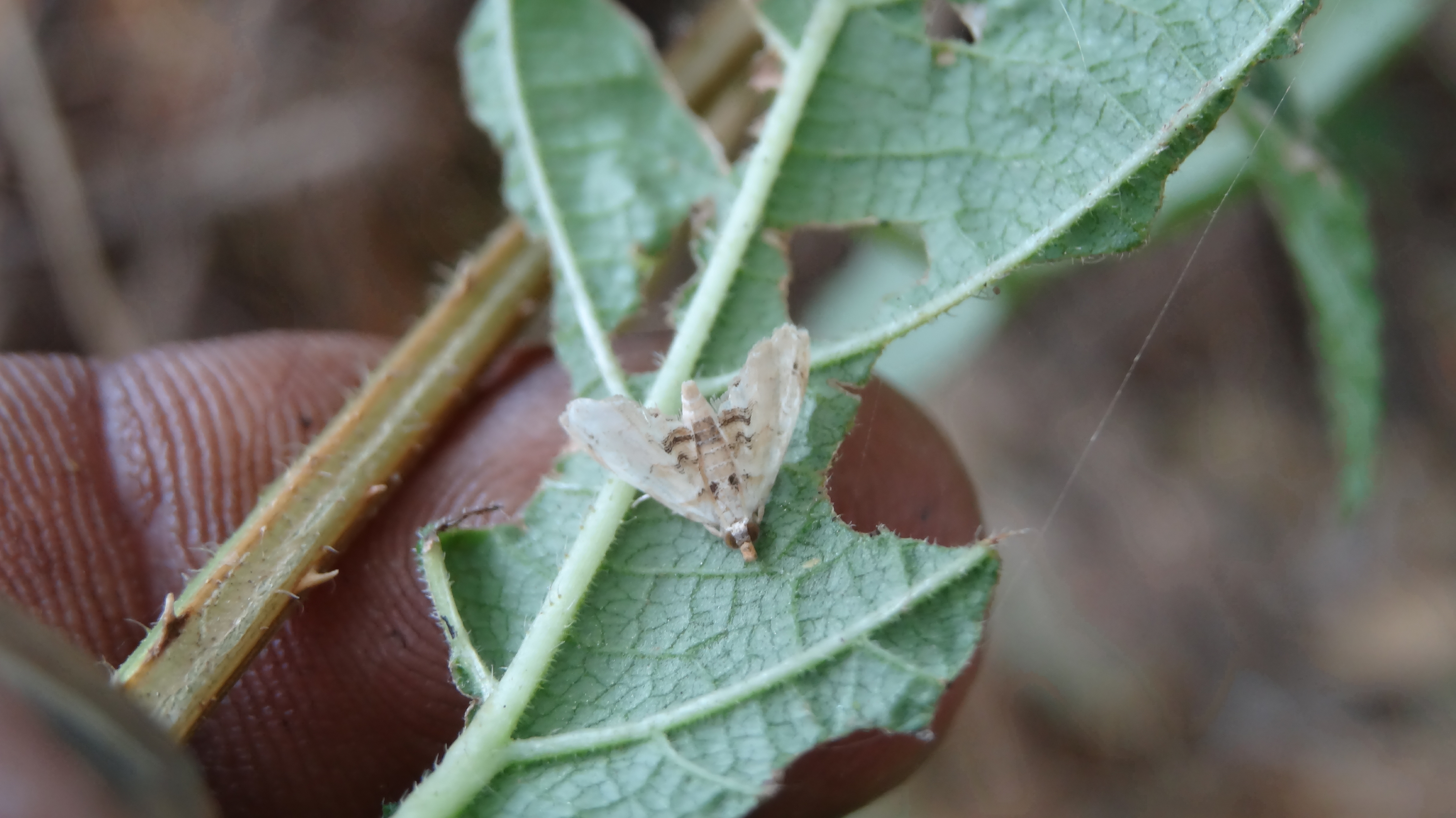

Scientific classification
- Kingdom: Animalia
- Phylum: Arthropoda
- Class: Insecta
- Order: Lepidoptera
- Family: Crambidae
- Genus: Hendecasis
- Species: H. duplifascialis

Binomial name
- Hendecasis duplifascialis (Hampson, 1891)

Synonyms
- Trichophysetis duplifascialis Hampson, 1891

= Hendecasis duplifascialis =

Species of moth

Hendecasis duplifascialis, the jasmine budworm, is a moth in the family Crambidae.

== Description ==
The adult moth is small and pale, with wavy markings on the wings and black patches on the wing margin. It has a pair of well-developed black palps and a scaly proboscis.

The larva has variously been described as creamy yellow or greenish. It can be recognised by: adfrontal sutures reaching the epicranial notch of the head; head and prothoracic shield solid black or brown; the spinneret long and pointed; no pigmented pinacula present on the thorax; prespiracular pinaculum pigmented and extending below the spiracle; prothoracic shield with seta XD2 equidistant from SD1 and XD1, all three setae almost in a vertical line; SV setae of prothorax in the middle of the pinaculum; and SV group on the first abdominal segment trisetose.

The egg is round and initially creamy white in colour, later turning yellow.

== Life cycle and feeding ==
Female moths lay their eggs singly and glued to buds, calyxes and sometimes bud stalks of jasmine (Jasminum sp.). Larvae hatch from eggs and begin feeding on the insides of the flower bud. They eventually emerge and tunnel into other buds of the same shoot. Infested flowers turn violet and fall off the plant. In severe infestations, larvae web together adjacent flower buds using silk threads. They also feed on flower petals.

Eventually, the larvae pupate. They do this in soil and sometimes on the leaves of their host plant, at the junction of petioles and leaf blades. Adults emerge from the pupae to start the life cycle once more.

On Jasminum multiflorum, the life cycle of this species takes 27 days on average. The egg stage takes 3.25 days, the larva stage 11 days, the pupa stage 5.5 days, and adults live for 3.5 days (female) or 3.0 days (male).

== Distribution ==
It is found in India, Sri Lanka, the Comoros, Cambodia, China, Japan, the Philippines and Thailand.

== Management ==
Suggested techniques for managing jasmine budworm include: raking soil during the off season (to expose the pupae) and applying insecticide, applying insecticide at the bases of plants, setting up light traps during the peak emergence of adult moths (to attract and kill the moths), collecting damaged flowers/buds and destroying them, conserving parasitoids of budworm larvae, and proper pruning and hygienic maintenance of bushes.
