= Phenacodes nolalis =

Scientific classification
- Kingdom: Animalia
- Phylum: Arthropoda
- Clade: Pancrustacea
- Class: Insecta
- Order: Lepidoptera
- Family: Crambidae
- Genus: Phenacodes
- Species: P. nolalis

Binomial name
- Phenacodes nolalis (Hampson, 1899)

Synonyms
- Pionea nolalis Hampson, 1899

Species of moth

Phenacodes nolalis is a moth in the family Crambidae. It is found on Sulawesi.

The wingspan is about 20 mm. The forewings are white, the basal half irrorated with black. There is a black dot below the base of the costa, as well as a black antemedial line. The hindwings are semi-hyaline, slightly suffused with fuscous in the terminal area.
