= Epimetasia abbasalis =

Scientific classification
- Domain: Eukaryota
- Kingdom: Animalia
- Phylum: Arthropoda
- Class: Insecta
- Order: Lepidoptera
- Family: Crambidae
- Genus: Epimetasia
- Species: E. abbasalis

Binomial name
- Epimetasia abbasalis Amsel, 1974

Species of moth

Epimetasia abbasalis is a moth in the family Crambidae. It was described by Hans Georg Amsel in 1974. It is found in southern Iran.
