= Fernandocrambus backstromi =

Scientific classification
- Kingdom: Animalia
- Phylum: Arthropoda
- Class: Insecta
- Order: Lepidoptera
- Family: Crambidae
- Genus: Fernandocrambus
- Species: F. backstromi

Binomial name
- Fernandocrambus backstromi Aurivillius, 1922

Species of moth

Fernandocrambus backstromi is a moth in the family Crambidae. It was described by Per Olof Christopher Aurivillius in 1922 and is found in Chile.
