= Hendecasis melalophalis =

Scientific classification
- Kingdom: Animalia
- Phylum: Arthropoda
- Clade: Pancrustacea
- Class: Insecta
- Order: Lepidoptera
- Family: Crambidae
- Genus: Hendecasis
- Species: H. melalophalis

Binomial name
- Hendecasis melalophalis Hampson, 1906

Species of moth

Hendecasis melalophalis is a moth in the family Crambidae. It is found in Australia, where it has been recorded from Queensland.
