= Epimetasia vestalis =

Scientific classification
- Domain: Eukaryota
- Kingdom: Animalia
- Phylum: Arthropoda
- Class: Insecta
- Order: Lepidoptera
- Family: Crambidae
- Genus: Epimetasia
- Species: E. vestalis

Binomial name
- Epimetasia vestalis (Ragonot, 1894)

Synonyms
- Metasiodes vestalis Ragonot, 1894; Epimetasia vestalis rubrilinealis Zerny, 1939; Pionea vestalis Hampson, 1900

Species of moth

Epimetasia vestalis is a moth in the family Crambidae. It was described by Ragonot in 1894 and is found in Turkey and Iran.
