= Fernandocrambus chilianellus =

Scientific classification
- Kingdom: Animalia
- Phylum: Arthropoda
- Class: Insecta
- Order: Lepidoptera
- Family: Crambidae
- Genus: Fernandocrambus
- Species: F. chilianellus

Binomial name
- Fernandocrambus chilianellus (Hampson, 1919)

Synonyms
- Crambus chilianellus Hampson, 1919

Species of moth

Fernandocrambus chilianellus is a moth in the family Crambidae. It was described by George Hampson in 1919. It is found in Chile.
