= Cybalomia ledereri =

Scientific classification
- Kingdom: Animalia
- Phylum: Arthropoda
- Clade: Pancrustacea
- Class: Insecta
- Order: Lepidoptera
- Family: Crambidae
- Genus: Cybalomia
- Species: C. ledereri

Binomial name
- Cybalomia ledereri Rothschild, 1921

Species of moth

Cybalomia ledereri is a moth in the family Crambidae. It is found in Niger.
