= Prolais =

Scientific classification
- Kingdom: Animalia
- Phylum: Arthropoda
- Class: Insecta
- Order: Lepidoptera
- Family: Crambidae
- Subfamily: Cybalomiinae
- Genus: Prolais; Amsel, 1961
- Species: P. elbursalis

Binomial name
- Prolais elbursalis Amsel, 1961

Genus of moths

Prolais is a genus of moths of the family Crambidae. It contains only one species, Prolais elbursalis, which is found in Iran.
