= Fernandocrambus variatellus =

Scientific classification
- Kingdom: Animalia
- Phylum: Arthropoda
- Class: Insecta
- Order: Lepidoptera
- Family: Crambidae
- Genus: Fernandocrambus
- Species: F. variatellus

Binomial name
- Fernandocrambus variatellus Błeszyński, 1967

Species of moth

Fernandocrambus variatellus is a moth in the family Crambidae. It was described by Stanisław Błeszyński in 1967. It is found in Chile.
