= Cybalomia fractilinealis =

Scientific classification
- Kingdom: Animalia
- Phylum: Arthropoda
- Clade: Pancrustacea
- Class: Insecta
- Order: Lepidoptera
- Family: Crambidae
- Genus: Cybalomia
- Species: C. fractilinealis

Binomial name
- Cybalomia fractilinealis (Erschoff, 1874)

Synonyms
- Botys fractilinealis Erschoff, 1874

Species of moth

Cybalomia fractilinealis is a moth in the family Crambidae. It is found in Turkmenistan and Iran.
