= Flavocrambus melaneurus =

Scientific classification
- Kingdom: Animalia
- Phylum: Arthropoda
- Clade: Pancrustacea
- Class: Insecta
- Order: Lepidoptera
- Family: Crambidae
- Subfamily: Crambinae
- Tribe: Crambini
- Genus: Flavocrambus
- Species: F. melaneurus

Binomial name
- Flavocrambus melaneurus (Hampson, 1919)

Synonyms
- Crambus melaneurus Hampson, 1919

Species of moth

Flavocrambus melaneurus is a moth in the family Crambidae. It was described by George Hampson in 1919. It is found in India (Punjab).
