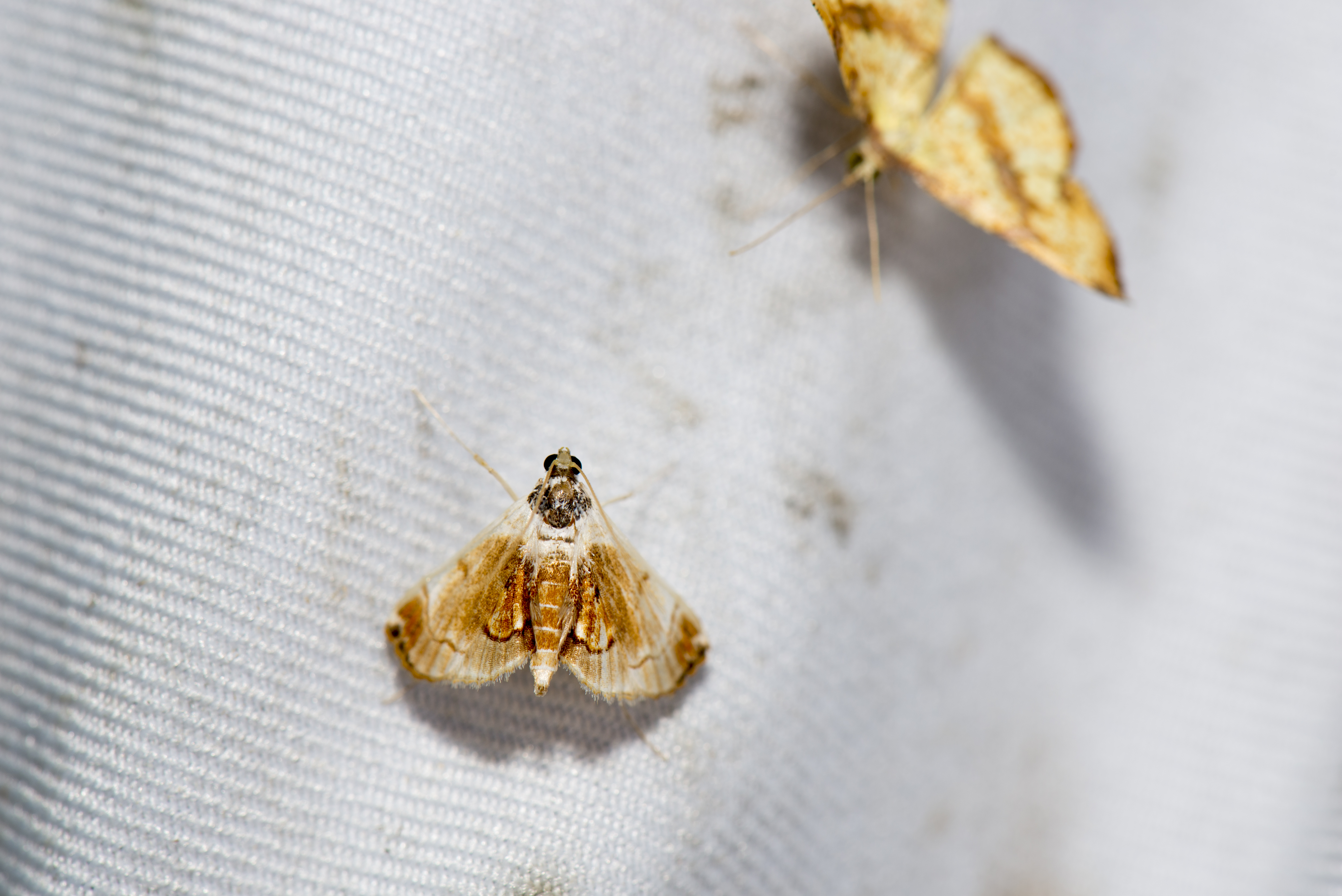

Scientific classification
- Kingdom: Animalia
- Phylum: Arthropoda
- Class: Insecta
- Order: Lepidoptera
- Family: Crambidae
- Genus: Hendecasis
- Species: H. pulchella

Binomial name
- Hendecasis pulchella (Hampson, 1916)

Synonyms
- Endotricha pulchella Hampson, 1916

= Hendecasis pulchella =

Species of moth

Hendecasis pulchella is a moth of the family Crambidae described by George Hampson in 1916. It is found in Taiwan and Japan.
