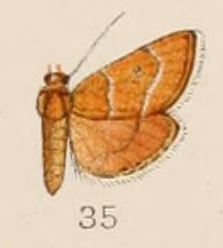

Scientific classification
- Kingdom: Animalia
- Phylum: Arthropoda
- Class: Insecta
- Order: Lepidoptera
- Family: Crambidae
- Subfamily: Cybalomiinae
- Genus: Cybalomia
- Species: C. cervinalis

Binomial name
- Cybalomia cervinalis Hampson, 1908

= Cybalomia cervinalis =

Species of moth

Cybalomia cervinalis is a species of moth of the family Crambidae. It is found in India (Punjab).
