= Microphysetica hermeasalis =

Scientific classification
- Kingdom: Animalia
- Phylum: Arthropoda
- Clade: Pancrustacea
- Class: Insecta
- Order: Lepidoptera
- Family: Crambidae
- Genus: Microphysetica
- Species: M. hermeasalis

Binomial name
- Microphysetica hermeasalis (Walker, 1859)

Synonyms
- Isopteryx hermeasalis Walker, 1859; Falx sinuosalis Amsel, 1956; Parthenodes nymphulalis Hampson, 1906; Sufetula philogelos Dyar, 1922; Falcimorpha philogelos

Species of moth

Microphysetica hermeasalis is a moth from the family Crambidae. The moth was discovered by Francis Walker in 1859, and it is found in Venezuela, Mexico, Central America (including Honduras and Costa Rica), the Antilles and Florida. Its wingspan is 9–10 mm. Adults are on wing from March to June and from November to December in Florida.
