= Fernandocrambus straminellus =

Scientific classification
- Kingdom: Animalia
- Phylum: Arthropoda
- Class: Insecta
- Order: Lepidoptera
- Family: Crambidae
- Genus: Fernandocrambus
- Species: F. straminellus

Binomial name
- Fernandocrambus straminellus (Hampson, 1896)

Synonyms
- Crambus straminellus Hampson, 1896

Species of moth

Fernandocrambus straminellus is a moth in the family Crambidae. It was described by George Hampson in 1896. It is found in Chile.
