= Thyridiphora furia =

Scientific classification
- Domain: Eukaryota
- Kingdom: Animalia
- Phylum: Arthropoda
- Class: Insecta
- Order: Lepidoptera
- Family: Crambidae
- Genus: Thyridiphora
- Species: T. furia

Binomial name
- Thyridiphora furia (C. Swinhoe, 1884)

Synonyms
- Micra furia C. Swinhoe, 1884; Botys cineracealis de Joannis in de Joannis & Ragonot, 1889; Thyridiphora calidella Legrand, 1966; Thyridiphora fenestrata Warren, 1888

Species of moth

Thyridiphora furia is a species of moth in the family Crambidae described by Charles Swinhoe in 1884. It is found in Greece, Lebanon, Pakistan, Niger, Yemen, Seychelles and Kenya.
