= Epimetasia albalis =

Scientific classification
- Domain: Eukaryota
- Kingdom: Animalia
- Phylum: Arthropoda
- Class: Insecta
- Order: Lepidoptera
- Family: Crambidae
- Genus: Epimetasia
- Species: E. albalis

Binomial name
- Epimetasia albalis Amsel, 1959

Species of moth

Epimetasia albalis is a moth in the family Crambidae. It was described by Hans Georg Amsel in 1959. It is found in Iraq.
