= Margaretania =

Scientific classification
- Kingdom: Animalia
- Phylum: Arthropoda
- Class: Insecta
- Order: Lepidoptera
- Family: Crambidae
- Subfamily: Cybalomiinae
- Genus: Margaretania; Amsel, 1961
- Species: M. superba

Binomial name
- Margaretania superba Amsel, 1961

Genus of moths

Margaretania is a genus of moths of the family Crambidae. It contains only one species, Margaretania superba, which is found in Iran.
