= Epimetasia rhodobaphialis =

Scientific classification
- Domain: Eukaryota
- Kingdom: Animalia
- Phylum: Arthropoda
- Class: Insecta
- Order: Lepidoptera
- Family: Crambidae
- Genus: Epimetasia
- Species: E. rhodobaphialis

Binomial name
- Epimetasia rhodobaphialis (Ragonot, 1894)

Synonyms
- Metasiodes rhodobaphialis Ragonot, 1894

Species of moth

Epimetasia rhodobaphialis is a moth in the family Crambidae. It was described by Ragonot in 1894. It is found in Uzbekistan.
