= Goniophysetis actalellus =

Scientific classification
- Domain: Eukaryota
- Kingdom: Animalia
- Phylum: Arthropoda
- Class: Insecta
- Order: Lepidoptera
- Family: Crambidae
- Genus: Goniophysetis
- Species: G. actalellus

Binomial name
- Goniophysetis actalellus Viette, 1960

Species of moth

Goniophysetis actalellus is a moth in the family Crambidae. It is found in Madagascar.
