= Fernandocrambus kuscheli =

Scientific classification
- Kingdom: Animalia
- Phylum: Arthropoda
- Class: Insecta
- Order: Lepidoptera
- Family: Crambidae
- Genus: Fernandocrambus
- Species: F. kuscheli

Binomial name
- Fernandocrambus kuscheli J. F. G. Clarke, 1965

Species of moth

Fernandocrambus kuscheli is a moth in the family Crambidae. It was described by John Frederick Gates Clarke in 1965. It is found in Chile.
