= Cybalomia gyoti =

Scientific classification
- Kingdom: Animalia
- Phylum: Arthropoda
- Clade: Pancrustacea
- Class: Insecta
- Order: Lepidoptera
- Family: Crambidae
- Genus: Cybalomia
- Species: C. gyoti

Binomial name
- Cybalomia gyoti Rebel, 1909

Synonyms
- Cybalomia guyoti Amsel, 1935

Species of moth

Cybalomia gyoti is a moth in the family Crambidae. It is found in Egypt.
