= Flavocrambus aridellus =

Scientific classification
- Kingdom: Animalia
- Phylum: Arthropoda
- Clade: Pancrustacea
- Class: Insecta
- Order: Lepidoptera
- Family: Crambidae
- Subfamily: Crambinae
- Tribe: Crambini
- Genus: Flavocrambus
- Species: F. aridellus

Binomial name
- Flavocrambus aridellus (South in Leech & South, 1901)

Synonyms
- Crambus aridellus South in Leech & South, 1901

Species of moth

Flavocrambus aridellus is a moth in the family Crambidae. It was described by South in 1901 in the Transactions of the Entomological Society of London. It is found in China (Hubei, Shensi).
