= Thyridiphora gilva =

Scientific classification
- Kingdom: Animalia
- Phylum: Arthropoda
- Clade: Pancrustacea
- Class: Insecta
- Order: Lepidoptera
- Family: Crambidae
- Genus: Thyridiphora
- Species: T. gilva

Binomial name
- Thyridiphora gilva (Turner, 1926)

Synonyms
- Thyridophora gilva Turner, 1926

Species of insect

Thyridiphora gilva is a species of moth in the family Crambidae. It is found in Australia, including Queensland.
