= Prochoristis malekalis =

Scientific classification
- Domain: Eukaryota
- Kingdom: Animalia
- Phylum: Arthropoda
- Class: Insecta
- Order: Lepidoptera
- Family: Crambidae
- Genus: Prochoristis
- Species: P. malekalis

Binomial name
- Prochoristis malekalis Amsel, 1961

Species of moth

Prochoristis malekalis is a moth in the family Crambidae. It is found in Iran.
