= Fernandocrambus falklandicellus =

Scientific classification
- Kingdom: Animalia
- Phylum: Arthropoda
- Class: Insecta
- Order: Lepidoptera
- Family: Crambidae
- Genus: Fernandocrambus
- Species: F. falklandicellus

Binomial name
- Fernandocrambus falklandicellus (Hampson, 1896)

Synonyms
- Crambus falklandicellus Hampson, 1896

Species of moth

Fernandocrambus falklandicellus is a moth in the family Crambidae. It was described by George Hampson in 1896. It is found on the Falkland Islands.
