= Microphysetica peperita =

Scientific classification
- Kingdom: Animalia
- Phylum: Arthropoda
- Class: Insecta
- Order: Lepidoptera
- Family: Crambidae
- Genus: Microphysetica
- Species: M. peperita

Binomial name
- Microphysetica peperita Hampson, 1917

Species of moth

Microphysetica peperita is a moth in the family Crambidae. It was described by George Hampson in 1917. It is found in Costa Rica and Guerrero, Mexico.
