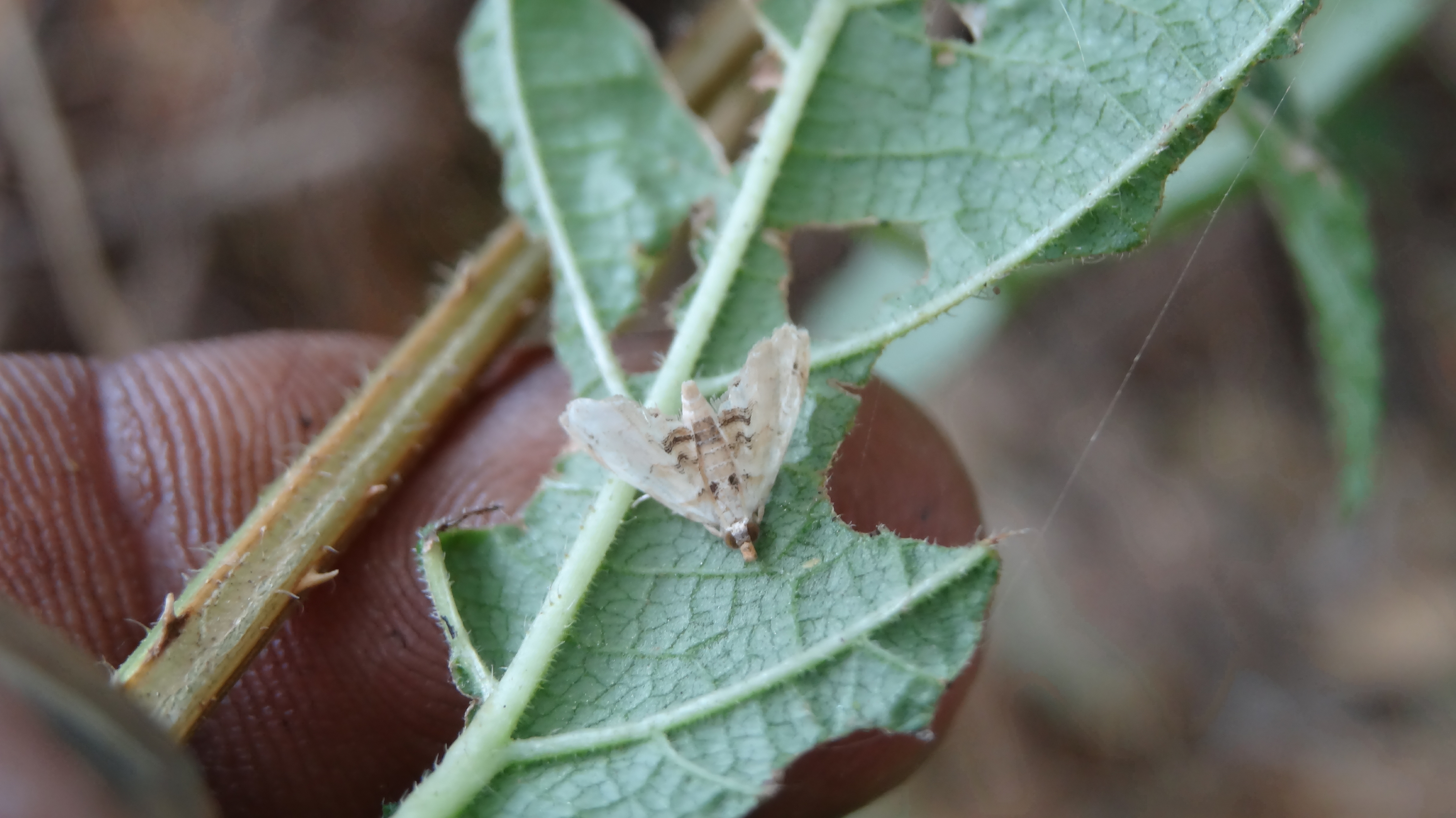
- Hendecasis duplifascialis

Scientific classification
- Domain: Eukaryota
- Kingdom: Animalia
- Phylum: Arthropoda
- Class: Insecta
- Order: Lepidoptera
- Family: Crambidae
- Subfamily: Cybalomiinae
- Genus: Hendecasis; Hampson, 1896

Synonyms
- Neohendecasis Shibuya, 1931

= Hendecasis =

Genus of moths

Hendecasis is a genus of moths of the family Crambidae described by George Hampson in 1896.

== Species ==
- Hendecasis apicefulva Hampson, 1916
- Hendecasis apiciferalis (Walker, 1866)
- Hendecasis duplifascialis (Hampson, 1891)
- Hendecasis fulviplaga Hampson, 1916
- Hendecasis fumilauta Warren, 1896
- Hendecasis melalophalis Hampson, 1906
- Hendecasis pulchella (Hampson, 1916)
