= Prochoristis campylopa =

Scientific classification
- Domain: Eukaryota
- Kingdom: Animalia
- Phylum: Arthropoda
- Class: Insecta
- Order: Lepidoptera
- Family: Crambidae
- Genus: Prochoristis
- Species: P. campylopa

Binomial name
- Prochoristis campylopa Meyrick, 1935

Synonyms
- Ptychopseustis campylopa (Meyrick, 1935)

Species of moth

Prochoristis campylopa is a moth in the family Crambidae. It is found in the Democratic Republic of Congo.
