= Cybalomia lactealis =

Scientific classification
- Kingdom: Animalia
- Phylum: Arthropoda
- Clade: Pancrustacea
- Class: Insecta
- Order: Lepidoptera
- Family: Crambidae
- Genus: Cybalomia
- Species: C. lactealis

Binomial name
- Cybalomia lactealis (Rothschild, 1915)

Synonyms
- Pionea lactealis Rothschild, 1915

Species of moth

Cybalomia lactealis is a moth in the family Crambidae. It is found in Algeria.
