= Fernandocrambus euryptellus =

Scientific classification
- Domain: Eukaryota
- Kingdom: Animalia
- Phylum: Arthropoda
- Class: Insecta
- Order: Lepidoptera
- Family: Crambidae
- Genus: Fernandocrambus
- Species: F. euryptellus

Binomial name
- Fernandocrambus euryptellus (Berg, 1877)

Synonyms
- Crambus euryptellus Berg, 1877; Crambus eryptellus Bleszynski, 1967

Species of moth

Fernandocrambus euryptellus is a moth in the family Crambidae. It was described by Carlos Berg in 1877 and is found in Argentina.
