= Phenacodes aleuropa =

Scientific classification
- Kingdom: Animalia
- Phylum: Arthropoda
- Clade: Pancrustacea
- Class: Insecta
- Order: Lepidoptera
- Family: Crambidae
- Genus: Phenacodes
- Species: P. aleuropa

Binomial name
- Phenacodes aleuropa (Lower, 1903)

Synonyms
- Stericta aleuropa Lower, 1903

Species of moth

Phenacodes aleuropa is a moth in the family Crambidae. It is found in Australia, where it has been recorded from Queensland and New South Wales.
