= Cybalomia arenosalis =

Scientific classification
- Kingdom: Animalia
- Phylum: Arthropoda
- Clade: Pancrustacea
- Class: Insecta
- Order: Lepidoptera
- Family: Crambidae
- Genus: Cybalomia
- Species: C. arenosalis

Binomial name
- Cybalomia arenosalis Rebel, 1912

Species of moth

Cybalomia arenosalis is a moth in the family Crambidae. It is found in Egypt.
