= Epimetasia monotona =

Scientific classification
- Domain: Eukaryota
- Kingdom: Animalia
- Phylum: Arthropoda
- Class: Insecta
- Order: Lepidoptera
- Family: Crambidae
- Genus: Epimetasia
- Species: E. monotona

Binomial name
- Epimetasia monotona (Amsel, 1953)

Synonyms
- Thyridopsis monotona Amsel, 1953

Species of moth

Epimetasia monotona is a moth in the family Crambidae. It was described by Hans Georg Amsel in 1953. It is found in Mauritania, Morocco and in the Western Sahara.
