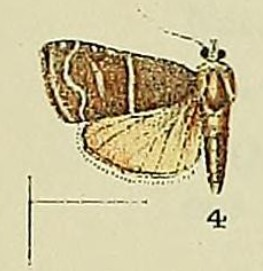

Scientific classification
- Kingdom: Animalia
- Phylum: Arthropoda
- Class: Insecta
- Order: Lepidoptera
- Family: Crambidae
- Genus: Cybalomia
- Species: C. albilinealis

Binomial name
- Cybalomia albilinealis (Hampson, 1896)

Synonyms
- Aporodes albilinealis Hampson, 1896

= Cybalomia albilinealis =

Species of moth

Cybalomia albilinealis is a moth in the family Crambidae. It is found in Yemen.
