= Apoblepta =

Scientific classification
- Kingdom: Animalia
- Phylum: Arthropoda
- Class: Insecta
- Order: Lepidoptera
- Family: Crambidae
- Subfamily: Cybalomiinae
- Genus: Apoblepta; Turner, 1911
- Species: A. epicharis

Binomial name
- Apoblepta epicharis Turner, 1911

Genus of moths

Apoblepta is a monotypic moth genus of moths of the Cybalomiinae subfamily of the Crambidae. It was described by Alfred Jefferis Turner in 1911. It contains only one species, Apoblepta epicharis, which is found in Australia, where it has been recorded from Queensland.
