= Hendecasis apicefulva =

Scientific classification
- Kingdom: Animalia
- Phylum: Arthropoda
- Clade: Pancrustacea
- Class: Insecta
- Order: Lepidoptera
- Family: Crambidae
- Genus: Hendecasis
- Species: H. apicefulva

Binomial name
- Hendecasis apicefulva Hampson, 1916

Species of moth

Hendecasis apicefulva is a moth in the family Crambidae. It is found in Kenya.
