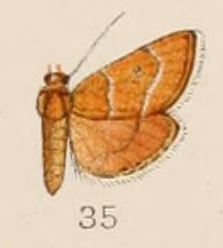
- Cybalomia cervinalis

Scientific classification
- Domain: Eukaryota
- Kingdom: Animalia
- Phylum: Arthropoda
- Class: Insecta
- Order: Lepidoptera
- Family: Crambidae
- Subfamily: Cybalomiinae; Marion, 1955

= Cybalomiinae =

Subfamily of moths

Cybalomiinae is a subfamily of the lepidopteran family Crambidae. It was described by Hubert Marion in 1955.

== Genera ==
- Analcina Turner, 1911
- Apoblepta Turner, 1911
- Centropseustis Meyrick, 1890
- Crambicybalomia Mey, 2011
- Cybalomia Lederer, 1863 (= Cybolomia Romanoff, 1887)
- Erpis Walker, 1863
- Fredia Amsel, 1961
- Goniophysetis Hampson, 1916 (= Leucinocrambus Viette, 1960)
- Hendecasis Hampson, 1896 (= Neohendecasis Shibuya, 1931)
- Hyperlais Marion, 1959 (= Hypolais Guenée, 1854)
- Krombia Chrétien, 1911
- Margaretania Amsel, 1961
- Phenacodes Turner, 1937
- Prochoristis Meyrick, 1890
- Prolais Amsel, 1961
- Ptychopseustis Meyrick, 1889
- Stiphrometasia Zerny, 1914
- Thyridiphora Warren, 1888 (= Thyridophora Hampson, 1896)
- Trichophysetis Meyrick, 1884 (= Alpherakia Ragonot, 1890, Callinaias Warren in C. Swinhoe, 1890, Callinais C. Swinhoe, 1890, Crasigenes Meyrick, 1894, Puriella Strand, 1918, Puriella problematica Strand, 1918, Trichophyretis Pagenstecher, 1909, Trieropis Meyrick, 1886)
