= Phenacodes nigroalba =

Scientific classification
- Kingdom: Animalia
- Phylum: Arthropoda
- Clade: Pancrustacea
- Class: Insecta
- Order: Lepidoptera
- Family: Crambidae
- Genus: Phenacodes
- Species: P. nigroalba

Binomial name
- Phenacodes nigroalba (Rothschild, 1915)

Synonyms
- Polyphota nigroalba Rothschild, 1915

Species of moth

Phenacodes nigroalba is a moth in the family Crambidae. It is found in New Guinea.
