= Epimetasia eoa =

Scientific classification
- Kingdom: Animalia
- Phylum: Arthropoda
- Class: Insecta
- Order: Lepidoptera
- Family: Crambidae
- Genus: Epimetasia
- Species: E. eoa

Binomial name
- Epimetasia eoa (Meyrick, 1936)

Synonyms
- Neoschoenobia eoa Meyrick, 1936

Species of moth

Epimetasia eoa is a moth in the family Crambidae. It was described by Edward Meyrick in 1936. It is found in Iraq.
