= Hendecasis fumilauta =

Scientific classification
- Kingdom: Animalia
- Phylum: Arthropoda
- Clade: Pancrustacea
- Class: Insecta
- Order: Lepidoptera
- Family: Crambidae
- Genus: Hendecasis
- Species: H. fumilauta

Binomial name
- Hendecasis fumilauta Warren, 1896

Species of moth

Hendecasis fumilauta is a moth in the family Crambidae. It is found in India (Meghalaya).
