= Goniophysetis lactealis =

Scientific classification
- Domain: Eukaryota
- Kingdom: Animalia
- Phylum: Arthropoda
- Class: Insecta
- Order: Lepidoptera
- Family: Crambidae
- Genus: Goniophysetis
- Species: G. lactealis

Binomial name
- Goniophysetis lactealis Hampson, 1916

Species of moth

Goniophysetis lactealis is a moth in the family Crambidae. It is found in Kenya.
