= Centropseustis =

Scientific classification
- Kingdom: Animalia
- Phylum: Arthropoda
- Class: Insecta
- Order: Lepidoptera
- Family: Crambidae
- Subfamily: Cybalomiinae
- Genus: Centropseustis; Meyrick, 1890
- Species: C. astrapora

Binomial name
- Centropseustis astrapora Meyrick, 1890

Genus of moths

Centropseustis is a monotypic genus of moths of the family Crambidae. It contains only one species, Centropseustis astrapora, which is found in Australia, where it has been recorded from New South Wales.

The wingspan is 21–25 mm. The forewings are light brownish-ochreous, but the costa is more brownish anteriorly. There is a cloudy white spot in the disc near the base, margined by a short blackish dash beneath. The hindwings are deep yellow with a fuscous band on the hindmargin.

The larvae feed on Melaleuca genistifolia. They are gregarious and feed from within a large nest of webbing. The larvae are reddish-ochreous on the back and ochreous-whitish on the sides. The head is dull brownish-ochreous.
