= Epimetasia =

Scientific classification
- Domain: Eukaryota
- Kingdom: Animalia
- Phylum: Arthropoda
- Class: Insecta
- Order: Lepidoptera
- Family: Crambidae
- Tribe: Odontiini
- Genus: Epimetasia; Ragonot, 1894

Synonyms
- Metasiodes Ragonot, 1894; Thyridopsis Amsel, 1953

Genus of moths

Epimetasia is a genus of moths of the family Crambidae.

== Species ==
- Epimetasia abbasalis Amsel, 1974
- Epimetasia albalis Amsel, 1959
- Epimetasia eoa (Meyrick, 1936)
- Epimetasia gregori Amsel, 1970
- Epimetasia monotona (Amsel, 1953)
- Epimetasia rhodobaphialis (Ragonot, 1894)
- Epimetasia rufoarenalis (Rothschild, 1913)
- Epimetasia vestalis (Ragonot, 1894)
