= Phenacodes epipaschiodes =

Scientific classification
- Kingdom: Animalia
- Phylum: Arthropoda
- Clade: Pancrustacea
- Class: Insecta
- Order: Lepidoptera
- Family: Crambidae
- Genus: Phenacodes
- Species: P. epipaschiodes

Binomial name
- Phenacodes epipaschiodes (Hampson, 1912)

Synonyms
- Lygropia epipaschiodes Hampson, 1912

Species of moth

Phenacodes epipaschiodes is a moth in the family Crambidae. It is found in New Guinea.
