= Crambicybalomia =

Scientific classification
- Kingdom: Animalia
- Phylum: Arthropoda
- Clade: Pancrustacea
- Class: Insecta
- Order: Lepidoptera
- Family: Crambidae
- Subfamily: Cybalomiinae
- Genus: Crambicybalomia; Mey, 2011
- Species: C. ariditalis

Binomial name
- Crambicybalomia ariditalis Mey, 2011

Synonyms
- Crambicybalomia ariditatis

Genus of moths

Crambicybalomia is a monotypic moth genus of the family Crambidae and subfamily Cybalomiinae. Its only species, Crambicybalomia ariditalis, is found in Namibia and South Africa. Both the genus and species were first described by Wolfram Mey in 2011
