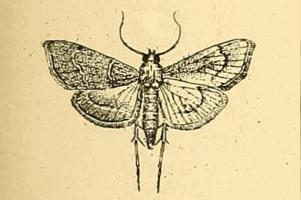

Scientific classification
- Kingdom: Animalia
- Phylum: Arthropoda
- Clade: Pancrustacea
- Class: Insecta
- Order: Lepidoptera
- Family: Crambidae
- Genus: Prochoristis
- Species: P. crudalis

Binomial name
- Prochoristis crudalis (Lederer, 1863)

Synonyms
- Botys crudalis Lederer, 1863

= Prochoristis crudalis =

Species of moth

Prochoristis crudalis is a species of moth in the family Crambidae. It is found on Cyprus, as well as in Syria.

The wingspan is about 22 mm (0.87 in).
