= Cybalomia simplex =

Scientific classification
- Kingdom: Animalia
- Phylum: Arthropoda
- Clade: Pancrustacea
- Class: Insecta
- Order: Lepidoptera
- Family: Crambidae
- Genus: Cybalomia
- Species: C. simplex

Binomial name
- Cybalomia simplex Warren & Rothschild, 1905

Species of moth

Cybalomia simplex is a moth in the family Crambidae. It is found in Sudan.
