= Fernandocrambus augur =

Scientific classification
- Kingdom: Animalia
- Phylum: Arthropoda
- Class: Insecta
- Order: Lepidoptera
- Family: Crambidae
- Genus: Fernandocrambus
- Species: F. augur

Binomial name
- Fernandocrambus augur Błeszyński, 1965

Species of moth

Fernandocrambus augur is a moth in the family Crambidae. It was described by Stanisław Błeszyński in 1965. It is found in Chile.
