= Epimetasia gregori =

Scientific classification
- Domain: Eukaryota
- Kingdom: Animalia
- Phylum: Arthropoda
- Class: Insecta
- Order: Lepidoptera
- Family: Crambidae
- Genus: Epimetasia
- Species: E. gregori

Binomial name
- Epimetasia gregori Amsel, 1970

Species of moth

Epimetasia gregori is a moth in the family Crambidae. It was described by Hans Georg Amsel in 1970. It is found in Afghanistan.

== Subspecies ==
- Epimetasia gregori gregori
- Epimetasia gregori gulbaharalis Amsel, 1970
- Epimetasia gregori panjaoalis Amsel, 1970
