= Fernandocrambus chillanicus =

Scientific classification
- Kingdom: Animalia
- Phylum: Arthropoda
- Class: Insecta
- Order: Lepidoptera
- Family: Crambidae
- Genus: Fernandocrambus
- Species: F. chillanicus

Binomial name
- Fernandocrambus chillanicus (Butler, 1883)

Synonyms
- Chilo chillanicus Butler, 1883

Species of moth

Fernandocrambus chillanicus is a moth in the family Crambidae. It was described by Arthur Gardiner Butler in 1883. It is found in Chile.
