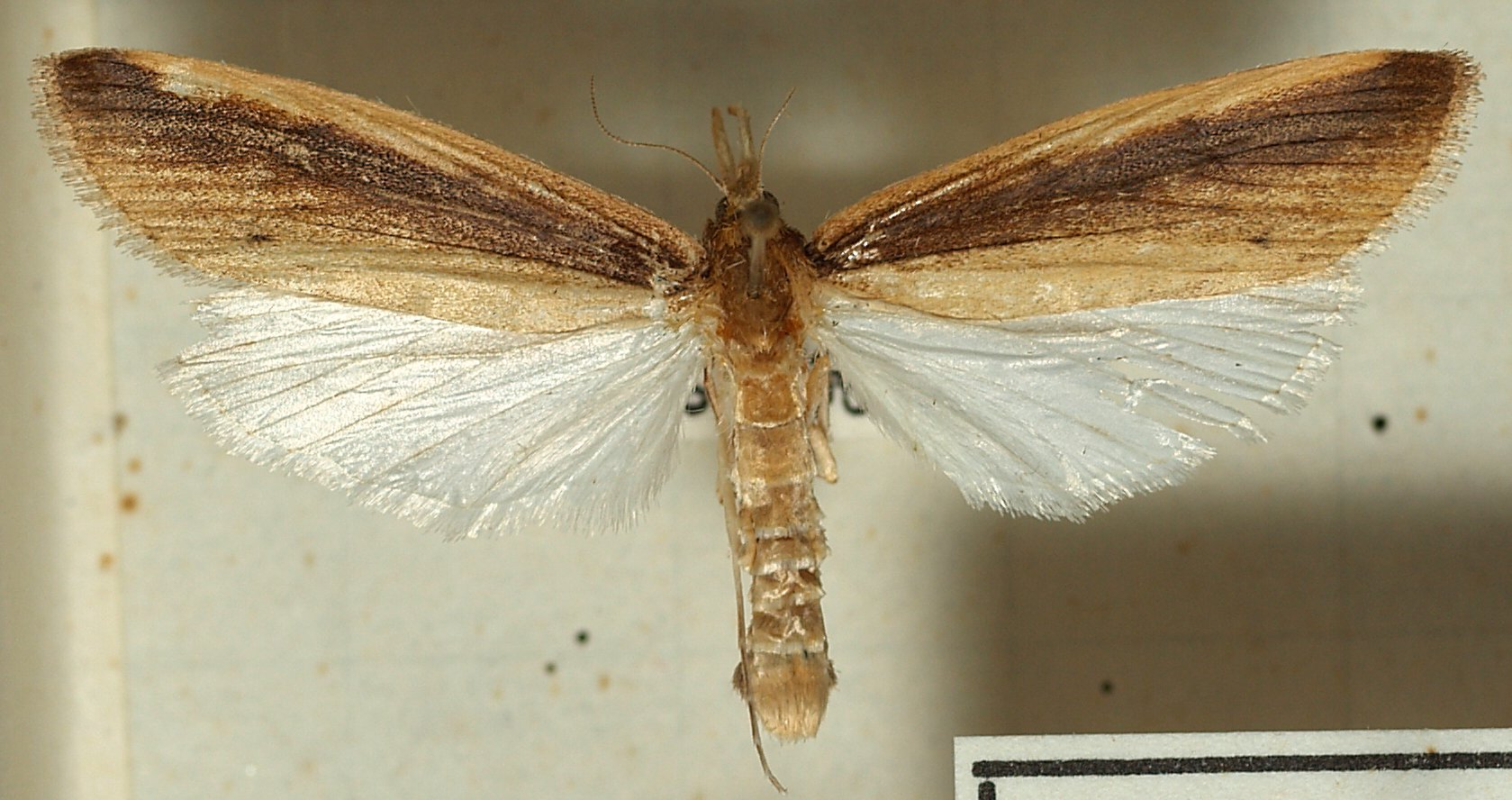

Scientific classification
- Kingdom: Animalia
- Phylum: Arthropoda
- Clade: Pancrustacea
- Class: Insecta
- Order: Lepidoptera
- Family: Crambidae
- Subfamily: Crambinae
- Tribe: Haimbachiini
- Genus: Friedlanderia
- Species: F. cicatricella

Binomial name
- Friedlanderia cicatricella (Hübner, 1824)

Synonyms
- Acigona cicatricella Hübner, 1824; Haimbachia cicatricella (Hübner, 1824); Tinea cicatricella Hübner, 1824

= Friedlanderia cicatricella =

Species of moth

Friedlanderia cicatricella is a species of moth of the family Crambidae. It is found in Europe.

The wingspan of the males is 21–24 mm, and of females 34–38 mm. The moth flies from June to August depending on the location.

The larvae feed on Scirpus lacustris.
