= Microphysetica rufitincta =

Scientific classification
- Kingdom: Animalia
- Phylum: Arthropoda
- Class: Insecta
- Order: Lepidoptera
- Family: Crambidae
- Genus: Microphysetica
- Species: M. rufitincta

Binomial name
- Microphysetica rufitincta (Hampson, 1917)

Synonyms
- Ambia rufitincta Hampson, 1917

Species of moth

Microphysetica rufitincta is a moth in the family Crambidae. It was described by George Hampson in 1917. It is found in Peru.
