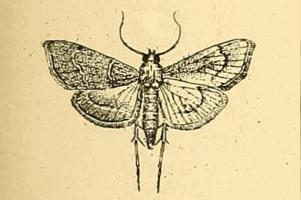
- Prochoristis crudalis

Scientific classification
- Domain: Eukaryota
- Kingdom: Animalia
- Phylum: Arthropoda
- Class: Insecta
- Order: Lepidoptera
- Family: Crambidae
- Subfamily: Cybalomiinae
- Genus: Prochoristis; Meyrick, 1890

= Prochoristis =

Genus of moths

Prochoristis is a genus of moths of the family Crambidae.

== Species ==
- Prochoristis campylopa Meyrick, 1935
- Prochoristis crudalis (Lederer, 1863)
- Prochoristis malekalis Amsel, 1961
- Prochoristis rupicapralis (Lederer, 1855)
