= Hendecasis apiciferalis =

Scientific classification
- Kingdom: Animalia
- Phylum: Arthropoda
- Clade: Pancrustacea
- Class: Insecta
- Order: Lepidoptera
- Family: Crambidae
- Genus: Hendecasis
- Species: H. apiciferalis

Binomial name
- Hendecasis apiciferalis (Walker, 1866)

Synonyms
- Pyralis apiciferalis Walker, 1866

Species of moth

Hendecasis apiciferalis is a moth in the family Crambidae. It is found in China (Shanghai), Russia (Amur region) and Japan.

The wingspan is 10–14 mm.
