= Flavocrambus picassensis =

Scientific classification
- Kingdom: Animalia
- Phylum: Arthropoda
- Clade: Pancrustacea
- Class: Insecta
- Order: Lepidoptera
- Family: Crambidae
- Subfamily: Crambinae
- Tribe: Crambini
- Genus: Flavocrambus
- Species: F. picassensis

Binomial name
- Flavocrambus picassensis Błeszyński, 1965

Species of moth

Flavocrambus picassensis is a moth in the family Crambidae. It was described by Stanisław Błeszyński in 1965. It is found in the Russian Far East (Amur, Ussuri, Askold, southern Ural).
