= Friedlanderia phaeochorda =

Scientific classification
- Domain: Eukaryota
- Kingdom: Animalia
- Phylum: Arthropoda
- Class: Insecta
- Order: Lepidoptera
- Family: Crambidae
- Subfamily: Crambinae
- Tribe: Haimbachiini
- Genus: Friedlanderia
- Species: F. phaeochorda

Binomial name
- Friedlanderia phaeochorda (Turner, 1911)

Synonyms
- Platytes phaeochorda Turner, 1911; Chilo strigatellus Hampson, 1919

Species of moth

Friedlanderia phaeochorda is a moth in the family Crambidae. It was described by Turner in 1911. It is found in Australia, where it has been recorded from Western Australia and the Northern Territory.
