= Analcina =

Scientific classification
- Kingdom: Animalia
- Phylum: Arthropoda
- Class: Insecta
- Order: Lepidoptera
- Family: Crambidae
- Subfamily: Cybalomiinae
- Genus: Analcina; Turner, 1911
- Species: A. penthica

Binomial name
- Analcina penthica Turner, 1911

Genus of moths

Analcina is a monotypic genus of moths of the Cybalomiinae subfamily of the Crambidae. It contains only one species, Analcina penthica, which is found in Australia, where it has been recorded from Queensland.
