= Microphysetica ambialis =

Scientific classification
- Kingdom: Animalia
- Phylum: Arthropoda
- Class: Insecta
- Order: Lepidoptera
- Family: Crambidae
- Genus: Microphysetica
- Species: M. ambialis

Binomial name
- Microphysetica ambialis (Schaus, 1924)

Synonyms
- Stenia ambialis Schaus, 1924

Species of moth

Microphysetica ambialis is a moth in the family Crambidae. It was described by William Schaus in 1924. It is found in Mexico (Xalapa) and Guatemala.

The wingspan is about 12 mm. The forewings are white suffused with light buff and irrorated (sprinkled) with fuscous and black. The base of the costa is black and there is a subbasal black point in the cell. The antemedial line is fine, black and on the median area followed by a small black ocellus in the cell. The costa is clay colour from the antemedial to the apex, with black spots. There are two small white spots on the discocellular, edged with black. The postmedial line is black and distally edged with white and followed by a broad fuscous shade crossed by black lines on the veins. There is subterminal white scaling below the costa and a terminal black line. The hindwings are whitish and the costa and inner margin are smoky grey.
