= Fernandocrambus nergaellus =

Scientific classification
- Domain: Eukaryota
- Kingdom: Animalia
- Phylum: Arthropoda
- Class: Insecta
- Order: Lepidoptera
- Family: Crambidae
- Genus: Fernandocrambus
- Species: F. nergaellus

Binomial name
- Fernandocrambus nergaellus (H. Druce, 1896)

Synonyms
- Crambus nergaellus H. Druce, 1896

Species of moth

Fernandocrambus nergaellus is a moth in the family Crambidae. It was described by Herbert Druce in 1896. It is found in Mexico.
