= Fernandocrambus abbreviata =

Scientific classification
- Kingdom: Animalia
- Phylum: Arthropoda
- Class: Insecta
- Order: Lepidoptera
- Family: Crambidae
- Genus: Fernandocrambus
- Species: F. abbreviata

Binomial name
- Fernandocrambus abbreviata (J. F. G. Clarke, 1965)

Synonyms
- Juania abbreviata J. F. G. Clarke, 1965

Species of moth

Fernandocrambus abbreviata is a moth in the family Crambidae. It was described by John Frederick Gates Clarke in 1965. It is found in Chile.
