= Fredia =

Scientific classification
- Kingdom: Animalia
- Phylum: Arthropoda
- Class: Insecta
- Order: Lepidoptera
- Family: Crambidae
- Subfamily: Cybalomiinae
- Genus: Fredia; Amsel, 1961
- Species: F. tchahbaharia

Binomial name
- Fredia tchahbaharia Amsel, 1961

Genus of moths

Fredia is a genus of moths of the family Crambidae. It contains only one species, Fredia tchahbaharia, which is found in Iran.
