= Flavocrambus =

Scientific classification
- Domain: Eukaryota
- Kingdom: Animalia
- Phylum: Arthropoda
- Class: Insecta
- Order: Lepidoptera
- Family: Crambidae
- Subfamily: Crambinae
- Tribe: Crambini
- Genus: Flavocrambus; Bleszynski, 1959

Genus of moths

Flavocrambus is a genus of moths of the family Crambidae.

== Species ==
- Flavocrambus aridellus (South in Leech & South, 1901)
- Flavocrambus melaneurus (Hampson, 1919)
- Flavocrambus picassensis Bleszynski, 1965
- Flavocrambus striatellus (Leech, 1889)
