= Epimetasia rufoarenalis =

Scientific classification
- Domain: Eukaryota
- Kingdom: Animalia
- Phylum: Arthropoda
- Class: Insecta
- Order: Lepidoptera
- Family: Crambidae
- Genus: Epimetasia
- Species: E. rufoarenalis

Binomial name
- Epimetasia rufoarenalis (Rothschild, 1913)

Synonyms
- Calamochrous rufoarenalis Rothschild, 1913; Pionea simplicealis Rothschild, 1915

Species of moth

Epimetasia rufoarenalis is a moth in the family Crambidae. It was first described by Rothschild in 1913. It is found in Algeria and the United Arab Emirates.
