= Fernandocrambus =

Scientific classification
- Domain: Eukaryota
- Kingdom: Animalia
- Phylum: Arthropoda
- Class: Insecta
- Order: Lepidoptera
- Family: Crambidae
- Tribe: Crambini
- Genus: Fernandocrambus; Aurivillius, 1922

Synonyms
- Juania Aurivillius, 1922; Juanita Munroe, 1995

Genus of moths

Fernandocrambus is a genus of moths of the family Crambidae.

== Species ==
- Fernandocrambus abbreviata (J. F. G. Clarke, 1965)
- Fernandocrambus annulata (Aurivillius, 1922)
- Fernandocrambus apocalipsus Bleszynski, 1967
- Fernandocrambus arcus J. F. G. Clarke, 1965
- Fernandocrambus augur Bleszynski, 1965
- Fernandocrambus backstromi Aurivillius, 1922
- Fernandocrambus brunneus Aurivillius, 1922
- Fernandocrambus byssifera (J. F. G. Clarke, 1965)
- Fernandocrambus chilianellus (Hampson, 1919)
- Fernandocrambus chillanicus (Butler, 1883)
- Fernandocrambus chiloma (J. F. G. Clarke, 1965)
- Fernandocrambus chopinellus Bleszynski, 1967
- Fernandocrambus corvus J. F. G. Clarke, 1965
- Fernandocrambus cuprescens (Hampson, 1919)
- Fernandocrambus derelicta (J. F. G. Clarke, 1965)
- Fernandocrambus diabolicus Bleszynski, 1967
- Fernandocrambus divus (J. F. G. Clarke, 1965)
- Fernandocrambus dolicaon Bleszynski, 1967
- Fernandocrambus euryptellus (Berg, 1877)
- Fernandocrambus falklandicellus (Hampson, 1896)
- Fernandocrambus fernandesellus (Hampson, 1896)
- Fernandocrambus fundus J. F. G. Clarke, 1965
- Fernandocrambus fuscus Aurivillius, 1922
- Fernandocrambus glareola (J. F. G. Clarke, 1965
- Fernandocrambus grisea (J. F. G. Clarke, 1965
- Fernandocrambus harpipterus (Dyar, 1916)
- Fernandocrambus horoscopus Bleszynski, 1967
- Fernandocrambus imitator (J. F. G. Clarke, 1965)
- Fernandocrambus imperfecta (J. F. G. Clarke, 1965)
- Fernandocrambus kuscheli J. F. G. Clarke, 1965
- Fernandocrambus loxia (J. F. G. Clarke, 1965)
- Fernandocrambus magnifica (J. F. G. Clarke, 1965)
- Fernandocrambus minima (J. F. G. Clarke, 1965)
- Fernandocrambus nergaellus (Druce, 1896)
- Fernandocrambus nitidissima (J. F. G. Clarke, 1965)
- Fernandocrambus noskiewiczi Bleszynski, 1967
- Fernandocrambus oxyechus J. F. G. Clarke, 1965
- Fernandocrambus paraloxia (J. F. G. Clarke, 1965)
- Fernandocrambus parva (J. F. G. Clarke, 1965)
- Fernandocrambus pepita (J. F. G. Clarke, 1965)
- Fernandocrambus radicellus (Hampson, 1896)
- Fernandocrambus ruptifascia (Hampson, 1919)
- Fernandocrambus spiculellus (Zeller, 1877)
- Fernandocrambus stilatus (Zeller, 1877)
- Fernandocrambus straminellus (Hampson, 1896)
- Fernandocrambus subaequalis (Zeller, 1877)
- Fernandocrambus truncus J. F. G. Clarke, 1965
- Fernandocrambus variatellus Bleszynski, 1967
- Fernandocrambus xerophylla (J. F. G. Clarke, 1965)
- Fernandocrambus xiphiellus (Zeller, 1872)
