= Friedlanderia =

Scientific classification
- Domain: Eukaryota
- Kingdom: Animalia
- Phylum: Arthropoda
- Class: Insecta
- Order: Lepidoptera
- Family: Crambidae
- Subfamily: Crambinae
- Tribe: Haimbachiini
- Genus: Friedlanderia; Agnew, 1987

Synonyms
- Chiloides Amsel, 1949; Chiloides Bleszynski, 1963

Genus of moths

Friedlanderia is a genus of moths of the family Crambidae.

== Species ==
- Friedlanderia cicatricella (Hübner, 1824)
- Friedlanderia phaeochorda (Turner, 1911)
