= Microphysetica =

Scientific classification
- Kingdom: Animalia
- Phylum: Arthropoda
- Class: Insecta
- Order: Lepidoptera
- Family: Crambidae
- Subfamily: Spilomelinae
- Genus: Microphysetica; Hampson, 1917

Synonyms
- Falx Amsel, 1956; Falcimorpha Amsel, 1957

Genus of moths

Microphysetica is a genus of moths of the family Crambidae. The genus was described by George Hampson in 1917.

== Species ==
- Microphysetica ambialis (Schaus, 1924)
- Microphysetica hermeasalis (Walker, 1859)
- Microphysetica peperita Hampson, 1917
- Microphysetica rufitincta (Hampson, 1917)
