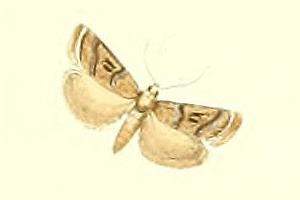
- Keradere tengstroemiella

Scientific classification
- Domain: Eukaryota
- Kingdom: Animalia
- Phylum: Arthropoda
- Class: Insecta
- Order: Lepidoptera
- Family: Pyralidae
- Tribe: Phycitini
- Genus: Keradere; Whalley, 1970

Synonyms
- Praesalebria Amsel, 1954

= Keradere =

Genus of moths

Keradere is a genus of snout moths. It was described by Whalley in 1970.

== Species ==
- Keradere lepidella (Ragonot, 1887)
- Keradere noctivaga (Staudinger, 1879)
- Keradere tengstroemiella (Erschoff, 1874)
