= Keradere lepidella =

Scientific classification
- Domain: Eukaryota
- Kingdom: Animalia
- Phylum: Arthropoda
- Class: Insecta
- Order: Lepidoptera
- Family: Pyralidae
- Genus: Keradere
- Species: K. lepidella

Binomial name
- Keradere lepidella (Ragonot, 1887)

Synonyms
- Salebria lepidella Ragonot, 1887

Species of moth

Keradere lepidella is a species of snout moth. It is found in Greece, North Macedonia and Turkey.

Its wingspan is about 22 mm.
