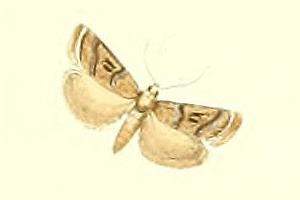

Scientific classification
- Domain: Eukaryota
- Kingdom: Animalia
- Phylum: Arthropoda
- Class: Insecta
- Order: Lepidoptera
- Family: Pyralidae
- Genus: Keradere
- Species: K. tengstroemiella

Binomial name
- Keradere tengstroemiella (Erschoff, 1874)

Synonyms
- Myelois tengstroemiella Erschoff, 1874

= Keradere tengstroemiella =

Species of moth

Keradere tengstroemiella is a species of snout moth. It is found in Greece, North Macedonia, Turkey, Turkestan and Russia.

The wingspan is 15–17 mm.
