= Keradere noctivaga =

Scientific classification
- Kingdom: Animalia
- Phylum: Arthropoda
- Class: Insecta
- Order: Lepidoptera
- Family: Pyralidae
- Genus: Keradere
- Species: K. noctivaga

Binomial name
- Keradere noctivaga (Staudinger, 1879)

Synonyms
- Pempelia noctivaga Staudinger, 1879

Species of moth

Keradere noctivaga is a species of snout moth. It is found on Cyprus and in Asia Minor.

The wingspan is 16–19 mm.
