= List of moths of Iran =

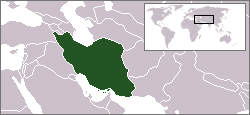
Location of Iran

There are over 4000 known moth species in Iran. Moths (mostly nocturnal) and butterflies (mostly diurnal) together make up the taxonomic order Lepidoptera.

In 2023 the results of a 13-year megaproject about the Lepidoptera of Iran were produced as Lepidoptera Iranica. It was published as a special issue of Integrative Systematics: Stuttgart Contributions to Natural History and provides a comprehensive overview of the Lepidoptera of Iran. It involved an international collaboration between 73 researchers, who reviewed published and unpublished data. The project was led and edited by Hossein Rajaei of the State Museum of Natural History Stuttgart in Germany) and Ole Karsholt of the Natural History Museum of Denmark.

The authors also added hundreds of new records from institutional and private collections. In total, 4,812 butterfly and moth species were documented as part of the project, including the first records of three families and 182 species for Iran. Four species new to science were discovered and several taxonomic changes were proposed. The special issue also provides a historical overview of lepidopterology in Iran, as well as an analysis of Iranian Lepidoptera and an estimate of the number of Lepidoptera species still to be discovered. Finally, a gazetteer of sampling localities is supplied.

The following list provides a subset of known moth species, which have been recorded in Iran. A complete list of Lepidoptera of Iran is included in the External links below.

== Brahmaeidae ==
- Brahmaea christophi
- Brahmaea wallichii

== Bombycidae ==
- Bombyx mori
- Trilocha varians
- Penicillifera apicalis
- Gunda ochracea
- Gunda javanica
- Epia capsivora

== Lasiocampidae ==
- Malacosoma castrensis
- Malacosoma neustria
- Malacosoma parallela
- Eriogaster lanestris
- Eriogaster amygdali
- Eriogaster philipsi
- Eriogaster acanthophylli
- Eriogaster neogena
- Lasiocampa eversmanni
- Lasiocampa bufo
- Lasiocampa trifolii
- Lasiocampa quercus
- Lasiocampa terreni
- Lasiocampa grandis
- Lasiocampa piontkovskii
- Chondrostega aurivillii
- Chondrostega hyrcana
- Chilena cuneata
- Chilena sordida
- Chilena laristana
- Chilena prixina
- Sena proxima
- Epicnaptera albofasciata
- Pachypasa otus
- Taragama repanda
- Taragama siva
- Taragama amygdali
- Phyllodesma tremulifolia
- Phyllodesma glasunovi
- Phyllodesma farahae
- Trichiura mirzayani
- Trichiura pistaciae

== Saturnidae ==
- Neoris huttoni
- Saturnia pyri
- Aglia tau
- Eudia pavonia
- Actias selene
- Actias maenas
- Attacus atlas
- Archaeoattacus edwardsii
- Samia cynthia
- Antheraea helferi
- Caligula anna
- Loepa katinka

== Lemoniidae ==
- Lemonia peilei
- Lemonia pia

== Sphingidae ==
- Theretra alecto
- Theretra boisduvalii
- Acherontia atropos
- Acherontia styx
- Hyles hippophaes
- Hyles centralasiae
- Hyles euphorbiae
- Hyles livornica
- Hyles nicaea
- Hyles zygophylli
- Rethera brandti
- Rethera komarovi
- Hippotion celerio
- Agrius convolvuli
- Hemaris croatica
- Hemaris tityus
- Hemaris fuciformis
- Akbesia davidi
- Kentrochrysalis elegans
- Deilephila elpenor
- Deilephila porcellus
- Smerinthus kindermanni
- Smerinthus ocellatus
- Clarina kotschyi
- Daphnis nerii
- Laothoe populi populeti
- Proserpinus proserpina
- Marumba quercus
- Macroglossum stellatarum
- Mimas tiliae
- Sphinx pinastri
- Sphingonaepiopsis gorgoniades
- Acosmeryx anceus
- Acosmeryx naga
- Acosmeryx sericeus
- Ampelophaga rubiginosa
- Apocalypsis velox
- Theretra castanea
- Theretra clotho

== Arctiidae ==
- Eilema pseudocomplanum
- Eilema pygmaeolum
- Utetheisa pulchella
- Utetheisa lotrix
- Arctia villica
- Arctia caja
- Arctia festiva
- Volgarctia spectabilis
- Chelis maculosa
- Chelis reticulata
- Lithosia quadra
- Manulea palliatella hyrcana
- Lithosia pseudocomplana
- Argina cribraria
- Ocnogyna loewii loewii
- Ocnogyna loewii armena
- Euprepia rivularis
- Diacrisia urticae
- Axiopoena maura
- Lacydes semiramis
- Rhyparia purpurata
- Phragmatobia fuliginosa
- Phragmatobia placida
- Callimorpha dominula
- Callimorpha quadripunctaria
- Euplagia splendidior
- Meganola venusta
- Meganola strigula
- Nola chlamitulalis
- Nola squalida
- Nola haronni
- Nola turanica
- Paidia conjuncta
- Creatonotos gangis
- Parasemia plantaginis
- Pelosia muscerda
- Pelosia obtusa
- Amata hyrcana
- Amata nigricornis
- Amata phegea
- Arctia flavia
- Argina astraea
- Axiopoena fluviatilis
- Chelis reticulata
- Creataloum arabicum
- Creatonotos arabica
- Creatonotos gracilis
- Creatonotos omanirana
- Cymbalophora rivularis
- Diacrisia sannio
- Dysauxes famula
- Dysauxes parvigutta
- Dysauxes punctata
- Ebertarctia nordstroemi
- Eilema arideola
- Eilema arundineola
- Eilema aurantia
- Eilema aureola
- Eilema banghaasi
- Eilema beckeri
- Eilema flaveola
- Eilema gilveola
- Eilema grisea
- Eilema hyrcana
- Eilema iberica
- Eilema marcida
- Eilema obscura
- Eilema orientalis
- Eilema palleola
- Eilema palliatella
- Eilema peluri
- Eilema petreola
- Eilema saerdabensis
- Eilema sericeoalba
- Eilema sericeola
- Eilema sordidula
- Eilema sororculum
- Eilema unita
- Eilema vitellina
- Euplagia quadripunctaria
- Manulea pseudocomplana
- Manulea pygmaeola
- Manulea unita
- Nebrarctia semiramis
- Neeressa palawanensis
- Paidia elegantia
- Syntomis persica
- Utetheisa callima
- Watsonarctia casta
- Wittia sororcula

== Lymantriidae ==
- Orgyia dubia
- Orgyia gonostigma
- Orgyia recens
- Dicallomera fascelina
- Euproctis similis
- Euproctis phaeorrhaea
- Euproctis cervina
- Euproctis chrysorrhoea
- Euproctis karghalica
- Porthesia melania
- Arctornis chrysorrhaea
- Lymantria dispar
- Lymantria amabilis
- Lymantria destitute
- Lymantria lapidicola
- Lymantria komarovi
- Laelia richteri
- Leucoma salicis
- Leucoma wiltshirei
- Ocneria signatoria
- Ocneria insolita
- Ocneria iranica
- Ocneria audeoudi
- Ocnerogyia amanda
- Casama vilis
- Casama innotata
- Ocnerogyia terebynthina
- Ocnerogyia signatoria
- Subacronicta centralis

== Noctuidae ==
=== Condicinae ===
- Hadjina lutosa subflava Hacker and Ebert, 2002
- Cryphia eucta Hampson, 1908
- Cryphia argentacea Bytinski-Salz & Brandt, 1937
- Cryphia eucharista Boursin, 1960
- Cryphia salomonis Boursin, 1954
- Cryphia klapperichi Boursin, 1960
- Victrix sassanica Wiltshire, 1961
- Victrix macrosema Boursin, 1957
- Dysmilichia mira Brandt, 1938
- Dysmilichia phaulopsis Brandt, 1938
- Dysmilichia erastrioides Brandt, 1938
- Dysmilichia gigantea Brandt, 1941
- Stenodrina agramma Brandt, 1938
- Caradrina panurgia Boursin, 1939

=== Herminiinae ===
- Polypogon lunalis
- Herminia proxima

=== Raphiinae ===
- Raphia cheituna

=== Rivulinae ===
- Colobochyla salicalis
- Raparna amseli
- Raparna erubescens
- Raparna conicephala

=== Hypeninae ===
- Rhynchodontodes revolutalis
- Rhynchodontodes orientis
- Rhynchodontodes ravalis
- Rhynchodontodes ravulalis
- Hypena munitalis
- Hypena indicatalis
- Hypena abyssinalis
- Hypena extensalis
- Hypena obsitalis
- Hyrcanypena schwingenschussi
- Mekrania punctalis

=== Scoliopteryginae ===
- Scolipteryx libatrix

=== Catocalinae ===
- Mormonia mesopotamica
- Catocala lesbia
- Catocala abacta
- Catocala neonympha
- Catocala fraxini
- Catocala electa
- Catocala puerpera
- Catocala elocata
- Catocala nymphagoga
- Catocala promissa
- Catocala optima
- Catocala deducta
- Catocala lupina
- Catocala fredi
- Ephesia luscinia
- Ephesia nymphae
- Minucia bimaculata
- Minucia lunaris
- Pericyma squalens
- Pericyma albidentaria
- Pericyma signata
- Pericyma glaucinans
- Lygephila craccae
- Heteropalpia vetusta
- Drasteria sinuosa
- Drasteria flexuosa
- Drasteria picta
- Drasteria cailino
- Drasteria yerburyi
- Prodotis stolida
- Aleucanitis caucasica
- Plecoptera reflexa
- Anumeta arenosa
- Anumeta atrosignata
- Tarachephia hueberti
- Ophiusa pancerorum
- Ophiusa tirhaca
- Aedia funesta
- Acantholipes regularis
- Acantholipes circumdata
- Acantholipes affinis
- Grammodes bifasciana
- Grammodes geometrica
- Grammodes paerambar
- Dysgonia algira
- Dysgonia torrida
- Dysgonia latifascia
- Clytie syriaca
- Clytie delunaris
- Clytie benenotata
- Clytie devia
- Clytie terrulenta
- Clytie iranica
- Clytie distincta
- Gonospileia munita
- Chalciope hyppasia
- Pandesma anysa
- Apopestes spectrum
- Autophila asiatica
- Autophila cerealis
- Autophila luxuriosa
- Autophila osthelderi
- Autophila ligaminosa
- Autophila limbata
- Autophila bang-haasi
- Autophila depressa
- Autophila libanotica perornata
- Autophila subfusca
- Autophila gracilis
- Autophila hirstua
- Catephia alchymista
- Marsipiophora christophi
- Tyta luctuosa
- Cortyta dispar
- Cortyta impar
- Gnamptonyx vilis
- Epharmottomena tenera
- Epharmottomena leucodonta
- Iranada turcorum
- Acrobyla kneuckeri
- Acrobyla ariefera
- Armada maritima
- Armada leprosa
- Armada leuconephra
- Armada tarachoides
- Armada ornata
- Armada mira
- Armada panaceorum
- Armada roseifemur
- Armada hueberi
- Armada draudti
- Armada venusta
- Armada funesta
- Armada gelida
- Armada dentata
- Thira robusta
- Tathorhynchus exsiccata
- Anydrophila bang-hassi
- Anydrophila distincta
- Anydrophila horhammeri
- Anydrophila sirdar
- Toxocampa lubrica
- Zethes narghisa
- Zethes nemea
- Cerocala sana
- Leucanitis kabylaria
- Anophia cana
- Calpe nubifera
- Calpe dubiosa
- Africalpe vagabunda
- Syndea pica
- Syndea saisani
- Metopistis picturata
- Procus koutchilou
- Spintherops cerealis

=== Nolinae ===
- Nola aerugula

=== Sarrothripinae ===
- Nycteola asiatica
- Characoma nilotica
- Sarrothripus revayana
- Bryophilopsis roederi
- Selepa docilis

=== Chloephorinae ===
- Earias chlorana
- Earias insulana
- Bena bicolorana
- Paradoxia graellsi
- Hylophilina bichlorana
- Earias chlorophyllana

=== Acronictinae ===
- Acronicta psi
- Acronicta eleagni
- Subacronicta centralis
- Acronicta saadi
- Acronicta taurica
- Acronycta rumicis
- Simyra albovenusa
- Simyra dentinosa
- Simyra nervosa
- Apatele aceris
- Craniophora pontica

=== Cyrphiinae ===
- Bryophila maeonis
- Bryophila iranica
- Bryophila divisa
- Bryophila receptricula
- Bryophila tabora
- Bryophila centralis
- Bryophila taftana
- Bryophila forsteri
- Bryophila muralis
- Bryophila argentacea

=== Euteliinae ===
- Eutelia adulatrix
- Eutelia adoratrix

=== Plusiinae ===
- Abrostola tripartia
- Abrostola asclepiadis clarissa
- Plusia chrysitis
- Plusia gutta
- Plusia festucae
- Autographa gamma
- Cornutiplusia circumflexa
- Trichoplusia ni
- Chrysodeixis chalcites
- Chrysodeixis eriosoma
- Phytometra confuse
- Phytometra bella
- Phytometra consona
- Panchrysia deaurata
- Archanara algae

=== Acontiinae ===
- Eulocastra diaphora
- Eulocastra schah
- Eulocastra bryophiliodes
- Eulocastra mediana
- Eulocastra tamsi
- Naranga aenescens
- Eublemma pallidula
- Eublemma pussila
- Eublemma amoena
- Eublemma albida
- Eublemma ostrina
- Eublemma parva
- Eublemma leucota
- Eublemma parvoides
- Eublemma apicipuncta
- Phyllophila obliterata
- Prottodeltote pyrarga
- Emmelia trabealis
- Prodenia litura
- Acontia urania
- Acontia lucida
- Porphyrinia conistrota
- Porphyrinia suppuncta
- Porphyrinia chlorotica
- Porphyrinia skafiota
- Porphyrinia wagneri
- Porphyrinia candidana
- Porphyrinia pannonica
- Porphyrinia caelestis
- Porphyrinia rosea sinuata
- Porphyrinia drauti
- Porphyrinia nives
- Porphyrinia cochylioides
- Porphyrinia polygramma
- Porphyrinia pseudepistrota
- Porphyrinia aftob
- Porphyrinia compuncta
- Porphyrinia munda
- Porphyrinia jocularis
- Porphyrinia agnella
- Porphyrinia illota
- Porphyrinia uniformis
- Porphyrinia taftana
- Porphyrinia pseudoviridis
- Porphyrinia bifasciata
- Porphyrinia microptera
- Porphyrinia murati
- Porphyrinia angella
- Porphyrinia parvoides
- Porphyrinia apicipunctalis
- Porphyrinia boursini
- Odice arcuinna
- Ozabra sancta
- Pseudoozarba mesozona
- Thalerastrina tansina
- Amyna punctum
- Leptosia velox rubescens
- Leptosia sefidi
- Glaphyra lacernaria
- Glaphyra communimacula
- Tephrochares inquinata
- Chionoxantha margarita
- Tarache luctuosa
- Tarache audeoudi
- Tarache umbrifera
- Tarache opalinoides
- Tarache biskrensis
- Hoplotarache sordescens
- Hoplotarache costalis
- Fredina esmeralda

=== Cuculliinae ===
- Cucullia maracandica
- Cucullia boryphora
- Cucullia argentina
- Cucullia santonici
- Cucullia hemidiaphana
- Cucullia tecca
- Cucullia anceps
- Cucullia tanaceti
- Cucullia khorassana
- Shargacucullia scrophularia
- Shragacucullia barthae
- Shragacucullia verbasci
- Shragacucullia lychnitis
- Pseudocopicucullia syrtana
- Metopoceras omar
- Metopoceras beata
- Metalopha liturata
- Cleophana charbordis
- Cleophana baetica
- Omphalophana anatolica
- Calophasia casta
- Oncocnemis mongolica iranica
- Oncocnemis erythropsis
- Oncocnemis indioglypha
- Oncocnemis strioligera
- Callierges ramosa

=== Psaphidinae ===
- Brachionycha atossa

=== Stiriinae ===
- Athetmia pallida
- Synthymia solituda
- Synthymia dubiosa
- Paraegle ochracea
- Aegle iranica
- Aegle mimetes

=== Heliothinae ===
- Heliothis maritima Graslin, 1855
- Heliothis nubigera Herrich-Schäffer, 1851
- Heliothis peltigera ([Denis & Schiffermüller], 1775)
- Heliothis incarnata Freyer, 1838
- Helicoverpa armigera (Hübner, [1808])
- Schinia scutosa ([Denis & Schiffermüller], 1775)
- Periphanes delphinii (Linnaeus, 1758)
- Periphanes treitschkei (Frivaldsky, 1835)
- Periphanes victorina (Sodoffsky, 1849)
- Pyrrhia umbra (Hufnagel, 1766)
- Aedophron phlebophora Lederer, 1858
- Aedophron venosa Christoph, 1887
- Aedophron rhodites (Eversmann, 1851)
- Aedophron sumorita Ronkay, 2002
- Heliocheilus confertissima (Walker, 1865)
- Masalia albida (Hampson, 1905)
- Masalia philbyi (Brandt, 1941)
- Masalia perstriata fuscostriata (Brandt, 1941)

=== Agaristinae ===
- Thiacidas postica

=== Amphipyrinae ===
- Amphipyra pyramidea
- Amphipyra tragopoginis
- Amphipyra tetra pallida
- Amphipyra molybdea
- Elaphria venustula
- Elaphria zobeidah
- Elaphria xanthorhoda
- Elaphria eremocosma
- Elaphria bodenheimeri
- Elaphria hemipentha
- Elaphria brandti
- Elaphria panurgia
- Elaphria pulvis
- Elaphria pseudadelpha
- Elaphria rajobovi pseudovicina
- Elaphria stenoptera
- Elaphria poecila
- Elaphria phanosciera
- Elaphria didyma
- Elaphria wiltshirei
- Elaphria salzi
- Elaphria parvaspersa
- Elaphria vicina
- Elaphria atriluna
- Elaphria scotoptera
- Elaphria sarhadica
- Elaphria albina
- Elaphria albersi
- Elaphria assymetrica
- Elaphria khorassana
- Elaphria inumbrata
- Elaphria fergana
- Elaphira pseudalbina
- Elaphira soudanensis
- Elaphira diabolica
- Elaphira flava
- Elaphira alfierii
- Elaphria forsteri
- Elaphria rufirena
- Elaphria clara armeniaca
- Ulochlaena hirta
- Mormo maura
- Phlogophora meticulosa
- Dypterygia scabriuscula
- Paradrina clavipalpis
- Nonagria typhae
- Seasamia cretica
- Eremodrina pertinax
- Meganephria renalis
- Meganephria crassicornis
- Amathes oropotamica
- Amathes macilenta
- Amathes lychnidis
- Amathes modesta
- Polymixis bischoffi
- Polymixis trisignata
- Aporophyla australis
- Xylina exsoleta
- Lithophane lapidea
- Lithophane semibrunnea
- Dryobotodes eremita
- Antitype serpentina
- Antitype carducha
- Antitype chosroes
- Antitype dubiosa
- Xantia ocellaris
- Cosmia trapezina
- Margelana achaemenica
- Margelana flavidior
- Margelana versicolor
- Margelana veternosa
- Stilbina hypaenides
- Arenostola sohnretheli
- Sidemia apothenia
- Parastichtis ypsillon
- Parastichtis mongolypha
- Parastichtis polyglypha
- Parastichtis leucodon
- Parastichtis secalis
- Parastichtis oblonga
- Metapoplus boursini
- Megalodes tengistana
- Megalodes tengistanica
- Ammoconia caecimacula
- Orthosia incerta
- Cloantha hyperici
- Spodoptera exigua
- Spodoptera littoralis
- Spodoptera mauritia
- Spodoptera cilium
- Cardarina quadripunctata
- Caradrina oberthuri
- Dicycla oo
- Perigea illecta
- Hadjina viscosa
- Hadjina lutosa
- Hadjina palaestinensis
- Dysmilichia phaulopsis
- Dysmilichia erastrioides
- Dysmilichia gigantea
- Dysmilichia bicolor
- Dysmilichia bicyclica
- Auchmis comma
- Oligia literosa
- Eremobia ochroleuca
- Crymodes platinea aurora
- Scythocentropus cyrus
- Boursinia oxygramma
- Boursinia symmicta
- Pseudohadena chenopodiphaga
- Pseudohadena schlumbergeri
- Pseudohadena sengana
- Pseudohadena siri roseotincta
- Pseudohadena banghaasi
- Eriopus latereillei
- Eriopus purpureoffasciata
- Polyphaenis monophaenis
- Stenodrina agramma
- Hoplodrina ambigua
- Pseudathetis fixseni
- Haemassia renalis
- Maraschia grisescens
- Enargia badiofasciata
- Oria musculosa
- Calamia virens immaculata
- Eumichtis muscosa
- Bryomima johanna
- Sidema hedygramma
- Sidema gracilis
- Sidema apotheina
- Sidema discalis
- Heterographa tetrastigma
- Heterographa pungeleri
- Scythocentropus inquinata
- Catamecia jordana
- Catamecia ferdovsi
- Arenostola phragmitidis

=== Hadeninae ===
- Discestra trifolii
- Discestra sociabilis
- Leucania vitellina
- Leucania obsoleta
- Mythimna l-album
- Hecatera dysodea
- Lacanobia w-latinum
- Lacanobia thalassina
- Egira conspicillaris
- Hadena laudeti
- Hadena reticulata
- Monima mithras
- Mythimna unipuncta
- Mythimna albipuncta
- Mythimna zeae
- Mythimna loreyi
- Mamestra corsica
- Trichorhiza peterseni
- Polia vidua
- Polia cappa
- Polia serena
- Polia spinaciae
- Polia rhodocharis
- Harmodia lepida
- Harmodia luteocincta
- Harmodia melanochroa
- Harmodia drauti
- Harmodia mesolampra
- Harmodia cimelia
- Harmodia armeriae
- Harmodia magnolii
- Harmodia pumila
- Harmodia luteago
- Harmodia drenowskii
- Harmodia montana
- Thargelia pusilla
- Pronotestra silenides
- Epia capsivora
- Lasiestra vulpecula
- Eriopygodes discalis
- Hyphilare lithargyria
- Sideridis hispanica
- Sideridis punctosa
- Sideridis prominens
- Sideridis putrescens
- Miselia consanguis
- Miselia apinaciae
- Miselia oleracea

=== Noctuinae ===
- Standfussiana defessa
- Yigoga signifera
- Yigoga forcipula
- Yigoga gracilis
- Yigoga orientis
- Yigoga flavina
- Axylia putris
- Agrotis c-nigrum
- Agrotis spinifera
- Agrotis sardzeana
- Agrotis segetum
- Agrotis obesa
- Agrotis crassa
- Agrotis clavis
- Agrotis exclamationis
- Agrotis ipsilon
- Agrotis segetis
- Agrotis puta
- Agrotis serraticornis
- Agrotis forficula
- Agrotis benigna
- Agrotis nigrescens
- Agrotis amasina
- Agrotis wiltshirei
- Agrotis iuguma
- Agrotis facunda
- Agrotis truculenta
- Agrotis elbursica
- Agrotis pasia
- Agrotis squalidior
- Agrotis terminicincta
- Agrotis psammochroa
- Agrotis melanura
- Agrotis illauta
- Agrotis pfeifferi
- Agrotis fredi
- Agrotis fimbriola
- Agrotis laceta
- Agrotis capnistis
- Agrotis glebosa
- Agrotis juvenis
- Agrotis sterilis
- Agrotis maraschi
- Agrotis semna
- Agrotis polygona
- Agrotis nili
- Agrotis hoggari
- Agrotis lupinus
- Agrotis senna
- Powellinia lasserri
- Euxoa hastifera firdusii
- Euxoa canariensis
- Euxoa basigramma
- Euxoa diamondi
- Euxoa perierga
- Euxoa conspiqua
- Euxoa aquilina obeliscata
- Euxoa aneucta
- Euxoa anaemica
- Euxoa heringi
- Euxoa clauda
- Euxoa dolomedes
- Euxoa scurrilis
- Euxoa difficillima
- Euxoa vanensis
- Euxoa inclusa
- Euxoa praestigiosa
- Euxoa lugubris
- Euxoa conspicua
- Euxoa fallax
- Euxoa cos
- Euxoa sigmata
- Euxoa mustelina
- Euxoa adjemi
- Euxoa cognita
- Euxoa dsheiron
- Euxoa temera
- Rhyacia lucipeta
- Rhyacia sollers
- Rhyacia simulans
- Rhyacia insignata
- Rhyacia consenscens
- Rhyacia damnata
- Rhyacia helvetina deliciosa
- Rhyacia squalida
- Rhyacia demavendi
- Rhyacia arenacea
- Rhyacia nyctymerina
- Rhyacia elegans anatolica
- Rhyacia cacumena
- Rhyacia sareptana
- Rhyacia eminens
- Rhyacia latens
- Rhyacia lucernea
- Rhyacia larixia
- Rhyacia alpestris ponticola
- Peridroma saucia
- Anaplectoides prasina
- Triphaena janthina
- Dichagyris squalorum
- Dichagyris melanura
- Dichagyris celebrata
- Dichagyris singularis
- Dichagyris subsqualorum opulenta
- Dichagyris tyrannus
- Dichagyris taftana
- Dichagyris leucomelas
- Dichagyris subsquualorum
- Ochropleura flammatra
- Ochropleura anastasia
- Ochropleura wiltshirei
- Xestia xanthographa
- Xestia palaestinensis
- Noctua orbona
- Noctua comes
- Noctua pronuba
- Eugnorisma semiramis
- Eugnorisma miniago
- Scotia ipsilon
- Chersotis hahni
- Chersotis sarhada
- Chersotis nitens
- Chersotis binaloudi
- Ogygia improceranachadira
- Ogygia mirabica
- Ogygia strenua
- Opigenapolygona obscurata
- Polytela cliens

=== Unassigned ===
- Brandtia albonigra
- Achaea finita
- Achaea lienardi
- Acontia imitatrix
- Acontia transfigurata
- Agoma trimenii
- Anomis erosa
- Anomis sabulifera
- Anticarsia irrorata
- Argyrogramma signata
- Callopistria maillardi
- Ctenoplusia dorfmeisteri
- Cyligramma latona
- Eublemma anachoresis
- Eublemma cochylioides
- Grammodes congenita
- Mocis frugalis
- Mocis mayeri

== Syntomidae ==
- Syntomis phegea
- Dysauxes hyalina
- Syntomis persica
- Dysauxes punctata

== Notodontidae ==
- Cerura pulcherrina
- Cerura turbida
- Cerura syra leucotera
- Cerura bifida
- Dicranura vinula
- Hoplitis milhauseri
- Sumeria dipotamica
- Pyaera pigra
- Stauropus fagi
- Notodonta grummi
- Notodonta ziczac
- Notodonta chaonia
- Pterostoma palpina
- Spatalia argentina
- Harpyia persica
- Harpyia pulcherriana
- Ochrostigma moayerii
- Phalera bucephala
- Exaereta ulmi

== Thaumetopoeidae ==
- Thaumetopoea solitaria

== Geometridae ==
=== Oenochrominae ===
- Orthostixis cribraria
- Myinodes interpunctaria

=== Geometrinae ===
- Comibaena serrulata
- Thetidia smaragdaria
- Thetidia fulminaria
- Thetidia crucigerata
- Phaiogramma etruscaria
- Chlorissa viridata
- Chlorissa faustinata
- Chlorissa discessa
- Chlorissa gelida
- Chlorissa asphaleia
- Euchloris prasinaria
- Euchloris volgaria
- Thalera fimbrialis
- Pingasa laha
- Gnophosema palumba
- Gnophosema isometra
- Neromia pulvereisparsa
- Neromia simplexa
- Microloxia herbaria
- Microloxia prouti
- Microloxia pasargades
- Microloxia indecretata
- Xenochlorodes albicostaria
- Hemithea punctifimbria
- Mixocera parvulata
- Hemidromodes sabulifera
- Aglossochloris recta
- Holoterpha diagrapharia
- Phorodesma graminaria
- Aplasta ononaria

=== Sterrhinae ===
- Cyclophora punctaria
- Cyclophora albiocellaria
- Cyclophora ruficiliaria
- Cyclophora quercimontaria
- Cyclophora linearia
- Cosymbia annulata
- Cosymbia puppillaria
- Cosymbia suppunctaria
- Timandra amata
- Scopula turbidaria
- Scopula beckeraria
- Scopula marginepunctata
- Scopula ansulata
- Scopula flaccidaria
- Scopula ornata
- Scopula decorata
- Scopula immistaria
- Scopula submutata
- Scopula orientalis
- Scopula lactarioides
- Scopula distracta
- Scopula serena
- Scopula caesaria
- Scopula ochroleucaria
- Scopula adelpharia
- Scopula nigropunctata
- Scopula subtilata
- Scopula iranaria
- Scopula minorata
- Scopula pulchellata
- Idaea moniliata
- Idaea antiquaria
- Idaea dimidiata
- Idaea subsericeata
- Idaea trigeminata
- Idaea politaria
- Idaea degeneraria erschoffi
- Idaea degeneraria
- Idaea hathor
- Idaea illustris
- Idaea ossiculata
- Idaea ochrata
- Idaea flaveolaria
- Idaea rusticate
- Idaea laevigata
- Idaea elongaria
- Idaea inquinata
- Idaea politata
- Idaea camparia
- Idaea aversata
- Idaea roseofasciata
- Idaea lucellata
- Idaea textaria
- Idaea obsoletaria
- Idaea talvei
- Idaea emarginata
- Idaea deversaria
- Sterrha sacraria
- Sterrha consanguinaria
- Sterrha rufaria
- Sterrha proclivata
- Sterrha comparia
- Sterrha osthelderi
- Sterrha sabulosa
- Sterrha allongata
- Sterrha wiltshirei
- Sterrha improbata
- Sterrha eremica
- Sterrha microptewra
- Sterrha mimetes
- Sterrha illustris
- Sterrha sanctaria
- Sterrha persica
- Rhodostrophia vibicaria
- Rhodostrophia badiaria
- Rhodostrophia terrestraria
- Rhodostrophia auctata
- Rhodostrophia bahara
- Rhodostrophia yumulosa
- Rhodostrophia nesam
- Rhodostrophia cuprinaria
- Rhodostrophia nubifera
- Rhodostrophia abscisaria
- Rhodostrophia furialis
- Rhodostrophia abcisaria
- Rhodostrophia sieversi
- Rhodostrophia praecisaria
- Somatina wiltshirei
- Glossotrophia asiatica
- Glossotrophia semitata
- Glossotrophia chalcographata
- Glossotrophia origalis
- Glossotrophia gracilis
- Glossotrophia chalcographata
- Glossotrophia benigna
- Glossotrophia rufotinctata
- Traminda mundissima
- Traminda rufistrigata
- Pseudosterrha paulula
- Zygophyxia conscensa
- Zygophyxia relictata
- Brachyglossina chaspia
- Brachyglossina rowlandi
- Brachyglossina sciasmatica
- Rhodometra autophilaria
- Anisephyra sublutearia
- Anisephyra reducta
- Problepsis ocellata

=== Larentiinae ===
- Scolopteryx vicinaria
- Aplocera plagiata
- Aplocera numidaria
- Aplocera opificata
- Aplocera mundulata
- Triphosa sabaudiata
- Triphosa taochata
- Rheumaptera certala
- Rheumaptera montivagata
- Nebula apiciata
- Nebula senectaria
- Nebula obvallata
- Nebula propagata
- Eulithis populate
- Eulithis testata
- Cidaria rectifasciaria
- Cidaria chionata
- Cidaria fulvata
- Cidaria pistascieti
- Cidaria miata
- Cidaria fuscofasciata
- Cidaria obstipata
- Cidaria salicata ablutaria
- Cidaria reclamata
- Cidaria scopulata
- Cidaria unicata
- Cidaria polygrammata
- Cidaria rubidata
- Cidaria saidabadi
- Cidaria peribleta
- Cidaria wiltshirei
- Cidaria rhodoides
- Cidaria bigeminata
- Cidaria longipennis
- Cidaria khorassana
- Cidaria distinctata
- Cataclysme riguata
- Catarhoe putridaria
- Catarhoe arachne
- Catarhoe permixtaria
- Protorhoe renodata
- Protorhoe crebrolineata
- Protorhoe turkmenaria
- Perizoma albulatum
- Camptogramma bilineatum
- Euphyia sintenisi
- Euphyia chalusata
- Eupithecia laquaearia
- Eupithecia quercetia
- Eupithecia mirificata
- Eupithecia tesserata
- Eupithecia husseini
- Eupithecia ridiculata
- Eupithecia fuscopunctata
- Eupithecia irritaria
- Eupithecia bastelbergeri
- Eupithecia cheituna
- Eupithecia sectila
- Eupithecia montanata
- Eupithecia scalptata
- Eupithecia gratiosata
- Eupithecia harenosa
- Eupithecia sincera
- Eupithecia aradjouna
- Eupithecia asperata
- Eupithecia prouti
- Eupithecia costisignata
- Eupithecia mohamedana
- Eupithecia aequabila
- Eupithecia siata
- Eupithecia ultimaria
- Eupithecia salami
- Eupithecia aduncata
- Eupithecia tenellata
- Eupithecia mekrana
- Eupithecia opisthographata
- Eupithecia frontosa
- Eupithecia innotata
- Eupithecia variostrigata
- Eupithecia nachadira
- Eupithecia keredjana
- Eupithecia obtines
- Eupithecia mekrana
- Eupithecia relaxata
- Eupithecia linariata
- Eupithecia limbata
- Eupithecia decipiens
- Eupithecia irriguata
- Eupithecia exactata
- Eupithecia mesogrammata
- Eupithecia extremata
- Eupithecia extraversaria
- Eupithecia centaureata
- Eupithecia accurata
- Eupithecia breviculata
- Eupithecia vulgata
- Eupithecia icterata
- Eupithecia impurata
- Eupithecia lithographata
- Eupithecia sutiliata
- Eupithecia distinctaria
- Eupithecia pimpinellata
- Eupithecia parallelaria
- Eupithecia opistographata
- Eupithecia inconspicuata
- Eupithecia despectaria
- Eupithecia terrenata
- Eupithecia demetana
- Eupithecia gluptata
- Eupithecia subpulchrata
- Eupithecia conviva
- Eupithecia separata
- Eupithecia kopetdaghica
- Eupithecia ochrovittata
- Lythria purpuraria
- Lythria rotaria
- Lithostege flavicornata
- Lithostege buxtoni
- Lithostege farinata
- Lithostege grisearia
- Lithostege amoenata
- Lithostege palaestinensis
- Lithostege coassata
- Lithostege griseata
- Minoa murinata
- Oulobophora externata
- Rhoptia marginata
- Scotopteryx elbursica
- Orthonama obstipatum
- Xanthorhoe fluctuata
- Xanthorhoe designata
- Xanthorhoe acutangulata
- Xanthorhoe ferrugata
- Anaitis obsitaria
- Gymnoscelis pumilata
- Gymnoscelis rufifasciata
- Chloroclystis lita palaearctica
- Chloroclystis v-ata
- Stamnodes depeculata
- Phoscotosia antitypa
- Philereme senescens
- Philereme neglectata
- Philereme transversata

=== Ennominae ===
- Perconia strigillaria
- Cabera pusaria
- Heterolocha laminaria
- Therapis flavicaria
- Semiothisa notata
- Semiothisa syriacaria
- Semiothisa fuscomarginata
- Semiothisa rippertaria
- Semiothisa signaria
- Boarmia gemmaria
- Boarmia fredi
- Peribatodes umbraria
- Peribatodes rhomboidaria
- Elophos dilucidaria
- Phasinae petraria
- Tephrina arenacearia
- Tephrina disputaria
- Tephrina inconspicuaria
- Tephrina perviaria
- Tephrina wehrlii
- Tephrina sengana
- Ennomos quercaria
- Ennomos fraxineti
- Ennomos fuscantaria
- Ennomos olivaria
- Ennomos erosaria
- Ennomos quercarius
- Ennomos quercinarius
- Ourapteryx sambucaria
- Ourapteryx falciformis
- Enanthyperythra legataria
- Godonella aestimaria
- Biston strataria
- Biston betularius
- Synopsia sociaria
- Gnopharmia irakensis
- Gnopharmia kasrunensis
- Gnopharmia inermis
- Gnopharmia colchidaria
- Nychiodes obscuraria
- Nychiodes rayatica
- Nychiodes variabilis
- Nychiodes admirabila
- Nychiodes subfusca
- Nychiodes subviridia
- Nychiodes farinosa
- Nychiodes variabila
- Nychiodes leviata
- Nychiodes agatcha
- Nychiodes subvirida
- Nychiodes waltheri
- Nychiodes antiquaries
- Nychiodes amygdalaria
- Chiasma calthrata
- Epitherina bahmana
- Epitherina ghirshmani
- Epitherina rhodopolcos
- Opisthograptis luteolata
- Zamacra flabellaria
- Eilicrinia cordiaria
- Eilicrinia trinotata
- Eilicrinia acardia
- Agriopis bajaria
- Erannis defoliaria
- Erannis ankeraria
- Erannis declinans
- Gnophos nimbata
- Gnophos stevenaria
- Gnophos horhammeri
- Gnophos sartata
- Gnophos gorgata
- Gnophos elahi
- Gnophos cluminata
- Gnophos pollinaria
- Gnophos pelengi
- Gnophos argillata
- Gnophos ali
- Gnophos annubilata
- Gnophos dubitaria
- Gnophos brandtorum
- Gnophos stachyphora
- Gnophos sibiriata
- Gnophos taftana
- Gnophos orthogonia
- Gnophos anophaea
- Gnophos pseudosnelleni
- Gnophos subtila
- Gnophos eurytiches
- Charissa talyshensis
- Charissa asymmetra
- Charissa onustaria
- Charissa adjectaria
- Charissa luticiliata
- Rhipignophos vastaria
- Rhipignophos maledictus
- Eubolia murinaria
- Eubolia hopfferaria
- Colotois pennaria
- Dasycorsa modesta
- Abraxas wehlri
- Stegania dilectaria
- Syrrhodia muselmana
- Eumera hoferi
- Synopsidia phasidaria
- Phaselia decliciosaria
- Phaselia deliciosaria
- Phaselia serrularia
- Phaselia narynaria
- Phaselia kasyi
- Diastictis artesiaria
- Enconista tengistanica
- Enconista autumnata
- Dyscia malatyana
- Dyscia sicanaria
- Dyscia leucogrammaria
- Scodionista amoritaria
- Zamarada minimaria
- Coenina hyperbolica
- Coenina collenettei
- Hemerophila brandti
- Atomorpha hedemanni
- Crocallis mirabica
- Crocallis tusciaria
- Crocallis elinguaria
- Crocallis mirabica
- Scodiomima crocallaria
- Ectropis crepuscularia
- Isturgia disputaria

== Drepanidae ==
- Drepana binaria
- Cilix glaucata
- Cilix asiatica
- Cilix depalpata

== Thyatiridae ==
- Tethea osthelderi
- Tethea ocularis
- Tethea caspica
- Cymatophora osthelderi

== Cimeliidae ==
- Axia theresiae

== Zygaenidae ==
- Adscita statices
- Jordanita chloros
- Procris brandti
- Procris persepolis
- Procris duskei
- Procris sengana
- Procris solana
- Procris micane
- Zygaena pilosellae
- Zygaena seitzi
- Zygaena rubricollis
- Zygaena manlia
- Zygaena cacuminum
- Zygaena speciosa
- Zygaena tamara
- Zygaena cuvieri
- Zygaena haematina
- Zygaena cambysea
- Zygaena minos
- Zygaena purpuralis
- Zygaena rosinae
- Zygaena escalerai
- Zygaena truchmena
- Zygaena chirazica
- Zygaena haberhaueri
- Zygaena carniolica
- Zygaena christa
- Zygaena loti
- Zygaena ecki
- Zygaena viciae
- Zygaena dorycnii
- Zygaena filipendulae
- Zygaena lonicerae

== Limacodidae ==
- Parasa inexpectata

== Pyralidae ==
=== Subfamily unknown ===
- Scotoma shirazalis
- Ceutholopha isidis
- Amselia heringi

=== Galleriinae ===
- Galleria mellonella
- Achroia grisella
- Corcyra cephalonica

=== Pyralinae ===
- Aglossa pinguinalis
- Aglossa aglossalis
- Cledeobia bombycalis
- Cledeobia consecratalis
- Hypotia colchicalis
- Pyralis farinalis
- Pyralis jungeri
- Pyralis comparalis
- Pyralis fulvalis
- Synaphe punctalis
- Actenia persica
- Benderia talhouki
- Dattinia conformalis
- Dattinia rectangula
- Dattinia fredi
- Dattinia colchicaloides
- Dattinia iranalis
- Dattinia sardzealis
- Dattinia hyrcanalis
- Dattinia mimicralis
- Dattinia poliopastalis
- Constantia brandti
- Constantia subargentalis
- Constantia indistinctalis
- Constantia infascialis
- Constantia strictalis
- Constantia baloutchistanalis
- Constantia argentalis
- Bostra bifascialis
- Bostra farsalis
- Bostra luteocostalis
- Bostra pseudospaniella
- Bostra comealis
- Bostra atomalis
- Hypsopygia pfeifferi
- Tyndis bilinealis

=== Epipaschiinae ===
- Lepidogma tamaricalis

=== Phycitinae ===
- Oncocera semirubella
- Eucarphia rippertella
- Epischnia cretaciella
- Epischnia leucoloma
- Epischnia sareptella
- Epischnia arabica
- Epischnopsis oculatella
- Epischnopsis nervocella
- Praeepischnia lydella
- Praeepischnia taftanella
- Praeepischnia irannella
- Epiepischnia pseudolydella
- Epiepischnia keredjella
- Rhodophaea dulcella
- Rhodophaea farsella
- Rhodophaea iranalis
- Rhodophaea senganella
- Rhodophaea khachella
- Rhodophaea taftanella
- Rhodophaea bouchirella
- Rhodophaea chirazella
- Rhodophaea taftanella
- Rhodophaea eburnella
- Myelois pallida
- Myelois circumvoluta
- Myelois flagella
- Myelois pumicosa
- Myelois cribrella
- Myelois cinerea
- Myelois lunulella formosella
- Spectrobates ceratoniae
- Myelois circumdatella
- Myelois micropunctella
- Myelois britannicella
- Myelois constans
- Arsissa ramosella
- Ancylosis cinnamonella
- Ancylosis albicostella
- Ancylosis arimanella
- Ancylosis cinnamomella persicolella
- Ancylosis sefidella
- Ancylosis albicostella
- Ancylosis ormuzdella
- Ancylosis brevipalpella
- Ephestia elutella
- Ephestia oblitella
- Ephestia kuehniella
- Ephestia xylobrunnea
- Ephestia baptella
- Ephestia cautella
- Ephestia inductella
- Cadra calidella
- Cadra cautella
- Merulempista cingillella
- Nephopterix rhenella
- Nephopteryx alpigenella persica
- Heterographis hellenica
- Heterographis candidatella
- Heterographis ephederella
- Heterographis costabella
- Heterographis concovella
- Heterographis subcandidatella
- Heterographis deserticola
- Euzophera bigella
- Euzophera puniciella
- Euzophera eburnella
- Euzophera formosella orientella
- Raphimetopus ablutella
- Homoeosoma costabella
- Homoeosoma praecalcella
- Trissonca muliebris
- Trissonca muliebris
- Ahwazia albocostalis
- Pristophora nigrigranella
- Pristophora khorassanella
- Pristophora velicella
- Pristophora polyptychella
- Taftania oxycyma
- Nephopteryx macrocirtensis
- Nephopteryx rectangulella
- Nephopteryx oxybiella
- Nephopteryx ardekanella
- Nephopteryx cornutella
- Nephopteryx macrocirtensis
- Nephopteryx minimella
- Nephopteryx metamelana
- Epiepinia pseudolydella
- Shirazia monotona
- Arenipes sabella
- Hypochalcia rufivinea
- Salebria komaroffi
- Salebria obductella infernalis
- Salebria nigrosquamalis
- Salebria pittionii
- Salebria mimicralis
- Salebria tchabarella
- Salebria acrobasella
- Salebria noctivaga
- Salebria dionysia
- Praesalebria geminella
- Praesalebria noctivaga
- Praesalebria lepidella
- Praesalebria argyrophanes
- Salebriodes ephestiella
- Plodia interpunctella
- Melathrix praetextella
- Ocrisiodes chirazalis
- Phycita mianella
- Phycita comeella
- Phycita ardekanella
- Phycita taftanella
- Phycita balutchestanella
- Phycita pirizanella
- Phycita kurdistanella
- Phycita teheranella
- Sefidia persica
- Parasefidia benderella
- Ambesa umbriferella senganella
- Hafisia lundbladi
- Aproceratia senganella
- Mechedia pristophorella
- Synoria comeella
- Khorassania hartigi
- Sclerobiodes persica
- Megasis noctileucella
- Megasis tolli
- Divona mimeticella
- Divona parvella
- Laristana sardzella
- Uncinus hypogryphellus
- Sengania ruhmekorfi
- Belutchistania squamalis
- Paraemporia monotona
- Pristocera pallidisignata
- Neopempelia hieroglyphella
- Pempelia dilutella magna
- Pempelia maroccanella
- Pempelia ornatella elbursella
- Psorosodes dalakiella
- Psorosa dahliella
- Psorosa maraschella
- Psorosa mechedella
- Psorosa tochalella
- Psorosa elbursella
- Epilydia liturosella
- Ichorarchis iozona elegiella
- Pterothrix fordi
- Pterothrixidia osmanella
- Pristophorodes khorassanella
- Pirizania salebrosella
- Ormuzdia cameratella
- Oligochroa cineracella
- Eurhodope mira
- Eurhodope bella
- Eurhodope flavella
- Acrobasis nigribasalis
- Acrobasis nigrisquamella
- Ambluncus nervosellus
- Saluria maculivitella
- Ematheudes vittelinella
- Auxacia bilineella
- Syria biflexella
- Candiope uberalis
- Lasiosticha hieroglyphiella
- Tlithyia buxtoni
- Zophodia suberastriella
- Ardekania farsella
- Ardekania sefidella
- Ardekania albidiscella
- Ardekanopsis griseella
- Lymira semirosella
- Prinanerastia gnathosella
- Peoria costella
- Peoria ematheudella
- Neorastia albicostella
- Praerhinaphe monotona
- Acritonia comeella

=== Scopariinae ===
- Scoparia saerdabella
- Scoparia bicornutella
- Scoparia rupestris
- Scoparia ambigualis
- Witlesia silacealis

=== Heliothelinae ===
- Heliothla staudinger

=== Crambinae ===
- Ancylolomia disparalis
- Ancylolomia bitubirosella
- Ancylolomia palpella
- Ancylolomia micropalpella
- Ancylolomia pectinatellus
- Ancylolomia benderella
- Ancylolomia pectinatella
- Ancylolomia affinis
- Chilo phragmitellus
- Chilo suppressalis
- Chilo luteellus
- Chiloides hederalis
- Thopeutis galleriella
- Calamotropha paludella
- Metacrambus carectellus
- Metacrambus jugaraicae
- Metacrambus kurdistanellus
- Metacrambus salahinellus
- Platytes cerussella
- Chrysoteuchia culmella
- Xanthocrambus saxonellus
- Crambus perlellus
- Crambus contaminellus
- Crambus pfeifferi
- Crambus paludellus
- Crambus heringi
- Chrysocrambus linetellus
- Eromene superbella
- Eromene jaxartella
- Eromene bahrlutella
- Eromene ocellea
- Euchromius rayatellus
- Euchromius keredjellus
- Euchromius malekalis
- Euchromius ramburiellus
- Euchromius jaxartellus
- Euchromius cambridgei
- Euchromius pulverosus
- Euchromius cochlearellus
- Euchromius gratiosellus
- Euchromius ocellea
- Pediasia persella
- Pediasia numidella
- Pediasia matricella
- Pediasia alcmena
- Pediasia pseudopersella
- Pediasia contaminella
- Pediasia desertella
- Lamoria anella
- Proceratia caesariella
- Talis iranica
- Surattha stroblei
- Scirpophaga praelata

=== Schoenobiinae ===
- Schoenobius gigantellus
- Schoenobius alpherakii

=== Cyblomiinae ===
- Cybalomia fractilinealis
- Cybalomia pentadalis
- Cybalomia triplacogramma
- Krombia pulchella
- Stiphrometasia sancta
- Stiphrometasia monialis
- Metasia octogenalis
- Metasia virginalis
- Metasia subtilialis

=== Nymphulinae ===
- Nymphula affinialis
- Nymphula nymphaeata
- Nymphula nigrolinealis sordidior

=== Odontiinae ===
- Tegostoma baphialis
- Tegostoma pentodontalis
- Tegostoma uniforma
- Tegostoma moeschleri
- Tegostoma ahwazalis
- Tegostoma paralis
- Aechremon disparsalis
- Noctuelia floralis
- Noctuelia superba
- Noctuelia vespertalis
- Emprepes patealis
- Emprepes chirazica
- Emprepes comealis
- Emprepes chirazalis
- Emprepes palealis
- Emprepes russulalis
- Titanio hyrcanella
- Titanio nissalis
- Heliothela flavomarginalis

=== Evergestinae ===
- Evergestis forficalis
- Evergestis frumentalis
- Evergestis aenealis dimorphalis
- Evergestis affinis
- Evergestis paragrummi
- Cornifrons ulceratalis

=== Glaphyriinae ===
- Hellula undalis

=== Pyraustinae ===
- Prochoristis rupicapralis
- Uresiphita polygonalis
- Loxotege nudalis
- Pyrausta cespitalis
- Pyrausta aurata
- Pyrausta sanguinalis
- Pyrausta trinalis
- Pyrausta praepetalis
- Pyrausta scutalis
- Pyrausta sefidalis
- Pyrausta mechedalis
- Pyrausta lutulentalis
- Apyrausta persicalis
- Udea costalis
- Endotricha flammealis
- Botys dulcinalis
- Botys tesserulalis
- Botys labutonalis
- Anania verbascalis
- Ecpyrrhorrhoe rubiginalis
- Pleroptya ruralis
- Eurycreon klathralis
- Sitochroa palealis
- Euclasta splendidalis
- Euclasta mirabilis
- Nomophila noctuella
- Psammotis pulveralis
- Calaniochrous acutellus
- Ostrinia nubilalis
- Trigononcus evergestalis
- Phlyctaenodes sinuosalis
- Phlyctaenodes foviferalis
- Prorophora albidogilvella
- Synclera interruptalis
- Synclera traducalis
- Loxostege malekalis
- Loxostege farsalis
- Loxostege mira
- Loxostege ustrinalis
- Loxostege palealis anaxisalis
- Loxostege sticticalis
- Pachyzanchla fascinalis
- Pachyzancla licarsicalis
- Elbursia stocki
- Pionea khorassanalis
- Pionea ferrugalis
- Trigonuncus nissalis
- Trigonuncus euergestalis
- Phlyctaenodos platyphaea
- Boursinella metasialis
- Mukia nigroanalis
- Euergestis caesialis
- Tchahbaharia dentalis
- Ercta ornatalis
- Duponchelia fovealis
- Parastenia intervacatalis
- Mecyna polygonalis gilvata
- Psara pallidalis
- Lonostege sulphuralis

== Pterophoridae ==
- Oxyptilus kollari
- Oxyptilus pilosellae
- Emmelina monodactylus
- Leiptilus brachydactylus
- Porrittia galactodactyla
- Merrifieldia calcarius
- Adaina microdactyla
- Agdistis arabica
- Agdistis nanodes
- Agdistis tamaricis
- Buckleria paludum
- Cnaemidophorus rhododactyla
- Gillmeria pallidactyla
- Pterophorus pentadactyla
- Wheeleria phlomidis
- Megalorhipida leucodactylus

== Carposinidae ==
- Carposina ekbatana
- Carposina roesleri
- Carposina sasakii

== Sesiidae ==
- Dipsosphecia schwingenschussi
- Dipsosphecia stiziformis
- Bembecia ichneumoniformis
- Pyropteron elampiformis
- Pyropteron doryliformis inexpectata
- Chamaesphecia consobrina
- Chamaesphecia doryceraeformis
- Chamaesphecia xantho
- Chamaesphecia turbida
- Chamaesphecia brandti
- Chamaesphecia anthracias
- Chamaesphecia modica
- Chamaesphecia mirza
- Chamaesphecia adelpha
- Chamaesphecia fredi
- Chamaesphecia leucocnemis
- Chamaesphecia thomyris
- Chamaesphecia palariformis nazir
- Eusphecia pimplaeformis
- Aegeria apiformis
- Paranthrene tabaniformis
- Synanthedon myopaeformis
- Synanthedon cephiformis
- Synanthedon conopiformis
- Sesia leucopara
- Sesia zimmermanni

== Brachodidae ==
- Brachodes appendiculata
- Brachodes rhagensis
- Brachodes formosa
- Brachodes keredjella
- Brachodes monotona
- Phycodes radiata
- Brachodes diakona
- Brachodes candefacta
- Brachodes candefactus

== Choreutidae ==
- Tebenna bjerkandella
- Prochoreuitis stellaris
- Choreutis nemorana
- Choreutis pariana
- Hemerophila brandti

== Tortricidae ==
=== Tortricinae ===
==== Cochylini ====
- Phtheochroa aureopunctana (Ragonot, 1894)
- Phtheochroa decipiens (Walsingham, 1900)
- Phtheochroa durbonana (Lhomme, 1937)
- Phtheochroa inopiana (Haworth, [1811])
- Phtheochroa jerichoana (Amsel, 1935)
- Phtheochroa kenneli (Obraztsov, 1944)
- Phtheochroa pulvillana (Herrich-Schäffer, 1851)
- Phtheochroa purissima (Osthelder, 1938)
- Phtheochroa subfumida (Falkovitsh, 1963)
- Phtheochroa syrtana Ragonot, 1888
- Phtheochroa variolosana Christoph, 1887
- Cochylimorpha alternana (Stephens, 1834)
- Cochylimorpha armeniana (de Joannis, 1891)
- Cochylimorpha asiana (Kennel, 1899)
- Cochylimorpha brandti (Razowski, 1963)
- Cochylimorpha diana (Kennel, 1899)
- Cochylimorpha discolourana (Kennel, 1899)
- Cochylimorpha eburneana (Kennel, 1899)
- Cochylimorpha elegans (Razowski, 1963)
- Cochylimorpha fluens (Razowski, 1970)
- Cochylimorpha fucosa (Razowski, 1970)
- Cochylimorpha halophilana adriatica Huemer, 2000
- Cochylimorpha kurdistana (Amsel, 1959)
- Cochylimorpha langeana (Kalchberg, 1897)
- Cochylimorpha montana (Razowski, 1967)
- Cochylimorpha nodulana (Möschler, 1862)
- Cochylimorpha nomadana (Erschoff, 1874)
- Cochylimorpha nuristana (Razowski, 1967)
- Cochylimorpha pirizanica (Razowski, 1963)
- Cochylimorpha scrophulana Razowski, 1963
- Cochylimorpha simulata (Razowski, 1970)
- Cochylimorpha straminea (Haworth, [1811])
- Cochylimorpha wiltshirei (Razowski, 1963)
- Phalonidia manniana (Fischer von Röslerstamm, 1839)
- Gynnidomorpha permixtana ([Denis & Schiffermüller], 1775)
- Agapeta hamana (Linnaeus, 1758)
- Ceratoxanthis iberica Baixeras, 1992
- Fulvoclysia forsteri Osthelder, 1938
- Fulvoclysia rjabovi Kuznetzov, 1976
- Fulvoclysia subdolana (Kennel, 1901)
- Eugnosta lathoniana (Hübner, [1800])
- Eugnosta magnificana (Rebel, 1914)
- Aethes argyrospila Karisch, 2005
- Aethes bilbaensis (Rössler, 1877)
- Aethes conversana (Walsingham, 1908)
- Aethes cremonana (Ragonot, 1894)
- Aethes deutschiana (Zetterstedt, 1839)
- Aethes eberti Sutter & Karisch, 2004
- Aethes eichleri Razowski, 1983
- Aethes fennicana (Hering, 1924)
- Aethes flagellana atlasi Razowski, 1962
- Aethes francillana (Fabricius, 1794)
- Aethes iranica Razowski, 1963
- Aethes kandovana Alipanah, 2009
- Aethes kasyi Razowski, 1962
- Aethes lateritia Razowski, 1970
- Aethes luteopictana (Kennel, 1900)
- Aethes margarotana (Duponchel, 1836)
- Aethes moribundana (Staudinger, 1859)
- Aethes pardaliana (Kennel, 1899)
- Aethes persica Razowski, 1963
- Aethes prangana (Kennel, 1900)
- Aethes scalana (Zerny, 1927)
- Aethes spirana (Kennel, 1899)
- Aethes tesserana ([Denis & Schiffermüller], 1775)
- Aethes williana (Brahm, 1791)
- Aethes xanthina Falkowitsch, 1963
- Cochylidia implicitana (Wocke, 1856)
- Cochylidia moguntiana (Roessler, 1864)
- Cochylidia rupicola (Curtis, 1834)
- Diceratura ostrinana (Guenée, 1845)
- Diceratura porrectana Djakonov, 1929
- Diceratura roseofasciana (Mann, 1855)
- Diceratura teheranica Razowski, 1970
- Cochylis amoenana Kennel, 1899
- Cochylis defessana Mann, 1861
- Cochylis maestana Kennel, 1899
- Cochylis piana (Kennel, 1919)
- Cochylis posterana hyrcana (Toll, 1948)
- Cochylis roseana (Haworth, [1811])
- Cochylis similana Razowski, 1963

==== Tortricini ====
- Aleimma loeflingiana (Linnaeus, 1758)
- Tortrix viridana Linnaeus, 1758
- Acleris napaea (Meyrick, 1912)
- Acleris variegana ([Denis & Schiffermüller], 1775)
- Acleris rhombana ([Denis & Schiffermüller], 1775)
- Acleris quercinana (Zeller, 1849)
- Acleris sparsana ([Denis & Schiffermüller], 1775)
- Acleris lacordairana caucasica Filipjev, 1962
- Acleris lorquiniana (Duponchel, 1835)
- Acleris forsskaleana (Linnaeus, 1758)
- Acleris hastiana (Linnaeus, 1758)

==== Archipini ====
- Archips xylosteana (Linnaeus, 1758)
- Archips rosana (Linnaeus, 1758)
- Archips podana (Scopoli, 1763)
- Archips philippa (Meyrick, 1918)
- Archips crataegana (Hübner, [1799])
- Choristoneura lafauryana (Ragonot, 1875)
- Choristoneura hebenstreitella (Müller, 1764)
- Argyrotaenia ljungiana (Thunberg, 1799)
- Ptycholoma erschoffi Christoph, 1877
- Pandemis chondrillana (Herrich-Schäffer, 1860)
- Pandemis cerasana (Hübner, 1786)
- Pandemis dumetana (Treitschke, 1835)
- Pandemis heparana ([Denis & Schiffermüller], 1775)
- Pandemis corylana (Fabricius, 1794)
- Aphelia christophi Obraztsov, 1955
- Aphelia peramplana (Hübner, [1825])
- Aphelia ochreana (Hübner, [1796-1799])
- Aphelia consica Razowski, 1981
- Aphelia viburnana ([Denis & Schiffermüller], 1775)
- Clepsis pallidana (Fabricius, 1776)
- Clepsis rurinana (Linnaeus, 1758)
- Clepsis consimilana (Hübner, 1817)

==== Other tribes ====
- Sparganothis pilleriana
- Cnephasia chrysantheana
- Phatheochra schreibersiana
- Laspeyresia molesta
- Laspeyresia fagiglandana
- Rhyacionia buoliana
- Argyroploce vandarbana

=== Olethreutinae ===
- Olethreutes lacunanus
- Celphya cepitana
- Celphya flavipalpana
- Notocelia uddmanniana
- Bactra furfurana
- Bactra lancealana
- Eucosma obumbrata
- Epiblema graphanum
- Epiblema cirsianum
- Cydia funebrana
- Cydia caecana
- Cydia succedana
- Cydia cosmophorana
- Cydia duplicana
- Cydia pomonella
- Laspeyresia persicana
- Thiodia trochillana
- Epinotia granitana
- Ancylis obtusana
- Ancylis tineana
- Ancylis curvana
- Gypsonoma aceriana
- Gypsonoma euphraticana
- Gypsonoma hapalosarca
- Lobesia botrana
- Enarmonia formosana
- Rhopobota naevana

== Cossidae ==
- Cossus cossus
- Cossus irani
- Cossus freidun
- Cossus araraticus
- Cossulinus herzi
- Catopta kendevanensis
- Dyspessa bipunctata
- Dyspessa ulula pallida
- Dyspessa emilia
- Dyspessa kabylaria
- Dyspessa serica
- Dyspessa minima
- Dyspessa tristis
- Dyspessa bipunctata
- Dyspessa foeda
- Dyspessacossus fereidun
- Hypopta lignosus
- Phragmataecia territa
- Phragmatoecia castaneae
- Zeuzera regia
- Zeuzera pyrina
- Holococerus gloriosus
- Aethalopteryx diksami
- Azygophleps larseni
- Meharia acuta
- Meharia hackeri
- Meharia yakovlevi
- Mormogystia brandstetteri
- Mormogystia proleuca
- Azygophleps regia
- Azygophleps sheikh
- Cecryphalus nubila
- Cossulus argentatus
- Cossulus lignosus
- Cossulus mucosus
- Cossulus putridus
- Cossulus strioliger
- Cossulus zoroastres
- Deserticossus arenicola
- Dieida ledereri
- Dieida persa
- Dyspessa agilis
- Dyspessa albosignata
- Dyspessa alipanahae
- Dyspessa ariadne
- Dyspessa elbursensis
- Dyspessa pallidata
- Dyspessa wagneri
- Dyspessa zurvan
- Dyspessacossus funkei

== Oecophoridae ==
- Ethmia cirrhocnemia
- Ethmia alba
- Ethmia quadrinotella
- Ethmia vittalbella
- Ethmia lecmima
- Ethmia dodecea
- Ethmia candidella
- Ethmia aurifluella
- Ethmia bipunctella
- Ethmia iranella
- Ethmia caradjae
- Ethmia derbendella
- Ethmia amasina
- Ethmia tripunctella
- Ethmia distigmatella
- Ethmia duodecia
- Depressaria purpurea
- Depressaria ruticola
- Depressaria mesopotamica
- Depressaria discipunctella
- Pleurota pyropella
- Pleurota metricella
- Pleurota wiltshirei
- Symmoca costobscurella
- Apiletria purulentella
- Pseudamelia flavifrontella
- Oecophora mannii
- Oegoconia quadripuncta

== Coleophoridae ==
- Coleophora vibicigerella
- Coleophora phlomidella
- Coleophora ulmi
- Coleophora badiipennella
- Coleophora anatipenella
- Coleophora pennella
- Coleophora adjunctella
- Coleophora caespititiella
- Coleophora tamesis
- Coleophora glaucicolella
- Coleophora alticolella
- Coleophora taeniipennella
- Coleophora vestianella
- Coleophora galbulipennella
- Coleophora silenella
- Coleophora salicorniae
- Coleophora onopordiella
- Carpochena aequalella
- Carpochena teheranella
- Coleophora lebedella
- Coleophora botaurella
- Chnoocera lasiocharis
- Chnoocera magnatella
- Coleophora abbasella
- Coleophora adlecta
- Coleophora aegyptiacae
- Coleophora aervae
- Coleophora albidorsella
- Coleophora albiochrella
- Coleophora amasiella
- Coleophora arachnias
- Coleophora arenbergi
- Coleophora bedella
- Coleophora bitlisella
- Coleophora bivittella
- Coleophora botaurella
- Coleophora coronillae
- Coleophora cratipennella
- Coleophora decoratella
- Coleophora discomaculella
- Coleophora eilatica
- Coleophora flabelligerella
- Coleophora fulgidella
- Coleophora gedrosiae
- Coleophora gymnocarpella
- Coleophora haoma
- Coleophora hatamae
- Coleophora hospitiella
- Coleophora iranella
- Coleophora jerusalemella
- Coleophora kandevanella
- Coleophora longiductella
- Coleophora menephilella
- Coleophora namakella
- Coleophora niphomesta
- Coleophora niveopictella
- Coleophora nurmahal
- Coleophora nutantella
- Coleophora pallidata
- Coleophora paragiraudi
- Coleophora parcella
- Coleophora parthica
- Coleophora pauperculella
- Coleophora phlomidella
- Coleophora phlomidis
- Coleophora qulikushella
- Coleophora schahkuhensis
- Coleophora schauffeleella
- Coleophora sogdianae

== Cosmopterigidae ==
- Alloclita delozona
- Alloclita gambiella
- Ascalenia acaciella Chretien, 1915
- Ascalenia callynella Kasy, 1968
- Ascalenia echidnias Meyrick, 1891
- Ascalenia imbella Kasy, 1975
- Ascalenia kairaella Kasy, 1970
- Ascalenia sirjanella Kasy, 1975
- Batrachedra amydraula
- Bifascia nigralbella (Chretien, 1915)
- Bifascioides leucomelanellus (Rebel, 1917)
- Bifascioides yemenellus (Amsel, 1961)
- Calycobathra sahidanella Kasy, 1968
- Eteobalea sumptuosella
- Pseudascalenia abbasella Kasy, 1975
- Pyroderces argyrogrammos
- Anatrachyntis simplex
- Ascalenia heterosticta
- Ascalenia vanelloides
- Ascalenia viviparella
- Bifascioides pirastica
- Calycobathra calligoni
- Calycobathra variapenella
- Gisilia lerautella
- Pyroderces hemizopha

== Scythrididae ==
- Scythris emichi
- Scythris flabella
- Scythris satyrella
- Scythris curlettii
- Scythris senecai
- Scythris ethmiella
- Scythris decrepidella
- Scythris friedeli
- Scythris camelella
- Scythris monochreella
- Catascythris kebirella
- Eretmocera medinella
- Syringopais temperatella

== Gelechiidae ==
- Chrysoesthia drurella
- Ergatis subericinella
- Ergatis decurtella
- Isophrictis striatella
- Ceuthomadarus tenebrionellus
- Metanarsia modesta
- Psecadia pusiella
- Psecadia bipunctella
- Recurvaria nanella
- Nothris verbascella
- Anarsia lineatella
- Gelechia pistaciae
- Gelechia astragali
- Syncopacma polychromella
- Telphusa pistaciae
- Cecidophaga sinaica
- Vladimirea zygophyllivorella
- Pectinophora gossypiella
- Pectinophora malvella
- Recurvaria pistaciicola
- Phtorimaea operculella
- Sitotroga cerealella
- Ornativalva antipyramis

== Yponomeutidae ==
- Yponomeuta malinellus
- Yponomeuta padellus
- Yponomeuta rorellus

== Ypsolophidae ==
- Ypsolopha seniculella
- Ypsolopha ephedrella
- Ypsolopha sculpturella

== Plutellidae ==
- Plutella xylostella

== Glyphipterygidae ==
- Simaethis nemorana
- Anthophila pariana

== Heliodinidae ==
- Heliodines roesella

== Lyonetiidae ==
- Leucoptera malifoliella
- Lyonetia clerkella

== Bucculatricidae ==
- Bucculatrix endospiralis
- Bucculatrix iranica
- Bucculatrix pectinella
- Bucculatrix ulmella
- Bucculatrix ulmifoliae

== Psychidae ==
- Oiketicus quadrangularis
- Apterona crenulellu
- Apterona helix
- Amictoides shahkuhensis
- Amicta villosa
- Urobarba longicauda
- Melasina aequalis

== Tineidae ==
- Euplocamus bienerti
- Euplocamus schaeferi
- Morophagoides iranensis
- Nemapogon granellus
- Nemapogon signatellus
- Nemapogon orientalis
- Neurothaumasia inornata
- Neurothaumasia fasciata
- Obesoceras holtzi
- Infurcitinea amseli
- Infurcitinea fasciella
- Infurcitinea obscuroides
- Infurcitinea teheranensis
- Infurcitinea iranensis
- Infurcitinea megalopterella
- Infurcitinea brunneopterella
- Rhodobates pallipalpellus
- Pachyarthra brandti
- Pachyarthra grisea
- Pachyarthra iranica
- Myrmecozela lutosella gigantea
- Myrmecozela lutosella centrogramma
- Epsicardia caerulipennis
- Epsicardia xerexes
- Perissomastix flava
- Perissomastix cornuta
- Perissomastix wiltshirella
- Perissomastix peterseni
- Perissomastix palaestinella
- Ateliotum petrinellum orientale
- Ateliotum arabicum
- Ateliotum syriacum
- Ateliotum confusum
- Cephimallota praetoriella
- Ceratuncus affinitellus
- Fermocelina iranica
- Trichophaga abruptella
- Trichophaga tapetzella
- Tinea translucens
- Tinea basifasciella
- Tinea rostrata
- Tinea nonimella
- Tineola casandella
- Tineola bisselliella
- Tineola pellionella
- Niditinea tugurialis
- Niditinea piercella
- Euplocamus bienerti
- Niditinea fuscella
- Proterospastis trimaculata
- Ceratobia irakella
- Hapsifera luridella
- Eudorea mercurella
- Haplotinea ditella
- Haspifera asiatica

== Gracillariidae ==
- Acrocercops iraniana Triberti, 1990
- Aspilapteryx magna Triberti, 1985
- Aspilapteryx tringipennella (Zeller, 1839)
- Caloptilia roscipennella (Hübner, 1796)
- Calybites phasianipennella (Hübner, [1813])
- Cupedia cupediella (Herrich-Schäffer, 1855)
- Parornix persicella Danilevsky, 1955
- Phyllocnistis citrella Stainton, 1856
- Phyllonorycter blancardella (Fabricius, 1781)
- Phyllonorycter corylifoliella (Hübner, 1796)
- Phyllonorycter iranica Deschka, 1979
- Phyllonorycter platani (Staudinger, 1870)
- Phyllonorycter turanica (Gerasimov, 1931)
- Polymitia eximipalpella (Gerasimov, 1930)
- Polymitia laristana Triberti, 1986

== Tischeriidae ==
- Tischeria marginea

== Heliozelidae ==
- Holocacista rivillei

== Adelidae ==
- Nematopogon swammerdamellus
- Adela croesella
- Adela cuprella

== Nepticulidae ==
- Simplimorpha promissa

== Hepialidae ==
- Hepialus humuli

== Alucitidae ==
- Alucita cymatodactyla
- Alucita iranensis
- Alucita palodactyla
- Alucita pseudohuebneri

== Autostichidae ==
- Apiletria purulentella
- Heringita amseli
- Mylothra forsteri
- Mylothra mithra
- Oegoconia quadripuncta
- Symmoca costobscurella
- Turatia iranica

== Batrachedridae ==
- Batrachedra amydraula

== Crambidae ==
- Aeschremon disparalis
- Agriphila bleszynskiella
- Agriphila cyrenaicellus
- Agriphila microselasella
- Agriphila tersellus
- Agrotera nemoralis
- Amselia heringi
- Anania rudalis
- Anania verbascalis
- Anarpia incertalis
- Ancylolomia bitubirosella
- Ancylolomia disparalis
- Ancylolomia micropalpella
- Ancylolomia palpella
- Ancylolomia pectinatella
- Ancylolomia pectinatellus
- Ancylolomia westwoodi
- Aporodes floralis
- Apyrausta persicalis
- Asaluria reisseri
- Botys dulcinalis
- Botys tesserulalis
- Calamotropha paludella
- Calaniochrous acutellus
- Catoptria emiliae
- Catoptria incertellus
- Catoptria kasyi
- Catoptria pfeifferi
- Catoptria siliciellus
- Chilo luteellus
- Chilo phragmitella
- Chilo suppressalis
- Chiloides hederalis
- Chrysocrambus linetella

== See also ==
- List of butterflies of Iran
