= Euchromius pulverosa =

Scientific classification
- Kingdom: Animalia
- Phylum: Arthropoda
- Clade: Pancrustacea
- Class: Insecta
- Order: Lepidoptera
- Family: Crambidae
- Subfamily: Crambinae
- Tribe: Euchromiusini
- Genus: Euchromius
- Species: E. pulverosa

Binomial name
- Euchromius pulverosa (Christoph in Romanoff, 1887)

Synonyms
- Eromene pulverosa Christoph in Romanoff, 1887; Eromene cochlearella Amsel, 1949

Species of moth

Euchromius pulverosa is a moth in the family Crambidae. It was described by Hugo Theodor Christoph in 1887. It is found in Azerbaijan, Transcaucasia, Israel, Syria, Iraq, Iran and Kurdistan.
