= Chelis reticulata =

Scientific classification
- Domain: Eukaryota
- Kingdom: Animalia
- Phylum: Arthropoda
- Class: Insecta
- Order: Lepidoptera
- Superfamily: Noctuoidea
- Family: Erebidae
- Subfamily: Arctiinae
- Genus: Chelis
- Species: C. reticulata

Binomial name
- Chelis reticulata (Christoph, 1887)

Synonyms
- Arctia maculosa var. reticulata Christoph, 1887

Species of moth

Chelis reticulata is a moth in the family Erebidae. It was described by Hugo Theodor Christoph in 1887. It is found in the Caucasus, Transcaucasia, Armenia, the Kopet Dagh, Asia Minor, Syria, northern Lebanon and northern Iran.

== Subspecies ==
- Chelis reticulata reticulata (Kopet Dagh)
- Chelis reticulata schwingenschussi Daniel, 1933 (Lebanon)
- Chelis reticulata sultana Schwingenschuss, 1938 (Turkey)
- Chelis reticulata transcaucasica Dubatolov, 1988 (Armenia, Caucasus, Transcaucasia)
