= Eupithecia mirificata =

Scientific classification
- Domain: Eukaryota
- Kingdom: Animalia
- Phylum: Arthropoda
- Class: Insecta
- Order: Lepidoptera
- Family: Geometridae
- Genus: Eupithecia
- Species: E. mirificata

Binomial name
- Eupithecia mirificata Brandt, 1938

Synonyms
- Eupithecia linariatoides Mironov, 1989

Species of moth

Eupithecia mirificata is a moth in the family Geometridae. It is found in Afghanistan, Tajikistan and Iran.
