= Coleophora kandevanella =

Scientific classification
- Kingdom: Animalia
- Phylum: Arthropoda
- Class: Insecta
- Order: Lepidoptera
- Family: Coleophoridae
- Genus: Coleophora
- Species: C. kandevanella

Binomial name
- Coleophora kandevanella Toll, 1952

Species of moth

Coleophora kandevanella is a moth of the family Coleophoridae. It is found in Iran.
