= Ethmia cirrhocnemia =

Scientific classification
- Domain: Eukaryota
- Kingdom: Animalia
- Phylum: Arthropoda
- Class: Insecta
- Order: Lepidoptera
- Family: Depressariidae
- Genus: Ethmia
- Species: E. cirrhocnemia

Binomial name
- Ethmia cirrhocnemia (Lederer, 1870)

Synonyms
- Anesychia cirrhocnemia Lederer, 1870

Species of moth

Ethmia cirrhocnemia is a moth in the family Depressariidae. It is found in the southern Ural, the Caucasus, Iran, Turkestan, southern Yenisei, Irkutsk, Mongolia, Transbaikal, China (Mien-shan) and Korea.

The length of the forewings is about 10.5 mm (0.41 in). Adults have been recorded from mid-May to late July.
