= Scopula chalcographata =

Scientific classification
- Domain: Eukaryota
- Kingdom: Animalia
- Phylum: Arthropoda
- Class: Insecta
- Order: Lepidoptera
- Family: Geometridae
- Genus: Scopula
- Species: S. chalcographata

Binomial name
- Scopula chalcographata (Brandt, 1938)

Synonyms
- Glossotrophia chalcographata Brandt, 1938

Species of geometer moth in subfamily Sterrhinae

Scopula chalcographata is a moth of the family Geometridae. It is found in Egypt, the United Arab Emirates, Oman, Iran and Israel.

== Subspecies ==
- Scopula chalcographata chalcographata
- Scopula chalcographata sinaica (Rebel, 1948)
