= Eupithecia terrenata =

Scientific classification
- Domain: Eukaryota
- Kingdom: Animalia
- Phylum: Arthropoda
- Class: Insecta
- Order: Lepidoptera
- Family: Geometridae
- Genus: Eupithecia
- Species: E. terrenata

Binomial name
- Eupithecia terrenata Dietze, 1903

Species of moth

Eupithecia terrenata is a moth in the family Geometridae. It is found in Turkmenistan and Turkey.
