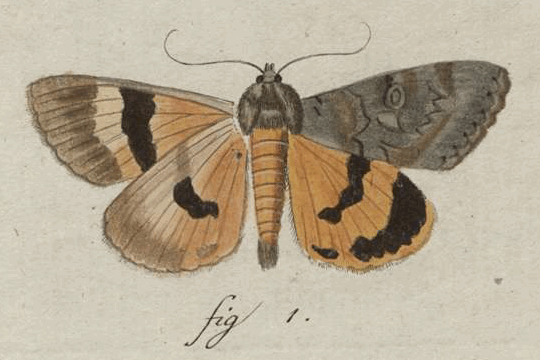

Scientific classification
- Kingdom: Animalia
- Phylum: Arthropoda
- Class: Insecta
- Order: Lepidoptera
- Superfamily: Noctuoidea
- Family: Erebidae
- Genus: Catocala
- Species: C. neonympha

Binomial name
- Catocala neonympha Butler, 1877

Synonyms
- Phalaena neonympha Esper, 1805; Mormonia neonympha variegata Warren, 1913; Mormonia neonympha syriaca Osthelder, 1933

= Catocala neonympha =

Species of moth

Catocala neonympha is a moth in the family Erebidae first described by Arthur Gardiner Butler in 1877. It is found in south-western Russia, Ukraine, Kazakhstan, eastern Turkey, Iraq, Armenia, Kurdistan, Afghanistan, the Altai Mountains and southern Siberia.

Adults have been recorded on wing in August.

The larvae feed on Glycyrrhiza glabra (licorice) and possibly Quercus (oak) species. Larvae can be found from May to July.

== Subspecies ==
- Catocala neonympha neonympha
- Catocala neonympha osthelderensis Hacker, 1990
- Catocala neonympha variegata (Warren, 1913)
