= Eupithecia aradjouna =

Scientific classification
- Kingdom: Animalia
- Phylum: Arthropoda
- Clade: Pancrustacea
- Class: Insecta
- Order: Lepidoptera
- Family: Geometridae
- Genus: Eupithecia
- Species: E. aradjouna

Binomial name
- Eupithecia aradjouna Brandt, 1938

Species of moth

Eupithecia aradjouna is a moth in the family Geometridae. It is found in Iran.

== Taxonomy ==
Subspecies Eupithecia aradjouna taftanica is now considered a synonym of Eupithecia frontosa.
