= Coleophora niveopictella =

Scientific classification
- Kingdom: Animalia
- Phylum: Arthropoda
- Class: Insecta
- Order: Lepidoptera
- Family: Coleophoridae
- Genus: Coleophora
- Species: C. niveopictella

Binomial name
- Coleophora niveopictella Toll, 1952

Species of moth

Coleophora niveopictella is a moth of the family Coleophoridae. It is found in Iran.
