= Coleophora bivittella =

Scientific classification
- Kingdom: Animalia
- Phylum: Arthropoda
- Class: Insecta
- Order: Lepidoptera
- Family: Coleophoridae
- Genus: Coleophora
- Species: C. bivittella

Binomial name
- Coleophora bivittella Staudinger, 1879

Synonyms
- Coleophora griseicornella Toll, 1959

Species of moth

Coleophora bivittella is a moth of the family Coleophoridae. It is found in Asia Minor and Iran.
