= Cossulus lignosus =

Scientific classification
- Domain: Eukaryota
- Kingdom: Animalia
- Phylum: Arthropoda
- Class: Insecta
- Order: Lepidoptera
- Family: Cossidae
- Genus: Cossulus
- Species: C. lignosus

Binomial name
- Cossulus lignosus (Brandt, 1938)

Synonyms
- Hypopta lignosus Brandt, 1938; Cossulus lignosa

Species of moth

Cossulus lignosus is a moth in the family Cossidae. It is found in Turkey, Syria, Lebanon and Iran.

== Subspecies ==
- Cossulus lignosus lignosus (Syria, Lebanon, Iran)
- Cossulus lignosus solgunus de Freina, 1983 (Turkey)
