= Catocala fredi =

Scientific classification
- Kingdom: Animalia
- Phylum: Arthropoda
- Class: Insecta
- Order: Lepidoptera
- Superfamily: Noctuoidea
- Family: Erebidae
- Genus: Catocala
- Species: C. fredi

Binomial name
- Catocala fredi Bytinsky-Salz & Brandt, 1937

Species of moth

Catocala fredi is a moth in the family Erebidae first described by Hans Bytinsky-Salz and Wilhelm Brandt in 1937. It is found in Iran.
