= Coleophora magnatella =

Scientific classification
- Kingdom: Animalia
- Phylum: Arthropoda
- Class: Insecta
- Order: Lepidoptera
- Family: Coleophoridae
- Genus: Coleophora
- Species: C. magnatella

Binomial name
- Coleophora magnatella Toll, 1959

Synonyms
- Coleophora magnatella Toll & Amsel, 1967 (Junior primary homonym of Coleophora magnatella Toll, 1959); Coleophora polichomriella Amsel, 1968 (Replacement name for Coleophora magnatella Toll & Amsel, 1967)

Species of moth

Coleophora magnatella is a moth of the family Coleophoridae. It is found in Afghanistan and Iran.

The larvae feed on Glycyrrhiza glabra and Meristotropis triphylla. They feed on the shoots of their host plant.
