= Eupithecia parallelaria =

Scientific classification
- Kingdom: Animalia
- Phylum: Arthropoda
- Class: Insecta
- Order: Lepidoptera
- Family: Geometridae
- Genus: Eupithecia
- Species: E. parallelaria

Binomial name
- Eupithecia parallelaria Bohatsch, 1893

Synonyms
- Eupithecia unedonata var. parallelaria Bohatsch, 1893

Species of moth

Eupithecia parallelaria is a moth in the family Geometridae. It is found in Turkmenistan, Iran, eastern Afghanistan and Kashmir.
