= Glossotrophia gracilis =

Scientific classification
- Kingdom: Animalia
- Phylum: Arthropoda
- Class: Insecta
- Order: Lepidoptera
- Family: Geometridae
- Genus: Glossotrophia
- Species: G. gracilis

Binomial name
- Glossotrophia gracilis Brandt, 1941

Species of moth

Glossotrophia gracilis is a moth of the family Geometridae. It is found in Iran, the United Arab Emirates and Oman.
