= Eupithecia ochrovittata =

Scientific classification
- Domain: Eukaryota
- Kingdom: Animalia
- Phylum: Arthropoda
- Class: Insecta
- Order: Lepidoptera
- Family: Geometridae
- Genus: Eupithecia
- Species: E. ochrovittata

Binomial name
- Eupithecia ochrovittata Christoph, 1887

Species of moth

Eupithecia ochrovittata is a moth in the family Geometridae. It is found in Afghanistan and the Transcaucasus (Georgia and Armenia).
