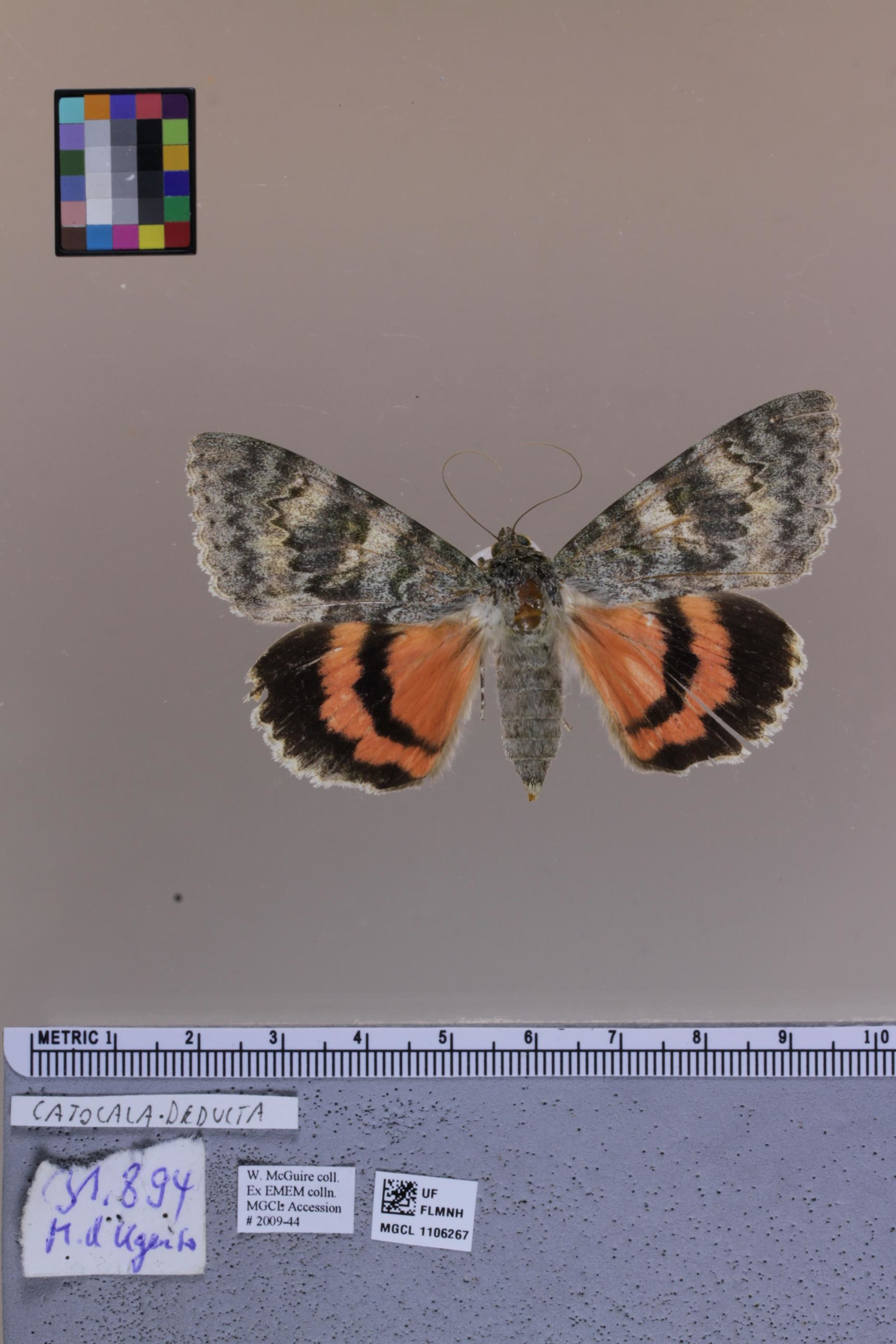

Scientific classification
- Kingdom: Animalia
- Phylum: Arthropoda
- Class: Insecta
- Order: Lepidoptera
- Superfamily: Noctuoidea
- Family: Erebidae
- Genus: Catocala
- Species: C. deducta

Binomial name
- Catocala deducta Eversmann, 1843

Synonyms
- Catocala uralensis Spuler, 1908

= Catocala deducta =

Species of moth

Catocala deducta is a moth in the family Erebidae first described by Eduard Friedrich Eversmann in 1843. It is found in Russia (Urals, Altai).

The larvae possibly feed on Salix and Populus species.
