= Scopula asiatica =

Scientific classification
- Domain: Eukaryota
- Kingdom: Animalia
- Phylum: Arthropoda
- Class: Insecta
- Order: Lepidoptera
- Family: Geometridae
- Genus: Scopula
- Species: S. asiatica

Binomial name
- Scopula asiatica (Brandt, 1938)

Synonyms
- Glossotrophia asiatica Brandt, 1938

Species of geometer moth in subfamily Sterrhinae

Scopula asiatica is a moth of the family Geometridae. It is found in Iran.
