= Scopula conscensa =

Scientific classification
- Domain: Eukaryota
- Kingdom: Animalia
- Phylum: Arthropoda
- Class: Insecta
- Order: Lepidoptera
- Family: Geometridae
- Genus: Scopula
- Species: S. conscensa

Binomial name
- Scopula conscensa (C. Swinhoe, 1886)

Synonyms
- Eupithecia conscensa C. Swinhoe, 1886; Zygophyxia conscensa

Species of geometer moth in subfamily Sterrhinae

Scopula conscensa is a moth of the family Geometridae. It was described by Charles Swinhoe in 1886. It is endemic to India.
