= Coleophora schahkuhensis =

Scientific classification
- Kingdom: Animalia
- Phylum: Arthropoda
- Class: Insecta
- Order: Lepidoptera
- Family: Coleophoridae
- Genus: Coleophora
- Species: C. schahkuhensis

Binomial name
- Coleophora schahkuhensis Toll, 1952

Species of moth

Coleophora schahkuhensis is a moth of the family Coleophoridae. It is found in Iran.
