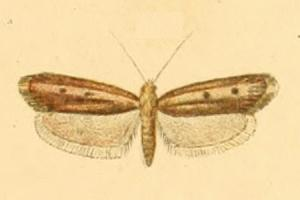

Scientific classification
- Kingdom: Animalia
- Phylum: Arthropoda
- Clade: Pancrustacea
- Class: Insecta
- Order: Lepidoptera
- Family: Depressariidae
- Genus: Ethmia
- Species: E. vittalbella

Binomial name
- Ethmia vittalbella (Christoph, 1877)

Synonyms
- Psecadia vittalbella Christoph, 1877; Psecadia radiatella Chrétien, 1907; Psecadia tripolitanella Turati, 1929; Psecadia vittalbata Mabille, 1906

= Ethmia vittalbella =

Species of moth

Ethmia vittalbella is a moth in the family Depressariidae. It is found on Morocco, Tunisia, Algeria, Libya, Egypt, Jordan, Arabia, Armenia, Turkmenistan, Uzbekistan, Kazakhstan, Iran, Iraq, Syria, Afghanistan, Pakistan, India and Russia.
