= Scopula semitata =

Scientific classification
- Domain: Eukaryota
- Kingdom: Animalia
- Phylum: Arthropoda
- Class: Insecta
- Order: Lepidoptera
- Family: Geometridae
- Genus: Scopula
- Species: S. semitata

Binomial name
- Scopula semitata (Prout, 1913)

Synonyms
- Glossotrophia semitata Prout, 1913; Glossotrophia ariana Ebert, 1965; Glossotrophia ghirshmani Wiltshire, 1966; Glossotrophia tangii Ebert, 1965; Glossotrophia taurica Wehrli, 1930

Species of geometer moth in subfamily Sterrhinae

Scopula semitata is a moth of the family Geometridae. It was described by Prout in 1913. It is found in the Levant.

== Subspecies ==
- Scopula semitata semitata
- Scopula semitata ariana (Ebert, 1965)
- Scopula semitata taurica (Wehrli, 1930)

== Taxonomy ==
The species is listed as a synonym or subspecies of S. sacraria by some authors.
