= Euchromius jaxartella =

Scientific classification
- Kingdom: Animalia
- Phylum: Arthropoda
- Clade: Pancrustacea
- Class: Insecta
- Order: Lepidoptera
- Family: Crambidae
- Subfamily: Crambinae
- Tribe: Euchromiusini
- Genus: Euchromius
- Species: E. jaxartella

Binomial name
- Euchromius jaxartella (Erschoff, 1874)

Synonyms
- Eromene jaxartella Erschoff, 1874

Species of moth

Euchromius jaxartella is a moth in the family Crambidae. It was described by Nikolay Grigoryevich Erschoff in 1874. It is found in Transcaucasia, Iran, Tadzhikistan, Kyrgyzstan, Kazakhstan, Afghanistan, Pakistan, Turkmenistan and Mongolia.
