= Eupithecia exactata =

Scientific classification
- Domain: Eukaryota
- Kingdom: Animalia
- Phylum: Arthropoda
- Class: Insecta
- Order: Lepidoptera
- Family: Geometridae
- Genus: Eupithecia
- Species: E. exactata

Binomial name
- Eupithecia exactata Staudinger, 1882

Synonyms
- Eupithecia exactata f. modesta Dietze, 1910; Eupithecia procera Vojnits, 1982; Eupithecia opulenta Vojnits, 1982; Eupithecia subolivacea Inoue, 1996

Species of moth

Eupithecia exactata is a moth in the family Geometridae. It is found in Afghanistan, northern Iran (Shahkuh Mountains), Kyrgyzstan, Tajikistan, Jammu & Kashmir, south-eastern Kazakhstan, north-western China (Xinjiang) and Mongolia. The habitat consists of mountainous areas.
