= Ethmia lecmima =

Scientific classification
- Kingdom: Animalia
- Phylum: Arthropoda
- Class: Insecta
- Order: Lepidoptera
- Family: Depressariidae
- Genus: Ethmia
- Species: E. lecmima

Binomial name
- Ethmia lecmima Sattler, 1967

Species of moth

Ethmia lecmima is a moth in the family Depressariidae. It is found in Afghanistan, Iran, Pakistan and the United Arab Emirates.

== Subspecies ==
- Ethmia lecmima lecmima
- Ethmia lecmima amsel Kemal & Kocak, 2005
