= Ethmia amasina =

Scientific classification
- Domain: Eukaryota
- Kingdom: Animalia
- Phylum: Arthropoda
- Class: Insecta
- Order: Lepidoptera
- Family: Depressariidae
- Genus: Ethmia
- Species: E. amasina

Binomial name
- Ethmia amasina (Staudinger, 1880)

Synonyms
- Psecadia amasina Staudinger, 1880

Species of moth

Ethmia amasina is a moth in the family Depressariidae. It was described by Otto Staudinger in 1880. It is found in Asia Minor (Amasia), Syria, Iraq (Kurdistan) and Iran.

The wingspan is 20–24 mm (0.79–0.94 in). The forewings are white with three black dots on the wing, two on the fold and one after the cell. There is also a row of eight to eleven marginal points. The hindwings are dull grey.
