= Coleophora abbasella =

Scientific classification
- Kingdom: Animalia
- Phylum: Arthropoda
- Clade: Pancrustacea
- Class: Insecta
- Order: Lepidoptera
- Family: Coleophoridae
- Genus: Coleophora
- Species: C. abbasella

Binomial name
- Coleophora abbasella Baldizzone, 1994

Species of moth

Coleophora abbasella is a species of moth in the family Coleophoridae found in Iran and Pakistan.
