= Coleophora gymnocarpella =

Scientific classification
- Kingdom: Animalia
- Phylum: Arthropoda
- Class: Insecta
- Order: Lepidoptera
- Family: Coleophoridae
- Genus: Coleophora
- Species: C. gymnocarpella

Binomial name
- Coleophora gymnocarpella Walsingham, 1907

Species of moth

Coleophora gymnocarpella is a moth of the family Coleophoridae. It is found in Morocco, Algeria, Tunisia, Iran and the United Arab Emirates.

The larvae feed on the leaves of Gymnocarpon fruticosum.
