= Coleophora botaurella =

Scientific classification
- Kingdom: Animalia
- Phylum: Arthropoda
- Class: Insecta
- Order: Lepidoptera
- Family: Coleophoridae
- Genus: Coleophora
- Species: C. botaurella

Binomial name
- Coleophora botaurella Herrich-Schäffer, 1861

Species of moth

Coleophora botaurella is a moth of the family Coleophoridae. It is found in Russia (Volga region), Kazakhstan, Turkmenistan, Iran, Afghanistan and Turkey.

Adults are on wing from June to August.
