= Ethmia alba =

Scientific classification
- Kingdom: Animalia
- Phylum: Arthropoda
- Class: Insecta
- Order: Lepidoptera
- Family: Depressariidae
- Genus: Ethmia
- Species: E. alba

Binomial name
- Ethmia alba (Amsel, 1949)

Synonyms
- Wiltshireia alba Amsel, 1949

Species of moth

Ethmia alba is a moth in the family Depressariidae. It is found in Egypt, Iran and the United Arab Emirates.

The wingspan is 10–12 mm (0.39–0.47 in).
