= Coleophora longiductella =

Scientific classification
- Kingdom: Animalia
- Phylum: Arthropoda
- Clade: Pancrustacea
- Class: Insecta
- Order: Lepidoptera
- Family: Coleophoridae
- Genus: Coleophora
- Species: C. longiductella

Binomial name
- Coleophora longiductella Baldizzone, 1989

Species of moth

Coleophora longiductella is a moth of the family Coleophoridae. It is found in Iran, Pakistan and Yemen.
