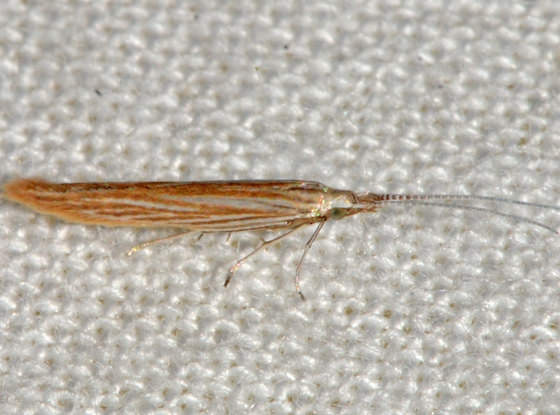

Scientific classification
- Kingdom: Animalia
- Phylum: Arthropoda
- Clade: Pancrustacea
- Class: Insecta
- Order: Lepidoptera
- Family: Coleophoridae
- Genus: Coleophora
- Species: C. cratipennella

Binomial name
- Coleophora cratipennella Clemens, 1864

Synonyms
- Coleophora gigantella Chambers, 1874; Coleophora shaleriella Chambers, 1875

= Coleophora cratipennella =

Species of moth

Coleophora cratipennella, the streaked coleophora moth, is a moth of the family Coleophoridae. It is found in the United States, including Kentucky, Pennsylvania, California, Maine and Oklahoma.

The wingspan is about 12 mm.

The larvae feed on the seeds of Juncus gerardii. They create a trivalved, tubular silken case.
