= Eupithecia sincera =

Scientific classification
- Domain: Eukaryota
- Kingdom: Animalia
- Phylum: Arthropoda
- Class: Insecta
- Order: Lepidoptera
- Family: Geometridae
- Genus: Eupithecia
- Species: E. sincera

Binomial name
- Eupithecia sincera Brandt, 1938

Species of moth

Eupithecia sincera is a moth in the family Geometridae. It is found in Iran.
