= Coleophora arachnias =

Scientific classification
- Kingdom: Animalia
- Phylum: Arthropoda
- Class: Insecta
- Order: Lepidoptera
- Family: Coleophoridae
- Genus: Coleophora
- Species: C. arachnias

Binomial name
- Coleophora arachnias Meyrick, 1922

Synonyms
- Coleophora hederella Toll, 1942; Coleophora shadeganensis Toll, 1959

Species of moth

Coleophora arachnias is a moth of the family Coleophoridae. It is found in Iran, Afghanistan, Iran, Turkmenistan, Saudi Arabia, the Palestinian Territories and Oman.
