= Euxoa heringi =

Scientific classification
- Domain: Eukaryota
- Kingdom: Animalia
- Phylum: Arthropoda
- Class: Insecta
- Order: Lepidoptera
- Superfamily: Noctuoidea
- Family: Noctuidae
- Genus: Euxoa
- Species: E. heringi

Binomial name
- Euxoa heringi (Staudinger, 1877)

Synonyms
- Agrotis heringi Staudinger, 1877

Species of moth

Euxoa heringi is a moth of the family Noctuidae. It is found in Turkey, Israel and central Asia.

Adults are on wing in August to October. There is one generation per year.
