= Phyllonorycter iranica =

Scientific classification
- Kingdom: Animalia
- Phylum: Arthropoda
- Class: Insecta
- Order: Lepidoptera
- Family: Gracillariidae
- Genus: Phyllonorycter
- Species: P. iranica

Binomial name
- Phyllonorycter iranica Deschka, 1979

Species of moth

Phyllonorycter iranica is a moth of the family Gracillariidae. It is known from Iran.

The length of the forewings is about 4 mm.

The larvae feed on Malus domestica. They mine the leaves of their host plant. The mine has the form of a very small mine on the underside of the leaf.
