= Symmoca costobscurella =

Scientific classification
- Kingdom: Animalia
- Phylum: Arthropoda
- Clade: Pancrustacea
- Class: Insecta
- Order: Lepidoptera
- Family: Autostichidae
- Genus: Symmoca
- Species: S. costobscurella

Binomial name
- Symmoca costobscurella Amsel, 1949

Species of moth

Symmoca costobscurella is a moth in the family Autostichidae. It was described by Hans Georg Amsel in 1949. It is found in Iran.
