= Eupithecia lithographata =

Scientific classification
- Domain: Eukaryota
- Kingdom: Animalia
- Phylum: Arthropoda
- Class: Insecta
- Order: Lepidoptera
- Family: Geometridae
- Genus: Eupithecia
- Species: E. lithographata

Binomial name
- Eupithecia lithographata Christoph, 1887

Synonyms
- Eupithecia litographata Petersen, 1910

Species of moth

Eupithecia lithographata is a moth in the family Geometridae. It is found in Iran.
