= Hyrcanypena =

Scientific classification
- Domain: Eukaryota
- Kingdom: Animalia
- Phylum: Arthropoda
- Class: Insecta
- Order: Lepidoptera
- Superfamily: Noctuoidea
- Family: Erebidae
- Subfamily: Hypeninae
- Genus: Hyrcanypena; Wagner, 1937
- Species: H. schwingenschussi

Binomial name
- Hyrcanypena schwingenschussi Wagner, 1937

Synonyms
- Zanclostathme Draudt, 1937; Zanclostathme elbursalis Draudt, 1937

Genus of moth

Hyrcanypena is a monotypic genus of moths of the family Noctuidae containing the single species Hyrcanypena schwingenschussi. It was described by Wagner in 1937. It is found in Iran.
