= Azygophleps regia =

Scientific classification
- Domain: Eukaryota
- Kingdom: Animalia
- Phylum: Arthropoda
- Class: Insecta
- Order: Lepidoptera
- Family: Cossidae
- Genus: Azygophleps
- Species: A. regia

Binomial name
- Azygophleps regia (Staudinger, 1891)

Synonyms
- Zeuzera regia Staudinger, 1891; Zeuzera regina Wiltshire, 1957

Species of moth

Azygophleps regia is a moth in the family Cossidae found in Turkey, Pakistan, Iran and Iraq.
