= Hypotia lobalis =

Scientific classification
- Kingdom: Animalia
- Phylum: Arthropoda
- Clade: Pancrustacea
- Class: Insecta
- Order: Lepidoptera
- Family: Pyralidae
- Genus: Hypotia
- Species: H. lobalis

Binomial name
- Hypotia lobalis (Chrétien, 1915)

Synonyms
- Constantia lobalis Chrétien, 1915; Dattinia conformalis Amsel, 1949; Dattinia fredi Amsel, 1949

Species of moth

Hypotia lobalis is a species of snout moth in the genus Hypotia. It was described by Pierre Chrétien in 1915 and is known from Algeria and Iran.
