= Ethmia caradjae =

Scientific classification
- Domain: Eukaryota
- Kingdom: Animalia
- Phylum: Arthropoda
- Class: Insecta
- Order: Lepidoptera
- Family: Depressariidae
- Genus: Ethmia
- Species: E. caradjae

Binomial name
- Ethmia caradjae (Rebel, 1907)

Synonyms
- Psecadia caradjae Rebel, 1907; Ethmia chosroes Wiltshire, 1947

Species of moth

Ethmia caradjae is a moth in the family Depressariidae. It was described by Hans Rebel in 1907. It is found in Asia Minor (Taurus Mountains), Iraq, Kurdistan and south-western Iran.

The wingspan is about 24 mm (0.94 in).
