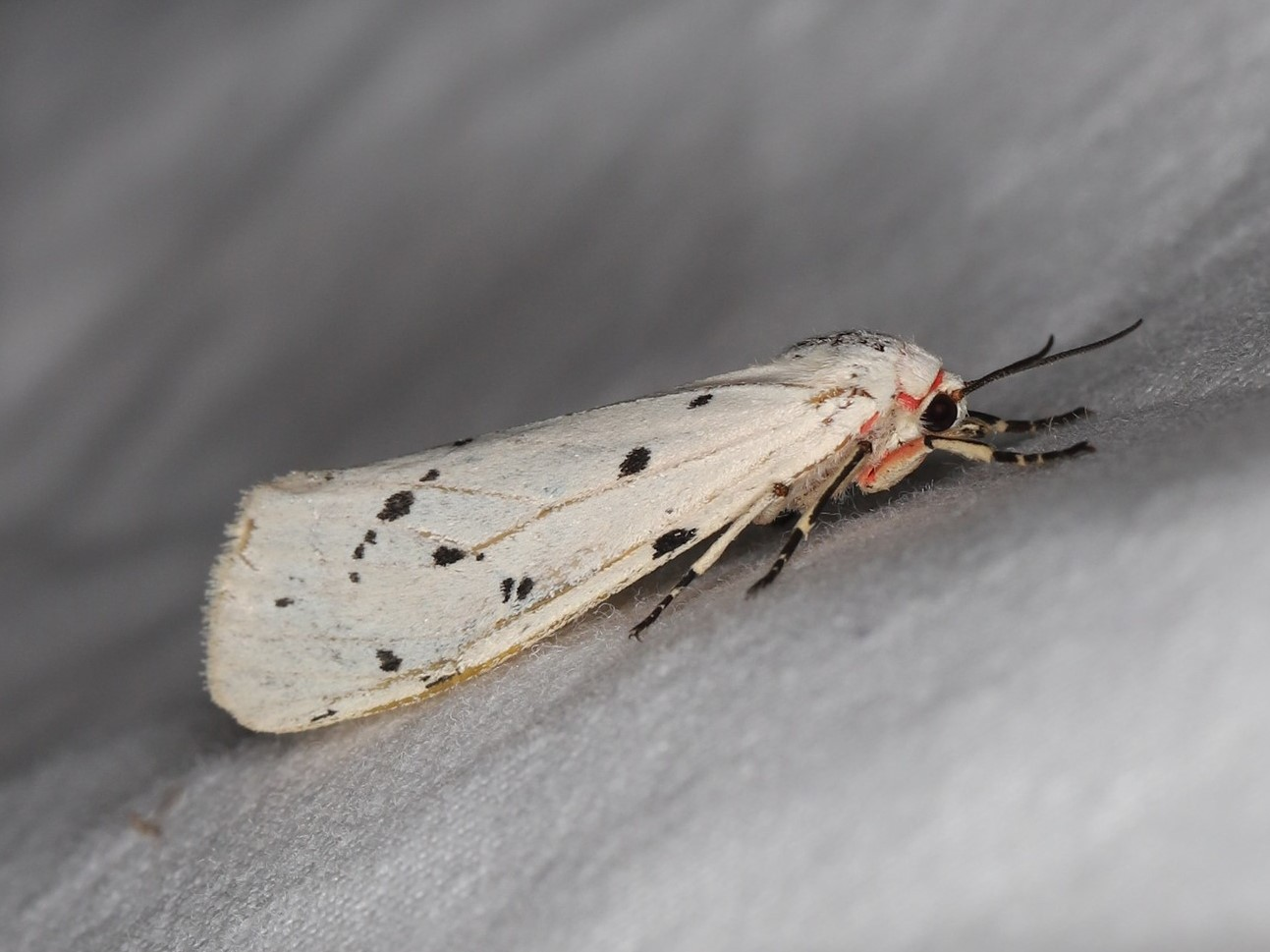

Scientific classification
- Domain: Eukaryota
- Kingdom: Animalia
- Phylum: Arthropoda
- Class: Insecta
- Order: Lepidoptera
- Superfamily: Noctuoidea
- Family: Erebidae
- Subfamily: Arctiinae
- Genus: Creataloum; Dubatolov, 2004
- Species: C. arabicum

Binomial name
- Creataloum arabicum (Hampson, 1896)

Synonyms
- List: Spilosoma arabicum Hampson, 1896; Creatonotos arabica; Spilosoma gracilis Staudinger, 1900; Creatonotos aula Boisduval; Creatonotos arabica ab. pedunculata Strand, 1919

= Creataloum =

Genus of moths

Creataloum is a genus of tiger moths in the family Erebidae erected by Vladimir Dubatolov in 2004. It is monotypic, being represented by the single species Creataloum arabicum, which was first described by George Hampson in 1896. It is found in the Near East, or more specifically in Jordan, Palestine, Arabia, southern Iraq, southern Iran, and possibly in Egypt and southern Pakistan.
