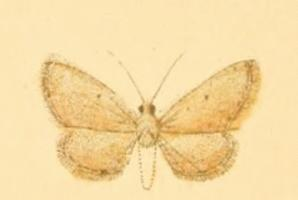

Scientific classification
- Domain: Eukaryota
- Kingdom: Animalia
- Phylum: Arthropoda
- Class: Insecta
- Order: Lepidoptera
- Family: Geometridae
- Genus: Eupithecia
- Species: E. sutiliata

Binomial name
- Eupithecia sutiliata Christoph, 1876

Synonyms
- Eupithecia aequata Staudinger, 1892; Eupithecia diffisata Dietze, 1903; Eupithecia kasahstanica Viidalepp 1988; Tephroclystia orientata Staudinger, 1901; Eupithecia rjabovi Vojnits, 1975

= Eupithecia sutiliata =

Species of moth

Eupithecia sutiliata is a moth in the family Geometridae. It is found in south-eastern Russia and Mount Chelmos in Greece. It is also found in Iran.
