= Scopula origalis =

Scientific classification
- Domain: Eukaryota
- Kingdom: Animalia
- Phylum: Arthropoda
- Class: Insecta
- Order: Lepidoptera
- Family: Geometridae
- Genus: Scopula
- Species: S. origalis

Binomial name
- Scopula origalis (Brandt, 1941)

Synonyms
- Glossotrophia origalis Brandt, 1941

Species of geometer moth in subfamily Sterrhinae

Scopula origalis (or Scopula danieli) is a moth of the family Geometridae. It is found in Iran (Laristan).

The wingspan is 18–18.5 millimetres (0.71–0.73 in). Adults have been recorded on wing in mid of November.

== Subspecies ==
- Scopula origalis origalis
- Scopula origalis danieli (Wiltshire, 1966)
- Scopula origalis safida (Wiltshire, 1966)
- Scopula origalis vantshica (Viidalepp, 1988)
