= Eupithecia harenosa =

Scientific classification
- Kingdom: Animalia
- Phylum: Arthropoda
- Clade: Pancrustacea
- Class: Insecta
- Order: Lepidoptera
- Family: Geometridae
- Genus: Eupithecia
- Species: E. harenosa

Binomial name
- Eupithecia harenosa Brandt, 1938

Species of moth

Eupithecia harenosa is a moth in the family Geometridae. It is found in Iran.
