= Eupithecia kopetdaghica =

Scientific classification
- Kingdom: Animalia
- Phylum: Arthropoda
- Clade: Pancrustacea
- Class: Insecta
- Order: Lepidoptera
- Family: Geometridae
- Genus: Eupithecia
- Species: E. kopetdaghica

Binomial name
- Eupithecia kopetdaghica Mironov, 1989

Species of moth

Eupithecia kopetdaghica is a moth in the family Geometridae. It is found in Turkmenistan.
