= Eupithecia relaxata =

Scientific classification
- Domain: Eukaryota
- Kingdom: Animalia
- Phylum: Arthropoda
- Class: Insecta
- Order: Lepidoptera
- Family: Geometridae
- Genus: Eupithecia
- Species: E. relaxata

Binomial name
- Eupithecia relaxata Dietze, 1904

Synonyms
- Eupithecia unedonata var. relaxata Dietze, 1904; Eupithecia costisignata Dietze, 1904; Eupithecia pamiri Vojnits, 1988; Eupithecia vicariata Dietze, 1903; Eupithecia adjunctata Dietze, 1904

Species of moth

Eupithecia relaxata is a moth in the family Geometridae. It is found in Afghanistan, Turkmenistan (the Kopet Dag mountains), Iran, Tajikistan (the Pamir Mountains), Kazakhstan, Kyrgyzstan (the Tian Shan mountains), Pakistan (Baltistan), Jammu & Kashmir, India (the Ladakh Range), northwestern China (Xinjiang) and Mongolia (the Mongol Altai Mountains).
