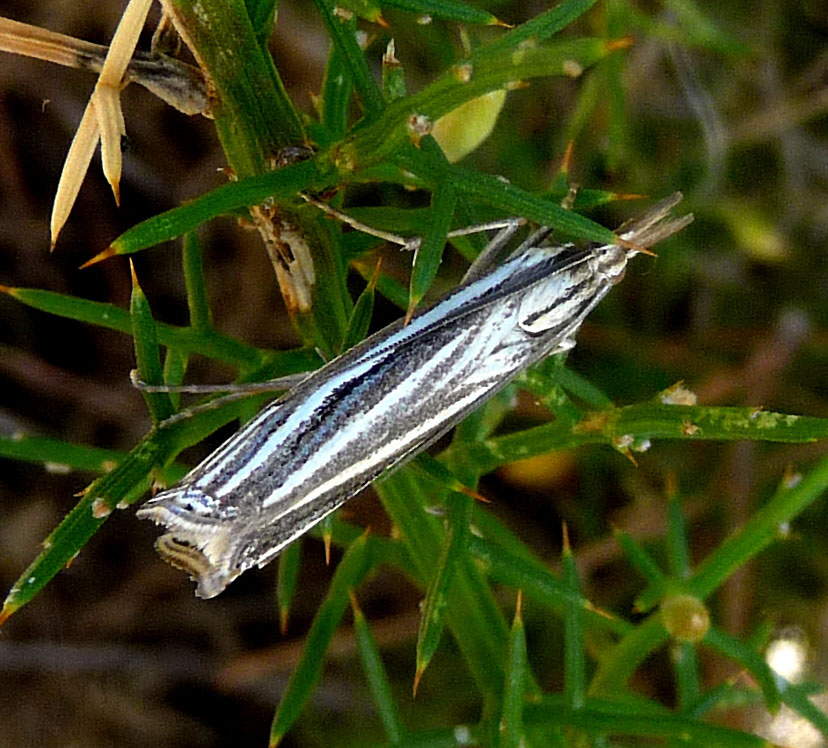

Scientific classification
- Kingdom: Animalia
- Phylum: Arthropoda
- Clade: Pancrustacea
- Class: Insecta
- Order: Lepidoptera
- Family: Crambidae
- Subfamily: Crambinae
- Tribe: Ancylolomiini
- Genus: Ancylolomia
- Species: A. disparalis

Binomial name
- Ancylolomia disparalis Hubner, 1825

Synonyms
- Ancylolomia griseella Amsel, 1951; Ancylolomia hipponella Ragonot in de Joannis & Ragonot, 1889; Ancylolomia rabatella D. Lucas, 1937; Chilo powelli D. Lucas, 1954; Crambus contritellus Zeller, 1847; Tinea disparella Hübner, 1813

= Ancylolomia disparalis =

Species of moth

Ancylolomia disparalis is a species of moth in the family Crambidae. It is found in France, Spain, Portugal, Italy, Greece, Turkey and North Africa (including Morocco and Algeria).

The wingspan is 27–43 mm. Adults are on wing from July to October in one generation per year.

The larvae feed on various grasses.
