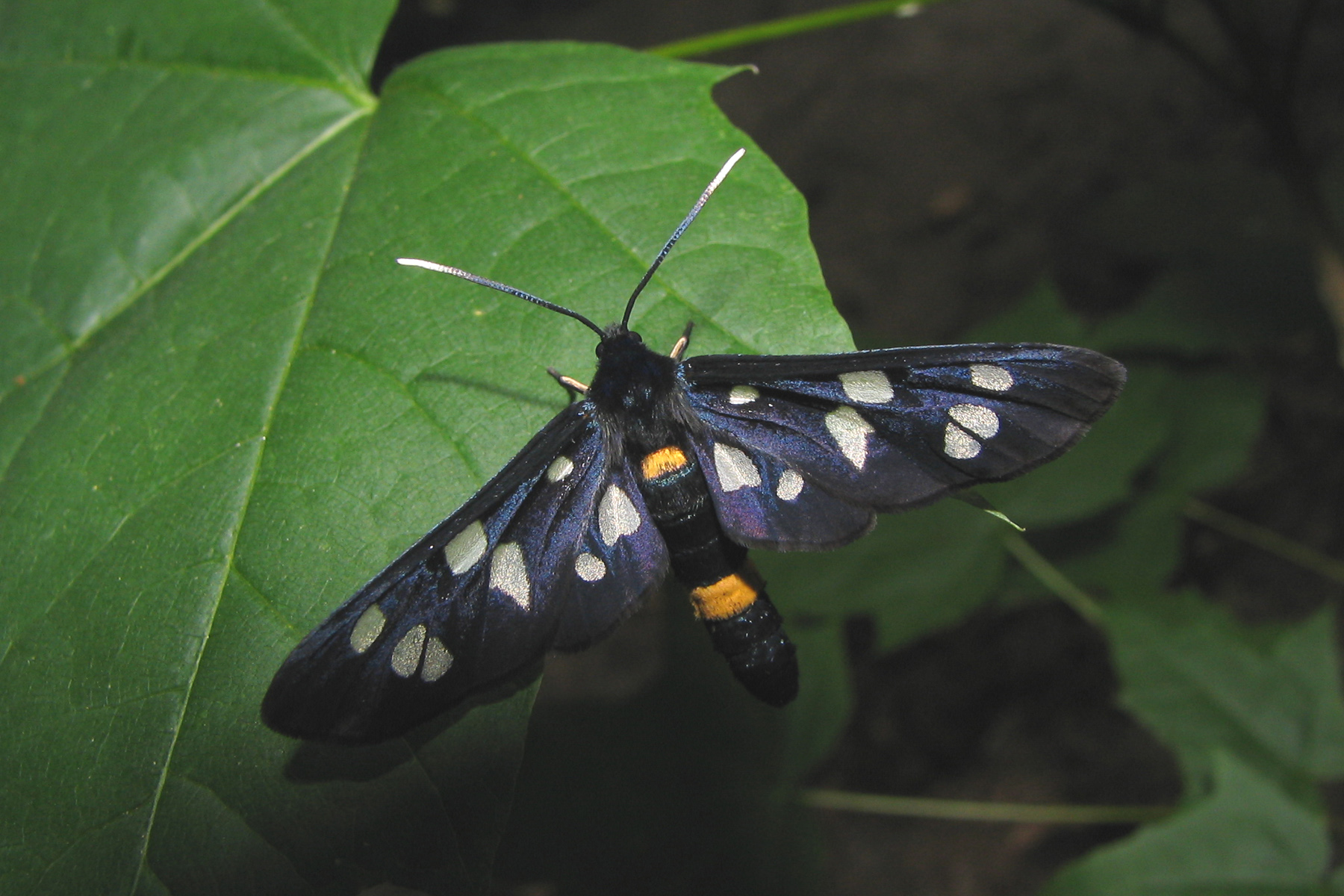

Scientific classification
- Domain: Eukaryota
- Kingdom: Animalia
- Phylum: Arthropoda
- Class: Insecta
- Order: Lepidoptera
- Superfamily: Noctuoidea
- Family: Erebidae
- Subfamily: Arctiinae
- Genus: Amata
- Species: A. nigricornis

Binomial name
- Amata nigricornis (Alphéraky, 1883)

Synonyms
- Syntomis nigricornis Turati, 1917; Syntomis phegea ab. nicricornis Alphéraky, 1883; Amata nigricornis nigricornis nat. montana Obraztsov, 1937; Amata (Syntomis) nigricornis tanaica Obraztsov, 1941; Amata (Syntomis) nigricornis jaica Obraztsov, 1941; Amata nigricornis nigricornis nat. borzhomica Obraztsov, 1966; Syntomis rossica Turati, 1917; Amata nigricornis nigricornis natio osthelderi Obraztsov, 1966

= Amata nigricornis =

Species of moth

Amata nigricornis is a species of moth of the family Erebidae first described by Sergei Alphéraky in 1883. It is common in Ukraine and found in the southern part of European Russia, the Transcaucasus, Turkey and Iran.

The wingspan is 30–35 mm.

== Subspecies ==
- Amata nigricornis nigricornis
- Amata nigricornis anatolica (Zerny, 1931)
- Amata nigricornis krymaea Obraztsov, 1937
- Amata nigricornis turgaica Obraztsov, 1937
