= Coleophora aervae =

Scientific classification
- Kingdom: Animalia
- Phylum: Arthropoda
- Clade: Pancrustacea
- Class: Insecta
- Order: Lepidoptera
- Family: Coleophoridae
- Genus: Coleophora
- Species: C. aervae

Binomial name
- Coleophora aervae Baldizzone, 1994

Species of moth

Coleophora aervae is a moth of the family Coleophoridae that is endemic to Iran.

The larvae feed on the leaves of Aerva persica.
