= Coleophora amasiella =

Scientific classification
- Kingdom: Animalia
- Phylum: Arthropoda
- Clade: Pancrustacea
- Class: Insecta
- Order: Lepidoptera
- Family: Coleophoridae
- Genus: Coleophora
- Species: C. amasiella

Binomial name
- Coleophora amasiella Stainton, 1867

Species of insect

Coleophora amasiella is a moth of the family Coleophoridae that can be found in Iran, Iraq, Jordan, Palestine, Syria, and Turkey.

The larvae feed on Alhagi pseudalhagi. They feed on the leaves of their host plant.
