= Coleophora adlecta =

Scientific classification
- Kingdom: Animalia
- Phylum: Arthropoda
- Clade: Pancrustacea
- Class: Insecta
- Order: Lepidoptera
- Family: Coleophoridae
- Genus: Coleophora
- Species: C. adlecta

Binomial name
- Coleophora adlecta Baldizzone, 1994

Species of moth

Coleophora adlecta is a moth of the family Coleophoridae that is endemic to Iran.
