= Eupithecia mesogrammata =

Scientific classification
- Domain: Eukaryota
- Kingdom: Animalia
- Phylum: Arthropoda
- Class: Insecta
- Order: Lepidoptera
- Family: Geometridae
- Genus: Eupithecia
- Species: E. mesogrammata

Binomial name
- Eupithecia mesogrammata Dietze, 1910

Synonyms
- Eupithecia kunzi Pinker, 1976

Species of moth

Eupithecia mesogrammata is a moth in the family Geometridae. It is found in Iran, Turkey and Georgia.
