= Scopula iranaria =

Scientific classification
- Domain: Eukaryota
- Kingdom: Animalia
- Phylum: Arthropoda
- Class: Insecta
- Order: Lepidoptera
- Family: Geometridae
- Genus: Scopula
- Species: S. iranaria

Binomial name
- Scopula iranaria Bytinski-Salz & Brandt, 1937

Species of geometer moth in subfamily Sterrhinae

Scopula iranaria is a moth of the family Geometridae. It is found in Iran.
