= Coleophora aequalella =

Scientific classification
- Kingdom: Animalia
- Phylum: Arthropoda
- Class: Insecta
- Order: Lepidoptera
- Family: Coleophoridae
- Genus: Coleophora
- Species: C. aequalella

Binomial name
- Coleophora aequalella Christoph, 1872

Synonyms
- Coleophora heratella Toll & Amsel 1967

Species of moth

Coleophora aequalella is a moth of the family Coleophoridae. It is found in southern Russia, Iran, Uzbekistan and Afghanistan.

Adults are on wing in May and June.
