= Coleophora lasiocharis =

Scientific classification
- Kingdom: Animalia
- Phylum: Arthropoda
- Class: Insecta
- Order: Lepidoptera
- Family: Coleophoridae
- Genus: Coleophora
- Species: C. lasiocharis

Binomial name
- Coleophora lasiocharis Meyrick, 1931

Synonyms
- Coleophora schirazella Toll, 1959

Species of moth

Coleophora lasiocharis is a moth of the family Coleophoridae. It is found in Turkestan, Uzbekistan and Iran.

The larvae feed on Glycyrrhiza glabra. They feed on the shoots of their host plant.
