= Catoptria pfeifferi =

Scientific classification
- Kingdom: Animalia
- Phylum: Arthropoda
- Clade: Pancrustacea
- Class: Insecta
- Order: Lepidoptera
- Family: Crambidae
- Genus: Catoptria
- Species: C. pfeifferi

Binomial name
- Catoptria pfeifferi (Osthelder, 1938)

Synonyms
- Crambus pfeifferi Osthelder, 1938

Species of moth

Catoptria pfeifferi is a moth in the family Crambidae. It was described by Osthelder in 1938. It is found in Iran.
