= Apiletria purulentella =

Scientific classification
- Kingdom: Animalia
- Phylum: Arthropoda
- Clade: Pancrustacea
- Class: Insecta
- Order: Lepidoptera
- Family: Autostichidae
- Genus: Apiletria
- Species: A. purulentella

Binomial name
- Apiletria purulentella (Stainton, 1867)

Synonyms
- Aretascetis endopercna Meyrick, 1936

Species of moth

Apiletria purulentella is a moth in the family Autostichidae. It was described by Henry Tibbats Stainton in 1867. It is found in Palestine, Armenia, Iran and Iraq.

The wingspan is about 30 mm for males and 28 mm for females.
