= Coleophora bedella =

Scientific classification
- Kingdom: Animalia
- Phylum: Arthropoda
- Class: Insecta
- Order: Lepidoptera
- Family: Coleophoridae
- Genus: Coleophora
- Species: C. bedella

Binomial name
- Coleophora bedella Falkovitsh, 1976

Species of moth

Coleophora bedella is a moth of the family Coleophoridae that can be found in Iran and Tajikistan.

The larvae feed on Salix australis and Populus nigra. They feed on the leaves of their host plant.
