= Scopula ansulata =

Scientific classification
- Domain: Eukaryota
- Kingdom: Animalia
- Phylum: Arthropoda
- Class: Insecta
- Order: Lepidoptera
- Family: Geometridae
- Genus: Scopula
- Species: S. ansulata

Binomial name
- Scopula ansulata (Lederer, 1871)

Synonyms
- Acidalia ansulata Lederer, 1871; Acidalia adulteraria Erschoff, 1874; Scopula adulteraria; Acidalia characteristica Alphéraky, 1883; Scopula eberti Wiltshire, 1967

Species of geometer moth in subfamily Sterrhinae

Scopula ansulata is a moth of the family Geometridae. It was described by Julius Lederer in 1871 and is found in Central Asia.

== Subspecies ==
- Scopula ansulata ansulata (Iran)
- Scopula ansulata adulteraria (Erschoff, 1874) (Turkestan)
- Scopula ansulata characteristica (Alphéraky, 1883) (Kuldscha)
- Scopula ansulata eberti Wiltshire, 1967 (Afghanistan)
