= Eupithecia nachadira =

Scientific classification
- Domain: Eukaryota
- Kingdom: Animalia
- Phylum: Arthropoda
- Class: Insecta
- Order: Lepidoptera
- Family: Geometridae
- Genus: Eupithecia
- Species: E. nachadira

Binomial name
- Eupithecia nachadira Brandt, 1941

Synonyms
- Eupithecia mandarinca Mironov, 2001

Species of moth

Eupithecia nachadira is a moth in the family Geometridae. It is found in Afghanistan and Iran, as well as Ukraine.
