= Coleophora decoratella =

Scientific classification
- Kingdom: Animalia
- Phylum: Arthropoda
- Class: Insecta
- Order: Lepidoptera
- Family: Coleophoridae
- Genus: Coleophora
- Species: C. decoratella

Binomial name
- Coleophora decoratella Toll, 1959

Species of moth

Coleophora decoratella is a moth of the family Coleophoridae. It is found in Iran.
