= Eupithecia despectaria =

Scientific classification
- Domain: Eukaryota
- Kingdom: Animalia
- Phylum: Arthropoda
- Class: Insecta
- Order: Lepidoptera
- Family: Geometridae
- Genus: Eupithecia
- Species: E. despectaria

Binomial name
- Eupithecia despectaria Lederer, 1853

Species of moth

Eupithecia despectaria is a moth in the family Geometridae. It is found in Russia (the South Siberian Mountains) and Kazakhstan.
