= Coleophora pauperculella =

Scientific classification
- Kingdom: Animalia
- Phylum: Arthropoda
- Class: Insecta
- Order: Lepidoptera
- Family: Coleophoridae
- Genus: Coleophora
- Species: C. pauperculella

Binomial name
- Coleophora pauperculella Toll, 1957

Species of moth

Coleophora pauperculella is a moth of the family Coleophoridae that can be found in Iran and Tunisia.
