= Ancylosis muliebris =

Scientific classification
- Kingdom: Animalia
- Phylum: Arthropoda
- Class: Insecta
- Order: Lepidoptera
- Family: Pyralidae
- Genus: Ancylosis
- Species: A. muliebris

Binomial name
- Ancylosis muliebris (Meyrick, 1937)

Synonyms
- Trissonca muliebris Meyrick, 1937; Heterographis macedonica Schawerda, 1937

Species of moth

Ancylosis muliebris is a species of snout moth in the genus Ancylosis. It was described by Edward Meyrick in 1937 from Iraq but is also found in North Macedonia.
