= Palpita persicalis =

Scientific classification
- Domain: Eukaryota
- Kingdom: Animalia
- Phylum: Arthropoda
- Class: Insecta
- Order: Lepidoptera
- Family: Crambidae
- Genus: Palpita
- Species: P. persicalis

Binomial name
- Palpita persicalis (Amsel, 1951)

Synonyms
- Apyrausta persicalis Amsel, 1951

Species of moth

Palpita persicalis is a moth in the family Crambidae. It is found in Iran.
