= Eupithecia obtinens =

Scientific classification
- Domain: Eukaryota
- Kingdom: Animalia
- Phylum: Arthropoda
- Class: Insecta
- Order: Lepidoptera
- Family: Geometridae
- Genus: Eupithecia
- Species: E. obtinens

Binomial name
- Eupithecia obtinens Brandt, 1941

Synonyms
- Eupithecia obtines Mohammadian, 2006; Eupithecia eberti Vojnits, 1978

Species of moth

Eupithecia obtinens is a moth in the family Geometridae. It is found in Afghanistan and Iran.
