= Eupithecia decipiens =

Scientific classification
- Domain: Eukaryota
- Kingdom: Animalia
- Phylum: Arthropoda
- Class: Insecta
- Order: Lepidoptera
- Family: Geometridae
- Genus: Eupithecia
- Species: E. decipiens

Binomial name
- Eupithecia decipiens Petersen, 1910

Species of moth

Eupithecia decipiens is a moth in the family Geometridae. It is found in Afghanistan, Iran, Uzbekistan and Kyrgyzstan. It is found at altitudes between 1,500 and 2,900 meters.
