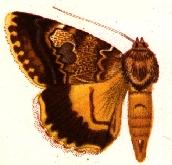

Scientific classification
- Kingdom: Animalia
- Phylum: Arthropoda
- Class: Insecta
- Order: Lepidoptera
- Superfamily: Noctuoidea
- Family: Erebidae
- Genus: Catocala
- Species: C. abacta

Binomial name
- Catocala abacta Staudinger, 1900

Synonyms
- Catocala irana Brandt, 1938

= Catocala abacta =

Species of moth

Catocala abacta is a moth of the family Erebidae. It is found in Asia Minor.

== Subspecies ==
- Catocala abacta abacta
- Catocala abacta irana Brandt, 1938 (Iran)
