= Coleophora iranella =

Scientific classification
- Kingdom: Animalia
- Phylum: Arthropoda
- Class: Insecta
- Order: Lepidoptera
- Family: Coleophoridae
- Genus: Coleophora
- Species: C. iranella

Binomial name
- Coleophora iranella Toll, 1959

Synonyms
- Coleophora stramentella agrammella Baldizzone, 1982

Species of moth

Coleophora iranella is a moth of the family Coleophoridae. It is found in Iran.
