= Eupithecia opistographata =

Scientific classification
- Domain: Eukaryota
- Kingdom: Animalia
- Phylum: Arthropoda
- Class: Insecta
- Order: Lepidoptera
- Family: Geometridae
- Genus: Eupithecia
- Species: E. opistographata

Binomial name
- Eupithecia opistographata Dietze, 1906

Synonyms
- Tephroclystia arenicola Rothschild, 1913

Species of moth

Eupithecia opistographata is a moth in the family Geometridae. It is found in Turkmenistan, Iran, Pakistan and China.
