= Coleophora niphomesta =

Scientific classification
- Kingdom: Animalia
- Phylum: Arthropoda
- Class: Insecta
- Order: Lepidoptera
- Family: Coleophoridae
- Genus: Coleophora
- Species: C. niphomesta

Binomial name
- Coleophora niphomesta Meyrick, 1917

Synonyms
- Coleophora sarobiensis Toll & Amsel, 1967

Species of moth

Coleophora niphomesta is a moth of the family Coleophoridae. It is found in Afghanistan, Iran, Turkmenistan, Pakistan, Oman and the United Arab Emirates.

The larvae feed on the leaves and fruit of Climacoptera turcomanica, Aerva javanica and Aerva persica.
