= Eupithecia mekrana =

Scientific classification
- Domain: Eukaryota
- Kingdom: Animalia
- Phylum: Arthropoda
- Class: Insecta
- Order: Lepidoptera
- Family: Geometridae
- Genus: Eupithecia
- Species: E. mekrana

Binomial name
- Eupithecia mekrana Brandt, 1941

Synonyms
- Eupithecia mekrana khorassana Brandt, 1941; Eupithecia idonea Vojnits, 1982; Eupithecia stulta Vojnits, 1982; Eupithecia commenticia Vojnits, 1982; Eupithecia mekrana amiralis Wiltshire, 1986; Eupithecia peridonea Mironov, 1989

Species of moth

Eupithecia mekrana is a moth in the family Geometridae. It is found from the steppen chalk hills in the Orenburg province in south-eastern European Russia in the north to Saudi Arabia in the south. It is also found in the eastern provinces of Turkey, Armenia, Azerbaijan, Afghanistan and Iran.
