= Scopula benigna =

Scientific classification
- Domain: Eukaryota
- Kingdom: Animalia
- Phylum: Arthropoda
- Class: Insecta
- Order: Lepidoptera
- Family: Geometridae
- Genus: Scopula
- Species: S. benigna

Binomial name
- Scopula benigna (Brandt, 1941)

Synonyms
- Glossotrophia benigna Brandt, 1941; Pseudocinglis benigna; Pseudocinglis nigromaculata Hausmann, 1994

Species of geometer moth in subfamily Sterrhinae

Scopula benigna is a moth of the family Geometridae. It is endemic to Iran.

== Subspecies ==
- Scopula benigna benigna (Iran)
- Scopula benigna nigromaculata (Hausmann, 1994)
