= Eupithecia bastelbergeri =

Scientific classification
- Domain: Eukaryota
- Kingdom: Animalia
- Phylum: Arthropoda
- Class: Insecta
- Order: Lepidoptera
- Family: Geometridae
- Genus: Eupithecia
- Species: E. bastelbergeri

Binomial name
- Eupithecia bastelbergeri Dietze, 1910

Species of moth

Eupithecia bastelbergeri is a moth in the family Geometridae. It is found in Kazakhstan, Kyrgyzstan, Russia, Iran and Turkey.

== Subspecies ==
- Eupithecia bastelbergeri bastelbergeri
- Eupithecia bastelbergeri korvaci Prout, 1938 (Turkey)
