= Eupithecia demetata =

Scientific classification
- Domain: Eukaryota
- Kingdom: Animalia
- Phylum: Arthropoda
- Class: Insecta
- Order: Lepidoptera
- Family: Geometridae
- Genus: Eupithecia
- Species: E. demetata

Binomial name
- Eupithecia demetata Christoph, 1885

Synonyms
- Eupithecia draudti Dietze, 1910

Species of moth

Eupithecia demetata is a moth in the family Geometridae. It is found in Turkmenistan.
