= Coleophora paragiraudi =

Scientific classification
- Kingdom: Animalia
- Phylum: Arthropoda
- Class: Insecta
- Order: Lepidoptera
- Family: Coleophoridae
- Genus: Coleophora
- Species: C. paragiraudi

Binomial name
- Coleophora paragiraudi Toll, 1959

Species of moth

Coleophora paragiraudi is a moth of the family Coleophoridae which is found in Iran.
