= Coleophora sogdianae =

Scientific classification
- Kingdom: Animalia
- Phylum: Arthropoda
- Clade: Pancrustacea
- Class: Insecta
- Order: Lepidoptera
- Family: Coleophoridae
- Genus: Coleophora
- Species: C. sogdianae

Binomial name
- Coleophora sogdianae Baldizzone, 1994

Species of moth

Coleophora sogdianae is a moth of the family Coleophoridae. It is found in Afghanistan, Iran, Pakistan and Oman.
