= Scopula subtilata =

Scientific classification
- Domain: Eukaryota
- Kingdom: Animalia
- Phylum: Arthropoda
- Class: Insecta
- Order: Lepidoptera
- Family: Geometridae
- Genus: Scopula
- Species: S. subtilata

Binomial name
- Scopula subtilata (Christoph, 1867)

Synonyms
- Acidalia subtilata Christoph, 1867

Species of geometer moth in subfamily Sterrhinae

Scopula subtilata is a moth of the family Geometridae. It is found in southern Russia and Ukraine.
