= Ephelis palealis =

Scientific classification
- Domain: Eukaryota
- Kingdom: Animalia
- Phylum: Arthropoda
- Class: Insecta
- Order: Lepidoptera
- Family: Crambidae
- Genus: Ephelis
- Species: E. palealis

Binomial name
- Ephelis palealis (Amsel, 1949)

Synonyms
- Emprepes palealis Amsel, 1949; Emprepes comealis Amsel, 1951

Species of moth

Ephelis palealis is a moth in the family Crambidae. It is found in Iran.
