= Eupithecia cheituna =

Scientific classification
- Domain: Eukaryota
- Kingdom: Animalia
- Phylum: Arthropoda
- Class: Insecta
- Order: Lepidoptera
- Family: Geometridae
- Genus: Eupithecia
- Species: E. cheituna

Binomial name
- Eupithecia cheituna Brandt, 1938

Species of moth

Eupithecia cheituna is a moth in the family Geometridae. It is found in Iran.
