= Ancylolomia micropalpella =

Scientific classification
- Kingdom: Animalia
- Phylum: Arthropoda
- Clade: Pancrustacea
- Class: Insecta
- Order: Lepidoptera
- Family: Crambidae
- Subfamily: Crambinae
- Tribe: Ancylolomiini
- Genus: Ancylolomia
- Species: A. micropalpella

Binomial name
- Ancylolomia micropalpella Amsel, 1951

Synonyms
- Ancylolomia benderella Amsel, 1951

Species of moth

Ancylolomia micropalpella is a moth in the family Crambidae. It was described by Hans Georg Amsel in 1951. It is found in Iran, Bahrain, Saudi Arabia and the United Arab Emirates.
