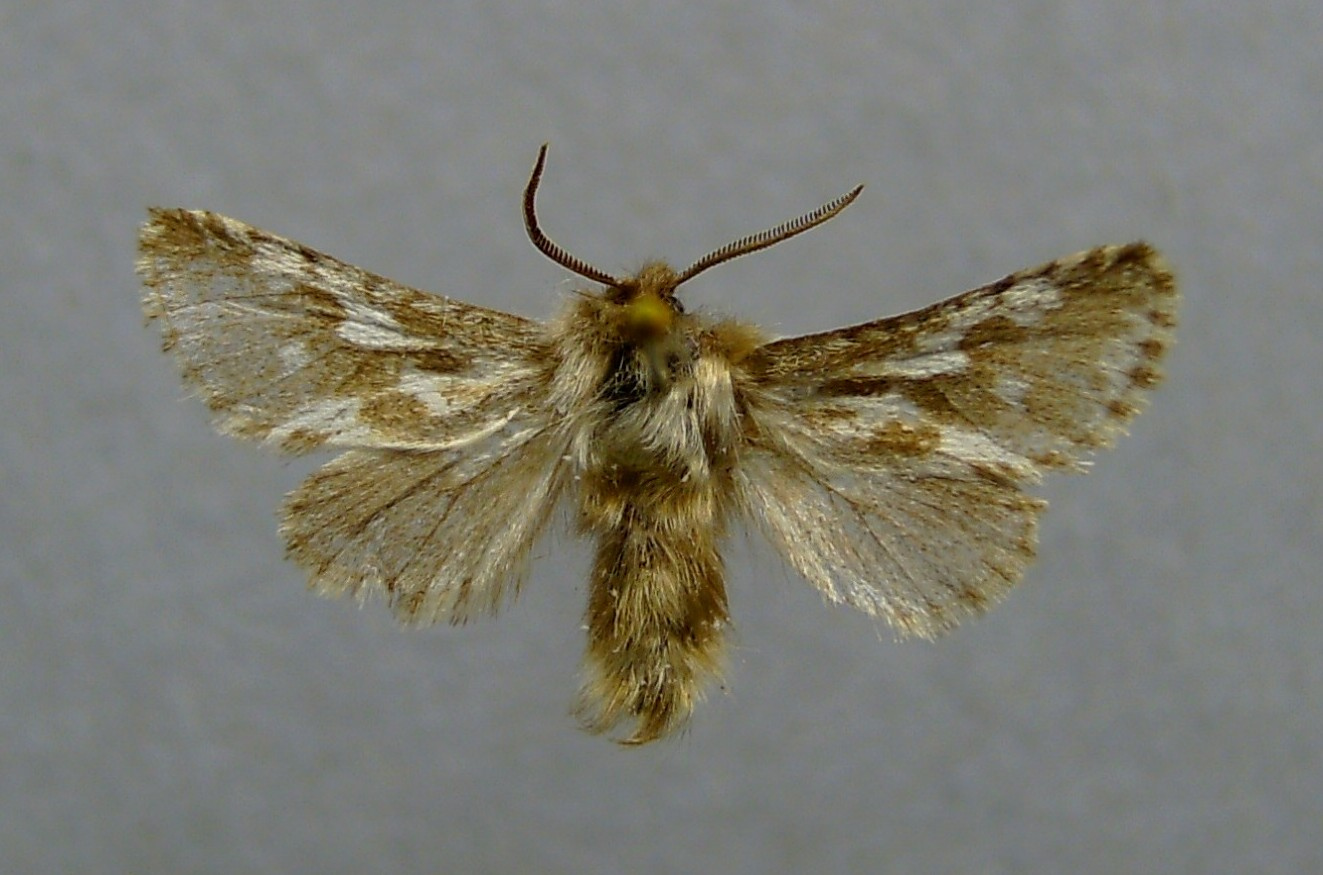
- Dyspessa ulula

Scientific classification
- Kingdom: Animalia
- Phylum: Arthropoda
- Clade: Pancrustacea
- Class: Insecta
- Order: Lepidoptera
- Family: Cossidae
- Subfamily: Cossinae
- Genus: Dyspessa; Hübner, 1820

Species
- See text

Synonyms
- Endagria Boisduval, 1834

= Dyspessa =

Genus of moths

Dyspessa is a genus of moths belonging to the family Cossidae. It was described by Jacob Hübner in 1820.

== Selected species ==
- Dyspessa aculeata Turati, 1909
- Dyspessa affinis Rothschild, 1912
- Dyspessa albina Rothschild, 1912
- Dyspessa albosignata Rothschild, 1912
- Dyspessa algeriensis (Rambur, 1858)
- Dyspessa alipanahae Yakovlev, 2008
- Dyspessa alpherakyi (Christoph in Romanoff, 1885)
- Dyspessa aphrodite Yakovlev & Witt, 2007
- Dyspessa arabeska Yakovlev, 2005
- Dyspessa argaeensis Rebel, 1905
- Dyspessa ariadne Yakovlev, 2008
- Dyspessa artemis Yakovlev, 2008
- Dyspessa aurora Yakovlev, 2008
- Dyspessa blonda Yakovlev, 2008
- Dyspessa cerberus Daniel, 1939
- Dyspessa curta Rothschild, 1912
- Dyspessa cyprica Rebel, 1927
- Dyspessa cyrenaica Turati, 1916
- Dyspessa daralagezi Yakovlev, 2008
- Dyspessa defreinai Yakovlev, 2008
- Dyspessa delrei Turati, 1936
- Dyspessa dueldueli Daniel, 1939
- Dyspessa elbursensis Daniel, 1964
  - Dyspessa elbursensis derbenti Daniel, 1964
- Dyspessa emilia (Staudinger, 1878)
- Dyspessa fantolii Kruger, 1934
- Dyspessa fuscula (Staudinger, 1892)
- Dyspessa hethitica Daniel, 1932
- Dyspessa infuscata (Staudinger, 1892)
- Dyspessa kabylaria Bang-Haas, 1906
- Dyspessa karatavica Yakovlev, 2007
- Dyspessa kostjuki Yakovlev, 2005
- Dyspessa lacertula (Staudinger, 1887)
- Dyspessa manas Yakovlev, 2007
- Dyspessa marikowskyi Yakovlev, 2007
- Dyspessa maroccana Rothschild, 1917
- Dyspessa mogola Yakovlev, 2007
- Dyspessa nigritula (Staudinger, 1887)
- Dyspessa pallida Rothschild, 1912
- Dyspessa pallidata (Staudinger, 1892)
- Dyspessa psychidion (Staudinger, 1871)
- Dyspessa rothschildi Yakovlev, 2011
- Dyspessa rueckbeili Yakovlev, 2007
- Dyspessa saldaitisi Yakovlev, 2011
- Dyspessa salicicola (Eversmann, 1848)
- Dyspessa serica Brandt, 1938
- Dyspessa sochivkoi Yakovlev, 2008
- Dyspessa stroehlei Yakovlev, 2008
- Dyspessa suavis (Staudinger, 1900)
- Dyspessa syrtica Kruger, 1932
- Dyspessa taurica Rebel, 1905
- Dyspessa thianshanica Daniel, 1964
- Dyspessa tsvetaevi Yakovlev, 2008
- Dyspessa turbinans Turati, 1926
- Dyspessa tyumasevae Yakovlev, 2008
- Dyspessa ulula (Borkhausen, 1790)
- Dyspessa wagneri Schwingenschuss, 1939
- Dyspessa walteri Yakovlev, 2011
- Dyspessa wiltshirei Daniel, 1938
- Dyspessa zurvan Yakovlev, 2008

== Former species ==
- Dyspessa foeda (Swinhoe, 1899)
- Dyspessa tristis Bang-Haas, 1912
