= Semagystia bucharana =

Scientific classification
- Domain: Eukaryota
- Kingdom: Animalia
- Phylum: Arthropoda
- Class: Insecta
- Order: Lepidoptera
- Family: Cossidae
- Genus: Semagystia
- Species: S. bucharana

Binomial name
- Semagystia bucharana (A. Bang-Haas, 1910)

Synonyms
- Dyspessa bucharana A. Bang-Haas, 1910

Species of moth

Semagystia bucharana is a moth in the family Cossidae. It was described by Andreas Bang-Haas in 1910. It is found in Uzbekistan and Kazakhstan.
