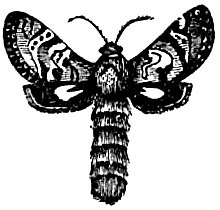
- "Lepidoptera," Encyclopædia Britannica (11th ed.), v. 16, 1911, p. 471, Fig. 18.

Scientific classification
- Domain: Eukaryota
- Kingdom: Animalia
- Phylum: Arthropoda
- Class: Insecta
- Order: Lepidoptera
- Family: Cossidae
- Genus: Stygia
- Species: S. australis

Binomial name
- Stygia australis Latreille, 1804

Synonyms
- Bombyx terebellum Hübner, [1808]; Chimaera leucomelas Ochsenheimer, 1808; Stygia australis var. rosina Staudinger, 1894

= Stygia australis =

Species of moth

Stygia australis is a species of moth of the family Cossidae. It is found in France, Italy, Portugal and Spain. "This species is common in Southern Europe. It expands about an inch. The head and thorax are brownish-yellow, and so are the antennae. The abdomen is elongated, blue-black in colour with a small anal tuft. The fore-wings are narrow, brownish in the male, with greyish-white markings, and the hind-wings are rounded, blue-black, with a large white spot in the centre. In the female the fore-wings are reddish-yellow, varied with brownish, and the hind-wings are coloured as in the male. The larva, which is smooth and whitish, with the head and thoracic segments yellowish, lives in the roots and stalks of Echium italicum". Now it is very little known.

The larvae feed on the roots of Echium italicum. in hot places.

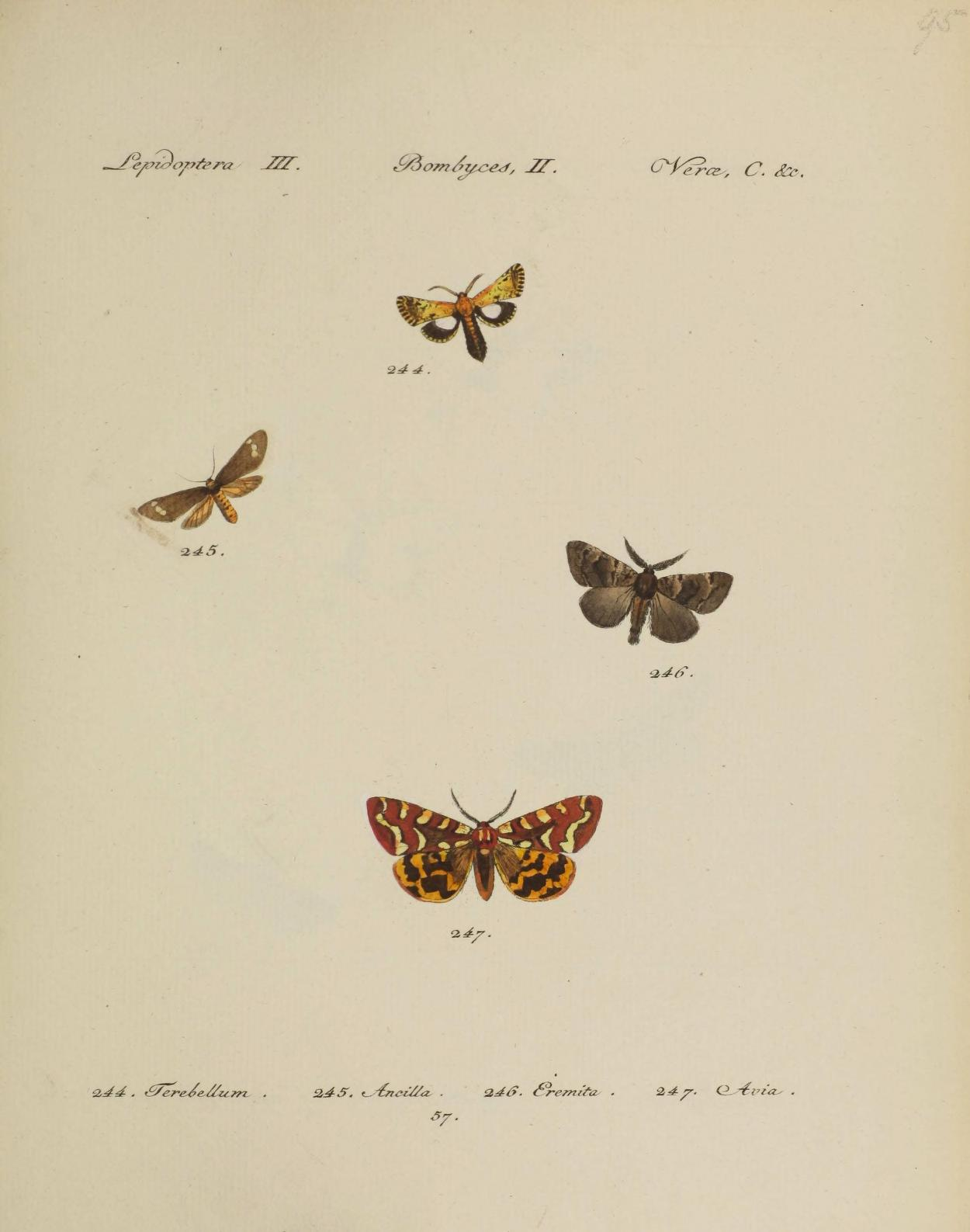
as terebellum in Hübner, [1808] Sammlung europäischer Schmetterlinge

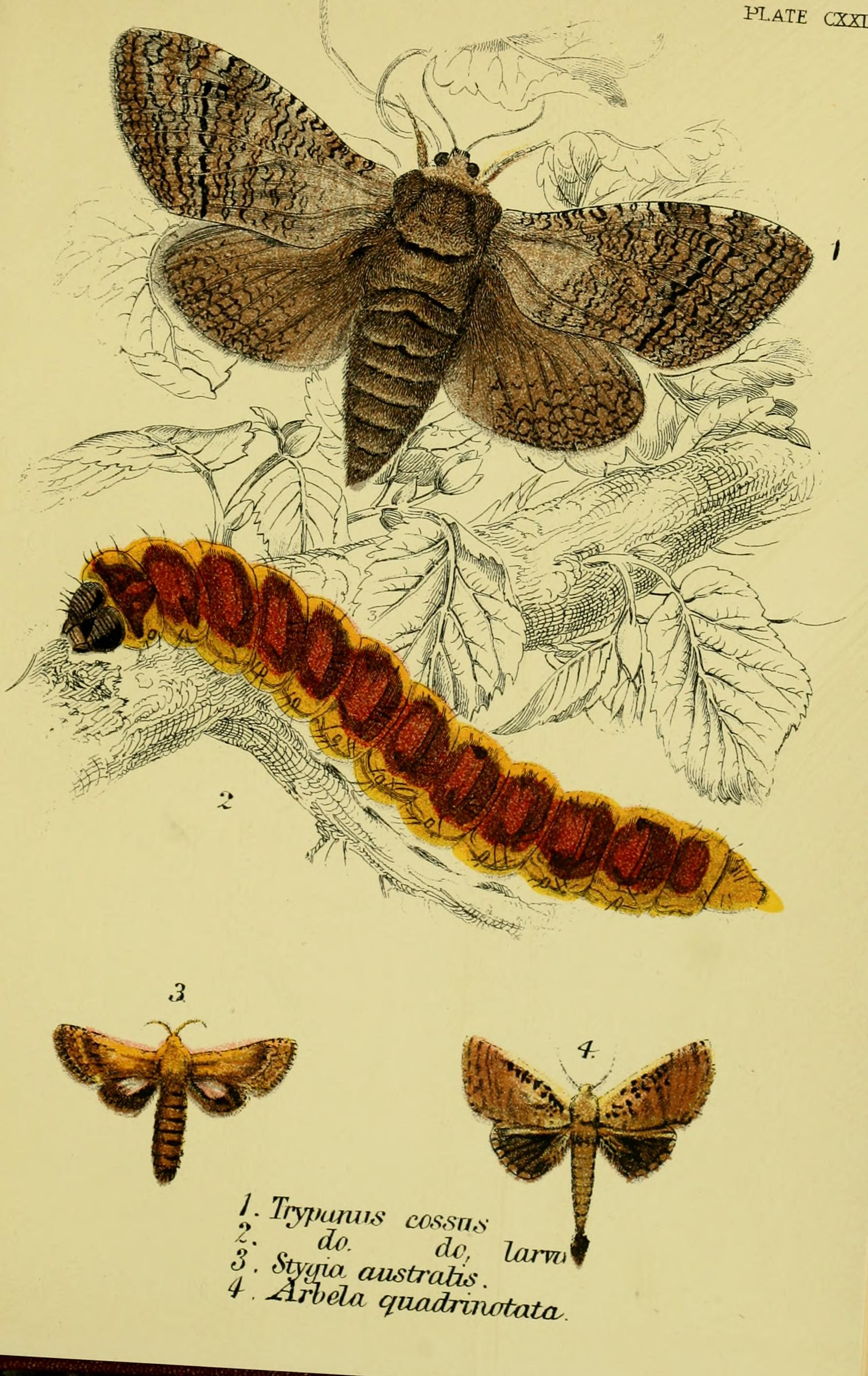
as australis in Kirby, 1897

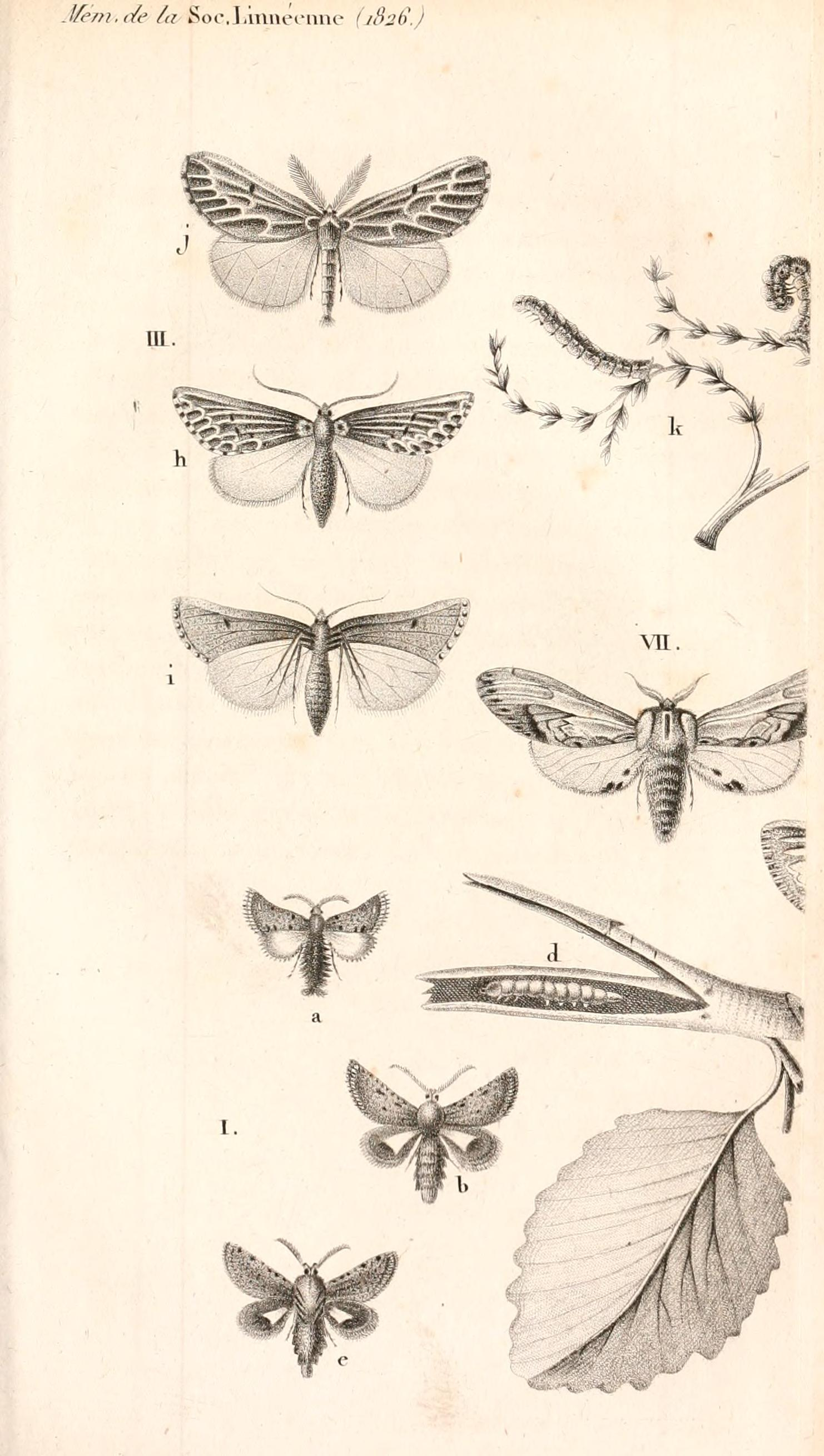
in Villiers (Adrien-Prudent de), 1827.- Note sur trois Lépidoptères....
