= Semagystia =

Scientific classification
- Kingdom: Animalia
- Phylum: Arthropoda
- Clade: Pancrustacea
- Class: Insecta
- Order: Lepidoptera
- Family: Cossidae
- Genus: Semagystia; Schoorl, 1990

Synonyms
- Samagystia

Genus of moths

Semagystia is a genus of moths in the family Cossidae.

== Species ==
- Semagystia agilis (Christoph, 1884)
- Semagystia alaica Yakovlev, 2007
- Semagystia bucharana (Bang-Haas, 1910)
- Semagystia clathrata (Christoph, 1884)
- Semagystia cossoides (Graeser, 1892)
- Semagystia cuhensis de Freina, 1994
- Semagystia dubatolovi Yakovlev, 2007
- Semagystia enigma Yakovlev, 2007
- Semagystia kamelini Yakovlev, 2004
- Semagystia lacertula (Staudinger, 1887)
- Semagystia lukhtanovi Yakovlev, 2007
- Semagystia monticola (Grum-Grshimailo, 1890)
- Semagystia pljustchi Yakovlev, 2007
- Semagystia pushtunica Yakovlev, 2007
- Semagystia stchetkini Yakovlev, 2007
- Semagystia tristis (Bang-Haas, 1912)
- Semagystia tsimgana (Zukowsky, 1936)
- Semagystia wernerithomasi Yakovlev, 2007
- Semagystia witti Yakovlev, 2007

== Etymology ==
The genus name is an anagram of the genus name Stygia, plus Greek sema (meaning blaze).
