= Cleonymia fatima =

Scientific classification
- Domain: Eukaryota
- Kingdom: Animalia
- Phylum: Arthropoda
- Class: Insecta
- Order: Lepidoptera
- Superfamily: Noctuoidea
- Family: Noctuidae
- Genus: Cleonymia
- Species: C. fatima

Binomial name
- Cleonymia fatima (A. Bang-Haas, 1907)

Synonyms
- Cleophana fatima A. Bang-Haas, 1907

Species of moth

Cleonymia fatima is a moth of the family Noctuidae first described by Andreas Bang-Haas in 1907. It is found in Algeria, Tunisia, Libya, Jordan and Israel.

Adults are on wing from February to March. There is one generation per year.
