= Dyspessa kabylaria =

Scientific classification
- Kingdom: Animalia
- Phylum: Arthropoda
- Class: Insecta
- Order: Lepidoptera
- Family: Cossidae
- Genus: Dyspessa
- Species: D. kabylaria

Binomial name
- Dyspessa kabylaria A. Bang-Haas, 1906

Synonyms
- Dyspessa habylaria Wiltshire, 1949

Species of moth

Dyspessa kabylaria is a species of moth of the family Cossidae. It is found in Iran, Israel, Jordan, Tunisia, Algeria, Egypt and Saudi Arabia.

Adults have been recorded on wing from December to April in Israel.

The larvae probably feed on Allium species.
