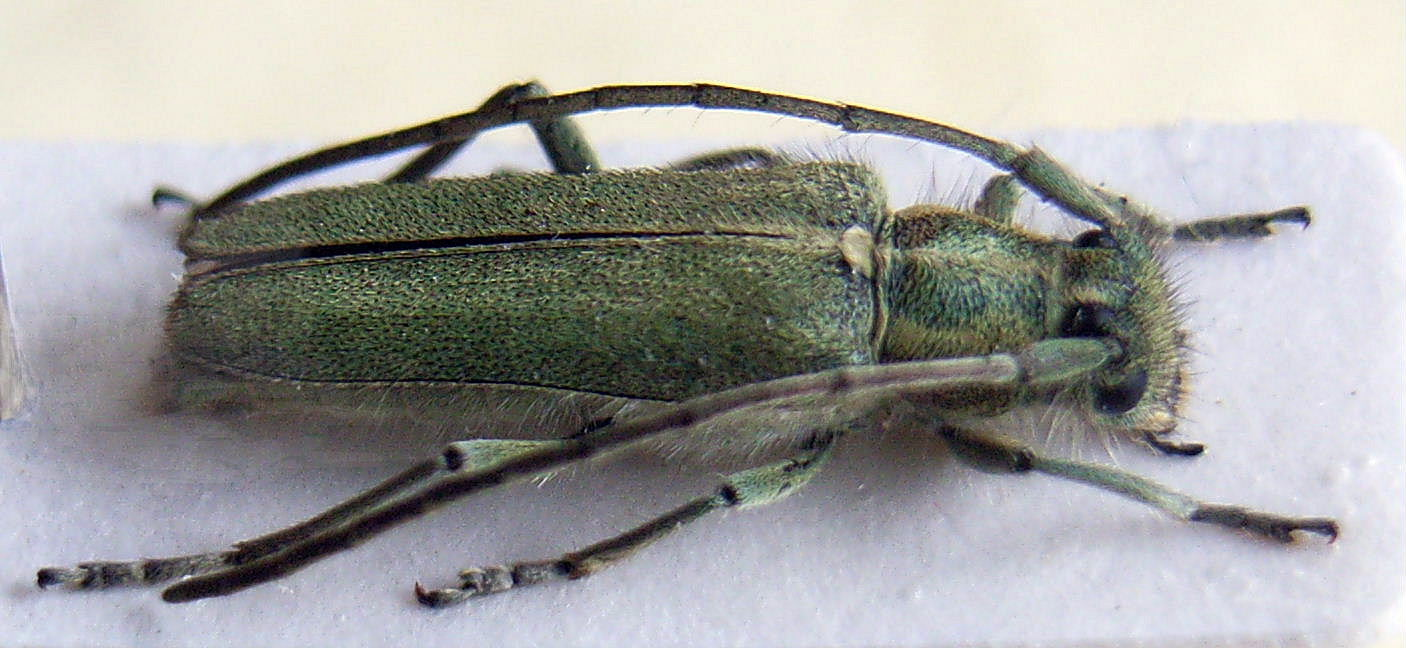

Scientific classification
- Domain: Eukaryota
- Kingdom: Animalia
- Phylum: Arthropoda
- Class: Insecta
- Order: Coleoptera
- Suborder: Polyphaga
- Infraorder: Cucujiformia
- Family: Cerambycidae
- Genus: Opsilia
- Species: O. coerulescens

Binomial name
- Opsilia coerulescens (Scopoli, 1763)

Synonyms
- Lamia virescens (Fabricius, 1781); Leptura coerulescens Scopoli, 1763; Leptura subcoerulea Geoffroy, 1785; Leptura viridiuscula Goeze, 1777; Phytoecia coerulescens (Scopoli, 1763); Phytoecia virescens (Fabricius, 1781); Saperda virescens Fabricius, 1781

= Opsilia coerulescens =

Species of beetle

Opsilia coerulescens is a gray coloured species of a beetle from family longhorn beetle, subfamily Lamiinae.

== Development ==
They feed on Echium species, including Echium vulgare and Echium italicum.

== Subspecies ==
- Phytoecia coerulescens coerulescens (Scopoli, 1763)
- Phytoecia coerulescens cretensis Breuning, 1947
