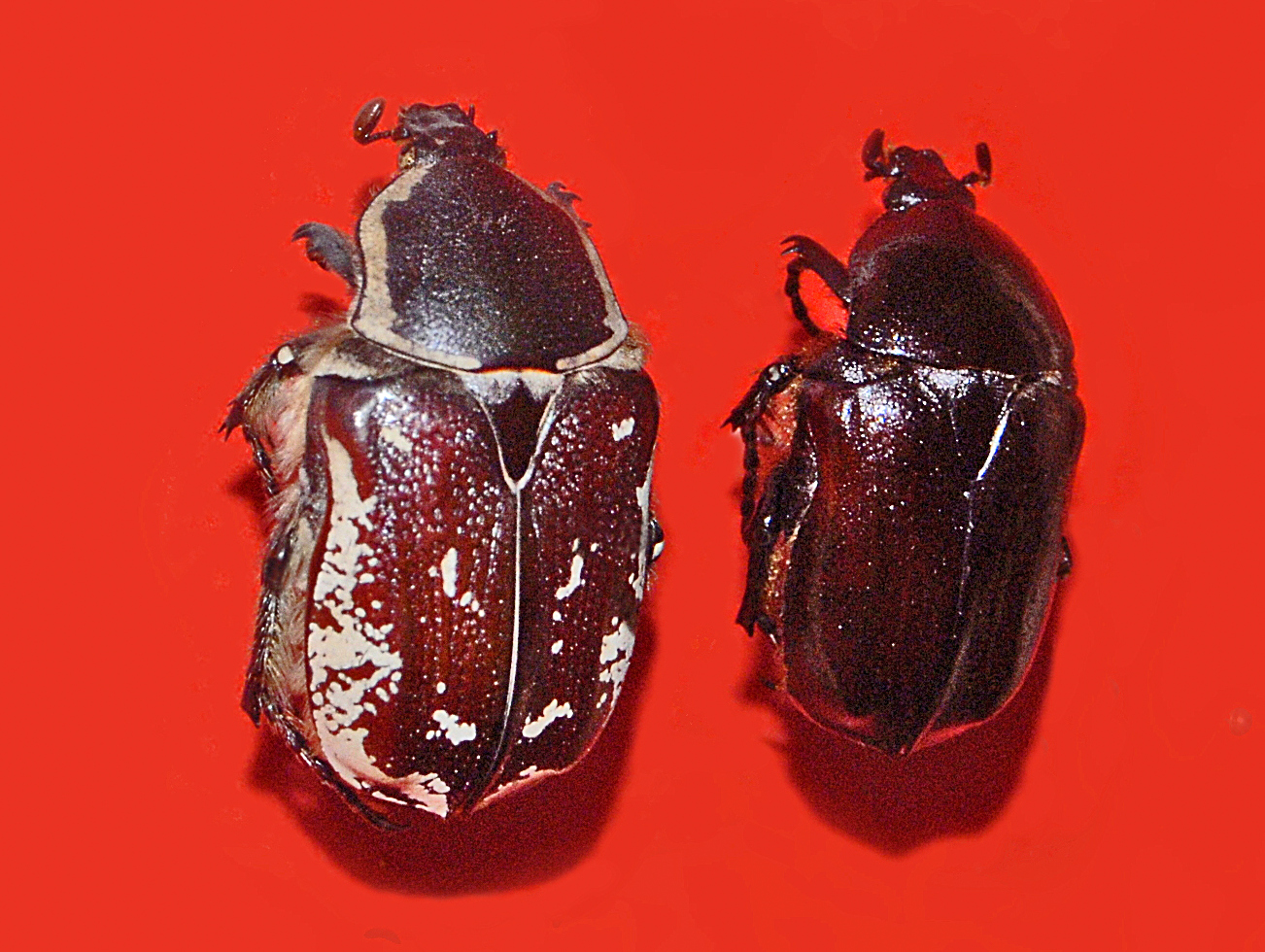
- Mounted specimen of Aethiessa floralis

Scientific classification
- Kingdom: Animalia
- Phylum: Arthropoda
- Class: Insecta
- Order: Coleoptera
- Suborder: Polyphaga
- Infraorder: Scarabaeiformia
- Family: Scarabaeidae
- Genus: Aethiessa
- Species: A. floralis

Binomial name
- Aethiessa floralis (Fabricius, 1787)

Synonyms
- Cetonia floralis Fabricius, 1787

= Aethiessa floralis =

Species of beetle

Aethiessa floralis is a species of beetles belonging to the family Scarabaeidae, subfamily Cetoniinae.

== Description ==
Aethiessa floralis can reach a length of about 10–25 millimetres (0.39–0.98 in). Basic color is shiny black–brown, with quite variable whitish markings, mainly in lateral margins. Adults can be seen from May to September mainly feeding on flowers of thistles (Silybum sp.), but also on Echium italicum.

== Distribution and habitat ==
This species can be found in Italy, Spain, Slovenia and in North Africa from Morocco to Libya. These beetles prefer sunny or arid environments.

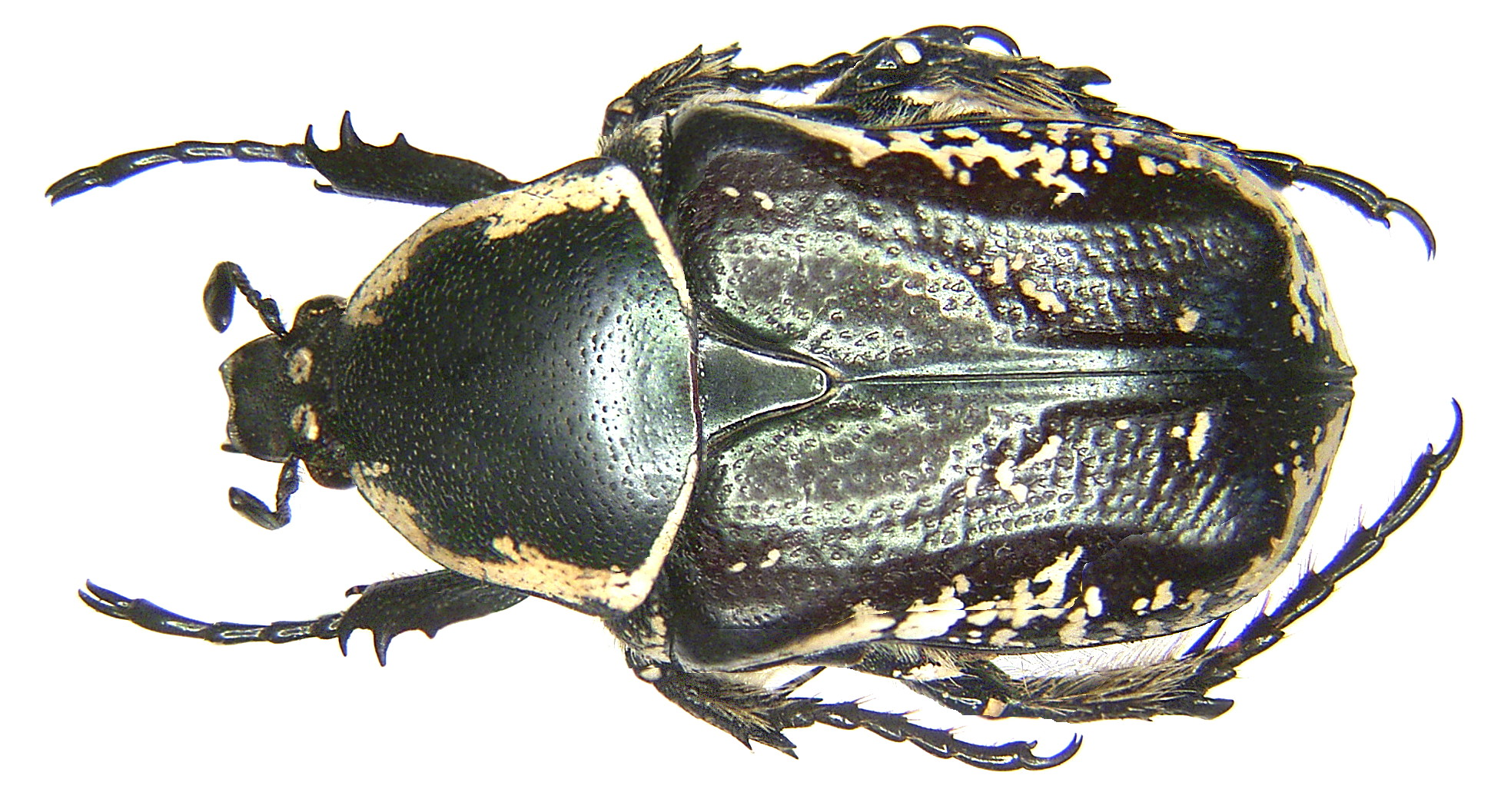
Aethiessa floralis
