= Cleonymia jubata =

Scientific classification
- Domain: Eukaryota
- Kingdom: Animalia
- Phylum: Arthropoda
- Class: Insecta
- Order: Lepidoptera
- Superfamily: Noctuoidea
- Family: Noctuidae
- Genus: Cleonymia
- Species: C. jubata

Binomial name
- Cleonymia jubata (Oberthür, 1890)

Species of moth

Cleonymia jubata is a moth of the family Noctuidae. It is found in all of North Africa from the western parts of the Sahara to Morocco and Libya, Iraq and Israel.

Adults are on wing from February to April. There is one generation per year.
