= Stygia nilssoni =

Scientific classification
- Kingdom: Animalia
- Phylum: Arthropoda
- Clade: Pancrustacea
- Class: Insecta
- Order: Lepidoptera
- Family: Cossidae
- Genus: Stygia
- Species: S. nilssoni

Binomial name
- Stygia nilssoni Saldaitis & Yakovlev, 2008

Species of moth

Stygia nilssoni is a species of moth of the family Cossidae. It is found on the Canary Islands.
