= Dyspessa psychidion =

Scientific classification
- Kingdom: Animalia
- Phylum: Arthropoda
- Class: Insecta
- Order: Lepidoptera
- Family: Cossidae
- Genus: Dyspessa
- Species: D. psychidion

Binomial name
- Dyspessa psychidion (Staudinger, 1871)

Synonyms
- Endagria psychidion Staudinger, 1871

Species of moth

Dyspessa psychidion is a species of moth of the family Cossidae. It is found in Greece.
