= Dyspessa thianshanica =

Scientific classification
- Kingdom: Animalia
- Phylum: Arthropoda
- Class: Insecta
- Order: Lepidoptera
- Family: Cossidae
- Genus: Dyspessa
- Species: D. thianshanica

Binomial name
- Dyspessa thianshanica Daniel, 1964

Species of moth

Dyspessa thianshanica is a species of moth of the family Cossidae. It was described by Franz Daniel in 1964. It is found in Turkmenistan.
