= Dyspessa alpherakyi =

Scientific classification
- Kingdom: Animalia
- Phylum: Arthropoda
- Class: Insecta
- Order: Lepidoptera
- Family: Cossidae
- Genus: Dyspessa
- Species: D. alpherakyi

Binomial name
- Dyspessa alpherakyi (Christoph in Romanoff, 1885)

Synonyms
- Endagria alpherakyi Christoph in Romanoff, 1885

Species of moth

Dyspessa alpherakyi is a species of moth of the family Cossidae. It was described by Hugo Theodor Christoph in 1885. It is found in Transcaucasia (Georgia, Azerbaijan) and Armenia.
