= Dyspessa nigritula =

Scientific classification
- Kingdom: Animalia
- Phylum: Arthropoda
- Class: Insecta
- Order: Lepidoptera
- Family: Cossidae
- Genus: Dyspessa
- Species: D. nigritula

Binomial name
- Dyspessa nigritula (Staudinger, 1887)

Synonyms
- Endagria nigritula Staudinger, 1887

Species of moth

Dyspessa nigritula is a species of moth of the family Cossidae. It is found in Afghanistan and Kirghizistan.
