= Dyspessa hethitica =

Scientific classification
- Kingdom: Animalia
- Phylum: Arthropoda
- Class: Insecta
- Order: Lepidoptera
- Family: Cossidae
- Genus: Dyspessa
- Species: D. hethitica

Binomial name
- Dyspessa hethitica Daniel, 1932

Species of moth

Dyspessa hethitica is a species of moth of the family Cossidae. It is found in Turkey.
