= Dyspessa algeriensis =

Scientific classification
- Kingdom: Animalia
- Phylum: Arthropoda
- Class: Insecta
- Order: Lepidoptera
- Family: Cossidae
- Genus: Dyspessa
- Species: D. algeriensis

Binomial name
- Dyspessa algeriensis (Rambur, 1858)

Synonyms
- Endagria algeriensis Rambur, 1858

Species of moth

Dyspessa algeriensis is a species of moth of the family Cossidae. It is found in Algeria and Tunisia.
