= Semagystia kamelini =

Scientific classification
- Kingdom: Animalia
- Phylum: Arthropoda
- Clade: Pancrustacea
- Class: Insecta
- Order: Lepidoptera
- Family: Cossidae
- Genus: Semagystia
- Species: S. kamelini

Binomial name
- Semagystia kamelini Yakovlev, 2004

Species of moth

Semagystia kamelini is a moth in the family Cossidae. It was described by Yakovlev in 2004. It is found in the Narym Mountains of Kazakhstan and Kyrgyzstan.
