= Opsilia aspericollis =

Scientific classification
- Domain: Eukaryota
- Kingdom: Animalia
- Phylum: Arthropoda
- Class: Insecta
- Order: Coleoptera
- Suborder: Polyphaga
- Infraorder: Cucujiformia
- Family: Cerambycidae
- Genus: Opsilia
- Species: O. aspericollis

Binomial name
- Opsilia aspericollis Holzschuh, 1981

Species of beetle

Opsilia aspericollis is a species of beetle from the family Cerambycidae native to Kazakhstan.
