= Dyspessa fuscula =

Scientific classification
- Kingdom: Animalia
- Phylum: Arthropoda
- Class: Insecta
- Order: Lepidoptera
- Family: Cossidae
- Genus: Dyspessa
- Species: D. fuscula

Binomial name
- Dyspessa fuscula (Staudinger, 1892)

Synonyms
- Endagria fuscula Staudinger, 1892

Species of moth

Dyspessa fuscula is a species of moth of the family Cossidae. It is found in Algeria and Tunisia.
