= Dyspessa fantolii =

Scientific classification
- Kingdom: Animalia
- Phylum: Arthropoda
- Class: Insecta
- Order: Lepidoptera
- Family: Cossidae
- Genus: Dyspessa
- Species: D. fantolii

Binomial name
- Dyspessa fantolii Kruger, 1934

Species of moth

Dyspessa fantolii is a species of moth of the family Cossidae. It is found in Libya.
