= Opsilia molybdaena =

Scientific classification
- Domain: Eukaryota
- Kingdom: Animalia
- Phylum: Arthropoda
- Class: Insecta
- Order: Coleoptera
- Suborder: Polyphaga
- Infraorder: Cucujiformia
- Family: Cerambycidae
- Genus: Opsilia
- Species: O. molybdaena

Binomial name
- Opsilia molybdaena (Dalman, 1817)

Species of beetle

Opsilia molybdaena is a species of beetle from a family Cerambycidae, that can be found in North Africa, South and Southeast Europe.
