= Dyspessa maroccana =

Scientific classification
- Kingdom: Animalia
- Phylum: Arthropoda
- Class: Insecta
- Order: Lepidoptera
- Family: Cossidae
- Genus: Dyspessa
- Species: D. maroccana

Binomial name
- Dyspessa maroccana Rothschild, 1917

Synonyms
- Dyspessa marmorata maroccana Rothschild, 1917

Species of moth

Dyspessa maroccana is a species of moth of the family Cossidae. It is found in Morocco.
