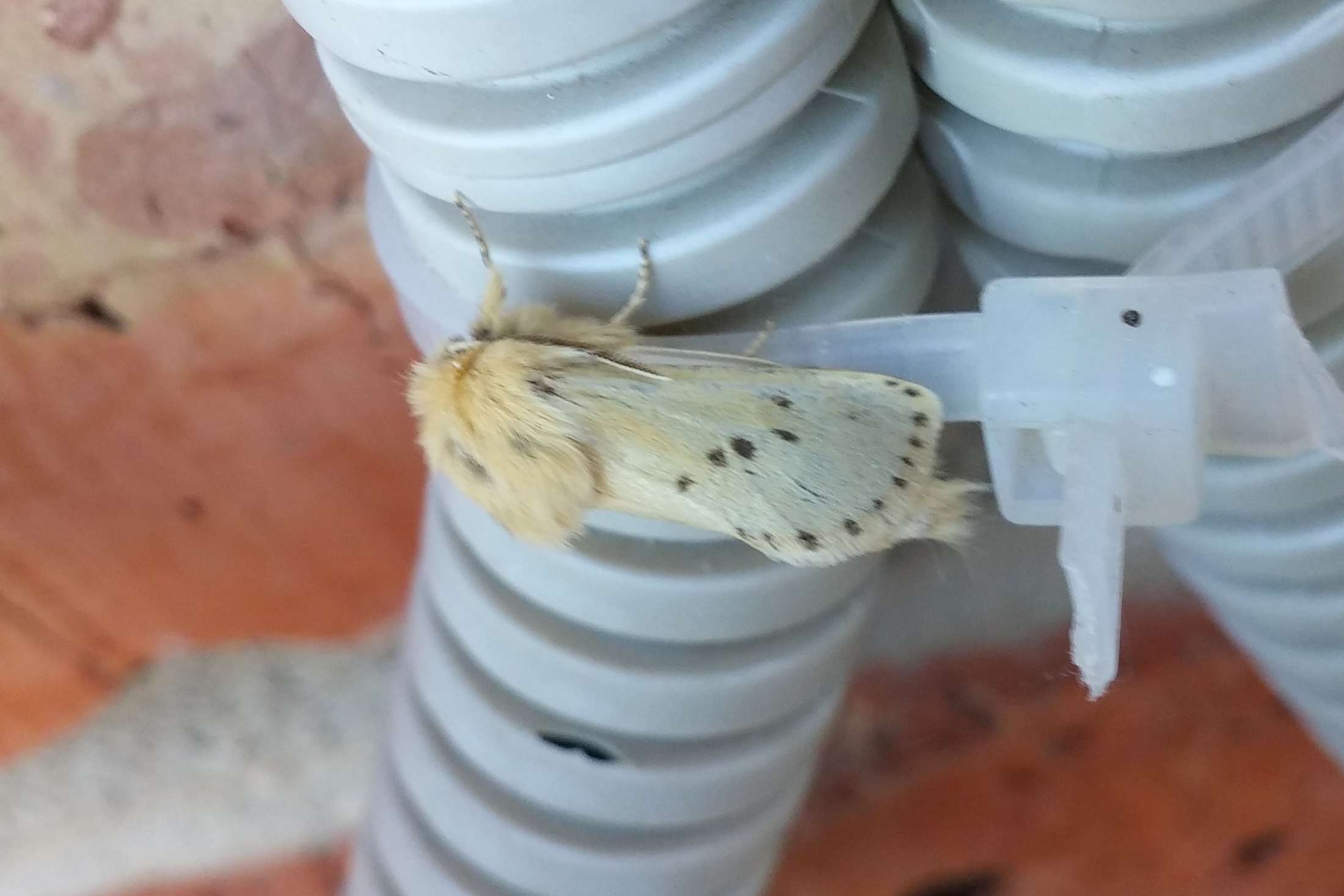

Scientific classification
- Kingdom: Animalia
- Phylum: Arthropoda
- Class: Insecta
- Order: Lepidoptera
- Family: Cossidae
- Genus: Dyspessa
- Species: D. salicicola

Binomial name
- Dyspessa salicicola (Eversmann, 1848)

Synonyms
- Cossus salicicola Eversmann, 1848; Dyspessa salicicola f. lutescens Silbernagel, 1944

= Dyspessa salicicola =

Species of moth

Dyspessa salicicola is a species of moth of the family Cossidae. It was described by Eduard Friedrich Eversmann in 1848. It is found in Greece, North Macedonia, Bulgaria, Romania, Ukraine, Russia and Turkey.

The length of the forewings is 9–14 mm for males and 9–15 mm for females.

== Subspecies ==
- Dyspessa salicicola salicicola
- Dyspessa salicicola aschabadensis Daniel, 1962 (Central Asia)
