= Stygia hades =

Scientific classification
- Domain: Eukaryota
- Kingdom: Animalia
- Phylum: Arthropoda
- Class: Insecta
- Order: Lepidoptera
- Family: Cossidae
- Genus: Stygia
- Species: S. hades

Binomial name
- Stygia hades Le Cerf, 1924

Species of moth

Stygia hades is a species of moth of the family Cossidae. It is found on the Canary Islands, as well as in North Africa, including Morocco.
