= Dyspessa albina =

Scientific classification
- Kingdom: Animalia
- Phylum: Arthropoda
- Class: Insecta
- Order: Lepidoptera
- Family: Cossidae
- Genus: Dyspessa
- Species: D. albina

Binomial name
- Dyspessa albina Rothschild, 1912

Species of moth

Dyspessa albina is a species of moth of the family Cossidae. It is found in the Pamir Mountains of Central Asia.
