= Dyspessa cyprica =

Scientific classification
- Kingdom: Animalia
- Phylum: Arthropoda
- Class: Insecta
- Order: Lepidoptera
- Family: Cossidae
- Genus: Dyspessa
- Species: D. cyprica

Binomial name
- Dyspessa cyprica Rebel, 1927

Synonyms
- Dyspessa algeriensis cyprica Rebel, 1927; Dyspessa ulula cypriaca

Species of moth

Dyspessa cyprica is a species of moth of the family Cossidae. It is found in Azerbaijan and on Cyprus.
