= Dyspessa wiltshirei =

Scientific classification
- Kingdom: Animalia
- Phylum: Arthropoda
- Class: Insecta
- Order: Lepidoptera
- Family: Cossidae
- Genus: Dyspessa
- Species: D. wiltshirei

Binomial name
- Dyspessa wiltshirei Daniel, 1938

Species of moth

Dyspessa wiltshirei is a species of moth of the family Cossidae. It is found in Iraq and Lebanon.
