= Semagystia clathrata =

Scientific classification
- Domain: Eukaryota
- Kingdom: Animalia
- Phylum: Arthropoda
- Class: Insecta
- Order: Lepidoptera
- Family: Cossidae
- Genus: Semagystia
- Species: S. clathrata

Binomial name
- Semagystia clathrata (Christoph, 1884)

Synonyms
- Endagria clathrata Christoph, 1884; Dyspessa clathrata; Dyspessa clathrata albosignata Rothschild, 1912; Dyspessa clathrata pallida Rothschild, 1912

Species of moth

Semagystia clathrata is a moth in the family Cossidae. It was described by Hugo Theodor Christoph in 1884. It is found in Uzbekistan, Turkmenistan and Turkey.
