= Dyspessa pallida =

Scientific classification
- Kingdom: Animalia
- Phylum: Arthropoda
- Class: Insecta
- Order: Lepidoptera
- Family: Cossidae
- Genus: Dyspessa
- Species: D. pallida

Binomial name
- Dyspessa pallida Rothschild, 1912

Synonyms
- Dyspessa clathrata pallida Rothschild, 1912

Species of moth

Dyspessa pallida is a species of moth of the family Cossidae. It is found in Uzbekistan and Tajikistan.
