= Dyspessa wagneri =

Scientific classification
- Kingdom: Animalia
- Phylum: Arthropoda
- Class: Insecta
- Order: Lepidoptera
- Family: Cossidae
- Genus: Dyspessa
- Species: D. wagneri

Binomial name
- Dyspessa wagneri Schwingenschuss, 1939

Species of moth

Dyspessa wagneri is a species of moth of the family Cossidae. It is found in the Near East (Turkey, Iran) and Ukraine.
