= Cleonymia korbi =

Scientific classification
- Kingdom: Animalia
- Phylum: Arthropoda
- Clade: Pancrustacea
- Class: Insecta
- Order: Lepidoptera
- Superfamily: Noctuoidea
- Family: Noctuidae
- Genus: Cleonymia
- Species: C. korbi

Binomial name
- Cleonymia korbi (Staudinger, 1895)

Synonyms
- Cleophana korbi Staudinger, 1895; Cleonymia (Serryvania) korbi

Species of moth

Cleonymia korbi is a moth of the family Noctuidae. It is found in south-eastern Spain.

== Taxonomy ==
The species was long treated as a synonym of Cleonymia yvanii, but was reinstated as a valid species in 2010.
