= Dyspessa daralagezi =

Scientific classification
- Kingdom: Animalia
- Phylum: Arthropoda
- Clade: Pancrustacea
- Class: Insecta
- Order: Lepidoptera
- Family: Cossidae
- Genus: Dyspessa
- Species: D. daralagezi

Binomial name
- Dyspessa daralagezi Yakovlev, 2008

Species of moth

Dyspessa daralagezi is a species of moth of the family Cossidae. It is found in Armenia.
