= Dyspessa cerberus =

Scientific classification
- Kingdom: Animalia
- Phylum: Arthropoda
- Class: Insecta
- Order: Lepidoptera
- Family: Cossidae
- Genus: Dyspessa
- Species: D. cerberus

Binomial name
- Dyspessa cerberus Daniel, 1939

Synonyms
- Dyspessa pallidata cerberus Daniel, 1939; Dyspessa albinervis Kozhantchikov [manuscript name]

Species of moth

Dyspessa cerberus is a moth in the family Cossidae. It was described by Franz Daniel in 1939. It is found in Turkey and Syria.

The length of the forewings is 8–10 mm.

== Subspecies ==
- Dyspessa cerberus cerberus (Turkey)
- Dyspessa cerberus albinervis Yakovlev, 2008 (Syria)
