= Neostygia =

Scientific classification
- Kingdom: Animalia
- Phylum: Arthropoda
- Class: Insecta
- Order: Lepidoptera
- Family: Cossidae
- Subfamily: Stygiinae
- Genus: Neostygia; Wiltshire, 1980
- Species: N. postaurantia

Binomial name
- Neostygia postaurantia Wiltshire, 1980

Species of moth

Neostygia is a monotypic genus on the family Cossidae (subfamily Stygiinae ) (type species: Neostygia postaurantia Wiltshire, 1980 J. Oman Stud. Spec. Rep. 2: 190, pl.: fig. 1).
