= Semagystia tristis =

Scientific classification
- Domain: Eukaryota
- Kingdom: Animalia
- Phylum: Arthropoda
- Class: Insecta
- Order: Lepidoptera
- Family: Cossidae
- Genus: Semagystia
- Species: S. tristis

Binomial name
- Semagystia tristis (Bang-Haas, 1912)

Synonyms
- Dyspessa tristis A. Bang-Haas, 1912

Species of moth

Semagystia tristis is a moth in the family Cossidae. It was described by Andreas Bang-Haas in 1912. It is found in Turkmenistan (Karagai-tau), the Mongolian Altai, Kazakhstan, Tajikistan, Kirghizistan and Afghanistan.
