= Dyspessa curta =

Scientific classification
- Kingdom: Animalia
- Phylum: Arthropoda
- Class: Insecta
- Order: Lepidoptera
- Family: Cossidae
- Genus: Dyspessa
- Species: D. curta

Binomial name
- Dyspessa curta Rothschild, 1912

Species of moth

Dyspessa curta is a species of moth of the family Cossidae. It is found in Tajikistan.
