= Opsilia prasina =

Scientific classification
- Domain: Eukaryota
- Kingdom: Animalia
- Phylum: Arthropoda
- Class: Insecta
- Order: Coleoptera
- Suborder: Polyphaga
- Infraorder: Cucujiformia
- Family: Cerambycidae
- Genus: Opsilia
- Species: O. prasina

Binomial name
- Opsilia prasina Fuchs, 1971

Species of beetle

Opsilia prasina is a species of beetle from the family Cerambycidae found in Armenia, Azerbaijan, and Iran.
