= Dyspessa arabeska =

Scientific classification
- Kingdom: Animalia
- Phylum: Arthropoda
- Clade: Pancrustacea
- Class: Insecta
- Order: Lepidoptera
- Family: Cossidae
- Genus: Dyspessa
- Species: D. arabeska

Binomial name
- Dyspessa arabeska Yakovlev, 2005

Species of moth

Dyspessa arabeska is a species of moth of the family Cossidae. It is found in Turkey.

The length of the forewings is 8–10 mm in males. The forewings are light yellow and the hindwings are grey.
