= Semagystia lukhtanovi =

Scientific classification
- Kingdom: Animalia
- Phylum: Arthropoda
- Class: Insecta
- Order: Lepidoptera
- Family: Cossidae
- Genus: Semagystia
- Species: S. lukhtanovi

Binomial name
- Semagystia lukhtanovi Yakovlev, 2007

Species of moth

Semagystia lukhtanovi is a moth in the family Cossidae. It was described by Yakovlev in 2007. It is found in Tajikistan.

The length of the forewings is about 12 mm.
