= Dyspessa saldaitisi =

Scientific classification
- Kingdom: Animalia
- Phylum: Arthropoda
- Clade: Pancrustacea
- Class: Insecta
- Order: Lepidoptera
- Family: Cossidae
- Genus: Dyspessa
- Species: D. saldaitisi

Binomial name
- Dyspessa saldaitisi Yakovlev, 2011

Species of moth

Dyspessa saldaitisi is a species of moth of the family Cossidae. It is found in Mongolia.
