= Stygia mosulensis =

Scientific classification
- Domain: Eukaryota
- Kingdom: Animalia
- Phylum: Arthropoda
- Class: Insecta
- Order: Lepidoptera
- Family: Cossidae
- Genus: Stygia
- Species: S. mosulensis

Binomial name
- Stygia mosulensis Daniel, 1965

Species of moth

Stygia mosulensis is a species of moth of the family Cossidae. It is found in Bulgaria and Greece, as well as in Iraq and Iran.
