= Semagystia witti =

Scientific classification
- Kingdom: Animalia
- Phylum: Arthropoda
- Clade: Pancrustacea
- Class: Insecta
- Order: Lepidoptera
- Family: Cossidae
- Genus: Semagystia
- Species: S. witti

Binomial name
- Semagystia witti Yakovlev, 2007

Species of moth

Semagystia witti is a moth in the family Cossidae. It was described by Yakovlev in 2007. It is found in Afghanistan.

The length of the forewings is about 12 mm.
