= Dyspessa tyumasevae =

Scientific classification
- Kingdom: Animalia
- Phylum: Arthropoda
- Clade: Pancrustacea
- Class: Insecta
- Order: Lepidoptera
- Family: Cossidae
- Genus: Dyspessa
- Species: D. tyumasevae

Binomial name
- Dyspessa tyumasevae Yakovlev, 2008

Species of moth

Dyspessa tyumasevae is a moth in the family Cossidae. It was described by Yakovlev in 2008. It is found in Turkey.
