= Dyspessa marikowskyi =

Scientific classification
- Kingdom: Animalia
- Phylum: Arthropoda
- Clade: Pancrustacea
- Class: Insecta
- Order: Lepidoptera
- Family: Cossidae
- Genus: Dyspessa
- Species: D. marikowskyi

Binomial name
- Dyspessa marikowskyi Yakovlev, 2007

Species of moth

Dyspessa marikowskyi is a moth in the family Cossidae. It was described by Yakovlev in 2007. It is found in Kazakhstan.

The length of the forewings is about 10 mm.
