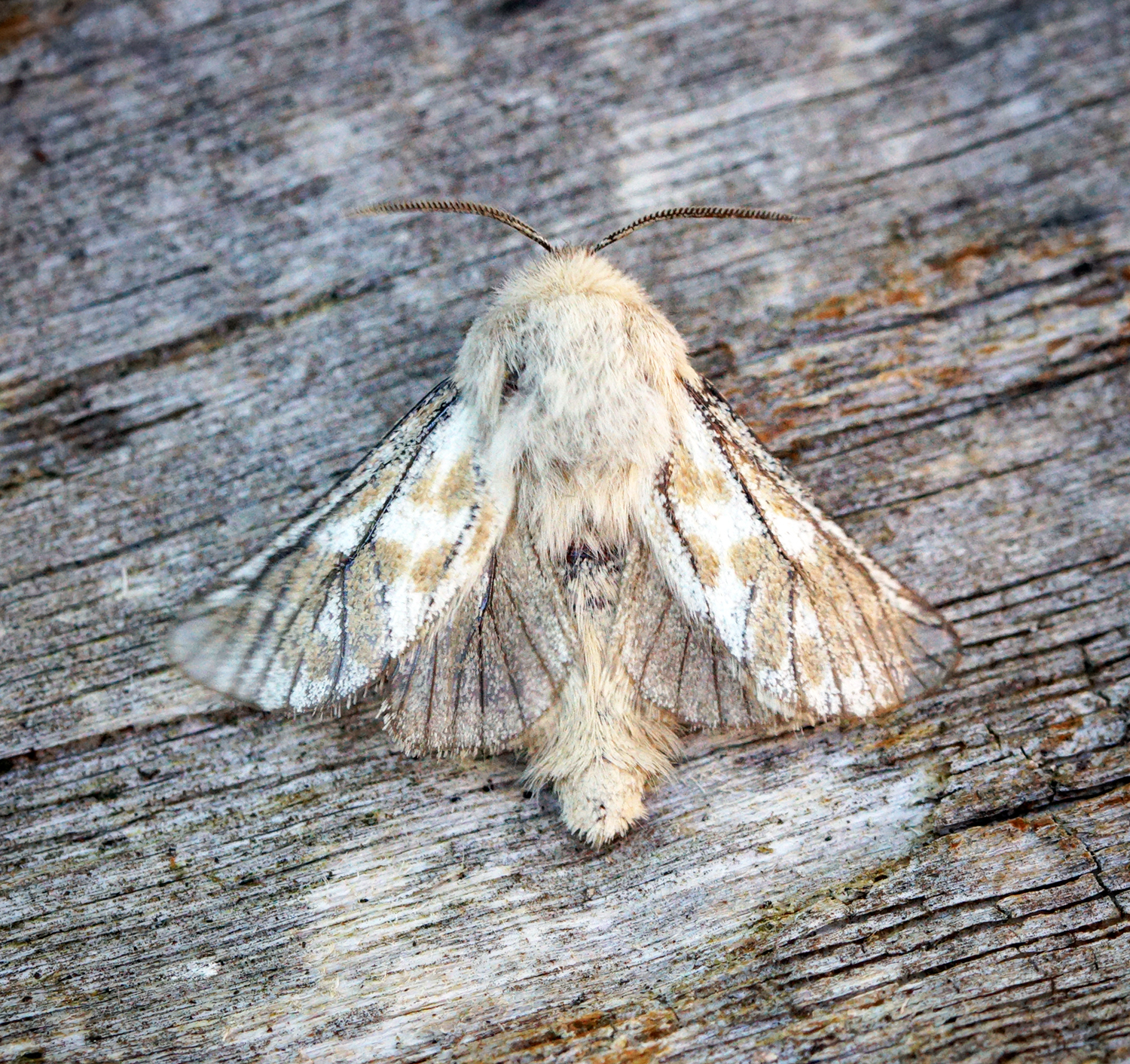
- Male

Scientific classification
- Kingdom: Animalia
- Phylum: Arthropoda
- Class: Insecta
- Order: Lepidoptera
- Family: Cossidae
- Genus: Dyspessa
- Species: D. ulula

Binomial name
- Dyspessa ulula (Borkhausen, 1790)

Synonyms
- Phalaena ulula Borkhausen, 1790; Bombyx hepialica Borkhausen, 1790; Bombyx hepialina Hübner, 1790; Dyspessa ulula kasrii Daniel, 1964; Bombyx pantherina Hübner, 1791; Dyspessa nigrita Wagner, 1931; Dyspessa ulula pallida Rothschild, 1917; Endagria marmorata Rambur, 1858

= Dyspessa ulula =

Species of moth

Dyspessa ulula, the garlic mottled, is a species of moth of the family Cossidae. It is found from central and southern Europe through Russia to central Asia. It is also found in Syria, Iran, Iraq and parts of North Africa.

The larvae feed on Allium species, including Allium flavum, Allium vienale, Allium spaerocephalon and Allium sativum. Development of the larvae takes multiple years.

== Features ==
Both sexes are of similar sizes. The wingspan is 18–25 mm for females and 19–26 mm for males. On the forewings, whitish spots of varying degrees can be seen. The apex is relatively pointed and the fringes are piebald. The hind wings are light ochre to yellow-gray or brownish in color. The antennae of the males are briefly double comb-toothed, those of the females are thickened and very short, comb-toothed. Thorax and abdomen are covered by pale gray scales. The females have a slightly longer abdomen with a protruding laying tube.

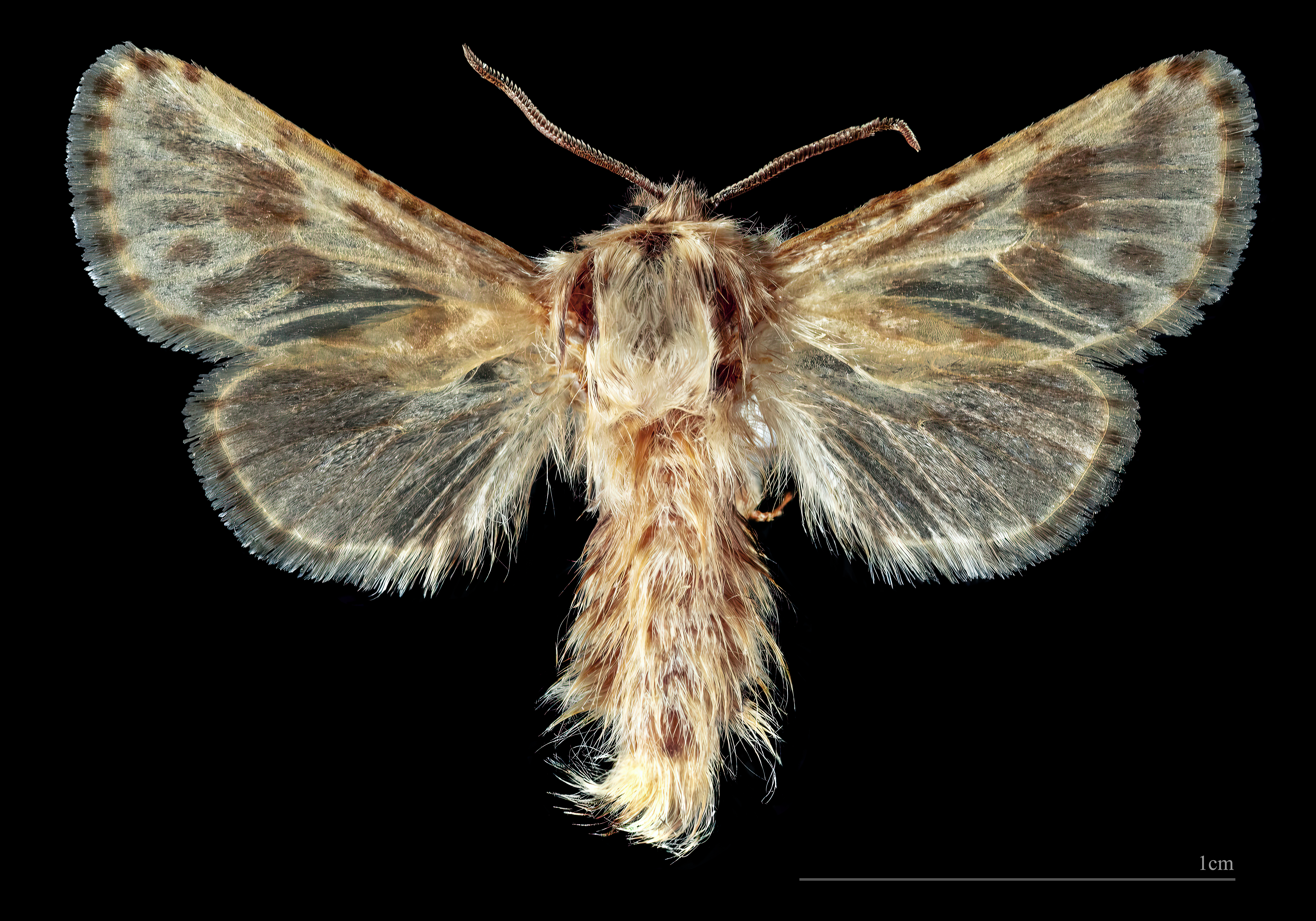
♂

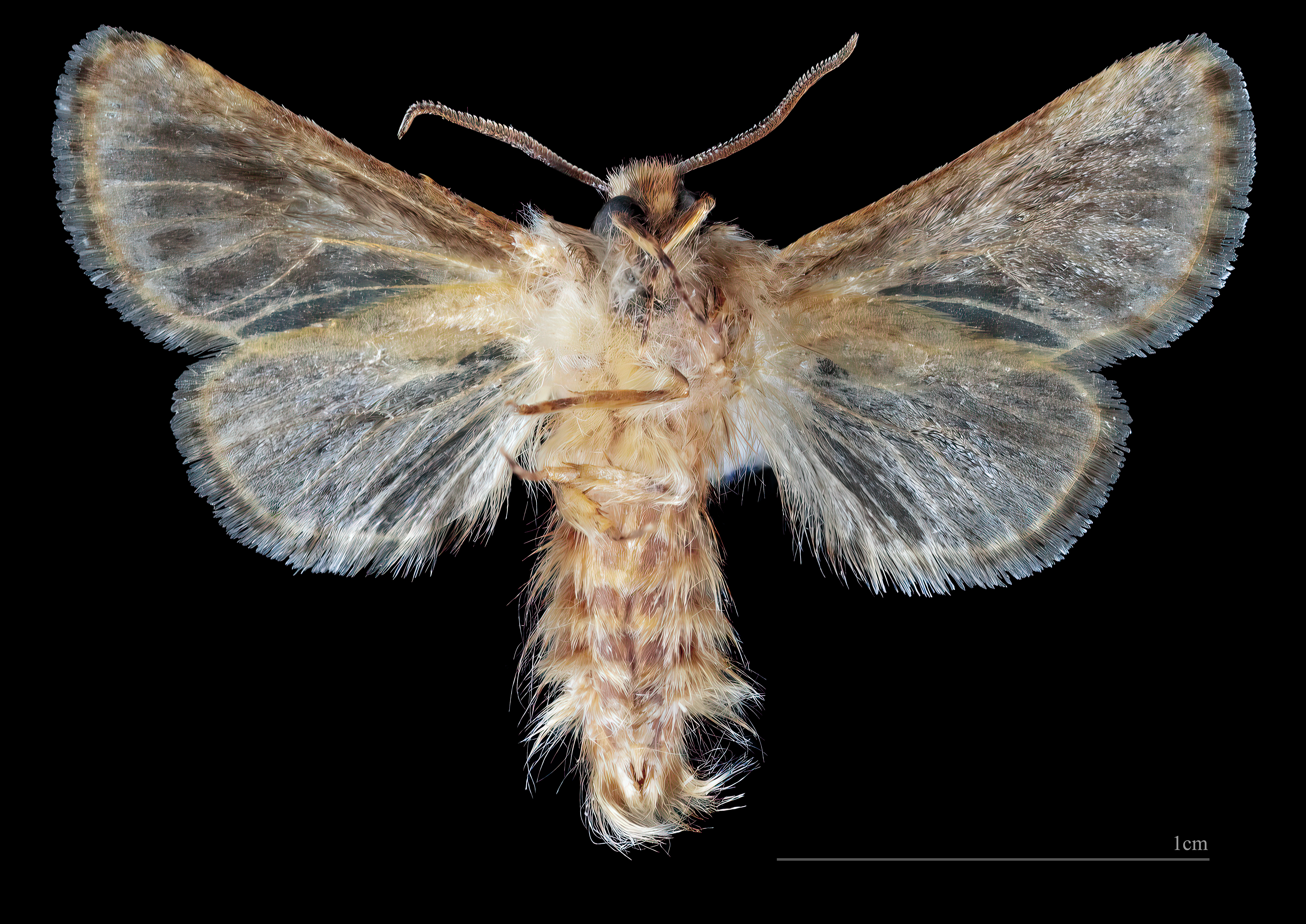
♂ △

== Subspecies ==
D. ulula has three subspecies, namely:

- Dyspessa ulula ulula
- Dyspessa ulula kasrii Daniel, 1964 (Iran)
- Dyspessa ulula nigrita Wagner, 1931 (Asia Minor)

== Endangerment ==
In Germany, the zwiebelbohrer is only found in a few regions. The species is classified in category 2 on the Red List of Threatened Species.
