= Semagystia monticola =

Scientific classification
- Domain: Eukaryota
- Kingdom: Animalia
- Phylum: Arthropoda
- Class: Insecta
- Order: Lepidoptera
- Family: Cossidae
- Genus: Semagystia
- Species: S. monticola

Binomial name
- Semagystia monticola (Grum-Grshimailo, 1890)

Synonyms
- Endagria monticola Grum-Grshimailo, 1890; Dyspessa monticola

Species of moth

Semagystia monticola is a moth in the family Cossidae. It was described by Grigory Grum-Grshimailo in 1890. It is found in Uzbekistan, Afghanistan, Kirghizistan and Tajikistan.
