= Dyspessa suavis =

Scientific classification
- Kingdom: Animalia
- Phylum: Arthropoda
- Class: Insecta
- Order: Lepidoptera
- Family: Cossidae
- Genus: Dyspessa
- Species: D. suavis

Binomial name
- Dyspessa suavis (Staudinger, 1900)

Synonyms
- Eudagria jordana var. suavis Staudinger, 1900

Species of moth

Dyspessa suavis is a species of moth of the family Cossidae. It was described by Staudinger in 1900. It is found in North Africa, including Algeria and Mauritania.
