= Dyspessa rothschildi =

Scientific classification
- Kingdom: Animalia
- Phylum: Arthropoda
- Clade: Pancrustacea
- Class: Insecta
- Order: Lepidoptera
- Family: Cossidae
- Genus: Dyspessa
- Species: D. rothschildi

Binomial name
- Dyspessa rothschildi Yakovlev, 2011

Synonyms
- Dyspessa ulula pallida Rothschild, 1917 (preocc.)

Species of moth

Dyspessa rothschildi is a species of moth of the family Cossidae. It is found in Algeria.
