= Opsilia varentzovi =

Scientific classification
- Domain: Eukaryota
- Kingdom: Animalia
- Phylum: Arthropoda
- Class: Insecta
- Order: Coleoptera
- Suborder: Polyphaga
- Infraorder: Cucujiformia
- Family: Cerambycidae
- Genus: Opsilia
- Species: O. varentzovi

Binomial name
- Opsilia varentzovi Semenov-Tian-Shanskij, 1896

Species of beetle

Opsilia varentzovi is a species of beetle from the family Cerambycidae found in Caucassus, Iran, and South Caucasus.
