= Dyspessa elbursensis =

Scientific classification
- Kingdom: Animalia
- Phylum: Arthropoda
- Class: Insecta
- Order: Lepidoptera
- Family: Cossidae
- Genus: Dyspessa
- Species: D. elbursensis

Binomial name
- Dyspessa elbursensis Daniel, 1964

Species of moth

Dyspessa elbursensis is a species of moth of the family Cossidae. It is found in Iran.

== Subspecies ==
- Dyspessa elbursensis elbursensis (northern Iran)
- Dyspessa elbursensis derbenti Daniel, 1964 (Iran)
