= Dyspessa albosignata =

Scientific classification
- Kingdom: Animalia
- Phylum: Arthropoda
- Class: Insecta
- Order: Lepidoptera
- Family: Cossidae
- Genus: Dyspessa
- Species: D. albosignata

Binomial name
- Dyspessa albosignata Rothschild, 1912

Synonyms
- Dyspessa clathrata albosignata Rothschild, 1912

Species of moth

Dyspessa albosignata is a species of moth of the family Cossidae. It was described by Rothschild in 1912. It is found in Transcaspia, where it has been recorded from Turkmenistan and southern Iran.
