= Dyspessa emilia =

Scientific classification
- Kingdom: Animalia
- Phylum: Arthropoda
- Class: Insecta
- Order: Lepidoptera
- Family: Cossidae
- Genus: Dyspessa
- Species: D. emilia

Binomial name
- Dyspessa emilia (Staudinger, 1878)

Synonyms
- Endagria emilia Staudinger, 1878

Species of moth

Dyspessa emilia is a species of moth of the family Cossidae. It was described by Staudinger in 1878. It is found in Turkey.
