= Semagystia dubatolovi =

Scientific classification
- Kingdom: Animalia
- Phylum: Arthropoda
- Clade: Pancrustacea
- Class: Insecta
- Order: Lepidoptera
- Family: Cossidae
- Genus: Semagystia
- Species: S. dubatolovi

Binomial name
- Semagystia dubatolovi Yakovlev, 2007

Species of moth

Semagystia dubatolovi is a moth in the family Cossidae. It was described by Yakovlev in 2007. It is found in Turkmenistan and Uzbekistan.

The length of the forewings is 12–14 mm. The forewings are grey.
