= Opsilia irakensis =

Scientific classification
- Kingdom: Animalia
- Phylum: Arthropoda
- Class: Insecta
- Order: Coleoptera
- Suborder: Polyphaga
- Infraorder: Cucujiformia
- Family: Cerambycidae
- Genus: Opsilia
- Species: O. irakensis

Binomial name
- Opsilia irakensis Breuning, 1967

Species of beetle

Opsilia irakensis is a species of beetle from the family Cerambycidae native to Iraq.
