= Dyspessa karatavica =

Scientific classification
- Kingdom: Animalia
- Phylum: Arthropoda
- Clade: Pancrustacea
- Class: Insecta
- Order: Lepidoptera
- Family: Cossidae
- Genus: Dyspessa
- Species: D. karatavica

Binomial name
- Dyspessa karatavica Yakovlev, 2007

Species of moth

Dyspessa karatavica is a moth in the family Cossidae. It was described by Yakovlev in 2007. It is found in Kazakhstan.

The length of the forewings is 10 mm for males and 10–12 mm for females.
