= Dyspessa syrtica =

Scientific classification
- Kingdom: Animalia
- Phylum: Arthropoda
- Class: Insecta
- Order: Lepidoptera
- Family: Cossidae
- Genus: Dyspessa
- Species: D. syrtica

Binomial name
- Dyspessa syrtica Kruger, 1932

Synonyms
- Dyspessa turbinans syrtica Kruger, 1932

Species of moth

Dyspessa seravoka is a species of moth of the family Cossidae. It is found in Libya.
