= Dyspessa aphrodite =

Scientific classification
- Kingdom: Animalia
- Phylum: Arthropoda
- Clade: Pancrustacea
- Class: Insecta
- Order: Lepidoptera
- Family: Cossidae
- Genus: Dyspessa
- Species: D. aphrodite

Binomial name
- Dyspessa aphrodite Yakovlev & Witt, 2007

Species of moth

Dyspessa aphrodite is a species of moth of the family Cossidae. It is found in the Peloponnese region of southern Greece.

== Description ==
The length of the forewings is 9–10 mm.

== Etymology ==
The species is named for Aphrodite, the goddess of love and beauty in Greek mythology.
