= Semagystia pljustchi =

Scientific classification
- Kingdom: Animalia
- Phylum: Arthropoda
- Clade: Pancrustacea
- Class: Insecta
- Order: Lepidoptera
- Family: Cossidae
- Genus: Semagystia
- Species: S. pljustchi

Binomial name
- Semagystia pljustchi Yakovlev, 2007

Species of moth

Semagystia pljustchi is a moth in the family Cossidae. It was described by Yakovlev in 2007. It is found in Kazakhstan and Kyrgyzstan.

The length of the forewings is 11–14 mm.
