= Semagystia enigma =

Scientific classification
- Kingdom: Animalia
- Phylum: Arthropoda
- Clade: Pancrustacea
- Class: Insecta
- Order: Lepidoptera
- Family: Cossidae
- Genus: Semagystia
- Species: S. enigma

Binomial name
- Semagystia enigma Yakovlev, 2007

Species of moth

Semagystia enigma is a moth in the family Cossidae. It was described by Yakovlev in 2007. It is found in Turkey.

The length of the forewings is about 13.5 mm.
