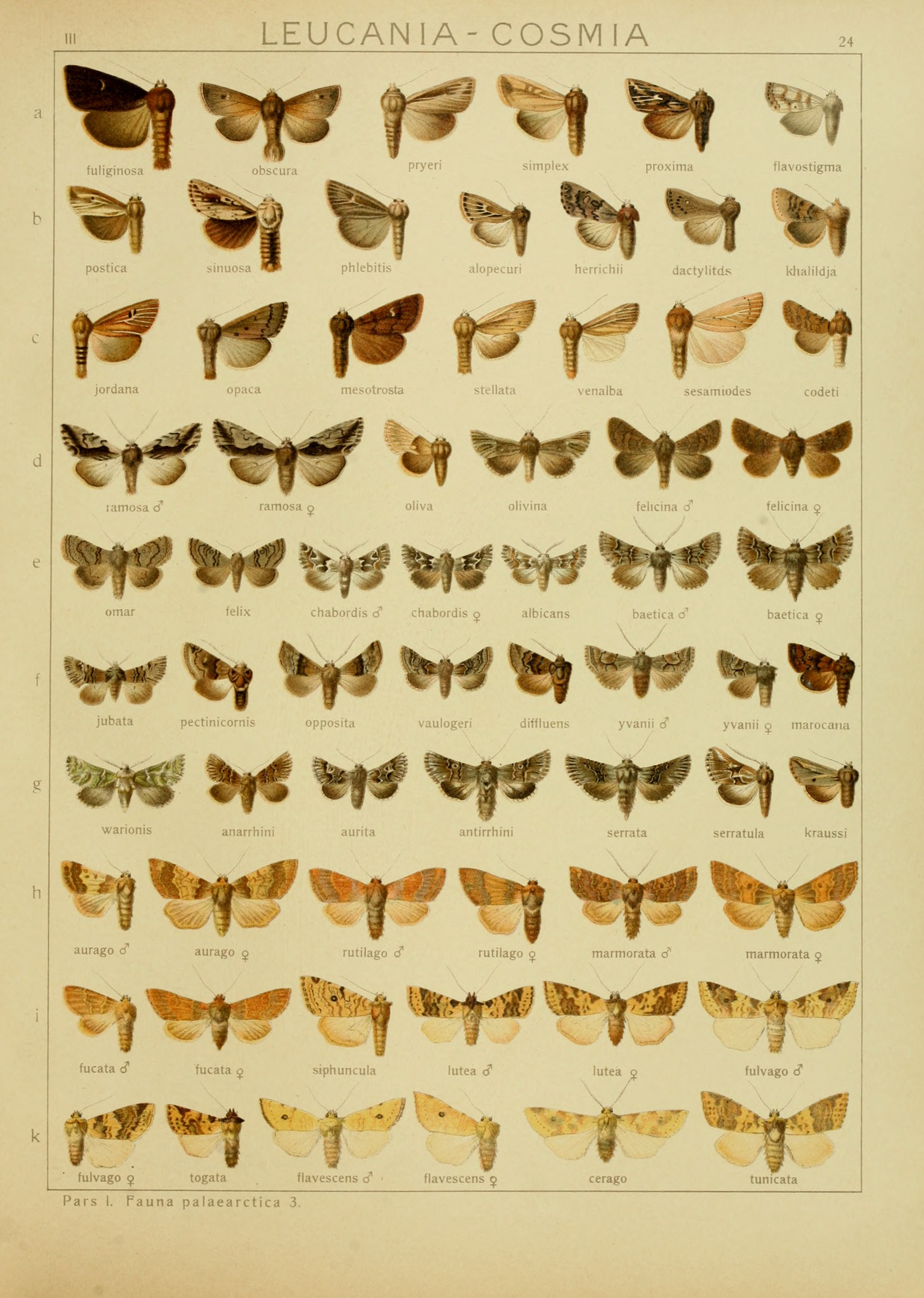

Scientific classification
- Domain: Eukaryota
- Kingdom: Animalia
- Phylum: Arthropoda
- Class: Insecta
- Order: Lepidoptera
- Superfamily: Noctuoidea
- Family: Noctuidae
- Genus: Cleonymia
- Species: C. baetica

Binomial name
- Cleonymia baetica (Rambur, 1837)

= Cleonymia baetica =

Species of moth

Cleonymia baetica is a moth of the family Noctuidae. It is found from south-western Europe and North Africa, south-east Turkey, Iraq to southwest Iran, it is also known from Saudi Arabia, Jordan, Syria and Israel.

== Description ==
Warren (1914) states C. baetica Rmb. (= choenorrhini Dup., penicillata H. Sch.) (24 e). Forewing pale grey; inner and outer lines white, vertical, towards each other edged with black, and marked by black points on veins; the inner accompanied by a dark grey cloud; the outer followed by a rufous tinge; a black spot at base of median vein; orbicular a few white scales, reniform a prominent white lunule; a tuft of white scales in middle of submedian fold; veins towards termen broadly white, running out into the fringe; hindwing olive brownish, the veins darker basal half whitish; fringe mottled brown and white. Found only in S. Europe; S. E. France, Spain, Sardinia;Algeria; Asia Minor, Syria, Palestine, Georgia.Larva green with yellow dorsal, red lateral and spiracular lines; spiracles yellow ringed with dark; feeding on Helianthemum.

== Subspecies ==
- Cleonymia baetica baetica
- Cleonymia baetica klapperichi (Israel)

== Biology ==
Adults are on wing from March to April. There is one generation per year.

The larvae feed on Helianthemum species.
