= Dyspessa dueldueli =

Scientific classification
- Kingdom: Animalia
- Phylum: Arthropoda
- Class: Insecta
- Order: Lepidoptera
- Family: Cossidae
- Genus: Dyspessa
- Species: D. dueldueli

Binomial name
- Dyspessa dueldueli Daniel, 1939

Synonyms
- Dyspessa dulduli Daniel in Osthelder et Pfeiffer, 1939

Species of moth

Dyspessa dueldueli is a species of moth of the family Cossidae. It is found in Turkey and Libya.
