= Dyspessa zurvan =

Scientific classification
- Kingdom: Animalia
- Phylum: Arthropoda
- Clade: Pancrustacea
- Class: Insecta
- Order: Lepidoptera
- Family: Cossidae
- Genus: Dyspessa
- Species: D. zurvan

Binomial name
- Dyspessa zurvan Yakovlev, 2008

Species of moth

Dyspessa zurvan is a moth in the family Cossidae. It was described by Yakovlev in 2008. It is found in Iran.

The length of the forewings is 10–11 mm.

== Etymology ==
The species is named after Zurvan.
