= Opsilia transcaspica =

Scientific classification
- Domain: Eukaryota
- Kingdom: Animalia
- Phylum: Arthropoda
- Class: Insecta
- Order: Coleoptera
- Suborder: Polyphaga
- Infraorder: Cucujiformia
- Family: Cerambycidae
- Genus: Opsilia
- Species: O. transcaspica

Binomial name
- Opsilia transcaspica Fuchs, 1955

Species of beetle

Opsilia transcaspica is a species of beetle from the family Cerambycidae distributed in Central Asia.
