= Dyspessa rueckbeili =

Scientific classification
- Kingdom: Animalia
- Phylum: Arthropoda
- Clade: Pancrustacea
- Class: Insecta
- Order: Lepidoptera
- Family: Cossidae
- Genus: Dyspessa
- Species: D. rueckbeili

Binomial name
- Dyspessa rueckbeili Yakovlev, 2007

Species of moth

Dyspessa rueckbeili is a moth in the family Cossidae. It was described by Yakovlev in 2007. It is found in Central Asia.

The length of the forewings is about 9.5 mm. The forewings are brown with a dark brown border. The hindwings are brown.
