= Dyspessa infuscata =

Scientific classification
- Kingdom: Animalia
- Phylum: Arthropoda
- Class: Insecta
- Order: Lepidoptera
- Family: Cossidae
- Genus: Dyspessa
- Species: D. infuscata

Binomial name
- Dyspessa infuscata (Staudinger, 1892)

Synonyms
- Endagria infuscata Staudinger, 1892

Species of moth

Dyspessa infuscata is a species of moth of the family Cossidae. It is found in Russia, Ukraine and the Near East (Syria and Turkey).

The wingspan is 19–21 mm. The wings are uniform dark brownish grey.
