= Opsilia badenkoi =

Scientific classification
- Domain: Eukaryota
- Kingdom: Animalia
- Phylum: Arthropoda
- Class: Insecta
- Order: Coleoptera
- Suborder: Polyphaga
- Infraorder: Cucujiformia
- Family: Cerambycidae
- Genus: Opsilia
- Species: O. badenkoi

Binomial name
- Opsilia badenkoi Danilevsky, 1988

Species of beetle

Opsilia badenkoi is a species of beetle from the family Cerambycidae native to Kazakhstan.
