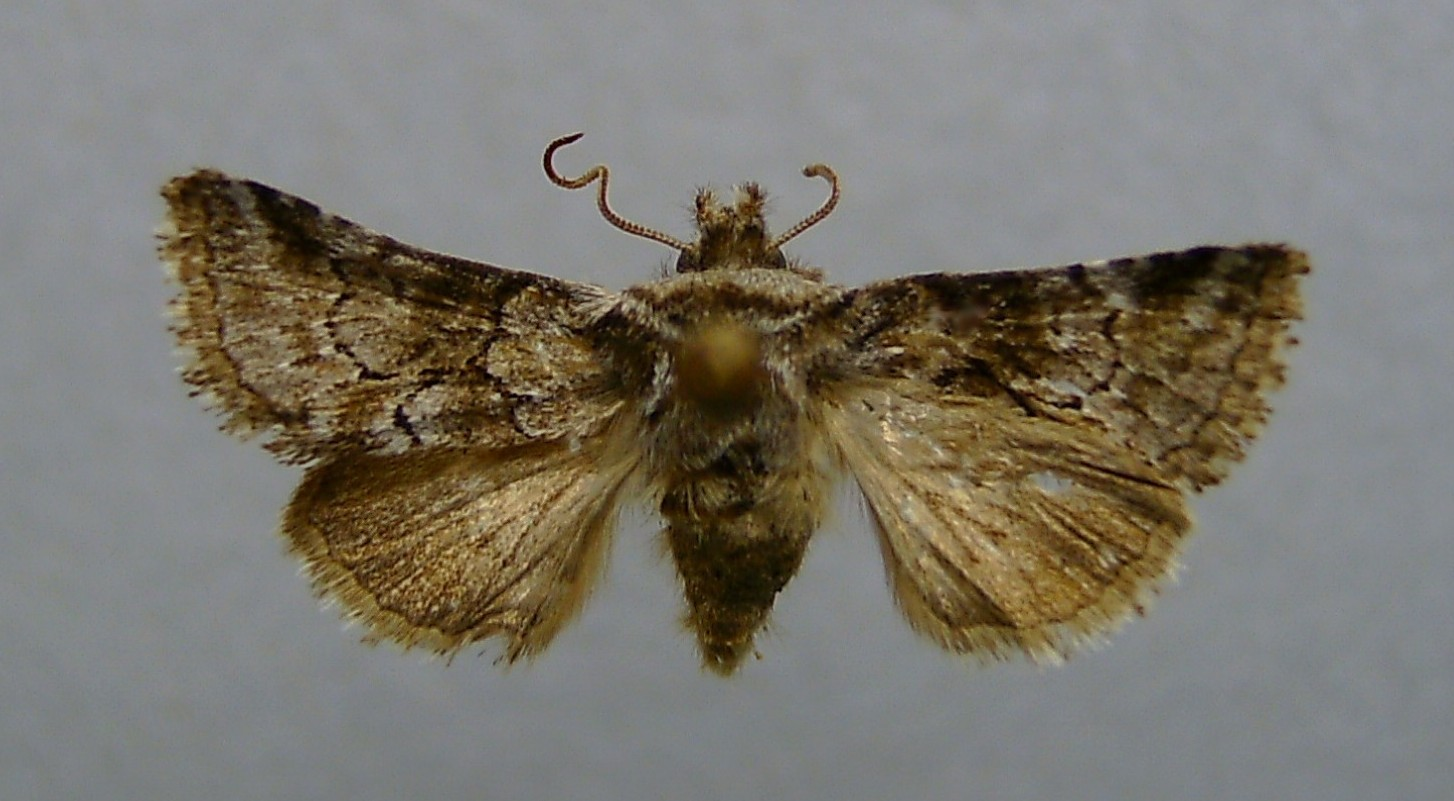

Scientific classification
- Domain: Eukaryota
- Kingdom: Animalia
- Phylum: Arthropoda
- Class: Insecta
- Order: Lepidoptera
- Superfamily: Noctuoidea
- Family: Noctuidae
- Genus: Cleonymia
- Species: C. yvanii

Binomial name
- Cleonymia yvanii (Duponchel, 1833)

Synonyms
- Xylina yvanii Duponchel, 1833; Cleophana mauretaniae Rothschild, 1920

= Cleonymia yvanii =

Species of moth

Cleonymia yvanii is a moth of the family Noctuidae first described by Philogène Auguste Joseph Duponchel in 1833. It is found in Portugal, north-eastern Spain, southern France and north-eastern Italy.

The wingspan is 18–25 mm.

== Description ==
Adults are variable in colour, ranging from ochre to greyish brown. Warren (1914) states C. yvanii Dup. (24 f). Much like vaulogeri Stgr.,[Cleonymia vaulogeri (Staudinger, 1899)] the inner and outer lines similarly incurved and connected on submedian fold; orbicular and reniform stigmata very small, with fuscous centres and greyish annuli, separated by a diffuse brown median shade; submarginal line grey, obscure, whitish and oblique at costa; fringe brown in basal half, chequered in outer; hindwing fuscous, the base paler;—korbi Stgr.[ now species Cleonymia korbi] is paler, without the black streak in base of cell of forewing. S. France and Spain. Larva yellowish white, the lateral lines red, the dorsal line dark, interrupted; feeding on seeds of Helianthemum.

== Biology ==
Adults are on wing from the end of April to mid-July in one generation per year.

The larvae feed on Helianthemum species. They can be found in late summer. The species overwinters in the pupal stage.
