= Dyspessa manas =

Scientific classification
- Kingdom: Animalia
- Phylum: Arthropoda
- Clade: Pancrustacea
- Class: Insecta
- Order: Lepidoptera
- Family: Cossidae
- Genus: Dyspessa
- Species: D. manas

Binomial name
- Dyspessa manas Yakovlev, 2007

Species of moth

Dyspessa manas is a moth in the family Cossidae. It was described by Yakovlev in 2007. It is found in Kyrgyzstan.

The length of the forewings is 10–11 mm.
