= Opsilia schurmanni =

Scientific classification
- Domain: Eukaryota
- Kingdom: Animalia
- Phylum: Arthropoda
- Class: Insecta
- Order: Coleoptera
- Suborder: Polyphaga
- Infraorder: Cucujiformia
- Family: Cerambycidae
- Genus: Opsilia
- Species: O. schurmanni

Binomial name
- Opsilia schurmanni Fuchs, 1971

Synonyms
- Phytoecia schurmanni Fuchs, 1971

Species of beetle

Opsilia schurmanni is a species of beetle from the family Cerambycidae that is endemic to North Macedonia.
