= Cleonymia opposita =

Scientific classification
- Domain: Eukaryota
- Kingdom: Animalia
- Phylum: Arthropoda
- Class: Insecta
- Order: Lepidoptera
- Superfamily: Noctuoidea
- Family: Noctuidae
- Genus: Cleonymia
- Species: C. opposita

Binomial name
- Cleonymia opposita (Lederer, 1870)

Synonyms
- Cleonymia opposia

Species of moth

Cleonymia opposita is a moth of the family Noctuidae first described by Julius Lederer in 1870. It is widespread in Asia Minor, expanding northwards to the Armenian-Caucasian Region, eastward to Iraq.

Adults are on wing from March to April. There is one generation per year.
