= Opsilia bucharica =

Scientific classification
- Kingdom: Animalia
- Phylum: Arthropoda
- Class: Insecta
- Order: Coleoptera
- Suborder: Polyphaga
- Infraorder: Cucujiformia
- Family: Cerambycidae
- Genus: Opsilia
- Species: O. bucharica

Binomial name
- Opsilia bucharica Breuning, 1943

Species of beetle

Opsilia bucharica is a species of beetle from the family Cerambycidae found in Tajikistan and Uzbekistan.
