= Dyspessa pallidata =

Scientific classification
- Kingdom: Animalia
- Phylum: Arthropoda
- Class: Insecta
- Order: Lepidoptera
- Family: Cossidae
- Genus: Dyspessa
- Species: D. pallidata

Binomial name
- Dyspessa pallidata (Staudinger, 1892)

Synonyms
- Endagria fuscula ab. palliata Staudinger, 1892

Species of moth

Dyspessa pallidata is a species of moth of the family Cossidae. It is found in Transcaucasia, the Caucasus, Turkey, Iran, Jordan, Israel and northern Egypt.

Adults have been recorded on wing from May to September in Israel.

The larvae probably feed on Allium species.
