= Semagystia agilis =

Scientific classification
- Domain: Eukaryota
- Kingdom: Animalia
- Phylum: Arthropoda
- Class: Insecta
- Order: Lepidoptera
- Family: Cossidae
- Genus: Semagystia
- Species: S. agilis

Binomial name
- Semagystia agilis (Christoph, 1884)

Synonyms
- Endagria agilis Christoph, 1884; Dyspessa agilis; Dyspessa magna Seitz, 1912

Species of moth

Semagystia agilis is a moth in the family Cossidae. It was described by Hugo Theodor Christoph in 1884. It is found in Uzbekistan, Turkmenistan, Afghanistan and Iran.
