= Dyspessa argaeensis =

Scientific classification
- Kingdom: Animalia
- Phylum: Arthropoda
- Class: Insecta
- Order: Lepidoptera
- Family: Cossidae
- Genus: Dyspessa
- Species: D. argaeensis

Binomial name
- Dyspessa argaeensis Rebel, 1905

Species of moth

Dyspessa argaeensis is a species of moth of the family Cossidae. It is found in Turkey.
