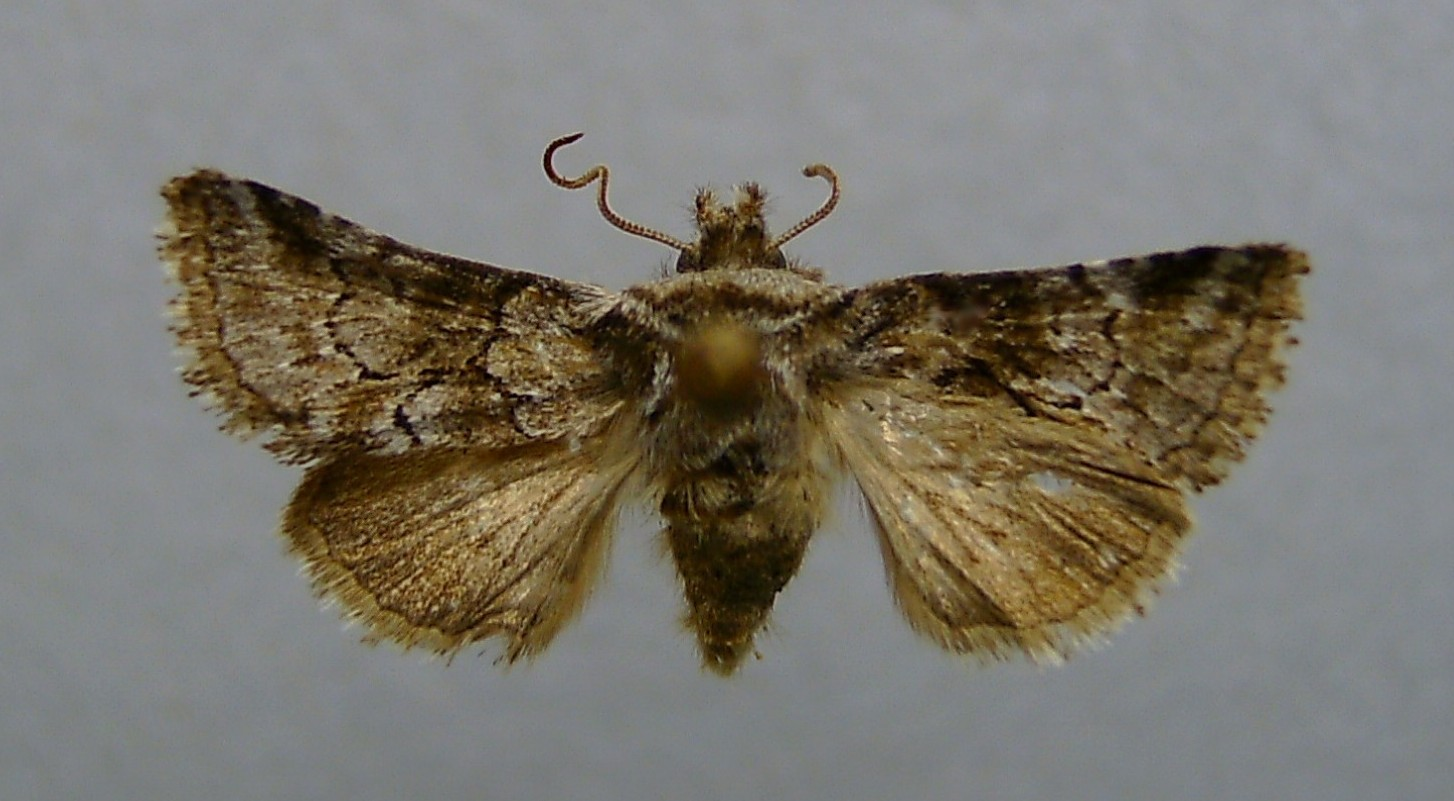
- Cleonymia yvanii

Scientific classification
- Domain: Eukaryota
- Kingdom: Animalia
- Phylum: Arthropoda
- Class: Insecta
- Order: Lepidoptera
- Superfamily: Noctuoidea
- Family: Noctuidae
- Subfamily: Cuculliinae
- Genus: Cleonymia; Berio, 1966

Synonyms
- Serryvania Berio, 1980; Ronkayana Fibiger & Hacker, 1991

= Cleonymia =

Genus of moths

Cleonymia is a genus of moths of the family Noctuidae.

== Species ==
- Cleonymia affinis (Rothschild, 1920)
- Cleonymia baetica (Rambur, 1837)
- Cleonymia chabordis (Oberthür, 1876)
- Cleonymia diffluens (Staudinger, 1870)
- Cleonymia fatima (A. Bang-Haas, 1907)
- Cleonymia jubata (Oberthür, 1890)
- Cleonymia korbi (Staudinger, 1895)
- Cleonymia marocana (Staudinger, 1901)
- Cleonymia opposita (Lederer, 1870)
- Cleonymia pectinicornis (Staudinger, 1859)
- Cleonymia vaulogeri (Staudinger, 1899)
- Cleonymia versicolor (Rothschild, 1920)
- Cleonymia warionis (Oberthür, 1876)
- Cleonymia yvanii (Duponchel, 1833)
