= Dyspessa kostjuki =

Scientific classification
- Kingdom: Animalia
- Phylum: Arthropoda
- Clade: Pancrustacea
- Class: Insecta
- Order: Lepidoptera
- Family: Cossidae
- Genus: Dyspessa
- Species: D. kostjuki

Binomial name
- Dyspessa kostjuki Yakovlev, 2005

Species of moth

Dyspessa kostjuki is a species of moth of the family Cossidae. It is found in Russia and Ukraine.

The length of the forewings is 9–12 mm in males and about 11 mm in females.
