= Semagystia cuhensis =

Scientific classification
- Domain: Eukaryota
- Kingdom: Animalia
- Phylum: Arthropoda
- Class: Insecta
- Order: Lepidoptera
- Family: Cossidae
- Genus: Semagystia
- Species: S. cuhensis

Binomial name
- Semagystia cuhensis de Freina, 1994

Species of moth

Semagystia cuhensis is a moth in the family Cossidae. It was described by Josef J. de Freina in 1994. It is found in Turkey and Transcaucasia.
