= Semagystia tsimgana =

Scientific classification
- Kingdom: Animalia
- Phylum: Arthropoda
- Class: Insecta
- Order: Lepidoptera
- Family: Cossidae
- Genus: Semagystia
- Species: S. tsimgana

Binomial name
- Semagystia tsimgana (Zukowsky, 1936)

Synonyms
- Dyspessa tsimgana Zukowsky, 1936

Species of moth

Semagystia tsimgana is a moth in the family Cossidae. It was described by Zukowsky in 1936. It is found in Uzbekistan and the western Tian-Shan.
