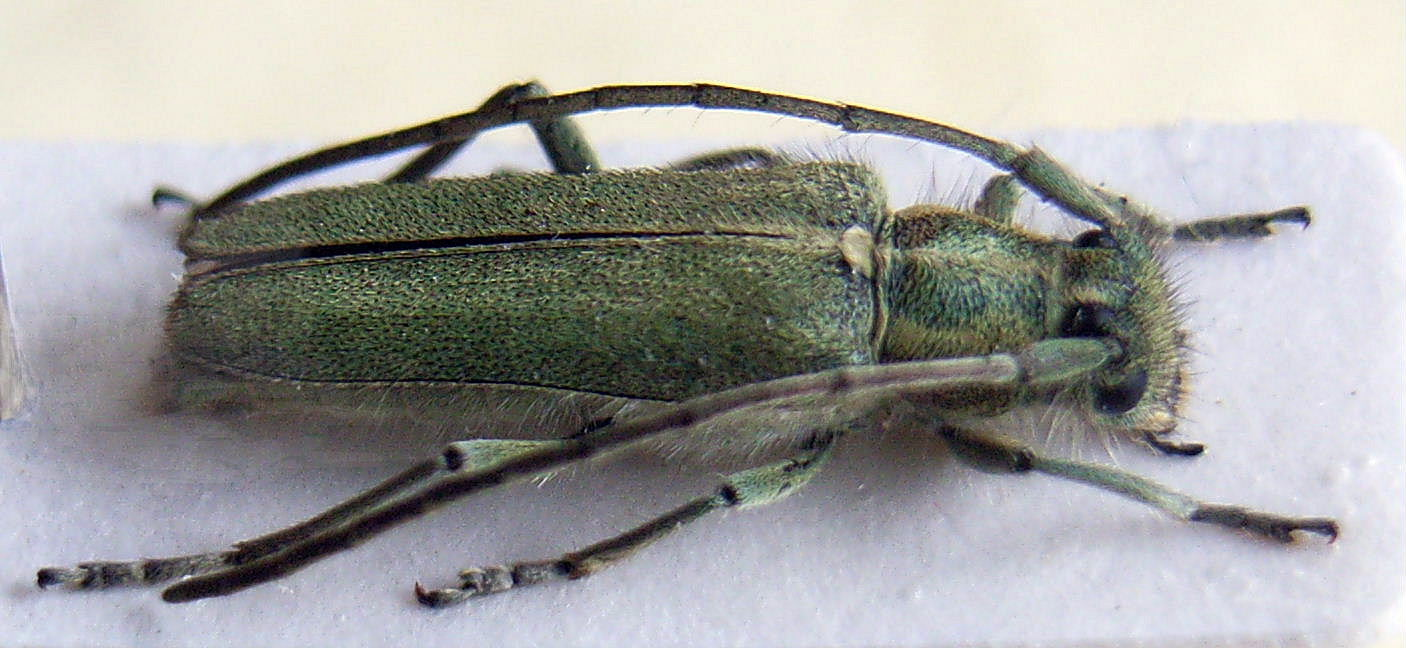
- Opsilia coerulescens

Scientific classification
- Kingdom: Animalia
- Phylum: Arthropoda
- Class: Insecta
- Order: Coleoptera
- Suborder: Polyphaga
- Infraorder: Cucujiformia
- Family: Cerambycidae
- Subfamily: Lamiinae
- Genus: Opsilia; Mulsant, 1863

= Opsilia =

Genus of beetles

Opsilia is a genus of beetles in the family Cerambycidae. It is listed as a subgenus of Phytoecia by some sources.

== Species ==
- Opsilia aspericollis (Holzschuh, 1981)
- Opsilia badenkoi (Danilevsky, 1988)
- Opsilia bucharica (Breuning, 1943)
- Opsilia chinensis (Breuning, 1943)
- Opsilia coerulescens (Scopoli, 1763)
- Opsilia irakensis Breuning, 1967
- Opsilia longitarsis (Reitter, 1911)
- Opsilia malachitica (Lucas, 1849)
- Opsilia murzini Lazarev, 2025
- Opsilia molybdaena (Dalman, 1817)
- Opsilia prasina (Reitter, 1911)
- Opsilia schurmanni (Fuchs, 1971)
- Opsilia tenuilinea (Fairmaire, 1877)
- Opsilia transcaspica (Fuchs, 1955)
- Opsilia uncinata (W. Redtenbacher, 1842)
- Opsilia varentzovi (Semenov, 1896)
