= Semagystia cossoides =

Scientific classification
- Domain: Eukaryota
- Kingdom: Animalia
- Phylum: Arthropoda
- Class: Insecta
- Order: Lepidoptera
- Family: Cossidae
- Genus: Semagystia
- Species: S. cossoides

Binomial name
- Semagystia cossoides (Graeser, 1892)

Synonyms
- Endagria cossoides Graeser, 1892; Dyspessa cossoides

Species of moth

Semagystia cossoides is a moth in the family Cossidae. It was described by Ludwig Carl Friedrich Graeser in 1892. It is found in Kyrgyzstan, Tajikistan and Kazakhstan.
