= Dyspessa blonda =

Scientific classification
- Kingdom: Animalia
- Phylum: Arthropoda
- Clade: Pancrustacea
- Class: Insecta
- Order: Lepidoptera
- Family: Cossidae
- Genus: Dyspessa
- Species: D. blonda

Binomial name
- Dyspessa blonda Yakovlev, 2008

Species of moth

Dyspessa blonda is a moth in the family Cossidae. It was described by Yakovlev in 2008. It is found in Turkey.

The length of the forewings is 10–13 mm for males and 12–13 mm for females.
