= Dyspessa alipanahae =

Scientific classification
- Kingdom: Animalia
- Phylum: Arthropoda
- Clade: Pancrustacea
- Class: Insecta
- Order: Lepidoptera
- Family: Cossidae
- Genus: Dyspessa
- Species: D. alipanahae

Binomial name
- Dyspessa alipanahae Yakovlev, 2008

Species of moth

Dyspessa alipanahae is a moth in the family Cossidae. It was described by Yakovlev in 2008. It is found in Iran.

The length of the forewings is 11 mm for males and 12–14 mm for females.
