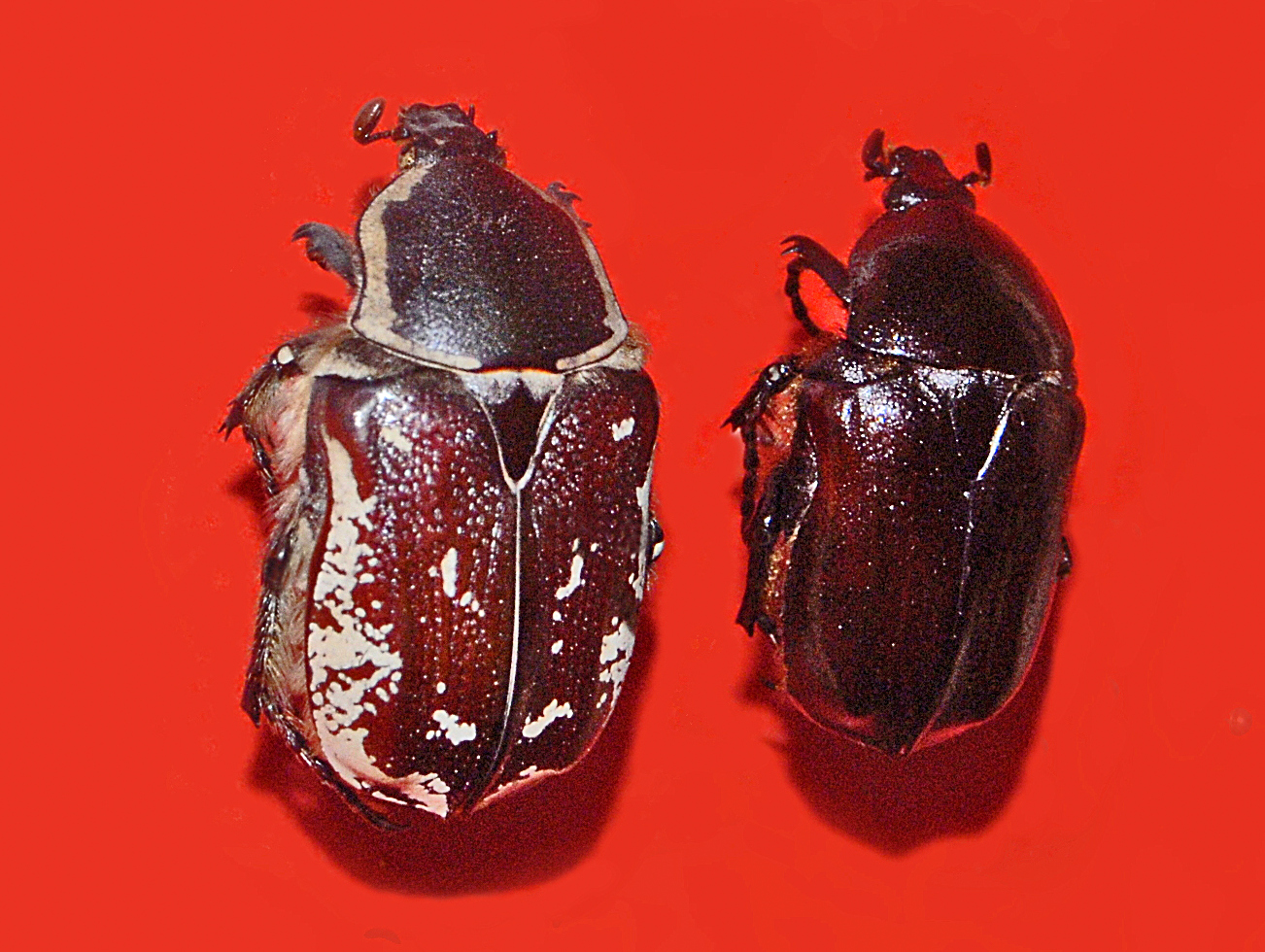
- Mounted specimen of Aethiessa floralis

Scientific classification
- Kingdom: Animalia
- Phylum: Arthropoda
- Class: Insecta
- Order: Coleoptera
- Suborder: Polyphaga
- Infraorder: Scarabaeiformia
- Family: Scarabaeidae
- Subfamily: Cetoniinae
- Genus: Aethiessa; Burmeister, 1842

= Aethiessa =

Genus of beetles

Aethiessa is a genus of beetles in the family Scarabaeidae and subfamily Cetoniinae.

== Species ==
- Aethiessa feralis Erichson, 1841
- Aethiessa floralis (Fabricius, 1787)
- Aethiessa inhumata (Gory & Percheron, 1833)
- Aethiessa martini Bedel, 1889
- Aethiessa mesopotamica Burmeister, 1842
- Aethiessa squamosa (Gory & Percheron, 1833)
- Aethiessa szekessyi Brasavola, 1939
- Aethiessa zarudnyi Kiserirzkij, 1939
