= Dyspessa serica =

Scientific classification
- Kingdom: Animalia
- Phylum: Arthropoda
- Class: Insecta
- Order: Lepidoptera
- Family: Cossidae
- Genus: Dyspessa
- Species: D. serica

Binomial name
- Dyspessa serica Brandt, 1938

Synonyms
- Dyspessa sericea Daniel, 1961

Species of moth

Dyspessa serica is a species of moth of the family Cossidae. It is found in Iran.
