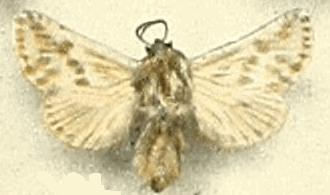

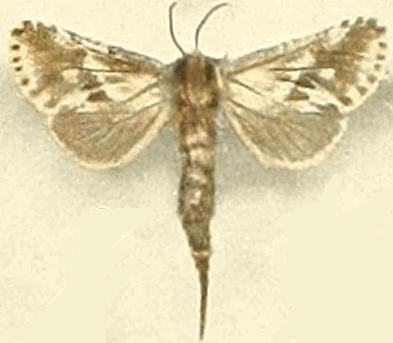

Scientific classification
- Kingdom: Animalia
- Phylum: Arthropoda
- Class: Insecta
- Order: Lepidoptera
- Family: Cossidae
- Genus: Dyspessa
- Species: D. aculeata

Binomial name
- Dyspessa aculeata Turati, 1909

= Dyspessa aculeata =

Species of moth

Dyspessa aculeata is a species of moth of the family Cossidae. It was described by Turati in 1909. It is found on Sicily.
