= Opsilia malachitica =

Scientific classification
- Kingdom: Animalia
- Phylum: Arthropoda
- Clade: Pancrustacea
- Class: Insecta
- Order: Coleoptera
- Suborder: Polyphaga
- Infraorder: Cucujiformia
- Family: Cerambycidae
- Genus: Opsilia
- Species: O. malachitica

Binomial name
- Opsilia malachitica (Lucas, 1849)

Species of beetle

Opsilia malachitica is a species of beetle from the family Cerambycidae found in Algeria, Spain, Morocco, Portugal, Sicily and Tunisia.
