= Cleonymia chabordis =

Scientific classification
- Domain: Eukaryota
- Kingdom: Animalia
- Phylum: Arthropoda
- Class: Insecta
- Order: Lepidoptera
- Superfamily: Noctuoidea
- Family: Noctuidae
- Genus: Cleonymia
- Species: C. chabordis

Binomial name
- Cleonymia chabordis (Oberthür, 1876)

Synonyms
- Cleophana chabordis Oberthür, 1876

Species of moth

Cleonymia chabordis is a moth of the family Noctuidae. The species was first described by Charles Oberthür in 1876. It is found in North Africa, the Near East and Middle East, the Arabian Peninsula, Iran, Jordan and Israel.

Adults are on wing from January to April. There is one generation per year.
