= Cleonymia pectinicornis =

Scientific classification
- Domain: Eukaryota
- Kingdom: Animalia
- Phylum: Arthropoda
- Class: Insecta
- Order: Lepidoptera
- Superfamily: Noctuoidea
- Family: Noctuidae
- Genus: Cleonymia
- Species: C. pectinicornis

Binomial name
- Cleonymia pectinicornis (Staudinger, 1859)

Species of moth

Cleonymia pectinicornis is a moth of the family Noctuidae first described by Otto Staudinger in 1859. It is found in southern Spain and throughout the northern African deserts and the Near East.

Adults are on wing from February to April. There is one generation per year.
