= Stygiinae =

Scientific classification
- Kingdom: Animalia
- Phylum: Arthropoda
- Clade: Pancrustacea
- Class: Insecta
- Order: Lepidoptera
- Family: Cossidae
- Subfamily: Stygiinae; Newman, 1832

Synonyms
- Stygiini Newman, 1832

Subfamily of moths

Stygiinae is a subfamily of the family Cossidae (carpenter or goat moths).

== Genera ==
- Neostygia Wiltshire, 1980
- Stygia Latreille, [1802]
