= Cleonymia warionis =

Scientific classification
- Domain: Eukaryota
- Kingdom: Animalia
- Phylum: Arthropoda
- Class: Insecta
- Order: Lepidoptera
- Superfamily: Noctuoidea
- Family: Noctuidae
- Genus: Cleonymia
- Species: C. warionis

Binomial name
- Cleonymia warionis (Oberthür, 1876)

Species of moth

Cleonymia warionis is a moth of the family Noctuidae first described by Charles Oberthür in 1876. It is known from localities in Algeria, Morocco, Libya and Israel.

Adults are on wing from January to March. There is one generation per year.
