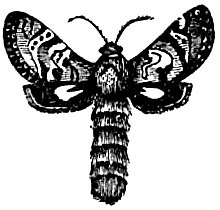
- Image of Stygia australis

Scientific classification
- Kingdom: Animalia
- Phylum: Arthropoda
- Class: Insecta
- Order: Lepidoptera
- Family: Cossidae
- Subfamily: Stygiinae
- Genus: Stygia; Latreille, 1802

Species
- See text

Synonyms
- Cryphia Meigen, 1830 (preocc.); Hyalida Sodoffsky, 1837

= Stygia (moth) =

Moth genus in family Cossidae

Stygia is a genus of moths belonging to the family Cossidae.

== Species ==
- Stygia australis Latreille, 1804
- Stygia hades Le Cerf, 1924
- Stygia mosulensis Daniel, 1965
- Stygia nilssoni Saldaitis & Yakovlev, 2008
