= Semagystia lacertula =

Scientific classification
- Domain: Eukaryota
- Kingdom: Animalia
- Phylum: Arthropoda
- Class: Insecta
- Order: Lepidoptera
- Family: Cossidae
- Genus: Semagystia
- Species: S. lacertula

Binomial name
- Semagystia lacertula (Staudinger, 1887)

Synonyms
- Endagria lacertula Staudinger, 1887; Dyspessa lacertula

Species of moth

Semagystia lacertula is a moth in the family Cossidae. It was described by Staudinger in 1887. It is found in Kyrgyzstan and Uzbekistan.
