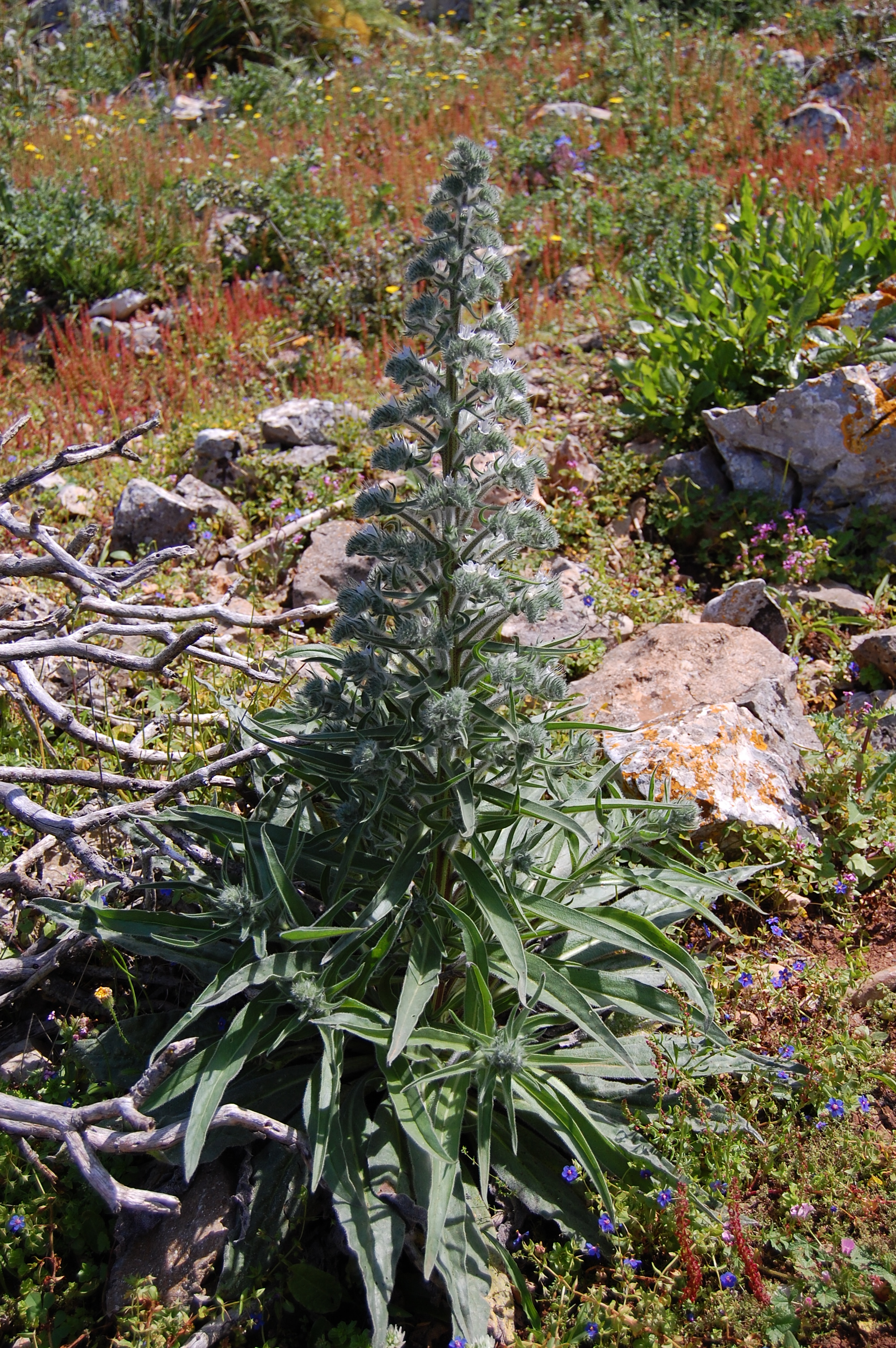

Scientific classification
- Kingdom: Plantae
- Clade: Tracheophytes
- Clade: Angiosperms
- Clade: Eudicots
- Clade: Asterids
- Order: Boraginales
- Family: Boraginaceae
- Genus: Echium
- Species: E. italicum

Binomial name
- Echium italicum L.

= Echium italicum =

Italian viper's bugloss

Species of flowering plant

Echium italicum, the Italian viper's bugloss, Lady Campbell weed, or pale bugloss, is a species of plant from the family Boraginaceae, found in the Mediterranean Basin (especially in Italy, hence the name 'italicum') and, as an introduced species in the United States (for example in the state of Maryland).

== Distribution ==
It is also found in North Africa, western Asia, Caucasus and Europe. It has naturalised in Australia.

== Gallery ==
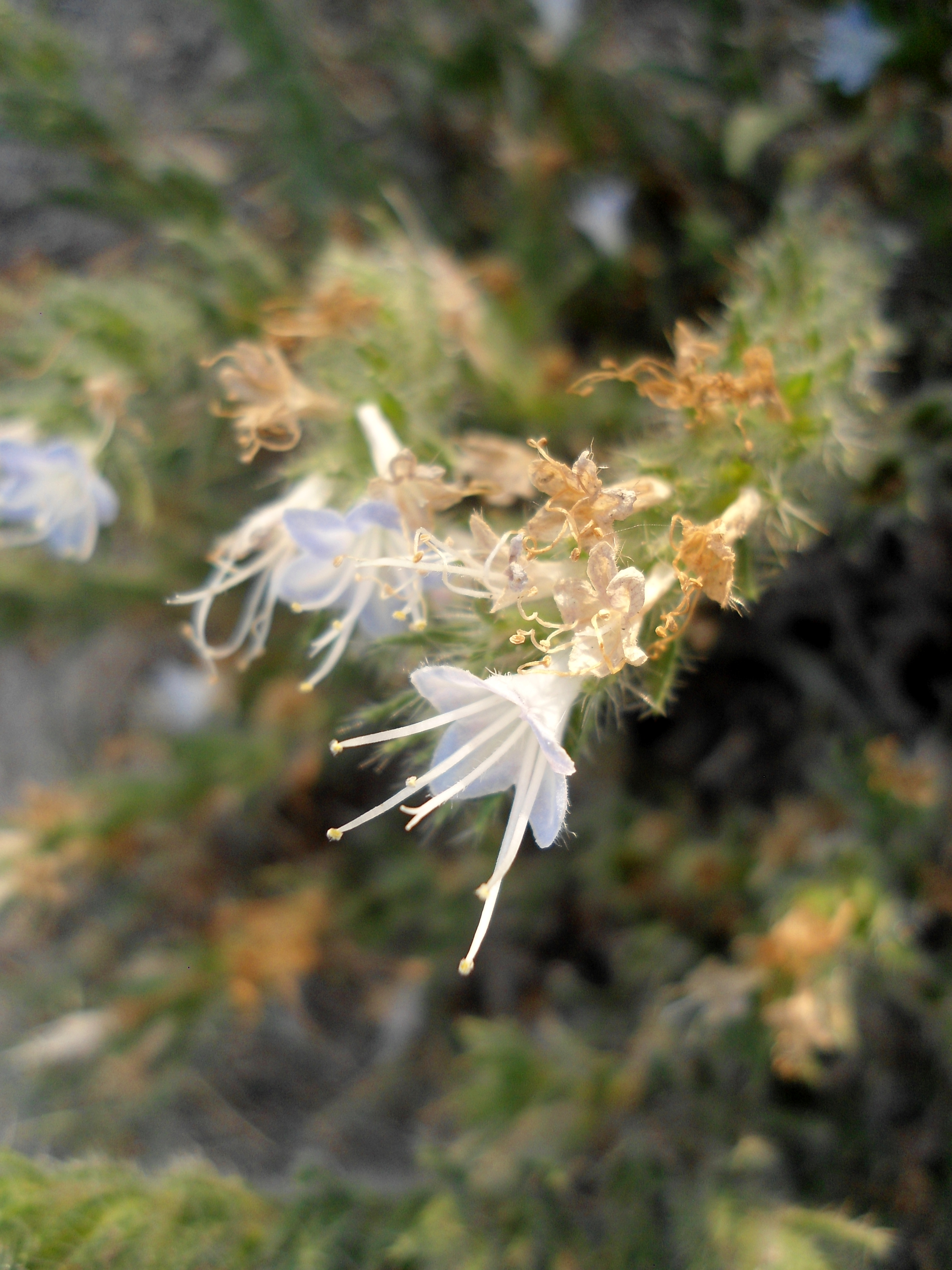
Flowers
