= Andreas Bang-Haas =

Danish entomologist

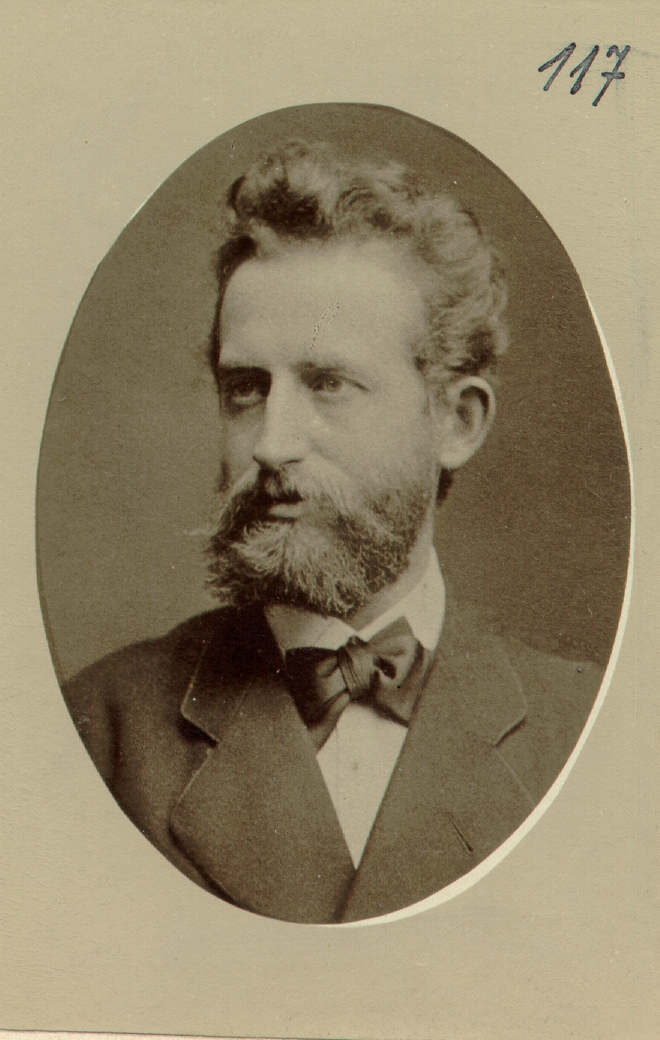
Andreas Bang-Haas

Andreas Bang-Haas (6 December 1846 – 7 February 1925) was a Danish entomologist and insect dealer.

Bang-Haas was born in Horsens. In 1879 he entered into the business of the insect dealer Otto Staudinger. He married Staudinger's daughter in 1880 and became co-owner of the firm, now "Staudinger & Bang-Haas", in 1884 or 1887. He died in Dresden, aged 78. The business was eventually taken over by his son Otto Bang-Haas.
