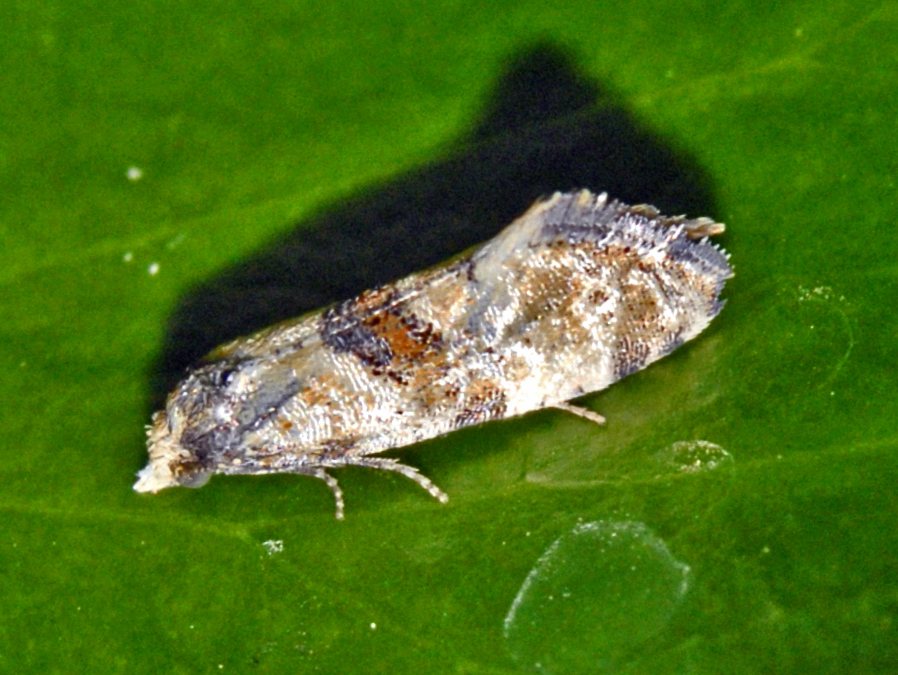

Scientific classification
- Kingdom: Animalia
- Phylum: Arthropoda
- Clade: Pancrustacea
- Class: Insecta
- Order: Lepidoptera
- Family: Tortricidae
- Genus: Cochylis
- Species: C. pallidana

Binomial name
- Cochylis pallidana Zeller, 1847

Synonyms
- Eupoecilia albicapitana Cooke, 1861; Conchylis dolosana Kennel, 1901; Conchylis glaseri Kasy, 1972

= Cochylis pallidana =

Sheep's-bit conch

Species of moth

Cochylis pallidana, the sheep's-bit conch, is a moth of the family Tortricidae. It was described by Zeller in 1847.

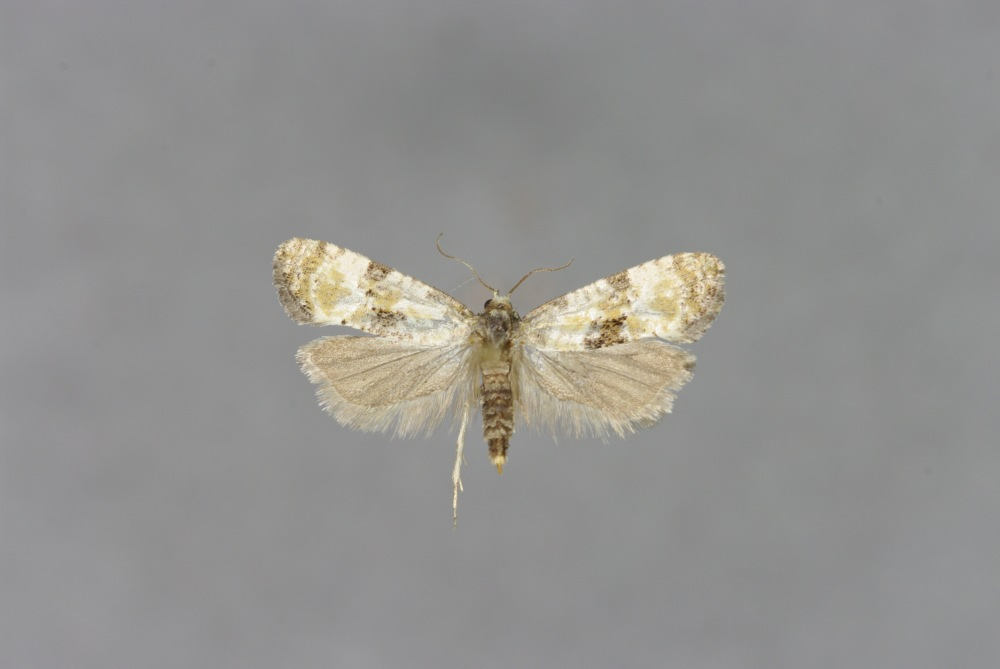
Cochylis pallidana. Mounted specimen

== Description ==
Cochylis pallidana has a wingspan of 11–14 mm. This species is very similar to Cochylis nana. It can be distinguished by the absence of ochreous suffusion in the basic colour of the forewings. Meyrick describes it - Head white. Thorax dark fuscous mixed with whitish. Forewings with costa slightly arched; ochreous-whitish, with faint greyish ochreous strigulae, costa strigulated with blackish; base and costa towards base suffusedly dark fuscous; a dark fuscous blackish -marked median fascia, narrowed on costa, broadly interrupted with pale ochreous above middle; a dark grey posterior transverse streak, sometimes extending to termen. Hindwings grey. Larva rose-pink, greenish-tinged; head and plate of 2 brown or black-brown: Julius von Kennel provides a full description.

== Biology ==
The larvae feed on Jasione montana. They feed within the seedheads of their host plant. The species overwinters in a cocoon. Adults are on wing from May to early August in two generations per year.

== Distribution and habitat ==
It is found in most of Europe, Asia Minor, Lebanon and Russia. The habitat consists of dry pastures, downland and sand-dunes.
