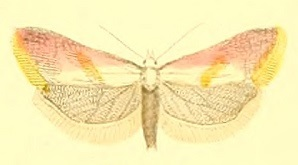
- in Westwood, J. O. (1854): Index entomologicus
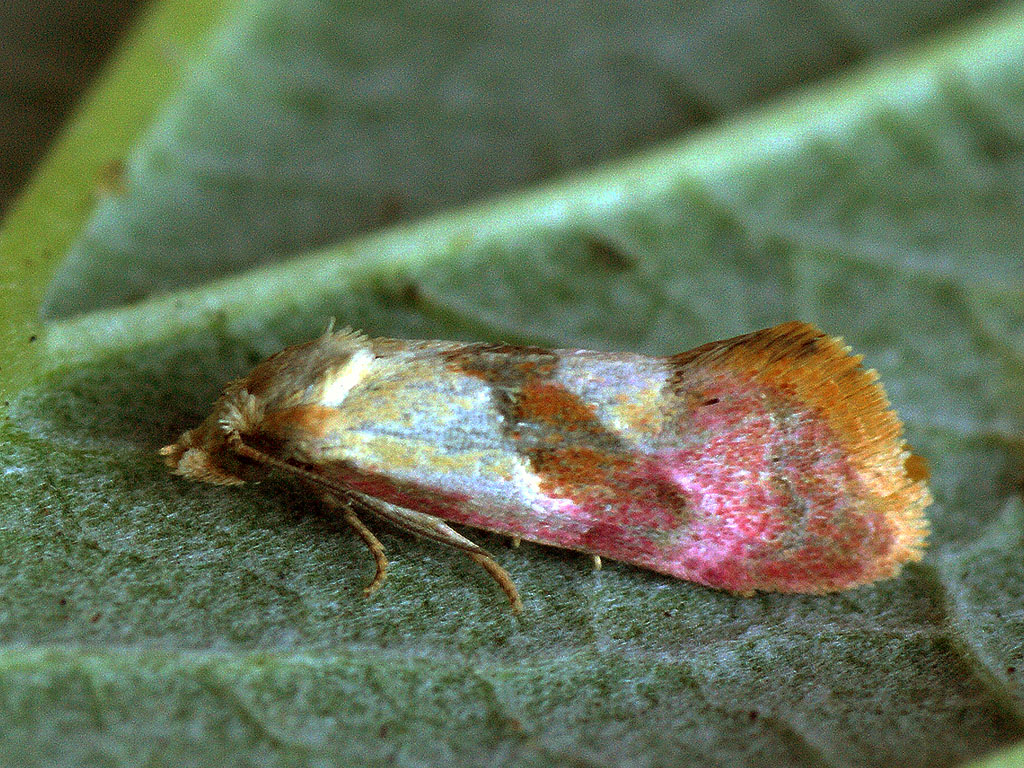
- Cochylis flaviciliana Russia, Moscow Oblast

Scientific classification
- Kingdom: Animalia
- Phylum: Arthropoda
- Clade: Pancrustacea
- Class: Insecta
- Order: Lepidoptera
- Family: Tortricidae
- Genus: Cochylis
- Species: C. flaviciliana

Binomial name
- Cochylis flaviciliana (Westwood, 1854)

Synonyms
- Eupoecilia flaviciliana Westwood, 1854

= Cochylis flaviciliana =

Species of moth

Cochylis flaviciliana, the gold-fringed conch, is a moth of the family Tortricidae. It was described by Westwood in 1854. It is found in most of Europe (except Portugal, most of the Balkan Peninsula and Ukraine) and north-western Africa. The habitat consists of chalky grasslands.

The wingspan is 10–17 mm. The forewings are contrasting rose-pink and cream-white. It differs from Cochylis roseana as follows : forewings with ground - colour ochreous whitish, cilia ferruginous-yellow, without dark fuscous line. The larva varies from dull green to reddish-brown head and plate of 2 brown. Julius von Kennel provides a full description.

Adults are on wing in May and again from late June to August in two generations per year.

The larvae feed on Knautia arvensis and Scabiosa species. They feed in the seedheads of their host plant. Larvae can be found from July to October, they then spin a cocoon on the ground amongst detritus where they hibernate before pupation takes place in spring.
