= Cochylis voxcana =

Scientific classification
- Domain: Eukaryota
- Kingdom: Animalia
- Phylum: Arthropoda
- Class: Insecta
- Order: Lepidoptera
- Family: Tortricidae
- Genus: Cochylis
- Species: C. voxcana

Binomial name
- Cochylis voxcana (Kearfott, 1907)

Synonyms
- Phalonia voxcana Kearfott, 1907; Thyraylia voxcana; Phalonia omphacitis Meyrick, 1912

Species of moth

Cochylis voxcana is a species of moth of the family Tortricidae. It is found in the United States, including New Hampshire.

== Taxonomy ==
Some sources list this species as a synonym of Cochylis hollandana.
