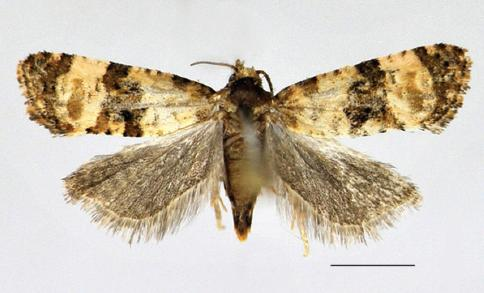

Scientific classification
- Domain: Eukaryota
- Kingdom: Animalia
- Phylum: Arthropoda
- Class: Insecta
- Order: Lepidoptera
- Family: Tortricidae
- Subfamily: Tortricinae
- Tribe: Cochylini
- Genus: Cochylichroa
- Species: C. atricapitana

Binomial name
- Cochylichroa atricapitana (Stephens, 1852)

Synonyms
- Eupoecilia atricapitana Stephens, 1852

= Cochylichroa atricapitana =

Species of moth

Cochylichroa atricapitana, the black-headed conch, is a moth of the family Tortricidae. It is found in China (Xinjiang) and the eastern Palearctic and most of Europe.

The wingspan is 10.5–13 mm. Very similar to Cochylis dubitana but differs from this in that the head and thorax are black. The forewings are white with grey or brown basal areas. There is a cross-band slightly basal to the middle (unlike many other Cochylis species this is often complete) and a distal cross-band. The hindwings are light grey-brown, slightly angular behind the apex. The larva is pale orange. Meyrick describes it - Head in male blackish, in female greyish-ochreous. Forewings with costa gently arched; rosy-ochreous -whitish, costa and dorsum strigulated with blackish; a small dark ashy-fuscous basal patch; a spot on costa touching it, a very irregular median fascia, a narrow terminal fascia dilated or furcate on costa, and cilia brown much marked with black; a pale greyish-ochreous cloud above tornus. Hindwings in male whitish-grey strigulated with grey, in female grey. The larva is pale yellow, faintly reddish-tinged above; head light brown; plate of 2 faintly brownish Julius von Kennel provides a full description.

There are two generations per year with adults on wing from May to June and again in August.

Cochylichroa atricapitana was formerly a member of the genus Cochylis, but was moved to the redefined genus Cochylichroa in 2019 as a result of phylogenetic analysis.
