= Cochylis psychrasema =

Scientific classification
- Kingdom: Animalia
- Phylum: Arthropoda
- Clade: Pancrustacea
- Class: Insecta
- Order: Lepidoptera
- Family: Tortricidae
- Genus: Cochylis
- Species: C. psychrasema

Binomial name
- Cochylis psychrasema (Meyrick in Caradja & Meyrick, 1937)

Synonyms
- Phalonia psychrasema Meyrick in Caradja & Meyrick, 1937

Species of moth

Cochylis psychrasema is a species of moth of the family Tortricidae. It is found in China (Yunnan and Tibet).
