= Cochylichroa avita =

Scientific classification
- Kingdom: Animalia
- Phylum: Arthropoda
- Class: Insecta
- Order: Lepidoptera
- Family: Tortricidae
- Subfamily: Tortricinae
- Tribe: Cochylini
- Genus: Cochylichroa
- Species: C. avita

Binomial name
- Cochylichroa avita Razowski, 1997

Species of moth

Cochylichroa avita is a species of moth of the family Tortricidae. It is found in the United States, where it has been recorded from Maryland and Ontario.

Cochylichroa avita was formerly a member of the genus Cochylis, but was moved to the redefined genus Cochylichroa in 2019 as a result of phylogenetic analysis.
