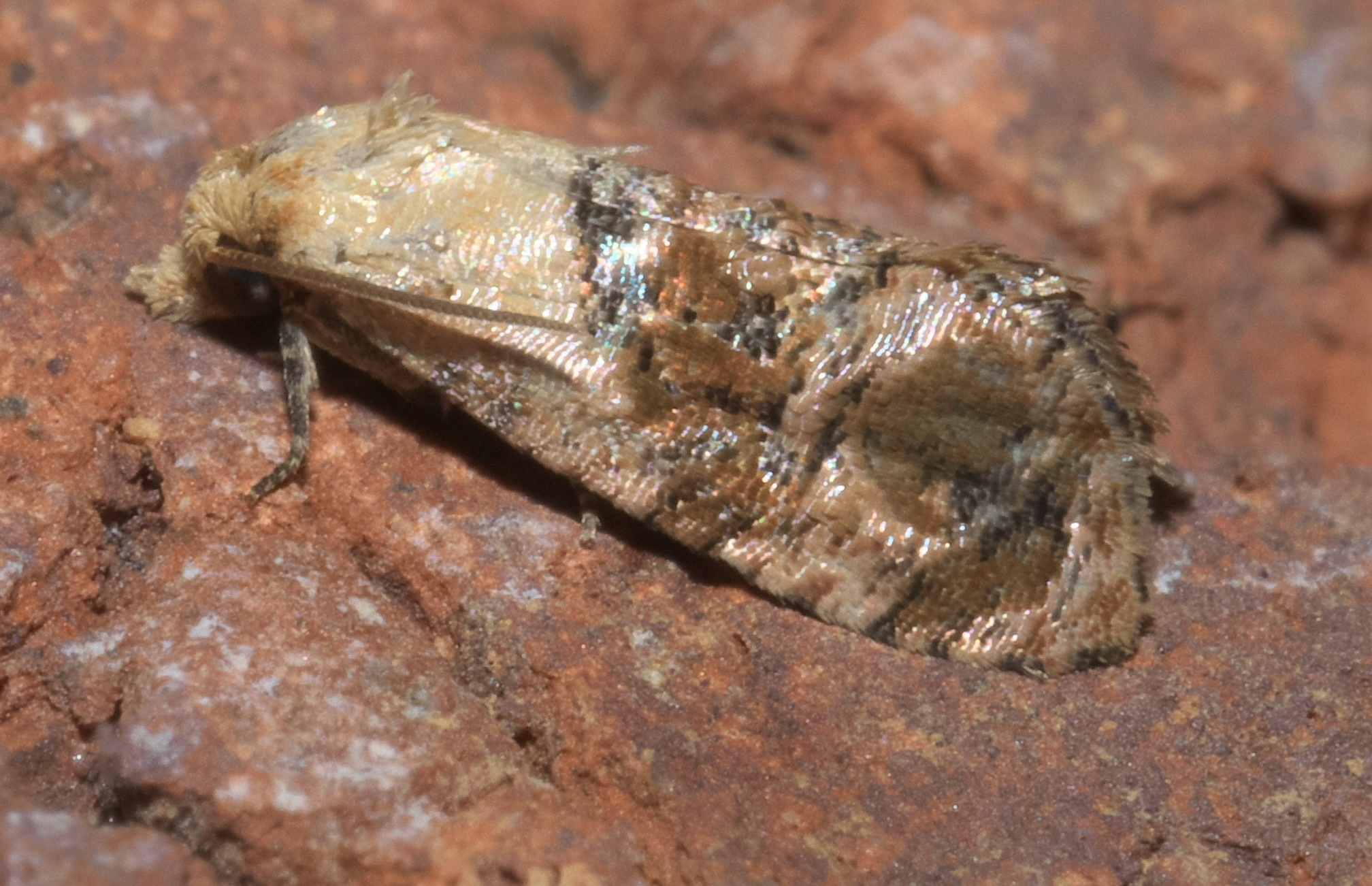

Scientific classification
- Domain: Eukaryota
- Kingdom: Animalia
- Phylum: Arthropoda
- Class: Insecta
- Order: Lepidoptera
- Family: Tortricidae
- Subfamily: Tortricinae
- Tribe: Cochylini
- Genus: Cochylichroa
- Species: C. hospes

Binomial name
- Cochylichroa hospes (Walsingham, 1884)

Synonyms
- Conchylis hospes Walsingham, 1884

= Cochylichroa hospes =

Species of moth

Cochylichroa hospes, the banded sunflower moth, is a moth of the family Tortricidae. It is found from North Carolina to Colorado, Utah, New Mexico and northern Arizona.

The length of the forewings is 5.5–8 mm. Adults are on wing from July to August.

The larvae feed on developing seeds in flower heads of Helianthus species. The species overwinters as a last instar larva.

Cochylichroa hospes was formerly a member of the genus Cochylis, but was moved to the redefined genus Cochylichroa in 2019 as a result of phylogenetic analysis.

== Gallery ==
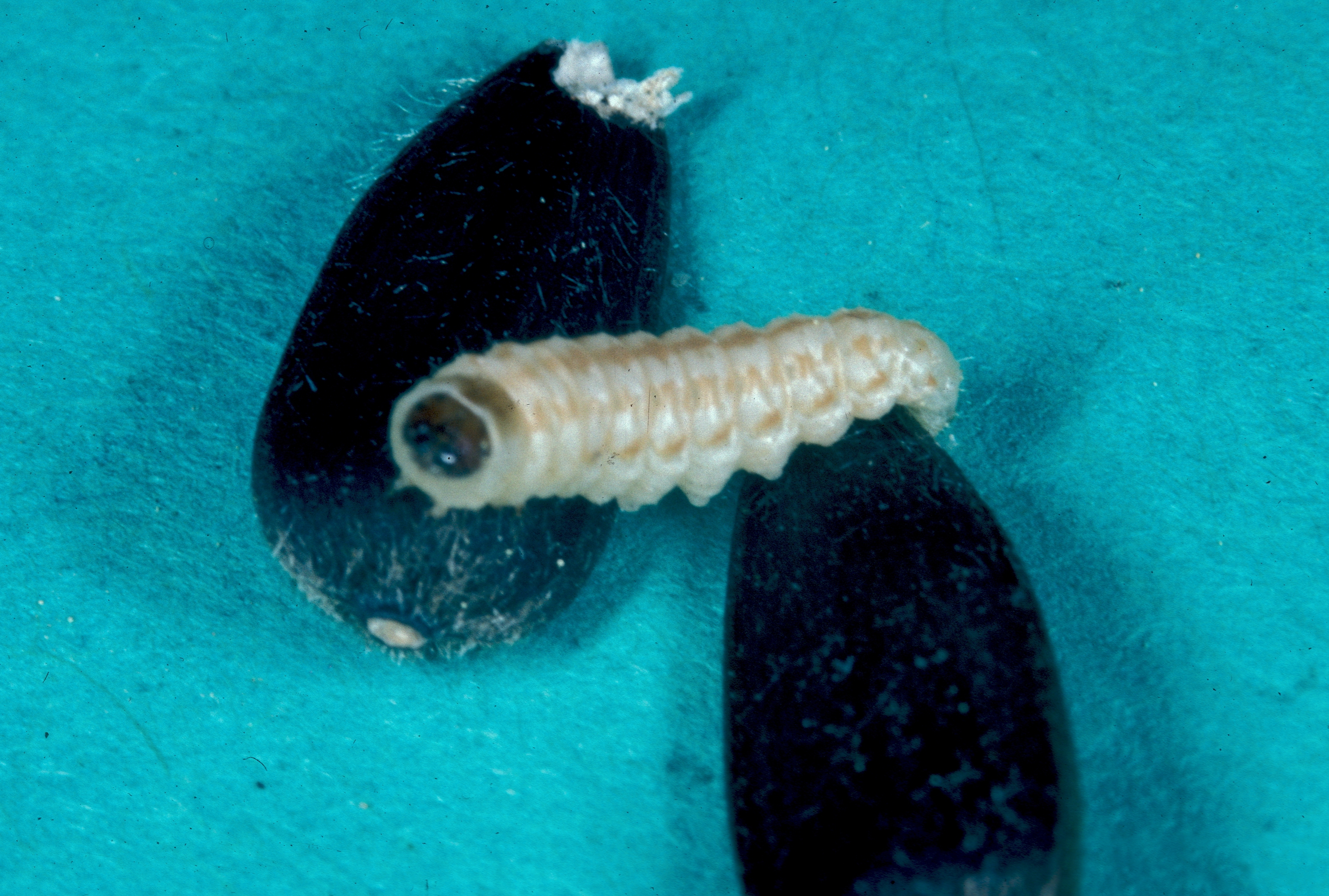
Larva

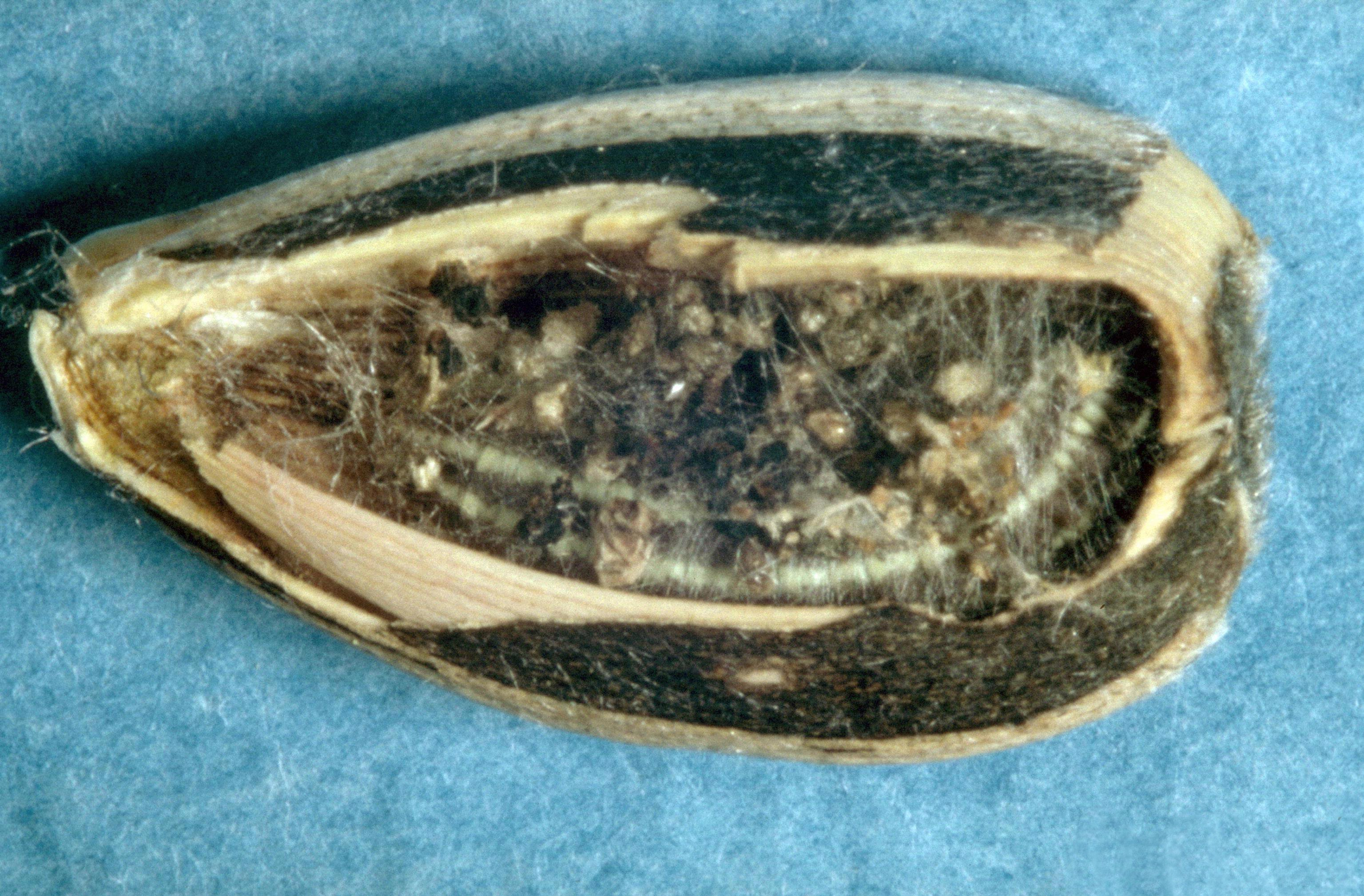
Larva
