= Cochylis formonana =

Scientific classification
- Kingdom: Animalia
- Phylum: Arthropoda
- Clade: Pancrustacea
- Class: Insecta
- Order: Lepidoptera
- Family: Tortricidae
- Genus: Cochylis
- Species: C. formonana

Binomial name
- Cochylis formonana (Kearfott, 1907)

Synonyms
- Phalonia formonana Kearfott, 1907; Phalonia myrinitis Meyrick, 1912

Species of moth

Cochylis formonana is a species of moth of the family Tortricidae. It is found in the United States, where it has been recorded from California.

Adults have been recorded on wing in March and July.
