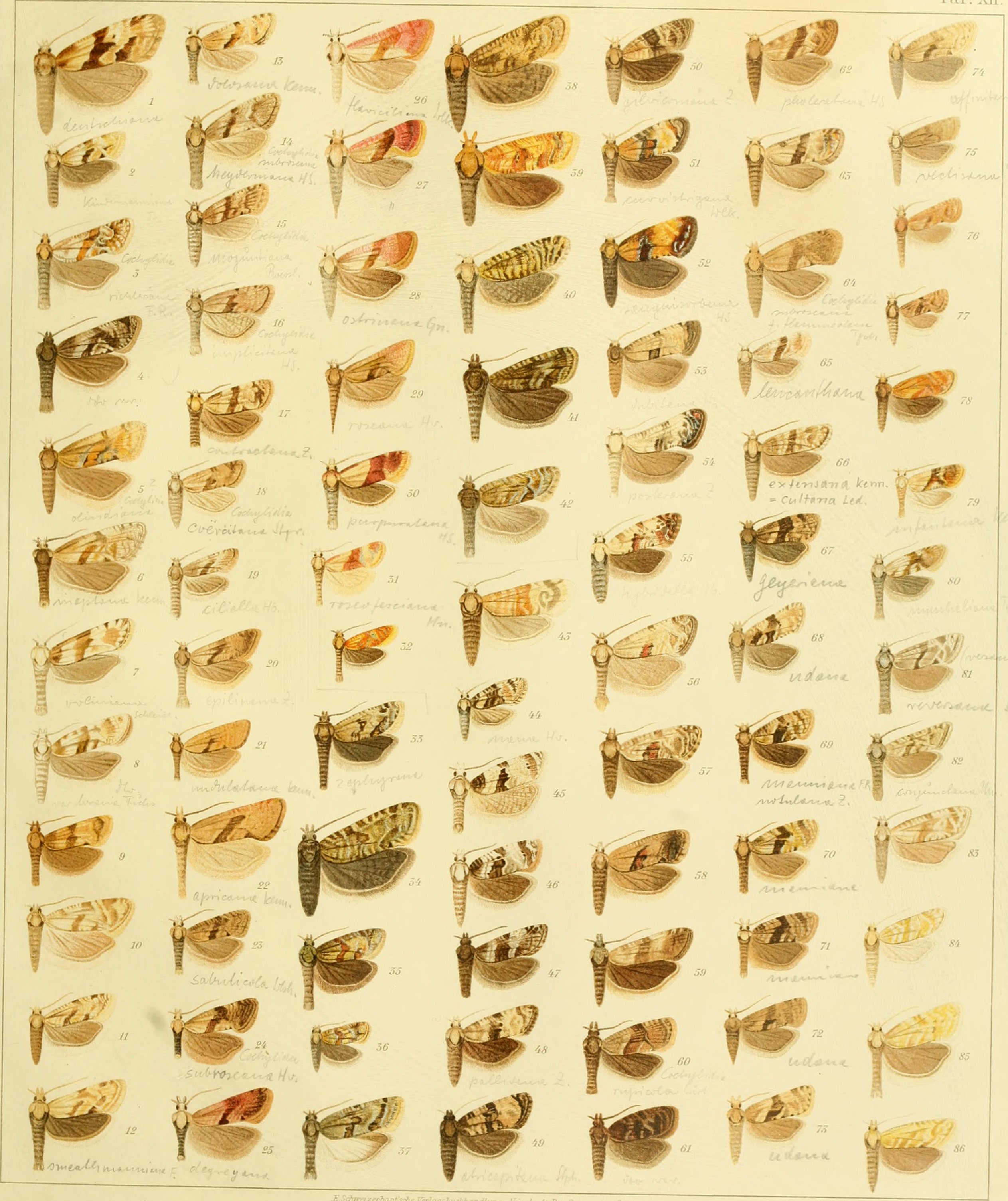
- in Kennel Die palaearktischen tortriciden figure 22

Scientific classification
- Kingdom: Animalia
- Phylum: Arthropoda
- Clade: Pancrustacea
- Class: Insecta
- Order: Lepidoptera
- Family: Tortricidae
- Genus: Cochylis
- Species: C. amoenana

Binomial name
- Cochylis amoenana Kennel, 1899

Synonyms
- Cochylis apricana Kennel, 1899

= Cochylis amoenana =

Species of moth

Cochylis amoenana is a species of moth of the family Tortricidae. It is found in Iran, Pakistan, Central Asia, Afghanistan, Tajikistan and Kyrgyzstan.
