= Cochylis militariana =

Scientific classification
- Kingdom: Animalia
- Phylum: Arthropoda
- Clade: Pancrustacea
- Class: Insecta
- Order: Lepidoptera
- Family: Tortricidae
- Genus: Cochylis
- Species: C. militariana

Binomial name
- Cochylis militariana Derra, 1992

Species of moth

Cochylis militariana is a species of moth of the family Tortricidae. It is found in south-eastern Turkey.
