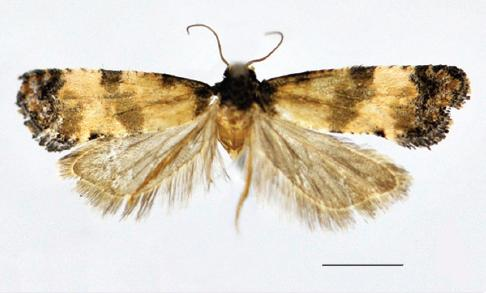

Scientific classification
- Kingdom: Animalia
- Phylum: Arthropoda
- Clade: Pancrustacea
- Class: Insecta
- Order: Lepidoptera
- Family: Tortricidae
- Genus: Cochylis
- Species: C. discerta

Binomial name
- Cochylis discerta Razowski, 1970

= Cochylis discerta =

Species of moth

Cochylis discerta is a moth of the family Tortricidae. It is found in China (Gansu, Inner Mongolia, Shanxi) and Mongolia.
