= Cochylis piana =

Scientific classification
- Kingdom: Animalia
- Phylum: Arthropoda
- Clade: Pancrustacea
- Class: Insecta
- Order: Lepidoptera
- Family: Tortricidae
- Genus: Cochylis
- Species: C. piana

Binomial name
- Cochylis piana (Kennel, 1919)

Synonyms
- Phalonia piana Kennel, 1919; Pontoturania pamira Obraztsov, 1943; Cochylis pseudefessana Razowski, 1963; Phalonia subposterana Toll, 1948

Species of moth

Cochylis piana is a species of moth of the family Tortricidae. It is found in Mongolia, China (Inner Mongolia, Liaoning, Shaanxi, Xinjiang), Kazakhstan, Tajikistan, Uzbekistan, Kyrgyzstan, Afghanistan, Iran and Russia.
