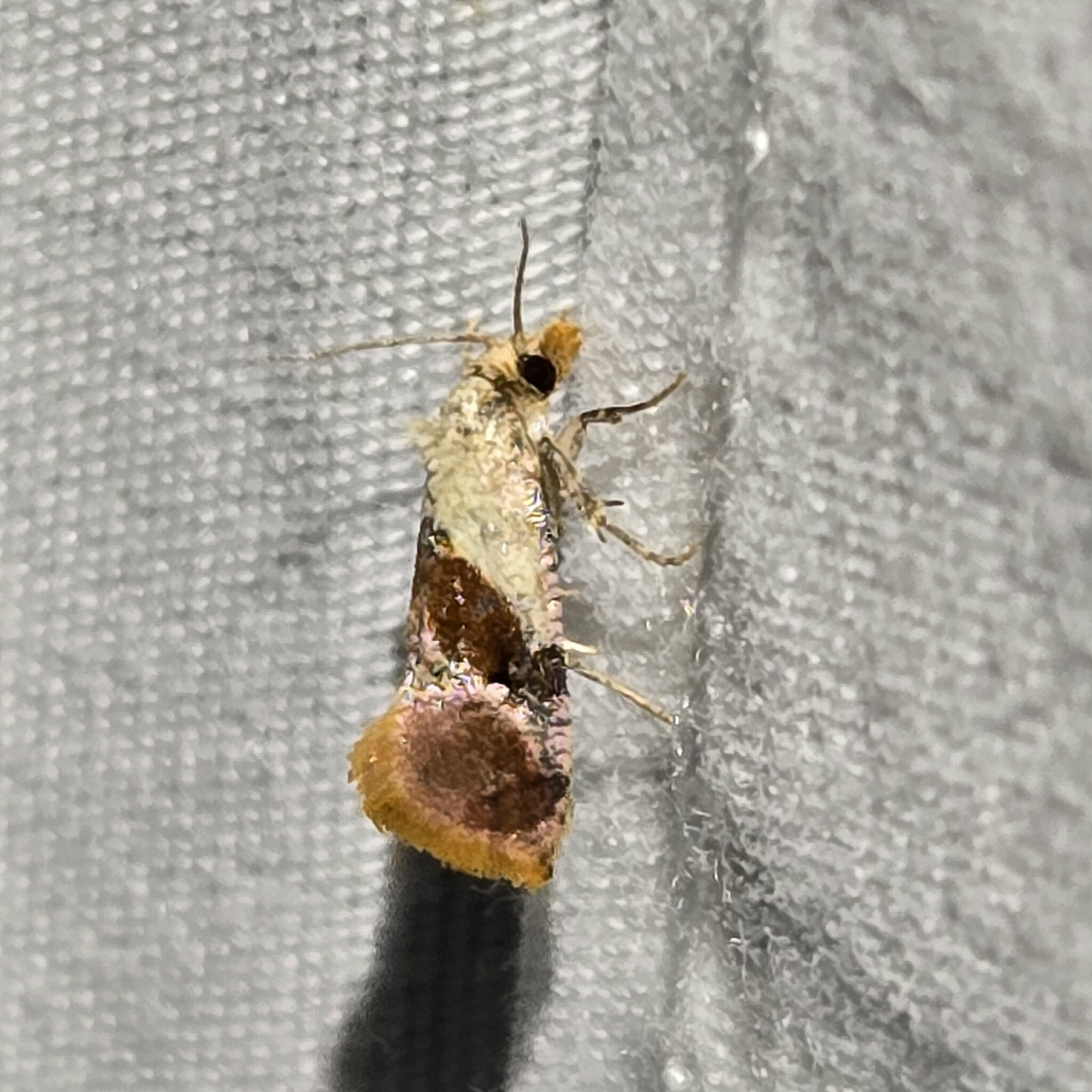

Scientific classification
- Kingdom: Animalia
- Phylum: Arthropoda
- Clade: Pancrustacea
- Class: Insecta
- Order: Lepidoptera
- Family: Tortricidae
- Subfamily: Tortricinae
- Tribe: Cochylini
- Genus: Cochylichroa
- Species: C. viscana

Binomial name
- Cochylichroa viscana (Kearfott, 1907)

Synonyms
- Phalonia viscana Kearfott, 1907; Phalonia peganitis Meyrick, 1912

= Cochylichroa viscana =

Species of moth

Cochylichroa viscana is a species of moth of the family Tortricidae. It is found in North America, where it has been recorded from Illinois, Iowa, Maryland, New Jersey, North Carolina, Quebec and Tennessee.

The wingspan is about 13 mm. Adults have been recorded on wing from May to September.

Cochylichroa viscana was formerly a member of the genus Cochylis, but was moved to the redefined genus Cochylichroa in 2019 as a result of phylogenetic analysis.
