= Cochylis erromena =

Scientific classification
- Kingdom: Animalia
- Phylum: Arthropoda
- Clade: Pancrustacea
- Class: Insecta
- Order: Lepidoptera
- Family: Tortricidae
- Genus: Cochylis
- Species: C. erromena

Binomial name
- Cochylis erromena Razowski, 1984

Species of moth

Cochylis erromena is a species of moth of the family Tortricidae found in Guerrero, Mexico.
