= Cochylis potrerillana =

Scientific classification
- Kingdom: Animalia
- Phylum: Arthropoda
- Clade: Pancrustacea
- Class: Insecta
- Order: Lepidoptera
- Family: Tortricidae
- Genus: Cochylis
- Species: C. potrerillana

Binomial name
- Cochylis potrerillana Razowski, 1999

Species of moth

Cochylis potrerillana is a species of moth of the family Tortricidae. It is found in Sinaloa, Mexico.
