= Cochylis telephora =

Scientific classification
- Kingdom: Animalia
- Phylum: Arthropoda
- Clade: Pancrustacea
- Class: Insecta
- Order: Lepidoptera
- Family: Tortricidae
- Genus: Cochylis
- Species: C. telephora

Binomial name
- Cochylis telephora Razowski & Becker, 1994

Species of moth

Cochylis telephora is a species of moth of the family Tortricidae. It is found in Minas Gerais, Brazil.
