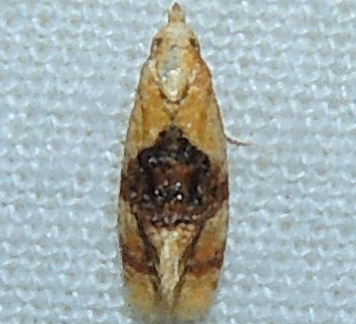

Scientific classification
- Kingdom: Animalia
- Phylum: Arthropoda
- Clade: Pancrustacea
- Class: Insecta
- Order: Lepidoptera
- Family: Tortricidae
- Genus: Cochylis
- Species: C. bucera

Binomial name
- Cochylis bucera Razowski, 1997

= Cochylis bucera =

Species of moth

Cochylis bucera is a species of moth of the family Tortricidae. It is found in North America, where it has been recorded from Illinois, Indiana, Massachusetts, Michigan, New Mexico, Ontario and Pennsylvania.

The wingspan is about 8 mm. Adults are on wing from June to September.
