= Cochylis rosaria =

Scientific classification
- Kingdom: Animalia
- Phylum: Arthropoda
- Clade: Pancrustacea
- Class: Insecta
- Order: Lepidoptera
- Family: Tortricidae
- Genus: Cochylis
- Species: C. rosaria

Binomial name
- Cochylis rosaria Razowski & Becker, 1993

Species of moth

Cochylis rosaria is a species of moth of the family Tortricidae. It is found in Guerrero, Mexico.
