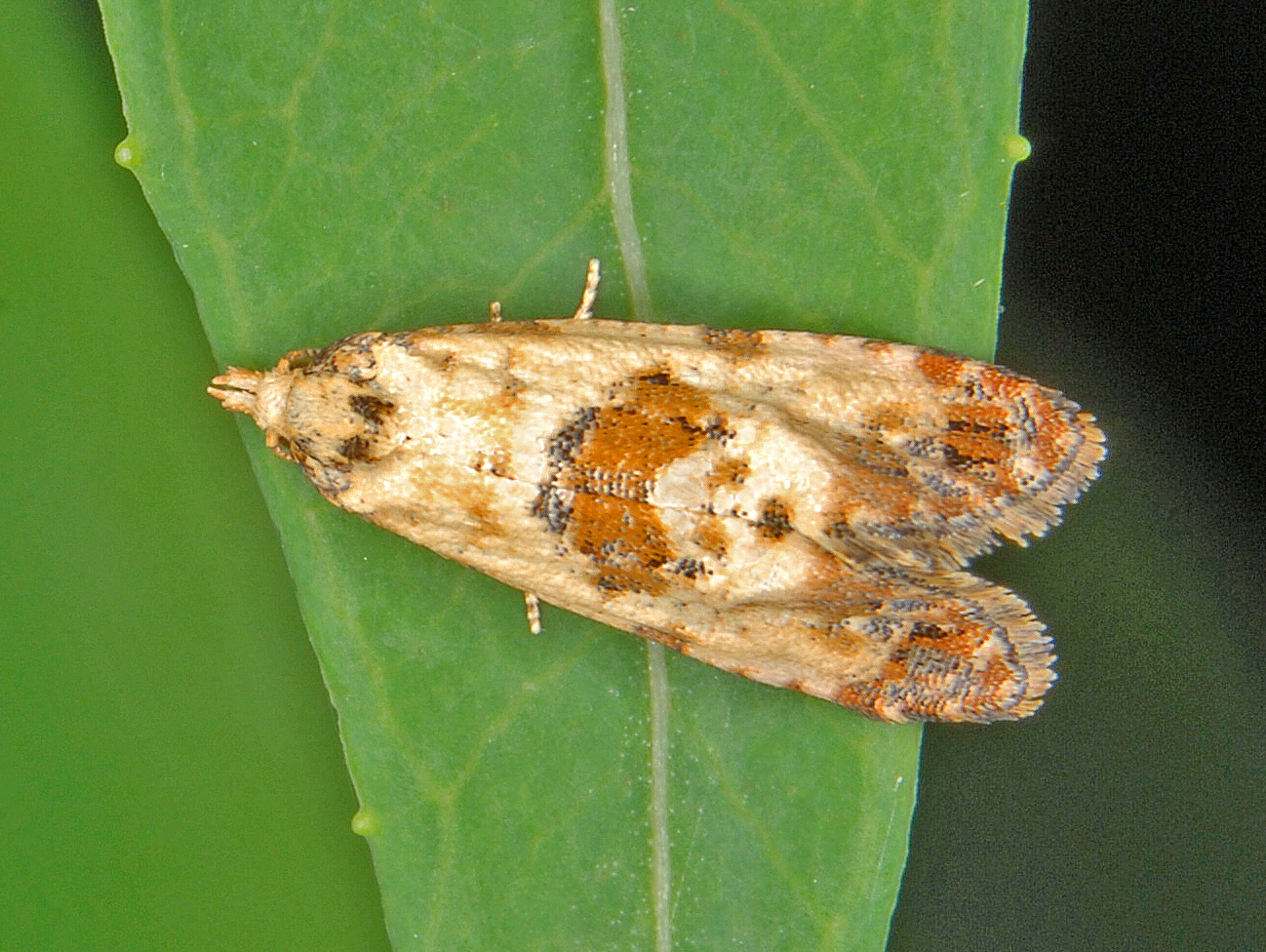
- Cochylis molliculana. Dorsal view

Scientific classification
- Kingdom: Animalia
- Phylum: Arthropoda
- Clade: Pancrustacea
- Class: Insecta
- Order: Lepidoptera
- Family: Tortricidae
- Genus: Cochylis
- Species: C. molliculana

Binomial name
- Cochylis molliculana Zeller, 1847

Synonyms
- Conchylis calavrytana Rebel, 1906; Cochylis rufosignana Kennel, 1899

= Cochylis molliculana =

Species of moth

Cochylis molliculana is a moth of the family Tortricidae.

== Description ==
This species can be found in Great Britain, France, Spain, Italy, Croatia, Greece and Cyprus.

== Habitat ==
These moths mainly inhabit coastal environments, wasteground, chalky meadows and scrubs.

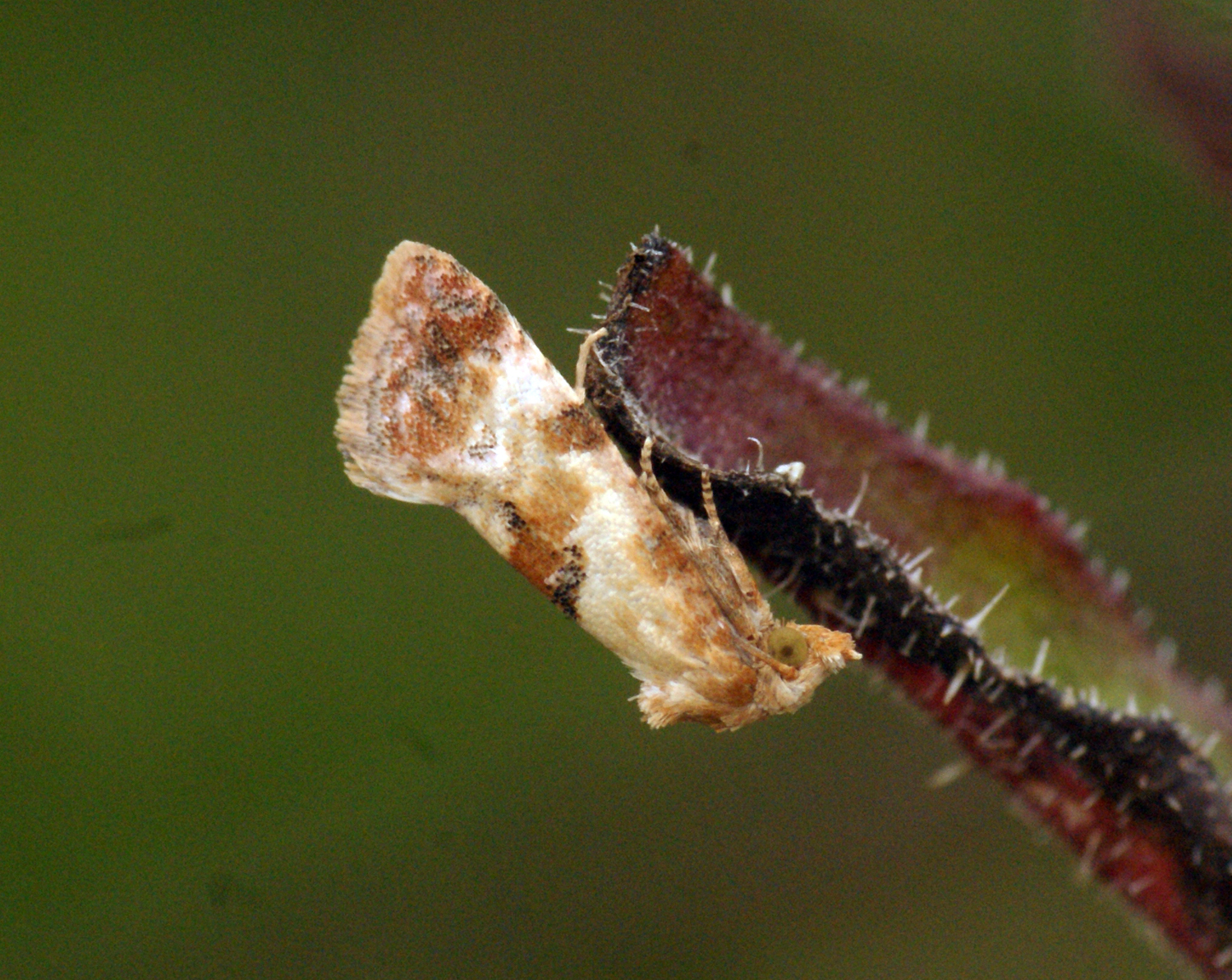
Side view

== Description ==
Cochylis molliculana has a wingspan of 11–15 mm. Labial palps, head, chest and tegulae of these moths are golden-brown. Forewings show a cream white background color, with some patches of different color, ranging from reddish brown to gray and ocher. In the middle of the forewings there is a blackish transversal band. The edges are fringed and bordered by a thin dark line. Underside of the forewings is pale brown. Also the hind wings are pale brown.

== Biology ==
Cochylis molliculana is a bivoltine species, having two generations per year. Adults fly in May – June and in August - September. Females lay eggs on the flowerhead of the bristly oxtongue (Picris echioides) in May–June and in July–September. The larvae feed on the seedheads of Picris echioides. The first generation pupates in a silken cocoon within the seedheads, while the second generation leaves the seedheads and the larvae spin a cocoon amongst debris in which they overwinter.
