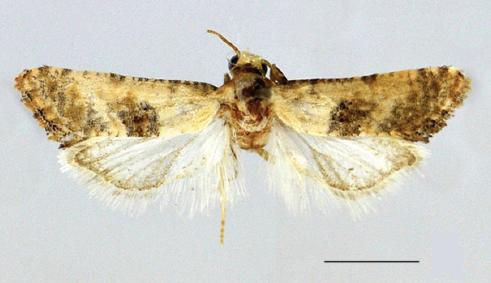

Scientific classification
- Kingdom: Animalia
- Phylum: Arthropoda
- Clade: Pancrustacea
- Class: Insecta
- Order: Lepidoptera
- Family: Tortricidae
- Genus: Cochylis
- Species: C. faustana

Binomial name
- Cochylis faustana (Kennel, 1919)

Synonyms
- Phalonia faustana Kennel, 1919

= Cochylis faustana =

Species of moth

Cochylis faustana is a moth of the family Tortricidae. It is found in China (Inner Mongolia, Xinjiang) and Russia.

The wingspan is 8–9.5 mm.
