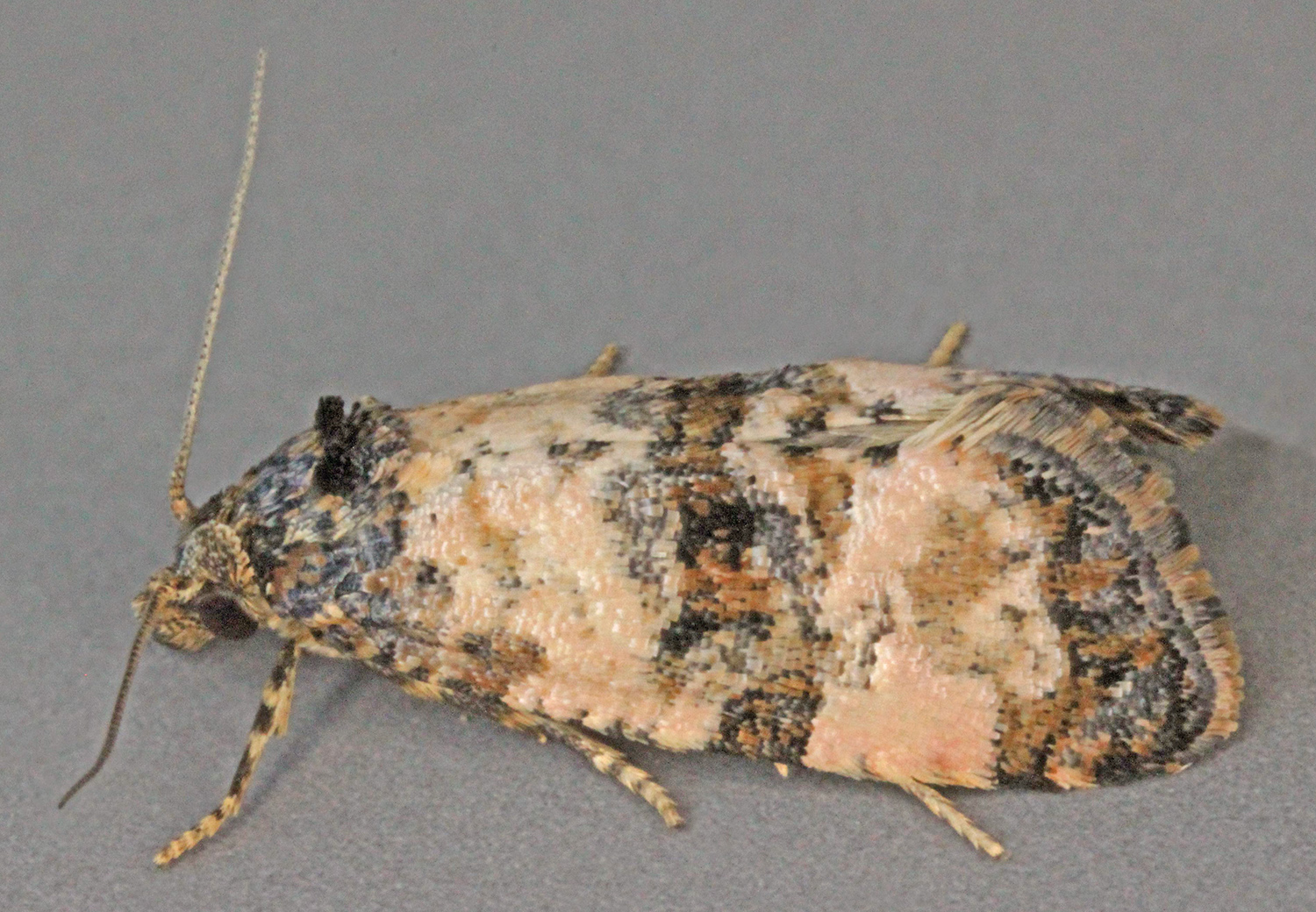
- Cochylis atricapitana

Scientific classification
- Kingdom: Animalia
- Phylum: Arthropoda
- Clade: Pancrustacea
- Class: Insecta
- Order: Lepidoptera
- Family: Tortricidae
- Tribe: Cochylini
- Genus: Cochylis; Treitschke, 1829

Synonyms
- Chochylis Duponchel, 1836; Conchylis Sodoffsky, 1837; Pontoturania Obraztsov, 1943; Acornutia Obraztsov, 1944; Brevicornutia Razowski, 1960; Longicornutia Razowski, 1960; Neocochylis Razowski, 1960; Paracochylis Razowski, 1960; Clothoa Pogue, 1990; Rolandylis Gibeaux, 1985; Thyraylia Walsingham, 1897

= Cochylis =

Genus of tortrix moths

Cochylis is a genus of moths belonging to the subfamily Tortricinae of the family Tortricidae.

As a result of phylogenetic analysis, the species Cochylis arthuri, C. atricapitana, C. aurorana, C. avita, C. hoffmanana, C. hospes, C. temerana, and C. viscana were moved to the redefined genus Cochylichroa in 2019.

== Distribution ==
All species are distributed in the Holarctic, Oriental and Neotropical regions.

== Biology ==
In the Palaearctic Region, there are one or two generations annually, and overwintering occurs in the larval stage. Larvae are oligophagous and feed mainly on plants belonging to Asteraceae.

== Species ==
- Cochylis aestiva (Walsingham, 1900)
- Cochylis aethoclasma Diakonoff, 1976
- Cochylis amoenana Kennel, 1899
- Cochylis anerista Razowski, 1984
- Cochylis argentinana Razowski, 1967
- Cochylis bana (Kearfott, 1907)
- Cochylis bucera Razowski, 1997
- Cochylis bunteana (Robinson, 1869)
- Cochylis campuloclinium Brown, 2006
- Cochylis carmelana (Kearfott, 1907)
- Cochylis cataphracta Razowski & Wojtusiak, 2006
- Cochylis caulocatax Razowski, 1984
- Cochylis defessana Mann, 1861
- Cochylis discana (Kearfott, 1907)
- Cochylis discerta Razowski, 1970
- Cochylis disputabilis (Walsingham, 1914)
- Cochylis dormitoria Razowski, 1997
- Cochylis dubitana (Hubner, [1796-1799])
- Cochylis epilinana Duponchel, in Godart, 1842
- Cochylis erromena Razowski, 1984
- Cochylis eupacria Razowski, 1984
- Cochylis eureta Razowski, 1984
- Cochylis eutaxia Razowski, 1984
- Cochylis eutheta Razowski, 1984
- Cochylis exomala Razowski, 1984
- Cochylis faustana (Kennel, 1919)
- Cochylis fidens Razowski & Becker, 2002
- Cochylis flabilis Razowski, 1993
- Cochylis flaviciliana (Westwood, in Wood, 1854)
- Cochylis formonana (Kearfott, 1907)
- Cochylis fusca Pogue, 2001
- Cochylis gunniana (Busck, 1907)
- Cochylis heratana Razowski, 1967
- Cochylis hollandana (Kearfott, 1907)
- Cochylis hybridella (Hubner, [1810-1813])
- Cochylis indica Razowski, 1968
- Cochylis insipida Razowski, 1990
- Cochylis laetana Razowski, 1968
- Cochylis lutosa Razowski, 1967
- Cochylis maiana (Kearfott, 1907)
- Cochylis maestana Kennel, 1899
- Cochylis methoeca Razowski & Becker, 1986
- Cochylis militariana Derra, 1992
- Cochylis molliculana Zeller, 1847
- Cochylis morosana Kennel, 1899
- Cochylis mystes Razowski, 1990
- Cochylis nana (Haworth, [1811])
- Cochylis obtrusa Razowski & Becker, 1983
- Cochylis pallidana Zeller, 1847
- Cochylis parallelana Walsingham, 1879
- Cochylis philypna Razowski & Becker, 1994
- Cochylis piana (Kennel, 1919)
- Cochylis posterana Zeller, 1847
- Cochylis potrerillana Razowski, 1999
- Cochylis psychrasema (Meyrick in Caradja & Meyrick, 1937)
- Cochylis ringsi Metzler, 1999
- Cochylis rosaria Razowski & Becker, 1993
- Cochylis roseana (Haworth, [1811])
- Cochylis sagittigera Razowski & Becker, 1983
- Cochylis salebrana Mann, 1862
- Cochylis sannitica Trematerra, 1995
- Cochylis securifera Razowski & Becker, 1983
- Cochylis serrana Razowski & Becker, 2007
- Cochylis sierraemaestrae Razowski & Becker, 2007
- Cochylis similana Razowski, 1963
- Cochylis telephora Razowski & Becker, 1994
- Cochylis tephrodrypta Razowski, 1984
- Cochylis torva Razowski & Becker, 1983
- Cochylis transversana Walsingham, 1879
- Cochylis triangula Sun & Li, 2013
- Cochylis typhilinea Razowski, 1984
- Cochylis virilia Pogue, 2001
- Cochylis voxcana (Kearfott, 1907)
- Cochylis yinyangana Metzler, 2012

== See also ==
- List of Tortricidae genera
