= Cochylis mystes =

Scientific classification
- Kingdom: Animalia
- Phylum: Arthropoda
- Clade: Pancrustacea
- Class: Insecta
- Order: Lepidoptera
- Family: Tortricidae
- Genus: Cochylis
- Species: C. mystes

Binomial name
- Cochylis mystes Razowski, 1990

Species of moth

Cochylis mystes is a species of moth of the family Tortricidae. It is found in Guerrero, Mexico.
