= Cochylis sierraemaestrae =

Scientific classification
- Kingdom: Animalia
- Phylum: Arthropoda
- Clade: Pancrustacea
- Class: Insecta
- Order: Lepidoptera
- Family: Tortricidae
- Genus: Cochylis
- Species: C. sierraemaestrae

Binomial name
- Cochylis sierraemaestrae Razowski & Becker, 2007

Species of moth

Cochylis sierraemaestrae is a species of moth of the family Tortricidae. It is found on Cuba.

The wingspan is about 11 mm.

== Etymology ==
The species name refers to the Sierra Maestra mountain range.
