= Cochylis similana =

Scientific classification
- Kingdom: Animalia
- Phylum: Arthropoda
- Clade: Pancrustacea
- Class: Insecta
- Order: Lepidoptera
- Family: Tortricidae
- Genus: Cochylis
- Species: C. similana

Binomial name
- Cochylis similana Razowski, 1963

Species of moth

Cochylis similana is a species of moth of the family Tortricidae. It is found in Iran (Yazd Province), eastern Afghanistan, northern Lebanon and the Caucasus.
