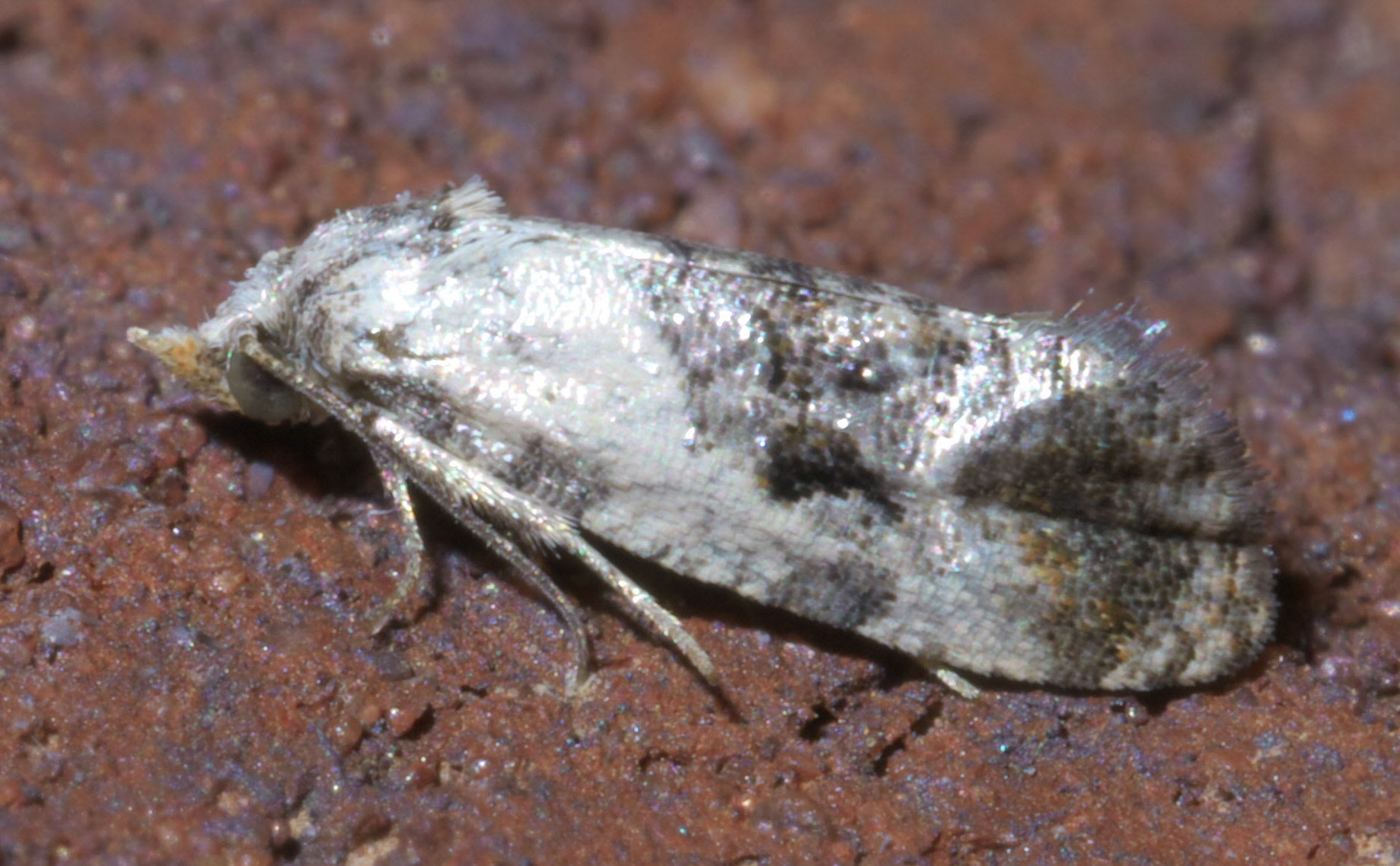
- Cochylichroa hoffmanana

Scientific classification
- Kingdom: Animalia
- Phylum: Arthropoda
- Class: Insecta
- Order: Lepidoptera
- Family: Tortricidae
- Subfamily: Tortricinae
- Tribe: Cochylini
- Genus: Cochylichroa; Obraztsov & Swatschek, 1958

= Cochylichroa =

Genus of moths

Cochylichroa is a genus of tortricid moths in the family Tortricidae. They are found primarily in North America, although Cochylichroa atricapitana is a Palearctic species.

The genus Cochylichroa was redefined in 2019 to contain nine species related in phylogenetic analysis; most were previously placed in the genus Conchylis.

== Species ==
These nine species belong to the genus Cochylichroa:

- Cochylichroa arthuri (Dang, 1984) – Arthur's sunflower moth
- Cochylichroa atricapitana
- Cochylichroa aurorana (Kearfott, 1907)
- Cochylichroa avita (Razowski, 1997),
- Cochylichroa foxcana (Kearfott, 1907),
- Cochylichroa hoffmanana (Kearfott, 1907) – Hoffman's cochlid
- Cochylichroa hospes (Walsingham, 1884) – banded sunflower moth
- Cochylichroa temerana (Busck, 1907)
- Cochylichroa viscana (Kearfott, 1907)
