= Rolandylis fusca =

Scientific classification
- Kingdom: Animalia
- Phylum: Arthropoda
- Class: Insecta
- Order: Lepidoptera
- Family: Tortricidae
- Genus: Rolandylis
- Species: R. fusca

Binomial name
- Rolandylis fusca Pogue, 2001

Synonyms
- Cochylis fusca (Pogue, 2001)

Species of moth

Rolandylis fusca is a species of moth of the family Tortricidae. It is known from Mississippi, Illinois, Indiana, Missouri, Ohio and Pennsylvania.

The length of the forewings is 3.4–4.7 millimetres (0.13–0.19 in).
