= Cochylis cataphracta =

Scientific classification
- Kingdom: Animalia
- Phylum: Arthropoda
- Clade: Pancrustacea
- Class: Insecta
- Order: Lepidoptera
- Family: Tortricidae
- Genus: Cochylis
- Species: C. cataphracta

Binomial name
- Cochylis cataphracta Razowski & Wojtusiak, 2006

Species of moth

Cochylis cataphracta is a species of moth of the family Tortricidae. It is found in Venezuela.

The wingspan is about 26 mm.
