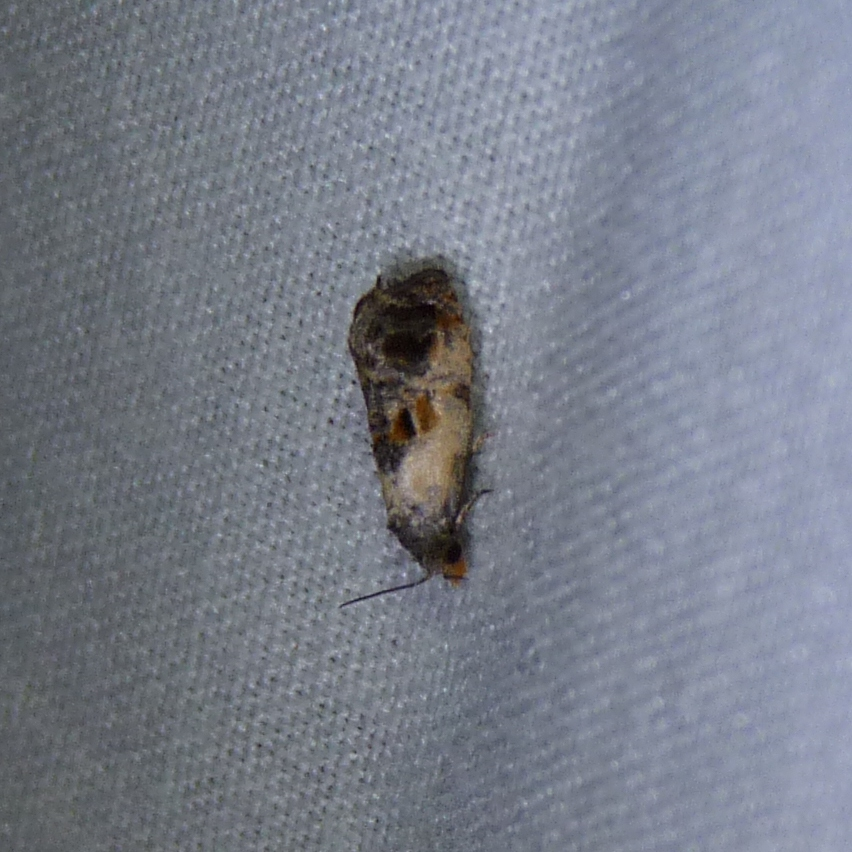

Scientific classification
- Kingdom: Animalia
- Phylum: Arthropoda
- Clade: Pancrustacea
- Class: Insecta
- Order: Lepidoptera
- Family: Tortricidae
- Genus: Cochylis
- Species: C. maiana

Binomial name
- Cochylis maiana (Kearfott, 1907)

Synonyms
- Phalonia maiana Kearfott, 1907; Phtheochroa maiana; Rolandylis maiana; Rolandylis catalonica Gibeaux, 1985; Cochylis catalonica

= Cochylis maiana =

Species of moth

Cochylis maiana, Kearfott's rolandylis moth, is a moth of the family Tortricidae. It is found in eastern North America, from Nova Scotia south to New Hampshire, Pennsylvania and New Jersey and North Carolina, but has also been recorded from southern France.
