= Cochylis gunniana =

Scientific classification
- Kingdom: Animalia
- Phylum: Arthropoda
- Clade: Pancrustacea
- Class: Insecta
- Order: Lepidoptera
- Family: Tortricidae
- Genus: Cochylis
- Species: C. gunniana

Binomial name
- Cochylis gunniana (Busck, 1907)

Synonyms
- Phalonia gunniana Busck, 1907; Thyraylia gunniana

Species of moth

Cochylis gunniana is a species of moth of the family Tortricidae. It is found in the United States, where it has been recorded from Maryland and Kentucky.

Adults have been recorded on wing in July.
