= Cochylis eutaxia =

Scientific classification
- Kingdom: Animalia
- Phylum: Arthropoda
- Clade: Pancrustacea
- Class: Insecta
- Order: Lepidoptera
- Family: Tortricidae
- Genus: Cochylis
- Species: C. eutaxia

Binomial name
- Cochylis eutaxia Razowski, 1984

Species of moth

Cochylis eutaxia is a species of moth of the family Tortricidae. It is found in Baja California, Mexico.
