= Cochylis aethoclasma =

Scientific classification
- Kingdom: Animalia
- Phylum: Arthropoda
- Clade: Pancrustacea
- Class: Insecta
- Order: Lepidoptera
- Family: Tortricidae
- Genus: Cochylis
- Species: C. aethoclasma

Binomial name
- Cochylis aethoclasma Diakonoff, 1976

Species of insect

Cochylis aethoclasma is a species of moth of the family Tortricidae. It is found in Nepal.
