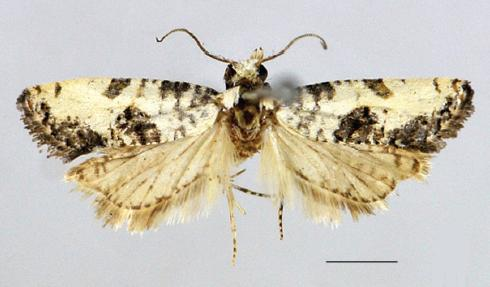

Scientific classification
- Kingdom: Animalia
- Phylum: Arthropoda
- Clade: Pancrustacea
- Class: Insecta
- Order: Lepidoptera
- Family: Tortricidae
- Genus: Cochylis
- Species: C. triangula

Binomial name
- Cochylis triangula Sun & Li, 2013

= Cochylis triangula =

Species of moth

Cochylis triangula is a moth of the family Tortricidae. It is found in China in Guizhou and Yunnan.
