= Cochylis yinyangana =

Scientific classification
- Kingdom: Animalia
- Phylum: Arthropoda
- Clade: Pancrustacea
- Class: Insecta
- Order: Lepidoptera
- Family: Tortricidae
- Genus: Cochylis
- Species: C. yinyangana

Binomial name
- Cochylis yinyangana Metzler, 2012

Species of moth

Cochylis yinyangana is a species of moth of the family Tortricidae. It is only known from the White Sands National Park in Otero County, New Mexico and at Carlsbad Caverns National Park in Eddy County, also in New Mexico.

The length of the forewings is 4.2–6.2 millimetres (0.17–0.24 in) for males and 4.6–5.5 millimetres (0.18–0.22 in) for females.
