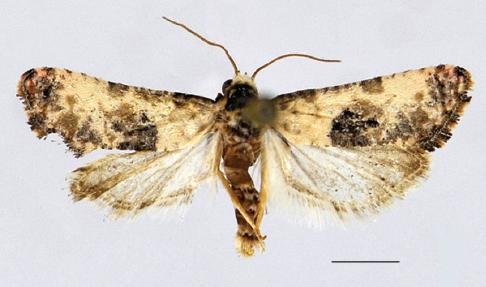
- Cochylis posterana hyrcana

Scientific classification
- Kingdom: Animalia
- Phylum: Arthropoda
- Clade: Pancrustacea
- Class: Insecta
- Order: Lepidoptera
- Family: Tortricidae
- Genus: Cochylis
- Species: C. posterana

Binomial name
- Cochylis posterana Zeller, 1847

Synonyms
- Conchylis posterana var. collaterana Seebold, 1879; Conchylis cuerana Chretien, 1925; Conchylis losterana Seebold, 1879; Cochylis minorana Prittwitz, 1845; Cochylis nigrociliana Kennel, 1899; Phalonia nubivagana Zerny, 1935; Phalonia posterana hyrcana Toll, 1948

= Cochylis posterana =

Species of moth

Cochylis posterana is a moth of the family Tortricidae. It is found in Europe, Iran and China (Gansu, Xinjiang).

The wingspan is 13–16 mm.

Larvae have been recorded feeding on Carduus nutans, Cirsium lanceolatum and Centaurea jacea.

== Subspecies ==
- Cochylis posterana posterana (Europe)
- Cochylis posterana hyrcana (Toll, 1948) (Iran, China: Gansu, Xinjiang)
