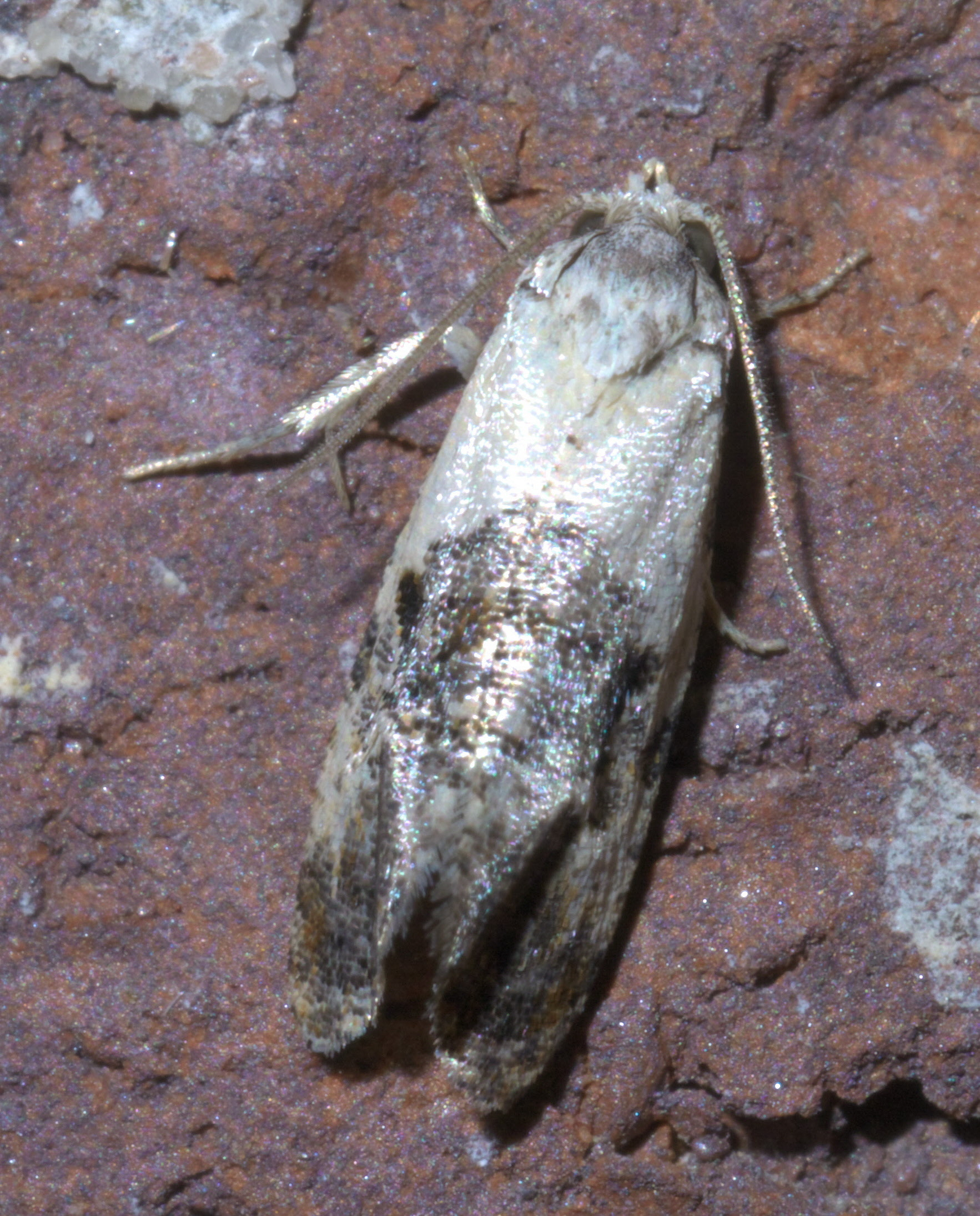

Scientific classification
- Kingdom: Animalia
- Phylum: Arthropoda
- Class: Insecta
- Order: Lepidoptera
- Family: Tortricidae
- Subfamily: Tortricinae
- Tribe: Cochylini
- Genus: Cochylichroa
- Species: C. hoffmanana

Binomial name
- Cochylichroa hoffmanana (Kearfott, 1907)

Synonyms
- Phalonia hoffmanana Kearfott, 1907; Aethes hoffmanana; Phalonia baryzela Meyrick, 1912; Cochylis hofmanana Razowski, 1997; Cochylis magnaedoeagana Gibeaux, 1985; Phalonia marloffiana Busck, 1907; Phalonia nonlavana Kearfott, 1907; Phalonia telifera Meyrick, 1912; Phalonia toxcana Kearfott, 1907; Phalonia zoxcana Kearfott, 1907

= Cochylichroa hoffmanana =

Species of moth

Cochylichroa hoffmanana, or Hoffman's cochlid moth, is a species of moth of the family Tortricidae. It was described by William D. Kearfott in 1907. It is found in France and North America, where it has been recorded from California, Connecticut, Florida, Illinois, Indiana, Kentucky, Maine, Manitoba, Maryland, Minnesota, New Brunswick, New York, Newfoundland, North Carolina, Nova Scotia, Ohio, Oklahoma, Ontario, Quebec, Tennessee and Vermont.

The wingspan is 11–12 millimetres (0.43–0.47 in). Adults have been recorded on wing in February and from April to September.

Cochylichroa hoffmanana was formerly a member of the genus Cochylis, but was moved to the redefined genus Cochylichroa in 2019 as a result of phylogenetic analysis.
