= Cochylis bana =

Scientific classification
- Kingdom: Animalia
- Phylum: Arthropoda
- Clade: Pancrustacea
- Class: Insecta
- Order: Lepidoptera
- Family: Tortricidae
- Genus: Cochylis
- Species: C. bana

Binomial name
- Cochylis bana (Kearfott, 1907)

Synonyms
- Phalonia bana Kearfott, 1907; Thyraylia bana; Phalonia rhodites Meyrick, 1912

Species of moth

Cochylis bana is a species of moth of the family Tortricidae. It is found in North America, where it has been recorded from Florida, Indiana, Maryland, Massachusetts, Ohio, Oklahoma and Ontario.

The wingspan is 10–12 mm. Adults are on wing in April and from June to September.
