= Cochylis sannitica =

Scientific classification
- Kingdom: Animalia
- Phylum: Arthropoda
- Clade: Pancrustacea
- Class: Insecta
- Order: Lepidoptera
- Family: Tortricidae
- Genus: Cochylis
- Species: C. sannitica

Binomial name
- Cochylis sannitica Trematerra, 1995

Species of moth

Cochylis sannitica is a species of moth of the family Tortricidae. It is found in Italy.

The wingspan is 11–13 mm. Adults are on wing in July.
