= Cochylis virilia =

Scientific classification
- Domain: Eukaryota
- Kingdom: Animalia
- Phylum: Arthropoda
- Class: Insecta
- Order: Lepidoptera
- Family: Tortricidae
- Genus: Cochylis
- Species: C. virilia

Binomial name
- Cochylis virilia (Pogue, 2001)

Synonyms
- Rolandylis virilia Pogue, 2001

Species of moth

Cochylis virilia is a moth of the family Tortricidae. It is only known from Maine.
