= Cochylis sagittigera =

Scientific classification
- Kingdom: Animalia
- Phylum: Arthropoda
- Clade: Pancrustacea
- Class: Insecta
- Order: Lepidoptera
- Family: Tortricidae
- Genus: Cochylis
- Species: C. sagittigera

Binomial name
- Cochylis sagittigera Razowski & Becker, 1983

Species of moth

Cochylis sagittigera is a species of moth of the family Tortricidae. It is found in Mato Grosso, Brazil. They are nocturnal.
