= Cochylis parallelana =

Scientific classification
- Kingdom: Animalia
- Phylum: Arthropoda
- Clade: Pancrustacea
- Class: Insecta
- Order: Lepidoptera
- Family: Tortricidae
- Genus: Cochylis
- Species: C. parallelana

Binomial name
- Cochylis parallelana Walsingham, 1879

Synonyms
- Cochylis paralellana Razowski, 1964

Species of moth

Cochylis parallelana is a species of moth of the family Tortricidae. It is found in the United States, where it has been recorded from coastal California.

Adults have been recorded on wing from April to June and from August to September.
