= Cochylis eutheta =

Scientific classification
- Kingdom: Animalia
- Phylum: Arthropoda
- Clade: Pancrustacea
- Class: Insecta
- Order: Lepidoptera
- Family: Tortricidae
- Genus: Cochylis
- Species: C. eutheta

Binomial name
- Cochylis eutheta Razowski, 1984

Species of moth

Cochylis eutheta is a species of moth of the family Tortricidae. It is found in Mexico in the states of Veracruz and Tamaulipas.
