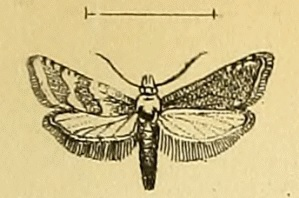

Scientific classification
- Kingdom: Animalia
- Phylum: Arthropoda
- Clade: Pancrustacea
- Class: Insecta
- Order: Lepidoptera
- Family: Tortricidae
- Genus: Cochylis
- Species: C. defessana

Binomial name
- Cochylis defessana Mann, 1861

Synonyms
- Cochylis centaureana Staudinger, 1880

= Cochylis defessana =

Species of moth

Cochylis defessana is a species of moth of the family Tortricidae. It is found in Bulgaria, Romania, Greece, China (Xinjiang), Iran and Turkey.

The wingspan is 9–15 mm. Adults are on wing from July to August.

The larvae feed on Centaurea divergens. Larvae can be found from May to July.
