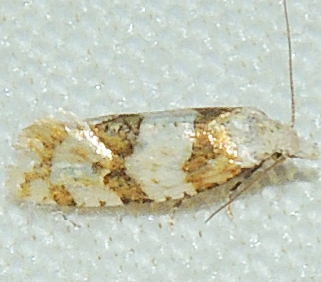

Scientific classification
- Kingdom: Animalia
- Phylum: Arthropoda
- Clade: Pancrustacea
- Class: Insecta
- Order: Lepidoptera
- Family: Tortricidae
- Genus: Cochylis
- Species: C. ringsi

Binomial name
- Cochylis ringsi Metzler, 1999

= Cochylis ringsi =

Species of moth

Cochylis ringsi, Rings' cochylid moth, is a species of moth of the family Tortricidae. It is found in the United States, where it has been recorded from Iowa and Texas to Maryland and Florida.

The length of the forewings is 4.5-7.3 mm for males and 5-5.7 mm for females. Adults have been recorded on wing from April to September.
