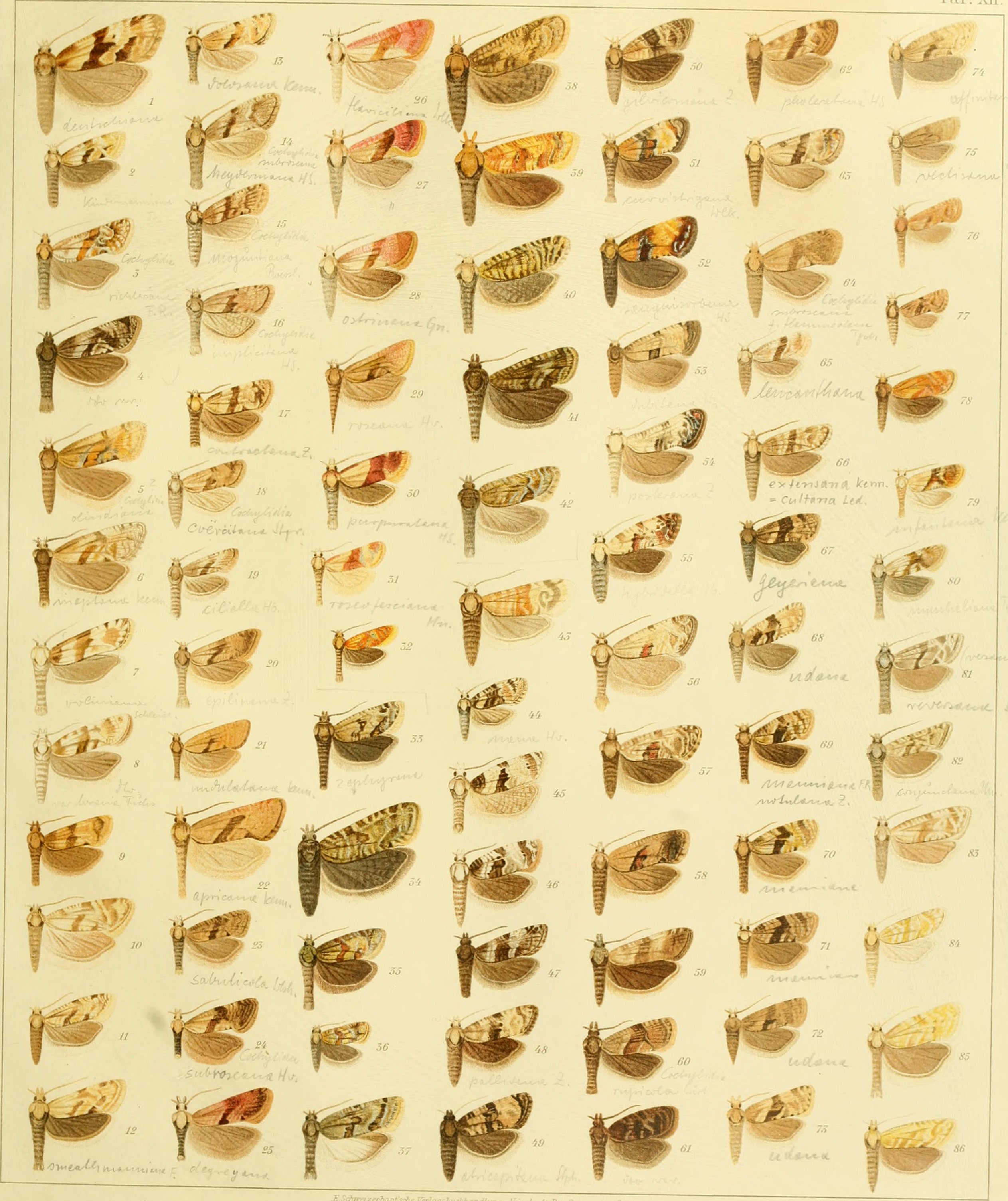
- in Kennel Die palaearktischen tortriciden figure 47 female, 59 female

Scientific classification
- Kingdom: Animalia
- Phylum: Arthropoda
- Clade: Pancrustacea
- Class: Insecta
- Order: Lepidoptera
- Family: Tortricidae
- Genus: Cochylis
- Species: C. morosana

Binomial name
- Cochylis morosana Kennel, 1899

Synonyms
- Cochylis subobscurana Kennel, 1900

= Cochylis morosana =

Species of insect

Cochylis morosana is a species of moth of the family Tortricidae. It is found in Central Asia (Usgent, Alai, Pamir).
