= Cochylis discana =

Scientific classification
- Kingdom: Animalia
- Phylum: Arthropoda
- Clade: Pancrustacea
- Class: Insecta
- Order: Lepidoptera
- Family: Tortricidae
- Genus: Cochylis
- Species: C. discana

Binomial name
- Cochylis discana (Kearfott, 1907)

Synonyms
- Phalonia discana Kearfott, 1907; Thyraylia discana; Phalonia cricota Meyrick, 1912

Species of moth

Cochylis discana is a species of moth of the family Tortricidae. It is found in the United States, where it has been recorded in Illinois, Maryland and Ohio.

The wingspan is about 12 mm. Adults have been recorded on wing in June and August.
