= Cochylis aestiva =

Scientific classification
- Kingdom: Animalia
- Phylum: Arthropoda
- Clade: Pancrustacea
- Class: Insecta
- Order: Lepidoptera
- Family: Tortricidae
- Genus: Cochylis
- Species: C. aestiva

Binomial name
- Cochylis aestiva (Walsingham, 1900)

Synonyms
- Phalonia aestiva Walsingham, 1900

Species of moth

Cochylis aestiva is a species of moth of the family Tortricidae. It is found in northern Syria.
