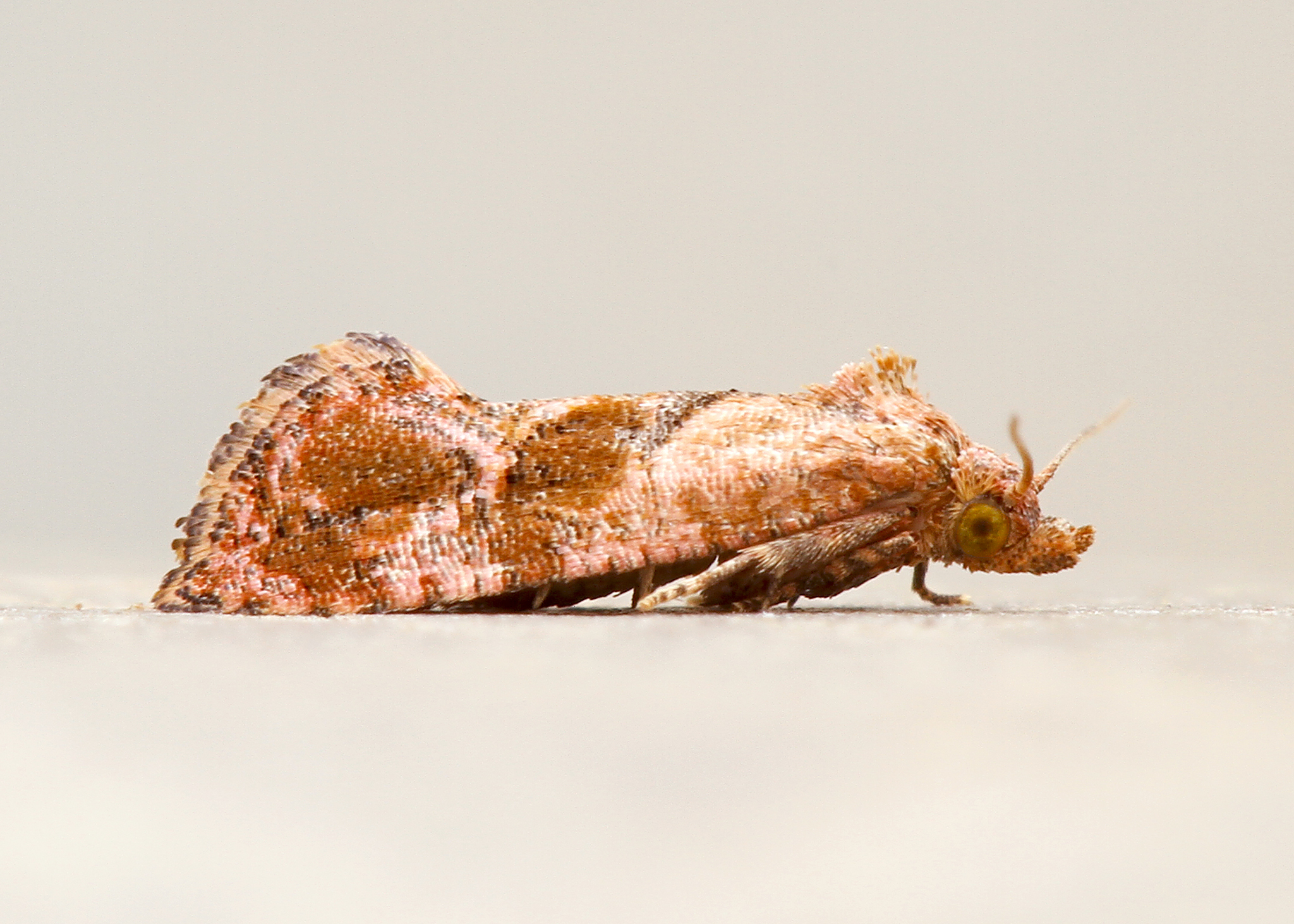

Scientific classification
- Domain: Eukaryota
- Kingdom: Animalia
- Phylum: Arthropoda
- Class: Insecta
- Order: Lepidoptera
- Family: Tortricidae
- Subfamily: Tortricinae
- Tribe: Cochylini
- Genus: Cochylichroa
- Species: C. aurorana

Binomial name
- Cochylichroa aurorana (Kearfott, 1907)

Synonyms
- Phalonia aurorana Kearfott, 1907; Aethes aurorana

= Cochylichroa aurorana =

Species of moth

Cochylichroa aurorana is a species of moth of the family Tortricidae. It is found in the United States, where it has been recorded from Connecticut, Indiana, Maine, Maryland, Massachusetts, New Jersey, Ohio and Oklahoma.

The wingspan is 11–12 mm. Adults are on wing from August to September.

Cochylichroa aurorana was formerly a member of the genus Cochylis, but was moved to the redefined genus Cochylichroa in 2019 as a result of phylogenetic analysis.
