= Cochylis philypna =

Scientific classification
- Kingdom: Animalia
- Phylum: Arthropoda
- Clade: Pancrustacea
- Class: Insecta
- Order: Lepidoptera
- Family: Tortricidae
- Genus: Cochylis
- Species: C. philypna

Binomial name
- Cochylis philypna Razowski & Becker, 1994

Species of moth

Cochylis philypna is a species of moth of the family Tortricidae. It is found in Brazil, where it is found from Minas Gerais to Goias.
