= Cochylis heratana =

Scientific classification
- Kingdom: Animalia
- Phylum: Arthropoda
- Clade: Pancrustacea
- Class: Insecta
- Order: Lepidoptera
- Family: Tortricidae
- Genus: Cochylis
- Species: C. heratana

Binomial name
- Cochylis heratana Razowski, 1967

Synonyms
- Cochylis heratna Razowski, 1968

Species of moth

Cochylis heratana is a species of moth of the family Tortricidae. It is found in Afghanistan.
