= Cochylis flabilis =

Scientific classification
- Kingdom: Animalia
- Phylum: Arthropoda
- Clade: Pancrustacea
- Class: Insecta
- Order: Lepidoptera
- Family: Tortricidae
- Genus: Cochylis
- Species: C. flabilis

Binomial name
- Cochylis flabilis Razowski, 1993

Species of moth

Cochylis flabilis is a species of moth of the family Tortricidae. It is found in Baja California, Mexico.
