= Cochylis carmelana =

Scientific classification
- Kingdom: Animalia
- Phylum: Arthropoda
- Clade: Pancrustacea
- Class: Insecta
- Order: Lepidoptera
- Family: Tortricidae
- Genus: Cochylis
- Species: C. carmelana

Binomial name
- Cochylis carmelana (Kearfott, 1907)

Synonyms
- Phalonia carmelana Kearfott, 1907; Phalonia carmelana var. obispoana Kearfott, 1907

Species of moth

Cochylis carmelana is a species of moth of the family Tortricidae. It is found in the United States, where it has been recorded along the coast of California.

The wingspan is about 13 mm. Adults have been recorded on wing in February and April.
