= Cochylis dormitoria =

Scientific classification
- Kingdom: Animalia
- Phylum: Arthropoda
- Clade: Pancrustacea
- Class: Insecta
- Order: Lepidoptera
- Family: Tortricidae
- Genus: Cochylis
- Species: C. dormitoria

Binomial name
- Cochylis dormitoria Razowski, 1997

Species of moth

Cochylis dormitoria is a species of moth of the family Tortricidae. It is found in Canada, including Ontario.
