= Cochylis maestana =

Scientific classification
- Kingdom: Animalia
- Phylum: Arthropoda
- Clade: Pancrustacea
- Class: Insecta
- Order: Lepidoptera
- Family: Tortricidae
- Genus: Cochylis
- Species: C. maestana

Binomial name
- Cochylis maestana Kennel, 1899

Synonyms
- Euxanthis suleimana Osthelder, 1938

Species of moth

Cochylis maestana is a species of moth of the family Tortricidae. It is found in northern Iran (Elburz Mountains, Shahkuh, Takht-e Soleymān), eastern Afghanistan and eastern Asia Minor.
