= Cochylichroa arthuri =

Scientific classification
- Domain: Eukaryota
- Kingdom: Animalia
- Phylum: Arthropoda
- Class: Insecta
- Order: Lepidoptera
- Family: Tortricidae
- Subfamily: Tortricinae
- Tribe: Cochylini
- Genus: Cochylichroa
- Species: C. arthuri

Binomial name
- Cochylichroa arthuri (Dang, 1984)

Species of moth

Cochylichroa arthuri, Arthur’s sunflower moth, is a species of moth of the family Tortricidae. It is found in North America, where it has been recorded from Saskatchewan, Manitoba, North Dakota, Indiana, Minnesota, Montana and Ohio.

The wingspan is 12 mm. Adults are on wing from July to September.

The larvae feed within the heads and on the seeds of Helianthus annuus.

Cochylichroa arthuri was formerly a member of the genus Cochylis, but was moved to the redefined genus Cochylichroa in 2019 as a result of phylogenetic analysis.
