= Cochylis disputabilis =

Scientific classification
- Kingdom: Animalia
- Phylum: Arthropoda
- Clade: Pancrustacea
- Class: Insecta
- Order: Lepidoptera
- Family: Tortricidae
- Genus: Cochylis
- Species: C. disputabilis

Binomial name
- Cochylis disputabilis (Walsingham, 1914)

Synonyms
- Phalonia disputabilis Walsingham, 1914

Species of moth

Cochylis disputabilis is a species of moth of the family Tortricidae. It is found in Guerrero, Mexico.
