= Cochylis bunteana =

Scientific classification
- Kingdom: Animalia
- Phylum: Arthropoda
- Clade: Pancrustacea
- Class: Insecta
- Order: Lepidoptera
- Family: Tortricidae
- Genus: Cochylis
- Species: C. bunteana

Binomial name
- Cochylis bunteana Robinson, 1869

Synonyms
- Thyraylia bunteana

Species of moth

Cochylis bunteana is a species of moth of the family Tortricidae. It is found in North America, where it has been recorded from Florida, Illinois, Kentucky, Maine, Maryland, Minnesota, Montana, Ohio, Oklahoma, Ontario and Tennessee.

Adults have been recorded on wing in March and from June to October.
