= Cochylis securifera =

Scientific classification
- Kingdom: Animalia
- Phylum: Arthropoda
- Clade: Pancrustacea
- Class: Insecta
- Order: Lepidoptera
- Family: Tortricidae
- Genus: Cochylis
- Species: C. securifera

Binomial name
- Cochylis securifera Razowski & Becker, 1983

Species of moth

Cochylis securifera is a species of moth of the family Tortricidae. It is found in Brazil in the states of Espírito Santo and Paraná. The type locality is Quatro Barras, Paraná. Additional specimens have been recorded from Linhares, Espírito Santo (400 m, September).
