= Cochylichroa foxcana =

Scientific classification
- Kingdom: Animalia
- Phylum: Arthropoda
- Clade: Pancrustacea
- Class: Insecta
- Order: Lepidoptera
- Family: Tortricidae
- Subfamily: Tortricinae
- Tribe: Cochylini
- Genus: Cochylichroa
- Species: C. foxcana

Binomial name
- Cochylichroa foxcana (Kearfott, 1907)

Species of moth

Cochylichroa foxcana is a species of tortricid moth in the family Tortricidae, found in North America.
