= Cochylis serrana =

Scientific classification
- Kingdom: Animalia
- Phylum: Arthropoda
- Clade: Pancrustacea
- Class: Insecta
- Order: Lepidoptera
- Family: Tortricidae
- Genus: Cochylis
- Species: C. serrana

Binomial name
- Cochylis serrana Razowski & Becker, 2007

Species of moth

Cochylis serrana is a species of moth of the family Tortricidae. It is found in Minas Gerais, Brazil.

The wingspan is about 10.5 mm.

== Etymology ==
The species name refers to the type locality, Serra do Cipó.
