= Cochylis anerista =

Scientific classification
- Kingdom: Animalia
- Phylum: Arthropoda
- Clade: Pancrustacea
- Class: Insecta
- Order: Lepidoptera
- Family: Tortricidae
- Genus: Cochylis
- Species: C. anerista

Binomial name
- Cochylis anerista Razowski, 1984

Species of insect

Cochylis anerista is a species of moth of the family Tortricidae. It is found in Puebla, Mexico.
