= Cochylichroa temerana =

Scientific classification
- Domain: Eukaryota
- Kingdom: Animalia
- Phylum: Arthropoda
- Class: Insecta
- Order: Lepidoptera
- Family: Tortricidae
- Subfamily: Tortricinae
- Tribe: Cochylini
- Genus: Cochylichroa
- Species: C. temerana

Binomial name
- Cochylichroa temerana (Busck, 1907)

Synonyms
- Phalonia temerana Busck, 1907; Phalonia cincinnatana Kearfott, 1907

Species of moth

Cochylichroa temerana is a species of moth of the family Tortricidae. It is found in North America, where it has been recorded from Connecticut, Illinois, Indiana, Kentucky, Louisiana, Maine, Maryland, Massachusetts, Minnesota, New Brunswick, Ohio, Oklahoma, Ontario, Pennsylvania, Quebec and Tennessee.

The wingspan is 11–13 mm. Adults have been recorded on wing from March to August.

Cochylichroa temerana was formerly a member of the genus Cochylis, but was moved to the redefined genus Cochylichroa in 2019 as a result of phylogenetic analysis.
