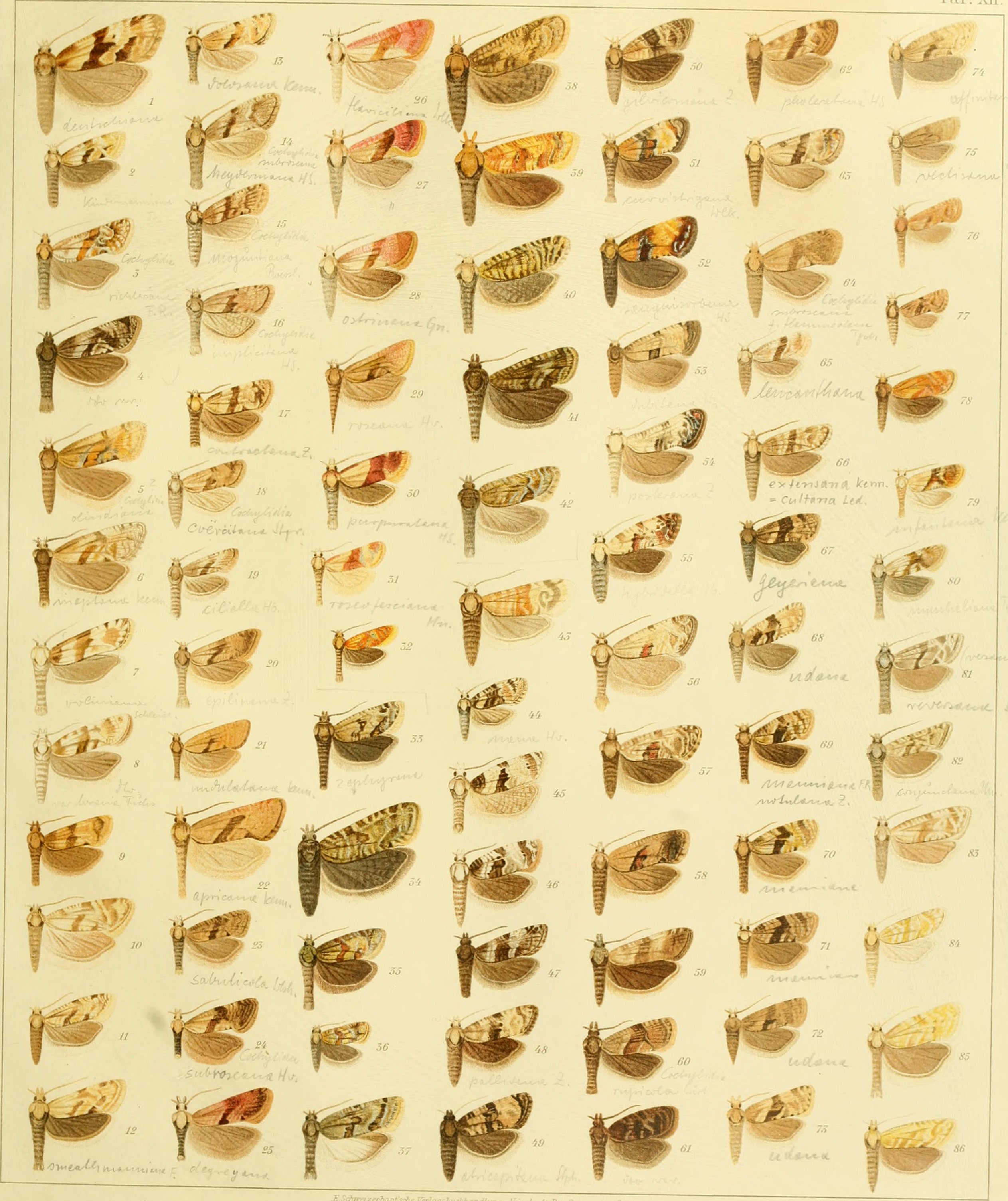
- in Kennel Die palaearktischen tortriciden figure 21 male, 29 female

Scientific classification
- Kingdom: Animalia
- Phylum: Arthropoda
- Clade: Pancrustacea
- Class: Insecta
- Order: Lepidoptera
- Family: Tortricidae
- Genus: Cochylis
- Species: C. roseana

Binomial name
- Cochylis roseana (Haworth, [1811])

Synonyms
- Tortrix roseana Haworth, [1811]; Cochylis dipsaceana Duponchel, in Godart, 1842; Tortrix rubellana Hubner, 1823; Cochylis undulatana Kennel, 1899

= Cochylis roseana =

Species of moth

Cochylis roseana is a moth of the family Tortricidae. It is found in most of Europe (except Ireland, Fennoscandia, the Baltic region, Portugal and Greece), Uralsk, Iran, Asia Minor and China (Gansu).

The wingspan is 10–17 millimetres (0.39–0.67 in). The forewing costa is nearly straight; light yellow-ochreous, towards costa and posteriorly suffused with rose-pink and with a ferruginous-ochreous median fascia, becoming obsolete towards costa, dorsally sprinkled with dark fuscous; cilia yellow-ochreous, with a dark fuscous subapical line. Hindwings light gre

The larvae feed on Dipsacus sylvestris, Chrysocoma and Solidago. Larvae can be found from August to May. The larva is pale green with the head and plate of 2 black.
