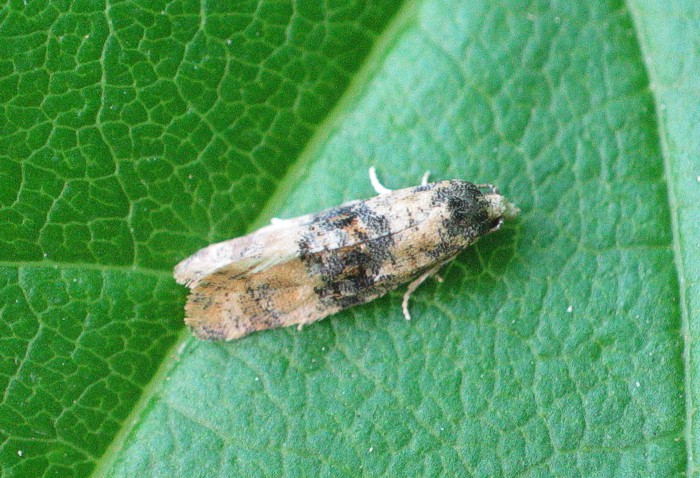

Scientific classification
- Domain: Eukaryota
- Kingdom: Animalia
- Phylum: Arthropoda
- Class: Insecta
- Order: Lepidoptera
- Family: Tortricidae
- Genus: Cochylis
- Species: C. nana

Binomial name
- Cochylis nana (Haworth, 1811)

Synonyms
- Tortrix nana Haworth, [1811]; Thyraylia nana; Simaethis albidana Walker, 1866; Conchylis altocorsicana Petry, 1904; Eupoecilia carneana Guenée, 1845; Eupoecilia cruentana Guenée, 1845; Eupoecilia cruentana Guenée, 1845; Penthina ochreoalbana Walker, 1863; Cochylis pallidana Herrich-Schäffer, 1847; Tortrix (Cochylis) pallidana Herrich-Schäffer, 1851; Cochylis pumillana Herrich-Schäffer, 1847; Phalonia winniana Kearfott, 1905

= Cochylis nana =

Species of moth

Cochylis nana is a moth of the family Tortricidae. It was described by Adrian Hardy Haworth in 1811. It is found in Europe, Amur Oblast of Russia and Nova Scotia in Canada.

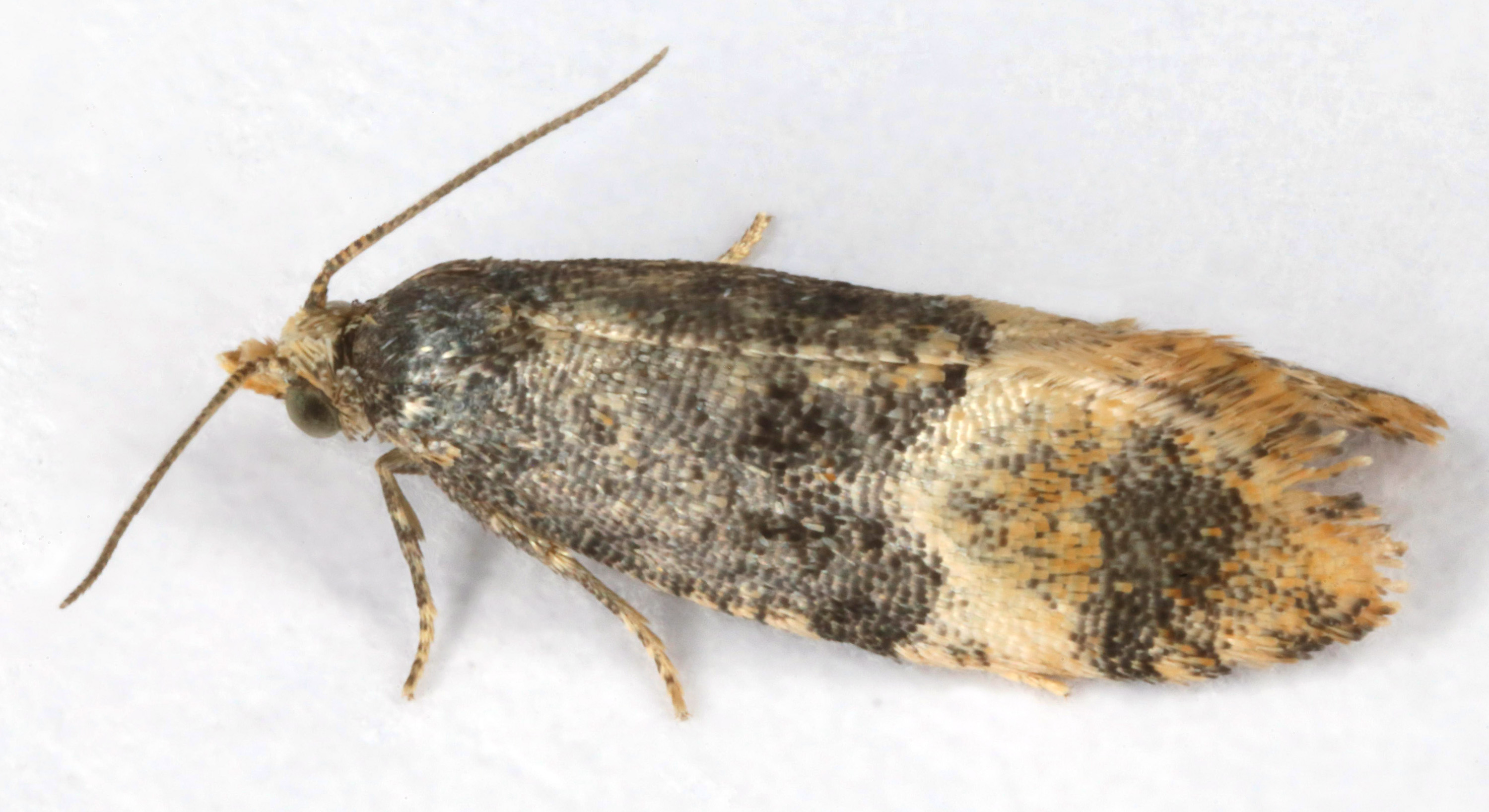

The wingspan is 9–12 millimetres (0.35–0.47 in).The head is white. The forewing costa is gently arched. The ground colour is white. The basal area and costa are strigulated with blackish. There is a broad direct median fascia of blackish irroration and strigulae, dilated dorsally, the posterior edge sinuate. The apical area is clouded with pale ochreous, with a suffused spot of blackish irroration on costa before the apex, sometimes indistinctly connected with the tornus. The cilia are pale ochreous, with indistinct bars of blackish irroration. The hindwings are pale grey. Julius von Kennel provides a full description.

The moth flies from mid-April to mid-June.

The larvae feed on birch species.
