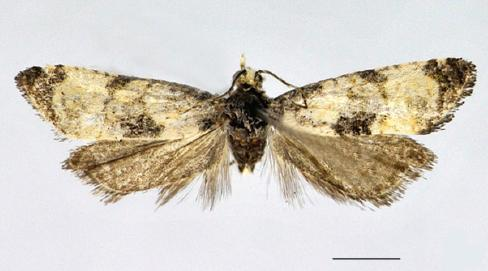

Scientific classification
- Kingdom: Animalia
- Phylum: Arthropoda
- Clade: Pancrustacea
- Class: Insecta
- Order: Lepidoptera
- Family: Tortricidae
- Genus: Cochylis
- Species: C. dubitana

Binomial name
- Cochylis dubitana (Hübner, [1799])

Synonyms
- Tortrix dubitana Hübner, [1799]; Tortrix ambiguana Frölich, 1828; Lobesia baseirufana Bruand, 1850; Simaethis albidana Walker, 1866; Cochylis islandicana Björnsson, 1968; Neocochylis dubitana (Hübner, [1799])

= Cochylis dubitana =

Species of moth

Cochylis dubitana, the little conch, is a moth of the family Tortricidae. It is found in China (Heilongjiang), most of Europe, and in the Caucasus. It is also found in North America, where it has been recorded from Colorado, Maine, Ontario and Washington.

The wingspan is 11–16 mm. The head is white and the thorax dark grey. The forewing costa is gently arched. The ground colour is ochreous whitish or rosy -whitish, the costa strigulated with blackish. The small basal patch and the spot on costa touching it are dark grey. An irregular brownish median fascia is dark grey on the costa and dorsum and obliquely interrupted above the middle. There is a pale greyish ochreous cloud above the tornus and a narrow terminal fascia, dilated on costa. The cilia are dark grey, blackish-mixed. The hindwings in males are whitish-grey, in females grey. The larva is whitish; head light red-brown; plate of 2 yellow, black-edged posteriorly. Julius von Kennel provides a full description.

There are two generations per year with adults on wing in June and again in August.

The larvae feed inside the flowers and developing seedheads of various Asteraceae species, including Senecio, Crepis and Hieracium species and Sonchus arvensis and Solidago virgaurea. Larvae can be found in July and from August to April. They overwinter in a cocoon among debris. Pupation takes place from April to July in a cocoon on the ground among debris.
