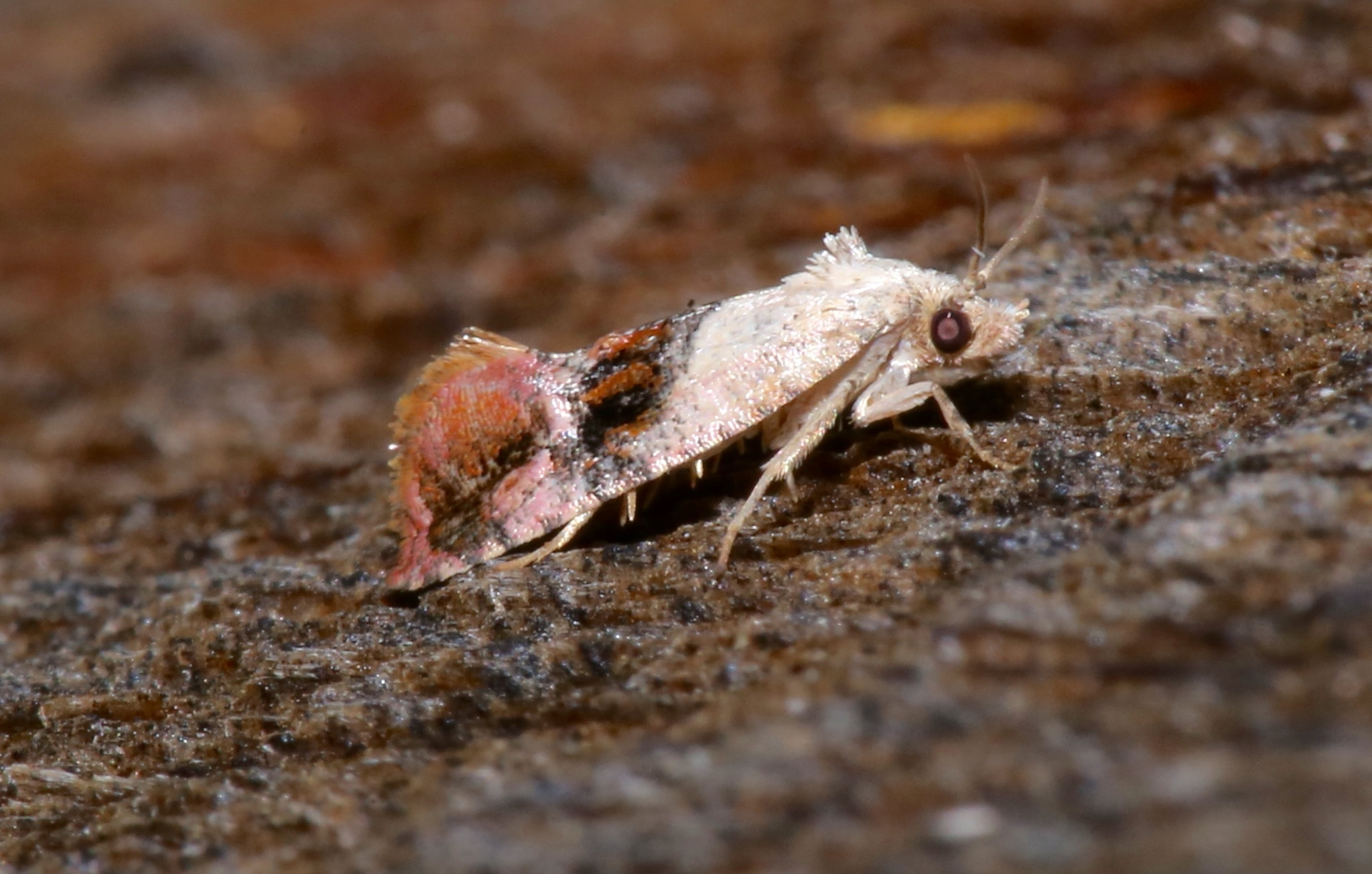

Scientific classification
- Kingdom: Animalia
- Phylum: Arthropoda
- Clade: Pancrustacea
- Class: Insecta
- Order: Lepidoptera
- Family: Tortricidae
- Genus: Cochylis
- Species: C. hollandana

Binomial name
- Cochylis hollandana (Kearfott, 1907)

Synonyms
- Phalonia hollandana Kearfott, 1907; Thyraylia hollandana

= Cochylis hollandana =

Species of moth

Cochylis hollandana, Holland's cochylid moth, is a species of moth of the family Tortricidae. It is found in North America, where it has been recorded from Connecticut, Indiana, Kentucky, Maine, Maryland, New Hampshire, North Carolina, Ohio, Oklahoma, Ontario, Pennsylvania, Quebec, Tennessee and Wisconsin.

The wingspan is 10–12 mm. Adults have been recorded on wing from March to September.
