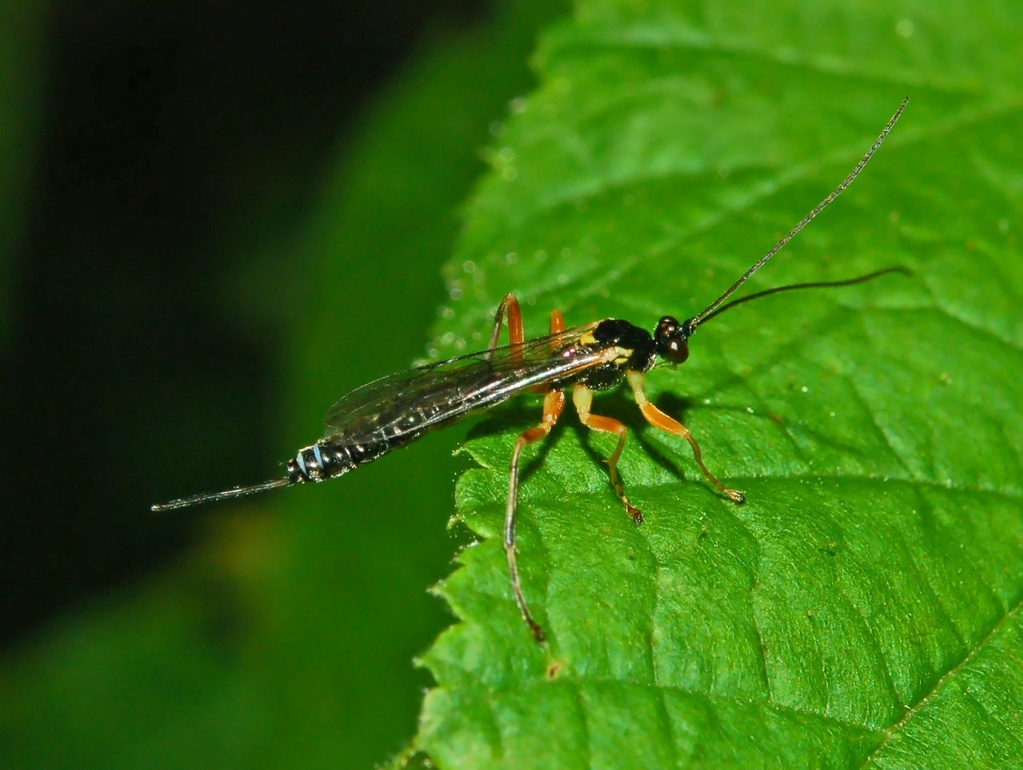
- Polysphincta boops – female

Scientific classification
- Domain: Eukaryota
- Kingdom: Animalia
- Phylum: Arthropoda
- Class: Insecta
- Order: Hymenoptera
- Family: Ichneumonidae
- Genus: Polysphincta
- Species: P. boops

Binomial name
- Polysphincta boops Tschek, 1868

Synonyms
- Polysphincta eltshaninovi Shestakov, 1927

= Polysphincta boops =

Species of wasp

Polysphincta boops is a species belonging to the family Ichneumonidae subfamily Pimplinae.

== Distribution and habitat ==
This species is present in Europe. These insects are mostly arboreal. They inhabit trees and bushes in a wide range of areas.

== Description ==
The adults of Polysphincta boops grow up to 8–11 millimetres (0.31–0.43 in) long, with an ovipositor of 4.3–5 millimetres (0.17–0.20 in). They are among the largest species in the Polysphincta genus-group in Europe. They are characterised by a black body, with yellow scutellum, postscutellum, mandibles and legs. Females show a very long ovipositor.

== Biology ==
This wasp parasitizes exclusively adults of spiders (Araniella species, mainly Araniella cucurbitina and Araniella opisthographa). When the egg deposited by the females hatches, larvae feed on the spiders' hemolymph. These insects overwinter as a small larva on their host.

== Bibliography ==
- Oleksandr Varga, Alexey Reshchikov (2014) - New records of the genus Polysphincta Gravenhorst, 1829 (Hymenoptera: Ichneumonidae: Pimplinae) from the Oriental region.
- Niclas Fritzén, Mark Shaw On the spider parasitoids Polysphincta longa Kasparyan and P. boops Tschek (Hymenoptera, Ichneumonidae, Pimplinae), with the first host records of P. longa
