= Ingrata =

The species name ingrata (Latin for "offensive") is a common element in taxonomic names. Examples include:

Fungi:

- Clavulina ingrata, a species of coral fungus found in Malaysia
- Hygrocybe ingrata, a species of waxcap mushroom found in Europe

Insects:

- Caloptilia ingrata, a species of insect known from Tanzania
- Endothenia ingrata, a species of moth in the genus Endothenia
- Eupithecia ingrata, a synonym of Eupithecia nigrilinea, a species of moth found in central Asia
- Stemmatophora ingrata, a synonym of Hypotia proximalis, a species of snout moth found in Azerbaijan and Pakistan
- Terias ingrata, a synonym of Eurema boisduvaliana, a species of butterfly found from Costa Rica to Mexico
- Trychosis ingrata, a species of wasp found in much of Europe

Plants:

- Acacia ingrata, a species of shrub native to Western Australia
- Michelia ingrata, a species of plant endemic to China
- Myristica Ingrata, a species of tree in the genus Myristica found in Asia and the western Pacific
