= Cucumber green spider =

Cucumber green spider may refer to multiple species of spider in the genus Araniella including:

- Araniella cucurbitina
- Araniella opisthographa
