= Ingrata (disambiguation) =

Ingrata is a common species name.

Ingrata may also refer to:

- Ingrata, a 2001 album by Ram Herrera
- "Ingrata", a song by Mario Roberto Zuñiga
- "La Ingrata", a song by Café Tacuba
