= Hypotia viettei =

Scientific classification
- Kingdom: Animalia
- Phylum: Arthropoda
- Clade: Pancrustacea
- Class: Insecta
- Order: Lepidoptera
- Family: Pyralidae
- Genus: Hypotia
- Species: H. viettei

Binomial name
- Hypotia viettei Leraut, 2004

Species of moth

Hypotia viettei is a species of snout moth in the genus Hypotia, described by Patrice J.A. Leraut in 2004 from Madagascar.
