= Hypotia pectinalis =

Scientific classification
- Kingdom: Animalia
- Phylum: Arthropoda
- Clade: Pancrustacea
- Class: Insecta
- Order: Lepidoptera
- Family: Pyralidae
- Genus: Hypotia
- Species: H. pectinalis

Binomial name
- Hypotia pectinalis (Herrich-Schäffer, 1838)

Synonyms
- Pyralis pectinalis Herrich-Schäffer, 1838; Mnesixena pectinalis; Constantia ocelliferalis Ragonot, 1887; Constantia pectinalis var. jordanalis Rebel, 1903

Species of moth

Hypotia pectinalis is a species of snout moth in the genus Hypotia. It was described by Gottlieb August Wilhelm Herrich-Schäffer in 1838, and it is known from Spain, Sardinia, Corsica, Sicily, Israel, the Palestinian territories and Tunisia.
