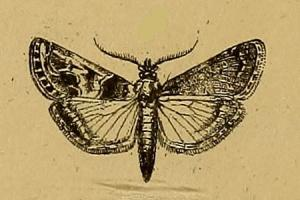

Scientific classification
- Kingdom: Animalia
- Phylum: Arthropoda
- Clade: Pancrustacea
- Class: Insecta
- Order: Lepidoptera
- Family: Pyralidae
- Genus: Hypotia
- Species: H. infulalis

Binomial name
- Hypotia infulalis Lederer, 1858

Synonyms
- Constantia atrisquamalis Hampson, 1900; Constantia inclinatalis Rebel, 1914; Dattinia staudingeralis Ragonot, 1891

= Hypotia infulalis =

Species of moth

Hypotia infulalis is a species of snout moth in the genus Hypotia. It was described by Julius Lederer in 1858 and is known from Spain, Portugal, Sardinia, Syria and Algeria.
