= Hypotia rectangula =

Scientific classification
- Kingdom: Animalia
- Phylum: Arthropoda
- Clade: Pancrustacea
- Class: Insecta
- Order: Lepidoptera
- Family: Pyralidae
- Genus: Hypotia
- Species: H. rectangula

Binomial name
- Hypotia rectangula (Amsel, 1949)

Synonyms
- Dattinia rectangula Amsel, 1949

Species of moth

Hypotia rectangula is a species of snout moth in the genus Hypotia. It was described by Hans Georg Amsel in 1949 and is known from Iran.
