= Hypotia dinteri =

Scientific classification
- Kingdom: Animalia
- Phylum: Arthropoda
- Clade: Pancrustacea
- Class: Insecta
- Order: Lepidoptera
- Family: Pyralidae
- Genus: Hypotia
- Species: H. dinteri

Binomial name
- Hypotia dinteri Grünberg, 1910

Species of moth

Hypotia dinteri is a species of snout moth in the genus Hypotia. It was described by Karl Grünberg in 1910 and is known from Namibia.
