= Hypotia numidalis =

Scientific classification
- Kingdom: Animalia
- Phylum: Arthropoda
- Clade: Pancrustacea
- Class: Insecta
- Order: Lepidoptera
- Family: Pyralidae
- Genus: Hypotia
- Species: H. numidalis

Binomial name
- Hypotia numidalis (Hampson, 1900)

Synonyms
- Constantia numidalis Hampson, 1900

Species of moth

Hypotia numidalis is a species of snout moth in the genus Hypotia. It was described by George Hampson in 1900. It is found in Spain, Algeria and Syria.

The wingspan is about 30 mm. Adults are white, irrorated (sprinkled) with dark brown and fuscous.
