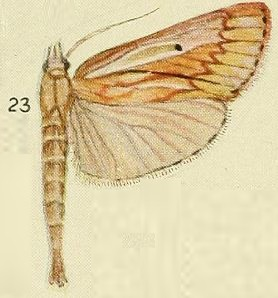
- Hypotia perstrigata

Scientific classification
- Kingdom: Animalia
- Phylum: Arthropoda
- Clade: Pancrustacea
- Class: Insecta
- Order: Lepidoptera
- Family: Pyralidae
- Genus: Hypotia
- Species: H. perstrigata

Binomial name
- Hypotia perstrigata (Hampson, 1916)

Synonyms
- Dattinia perstrigata Hampson, 1916 Ham

= Hypotia perstrigata =

Species of snout moth

Hypotia perstrigata is a species of snout moth in the genus Hypotia.

I it is known from Kenya and Somalia.
