= Hypotia bolinalis =

Scientific classification
- Kingdom: Animalia
- Phylum: Arthropoda
- Class: Insecta
- Order: Lepidoptera
- Family: Pyralidae
- Genus: Hypotia
- Species: H. bolinalis

Binomial name
- Hypotia bolinalis (Walker, 1859)

Synonyms
- Pyralis bolinalis Walker, 1859; Hypotia achatina C. Felder, R. Felder & Rogenhofer, 1875; Scopula semirosealis Walker, 1865

Species of moth

Hypotia bolinalis is a species of snout moth in the genus Hypotia. It was described by Francis Walker in 1859. It is found in South Africa.
