= Hypotia bertazii =

Scientific classification
- Kingdom: Animalia
- Phylum: Arthropoda
- Clade: Pancrustacea
- Class: Insecta
- Order: Lepidoptera
- Family: Pyralidae
- Genus: Hypotia
- Species: H. bertazii

Binomial name
- Hypotia bertazii (Turati, 1926)

Synonyms
- Constantia bertazii Turati, 1926

Species of moth

Hypotia bertazii is a species of snout moth in the genus Hypotia. It was described by Turati in 1926, and is known from Libya.
