= Hypotia opiparalis =

Scientific classification
- Kingdom: Animalia
- Phylum: Arthropoda
- Clade: Pancrustacea
- Class: Insecta
- Order: Lepidoptera
- Family: Pyralidae
- Genus: Hypotia
- Species: H. opiparalis

Binomial name
- Hypotia opiparalis (C. Swinhoe, 1890)

Synonyms
- Zonora opiparalis C. Swinhoe, 1890

Species of moth

Hypotia opiparalis is a species of snout moth in the genus Hypotia. It was described by Charles Swinhoe in 1890 and is known from India.
