= Hypotia vulgaris =

Scientific classification
- Kingdom: Animalia
- Phylum: Arthropoda
- Clade: Pancrustacea
- Class: Insecta
- Order: Lepidoptera
- Family: Pyralidae
- Genus: Hypotia
- Species: H. vulgaris

Binomial name
- Hypotia vulgaris Butler, 1881

Synonyms
- Constantia benderalis Amsel, 1949; Hypotia vulgaris qatarica Leraut, 2007; Surattha eremialis Swinhoe, 1889

Species of moth

Hypotia vulgaris is a species of snout moth in the genus Hypotia. It was described by Arthur Gardiner Butler in 1881 and is known from India, Pakistan, Iran, Qatar and Saudi Arabia.
