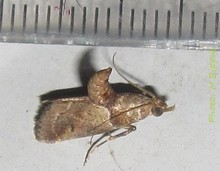
- Hypotia saramitoi

Scientific classification
- Kingdom: Animalia
- Phylum: Arthropoda
- Class: Insecta
- Order: Lepidoptera
- Family: Pyralidae
- Subfamily: Pyralinae
- Tribe: Hypotiini
- Genus: Hypotia; Zeller, 1847

Synonyms
- Boursinella Amsel, 1954; Constantia Ragonot, 1887; Baniura Ragonot, 1891; Buliana Navás, 1913; Ctenarthria Ragonot, 1891; Dattinia Ragonot, 1887; Epizonora Ragonot, 1892; Hercynodes Ragonot, 1895; Macroctenia Hampson, 1900; Macrotenia Collins, 1962; Marionodes Viette, 1953; Mnesixena Meyrick, 1890; Palmitia Ragonot, 1890; Palmita Neave, 1940; Palura Ragonot, 1891; Zonora Swinhoe, 1890

= Hypotia =

Genus of moths

Hypotia is a genus of moths of the family Pyralidae described by Philipp Christoph Zeller in 1847.

== Species ==
- Hypotia aglossalis (Hampson, 1906)
- Hypotia argentalis (Hampson, 1900)
- Hypotia bertazii (Turati, 1926)
- Hypotia bleusei (Oberthür, 1888)
- Hypotia bolinalis (Walker, 1859)
- Hypotia brandbergensis Leraut, 2007
- Hypotia brandti (Amsel, 1949)
- Hypotia chretieni (D. Lucas, 1910)
- Hypotia colchicalis (Herrich-Schäffer, 1851)
- Hypotia colchicaloides (Amsel, 1949)
- Hypotia concatenalis Lederer, 1858
- Hypotia corticalis (Denis & Schiffermüller, 1775)
- Hypotia cribellalis Erschoff, 1874
- Hypotia decembralis Leraut, 2007
- Hypotia diehlalis (Viette, 1953)
- Hypotia difformis (Falkovitsh, 1976)
- Hypotia dinteri Grünberg, 1910
- Hypotia eberti Leraut, 2007
- Hypotia griveaudi Leraut, 2004
- Hypotia grisescens (Warren, 1914)
- Hypotia infulalis Lederer, 1858
- Hypotia khorgosalis (Ragonot, 1891)
- Hypotia leonalis (Oberthür, 1887)
- Hypotia leucographalis (Hampson, 1900)
- Hypotia littoralis Leraut, 2009
- Hypotia lobalis (Chrétien, 1915)
- Hypotia longidentalis (Rothschild, 1913)
- Hypotia mahafalyalis Leraut, 2009
- Hypotia massilialis (Duponchel, 1832)
- Hypotia mavromoustakisi (Rebel, 1928)
- Hypotia metasialis (Amsel, 1954)
- Hypotia meyi Leraut, 2007
- Hypotia miegi (Ragonot, 1895)
- Hypotia mimicralis (Amsel, 1951)
- Hypotia mineti Leraut, 2004
- Hypotia muscosalis (Rebel, 1917)
- Hypotia myalis (Rothschild, 1913)
- Hypotia namibiensis Leraut, 2007
- Hypotia noctua (Falkovitsh, 1976)
- Hypotia numidalis (Hampson, 1900)
- Hypotia opiparalis (Swinhoe, 1890)
- Hypotia opisma (Falkovitsh, 1976)
- Hypotia ornata Druce, 1902
- Hypotia orphna (Falkovitsh, 1976)
- Hypotia oxodontalis (Hampson, 1900)
- Hypotia pectinalis (Herrich-Schäffer, 1838)
- Hypotia persinualis (Hampson, 1900)
- Hypotia perstrigata (Fawcett, 1916)
- Hypotia proximalis Christoph, 1882
- Hypotia rectangula (Amsel, 1949)
- Hypotia saramitoi (Guillermet, 1996)
- Hypotia seyrigalis (Viette, 1953)
- Hypotia sinaica (Rebel, 1903)
- Hypotia speciosalis Christoph, 1885
- Hypotia syrtalis (Ragonot, 1887)
- Hypotia theopoldi (Amsel, 1956)
- Hypotia viettei Leraut, 2004
- Hypotia vulgaris Butler, 1881
