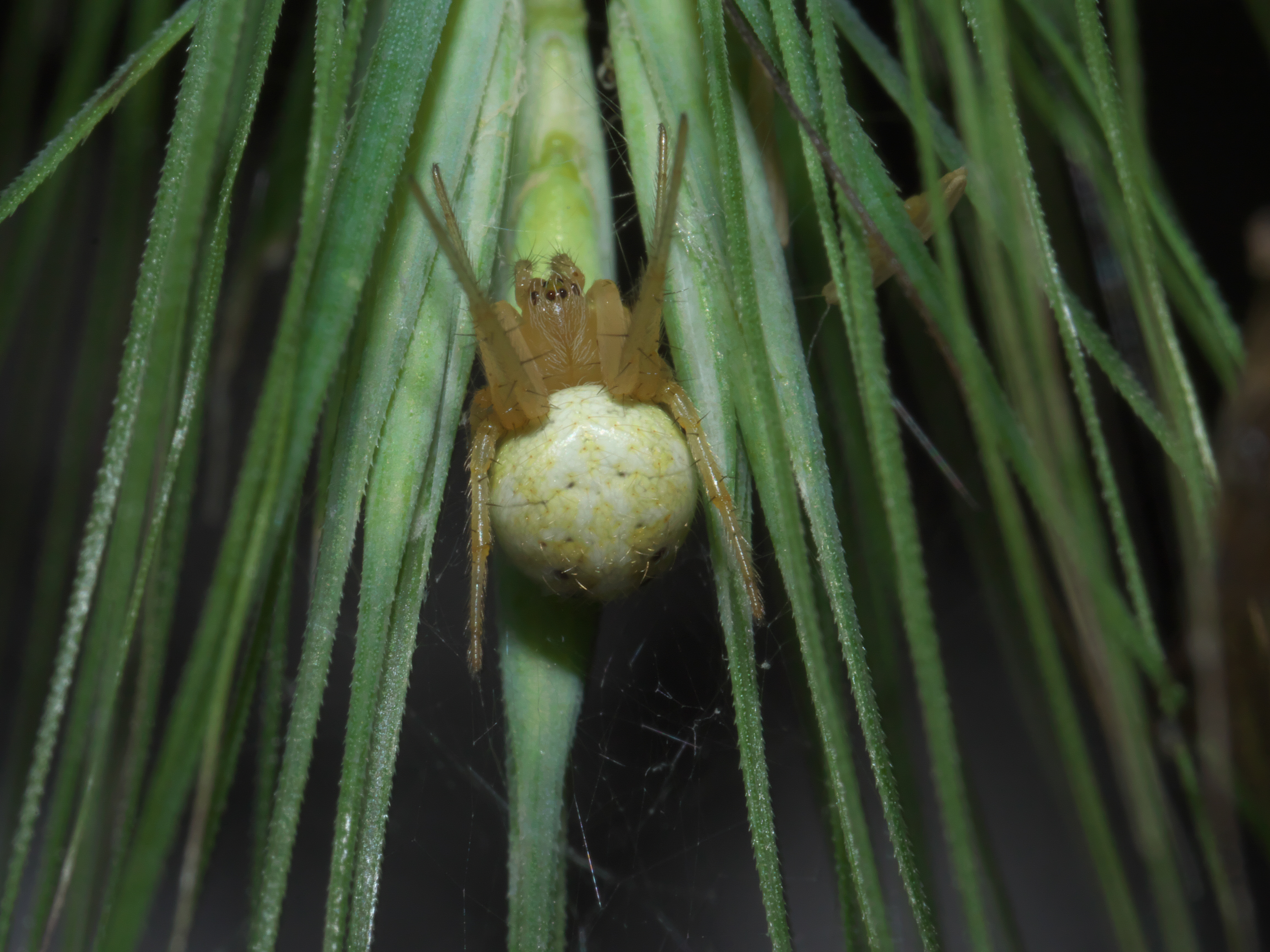

Conservation status
- Secure (NatureServe)

Scientific classification
- Kingdom: Animalia
- Phylum: Arthropoda
- Subphylum: Chelicerata
- Class: Arachnida
- Order: Araneae
- Infraorder: Araneomorphae
- Family: Araneidae
- Genus: Araniella
- Species: A. displicata

Binomial name
- Araniella displicata (Hentz, 1847)

= Araniella displicata =

Species of spider

Araniella displicata, the sixspotted orbweaver, is a species of orb weaver in the spider family Araneidae. It is found in North America, Europe, a range from Russia to Kazakhstan, China, Korea, and Japan.
