= Hypotia metasialis =

Scientific classification
- Kingdom: Animalia
- Phylum: Arthropoda
- Clade: Pancrustacea
- Class: Insecta
- Order: Lepidoptera
- Family: Pyralidae
- Genus: Hypotia
- Species: H. metasialis

Binomial name
- Hypotia metasialis (Amsel, 1954)

Synonyms
- Boursinella metasialis Amsel, 1954; Dattinia metasialis

Species of moth

Hypotia metasialis is a species of snout moth in the genus Hypotia. It was described by Hans Georg Amsel in 1954. It is found in Iran.
