= Hypotia diehlalis =

Scientific classification
- Kingdom: Animalia
- Phylum: Arthropoda
- Clade: Pancrustacea
- Class: Insecta
- Order: Lepidoptera
- Family: Pyralidae
- Genus: Hypotia
- Species: H. diehlalis

Binomial name
- Hypotia diehlalis (Viette, 1953)

Synonyms
- Marionodes diehlalis Viette, 1953

Species of moth

Hypotia diehlalis is a species of snout moth in the genus Hypotia. It was described by Viette in 1953, and is known from Madagascar.
