= Hypotia bleusei =

Scientific classification
- Kingdom: Animalia
- Phylum: Arthropoda
- Clade: Pancrustacea
- Class: Insecta
- Order: Lepidoptera
- Family: Pyralidae
- Genus: Hypotia
- Species: H. bleusei

Binomial name
- Hypotia bleusei (Oberthür, 1888)

Synonyms
- Cledeobia bleusei Oberthür, 1888; Cledeobia santschii D. Lucas, 1911

Species of moth

Hypotia bleusei is a species of snout moth in the genus Hypotia. It was described by Oberthür in 1888, and is native to Algeria and Tunisia.
