= Hypotia longidentalis =

Scientific classification
- Kingdom: Animalia
- Phylum: Arthropoda
- Clade: Pancrustacea
- Class: Insecta
- Order: Lepidoptera
- Family: Pyralidae
- Genus: Hypotia
- Species: H. longidentalis

Binomial name
- Hypotia longidentalis (Rothschild, 1913)

Synonyms
- Constantia longidentalis Rothschild, 1913

Species of moth

Hypotia longidentalis is a species of snout moth in the genus Hypotia. It was described by Rothschild in 1913, and is known from Algeria.
