= Araniella tbilisiensis =

Scientific classification
- Kingdom: Animalia
- Phylum: Arthropoda
- Subphylum: Chelicerata
- Class: Arachnida
- Order: Araneae
- Infraorder: Araneomorphae
- Family: Araneidae
- Genus: Araniella
- Species: A. tbilisiensis

Binomial name
- Araniella tbilisiensis (Mcheidze, 1997)

Synonyms
- Araneus tbilisiensis Mcheidze, 1997; Araniella villanii Zamani, Marusik & Šestáková, 2020

Species of spider

Araniella tbilisiensis is a species of spider in the family Araneidae, found in Georgia, Azerbaĳan, Iran, Kazakhstan, Tajikistan or Uzbekistan, and India.

== Description ==
A preserved male specimen was described as having a seemingly faded colour and pattern. Its cephalothorax was generally reddish brown with lighter legs and two darker bands on the carapace. The upper surface of its abdomen was pale, but thought to be green in life, the lower surface dark gray. Its total body length was 4.4 mm (0.17 in), with a carapace of 1.9 mm (0.07 in). A female specimen had a similar coloration, but was larger, with a total body length of 6.0 mm (0.2 in) including a carapace of 2.6 mm (0.10 in).

== Taxonomy ==
The species was originally described by the Georgian arachnologist Tamara Mcheidze in 1997 as Araneus tbilisiensis. In 1998, it was transferred to the genus Araniella. In 2020, the species was considered to be a synonym of A. opisthographa. This was based on its similar morphology and distribution, but without the original type material being examined. A re-examination in 2025 led to the recognition that A. tbilisiensis was distinct from A. opisthographa, and also that A. villanii, first described in 2020, was synonymous.
