= Hypotia persinualis =

Scientific classification
- Kingdom: Animalia
- Phylum: Arthropoda
- Clade: Pancrustacea
- Class: Insecta
- Order: Lepidoptera
- Family: Pyralidae
- Genus: Hypotia
- Species: H. persinualis

Binomial name
- Hypotia persinualis (Hampson, 1900)

Synonyms
- Constantia persinualis Hampson, 1900; Dattinia kasbahella Schmidt, 1934

Species of moth

Hypotia persinualis is a species of snout moth in the genus Hypotia. It was described by George Hampson in 1900, and it is known from Israel, Syria and Morocco.
