= Trychosis ingrata =

Scientific classification
- Kingdom: Animalia
- Phylum: Arthropoda
- Clade: Pancrustacea
- Class: Insecta
- Order: Hymenoptera
- Family: Ichneumonidae
- Genus: Trychosis
- Species: T. ingrata

Binomial name
- Trychosis ingrata Tschek, 1871

Species of wasp

Trychosis ingrata is an insect that belongs to the order Hymenoptera and the family of ichneumon wasps (Ichneumonidae). The scientific name of the species was first published and validated by Carl Tschek in 1871.
