= Hypotia miegi =

Scientific classification
- Kingdom: Animalia
- Phylum: Arthropoda
- Clade: Pancrustacea
- Class: Insecta
- Order: Lepidoptera
- Family: Pyralidae
- Genus: Hypotia
- Species: H. miegi

Binomial name
- Hypotia miegi (Ragonot, 1895)

Synonyms
- Hercynodes miegi Ragonot, 1895

Species of moth

Hypotia miegi is a species of snout moth in the genus Hypotia. It was described by Ragonot in 1895, and is known from Spain.
