= Hypotia colchicalis =

Scientific classification
- Kingdom: Animalia
- Phylum: Arthropoda
- Clade: Pancrustacea
- Class: Insecta
- Order: Lepidoptera
- Family: Pyralidae
- Genus: Hypotia
- Species: H. colchicalis

Binomial name
- Hypotia colchicalis (Herrich-Schäffer, 1851)

Synonyms
- Pyralis colchicalis Herrich-Schäffer, 1851; Constantia anceschii Turati, 1926

Species of moth

Hypotia colchicalis is a species of snout moth in the genus Hypotia. It was described by Gottlieb August Wilhelm Herrich-Schäffer in 1851, and it is known from Portugal, Spain, Libya, Turkey and Russia.

The wingspan is 25–27 mm.
