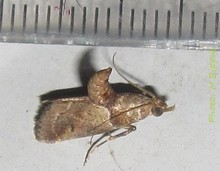

Scientific classification
- Kingdom: Animalia
- Phylum: Arthropoda
- Class: Insecta
- Order: Lepidoptera
- Family: Pyralidae
- Genus: Hypotia
- Species: H. saramitoi

Binomial name
- Hypotia saramitoi Guillermet in Viette & Guillermet, 1996

Synonyms
- Imerina saramitoi Guillermet, 1996

= Hypotia saramitoi =

Species of moth

Hypotia saramitoi is a species of snout moth in the genus Hypotia. It was described by Christian Guillermet in 1996 and is known from Réunion.

It has a length of the forewings of around 10 millimetres (0.39 in).
