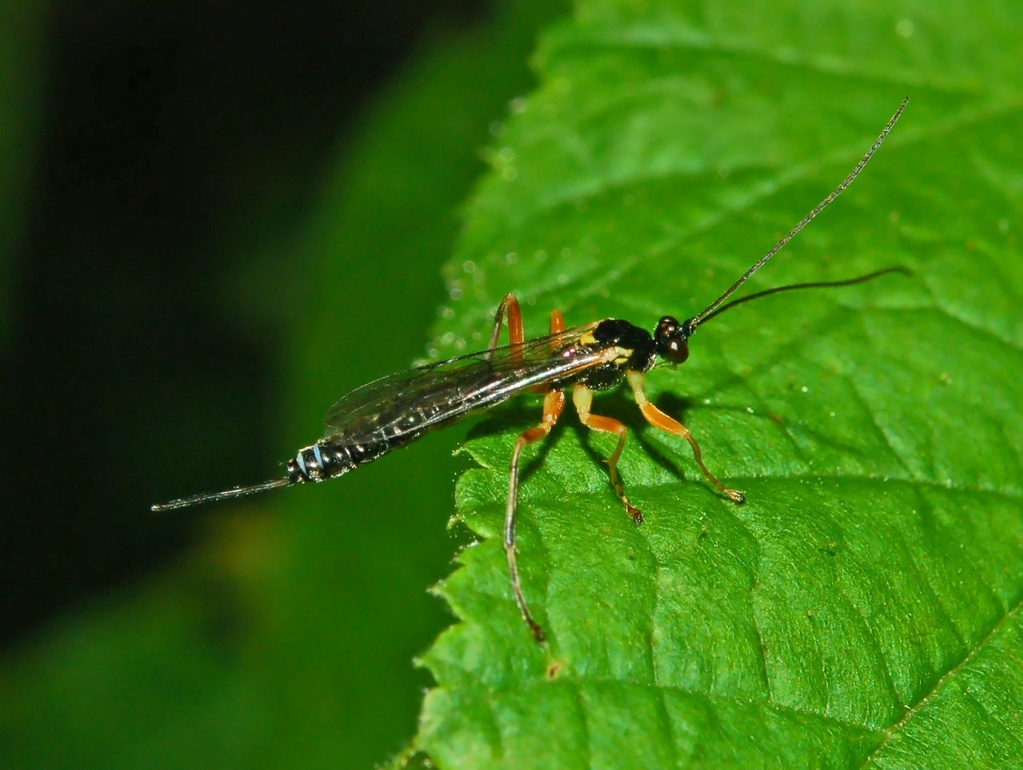
- Polysphincta boops

Scientific classification
- Domain: Eukaryota
- Kingdom: Animalia
- Phylum: Arthropoda
- Class: Insecta
- Order: Hymenoptera
- Family: Ichneumonidae
- Tribe: Ephialtini
- Genus: Polysphincta; Gravenhorst, 1829

= Polysphincta =

Genus of wasps

Polysphincta is a genus belonging to the family Ichneumonidae subfamily Pimplinae.

== Species ==
The genus contains the following species:

- Polysphincta albipes Cresson, 1880
- Polysphincta areolaris Ratzeburg, 1844
- Polysphincta asiatica Kusigemati, 1985
- Polysphincta atavina Cockerell, 1921
- Polysphincta boops Tschek, 1869
- Polysphincta burgessii Cresson, 1870
- Polysphincta dizardi Gauld, 1991
- Polysphincta gutfreundi Gauld, 1991
- Polysphincta inundata Brues, 1910
- Polysphincta janzeni Gauld, 1991
- Polysphincta koebelei Howard, 1892
- Polysphincta latistriata Ratzeburg, 1844
- Polysphincta limata Cresson, 1870
- Polysphincta longa Kasparyan, 1976
- Polysphincta mascoi Gauld, 1991
- Polysphincta mortuaria Brues, 1910
- Polysphincta naranjae Gauld, Ugalde & Hanson, 1998
- Polysphincta petrorum Brues, 1910
- Polysphincta purcelli Gauld, 1991
- Polysphincta rufipes Gravenhorst, 1829
- Polysphincta saxea (Scudder, 1878)
- Polysphincta shabui Gauld, 1991
- Polysphincta statzi (Meunier, 1923)
- Polysphincta thoracica (Cresson, 1874)
- Polysphincta tuberosa Gravenhorst, 1829
- Polysphincta vexator Fitton, Shaw & Gauld, 1988
