= Hypotia mimicralis =

Scientific classification
- Kingdom: Animalia
- Phylum: Arthropoda
- Clade: Pancrustacea
- Class: Insecta
- Order: Lepidoptera
- Family: Pyralidae
- Genus: Hypotia
- Species: H. mimicralis

Binomial name
- Hypotia mimicralis (Amsel, 1951)

Synonyms
- Dattinia mimicralis Amsel, 1951; Rungsina mimicralis

Species of moth

Hypotia mimicralis is a species of snout moth in the genus Hypotia. It was described by Hans Georg Amsel in 1951 and is known from the United Arab Emirates and Iran.
