= Hypotia mavromoustakisi =

Scientific classification
- Kingdom: Animalia
- Phylum: Arthropoda
- Clade: Pancrustacea
- Class: Insecta
- Order: Lepidoptera
- Family: Pyralidae
- Genus: Hypotia
- Species: H. mavromoustakisi

Binomial name
- Hypotia mavromoustakisi (Rebel, 1928)

Synonyms
- Constantia mavromoustakisi Rebel, 1928

Species of moth

Hypotia mavromoustakisi is a species of snout moth in the genus Hypotia. It was described by Rebel in 1928, and is endemic to Cyprus and Israel.
