= Hypotia leucographalis =

Scientific classification
- Kingdom: Animalia
- Phylum: Arthropoda
- Clade: Pancrustacea
- Class: Insecta
- Order: Lepidoptera
- Family: Pyralidae
- Genus: Hypotia
- Species: H. leucographalis

Binomial name
- Hypotia leucographalis (Hampson, 1900)

Synonyms
- Macroctenia leucographalis Hampson, 1900; Constantia leucographalis

Species of moth

Hypotia leucographalis is a species of snout moth in the genus Hypotia. It was described by George Hampson in 1900 and is known from Spain.

The wingspan is about 26 mm. The forewings are fulvous, irrorated (sprinkled) with large erect black scales. The hindwings are white suffused with fuscous.
