= Hypotia speciosalis =

Scientific classification
- Kingdom: Animalia
- Phylum: Arthropoda
- Clade: Pancrustacea
- Class: Insecta
- Order: Lepidoptera
- Family: Pyralidae
- Genus: Hypotia
- Species: H. speciosalis

Binomial name
- Hypotia speciosalis Christoph, 1885

Species of moth

Hypotia speciosalis is a species of snout moth in the genus Hypotia. It was described by Hugo Theodor Christoph in 1885 and is known from Turkmenistan.
