= Hypotia myalis =

Scientific classification
- Kingdom: Animalia
- Phylum: Arthropoda
- Clade: Pancrustacea
- Class: Insecta
- Order: Lepidoptera
- Family: Pyralidae
- Genus: Hypotia
- Species: H. myalis

Binomial name
- Hypotia myalis (Rothschild, 1913)

Synonyms
- Constantia myalis Rothschild, 1913; Constantia faroulti Rothschild, 1915; Dattinia predotae Schawerda, 1934

Species of moth

Hypotia myalis is a species of snout moth in the genus Hypotia. It was described by Rothschild in 1913, and is known from the Canary Islands, the central Sahara desert and Algeria.

The length of the forewings is 9–12 mm for males and 15-16.5 mm for females.
