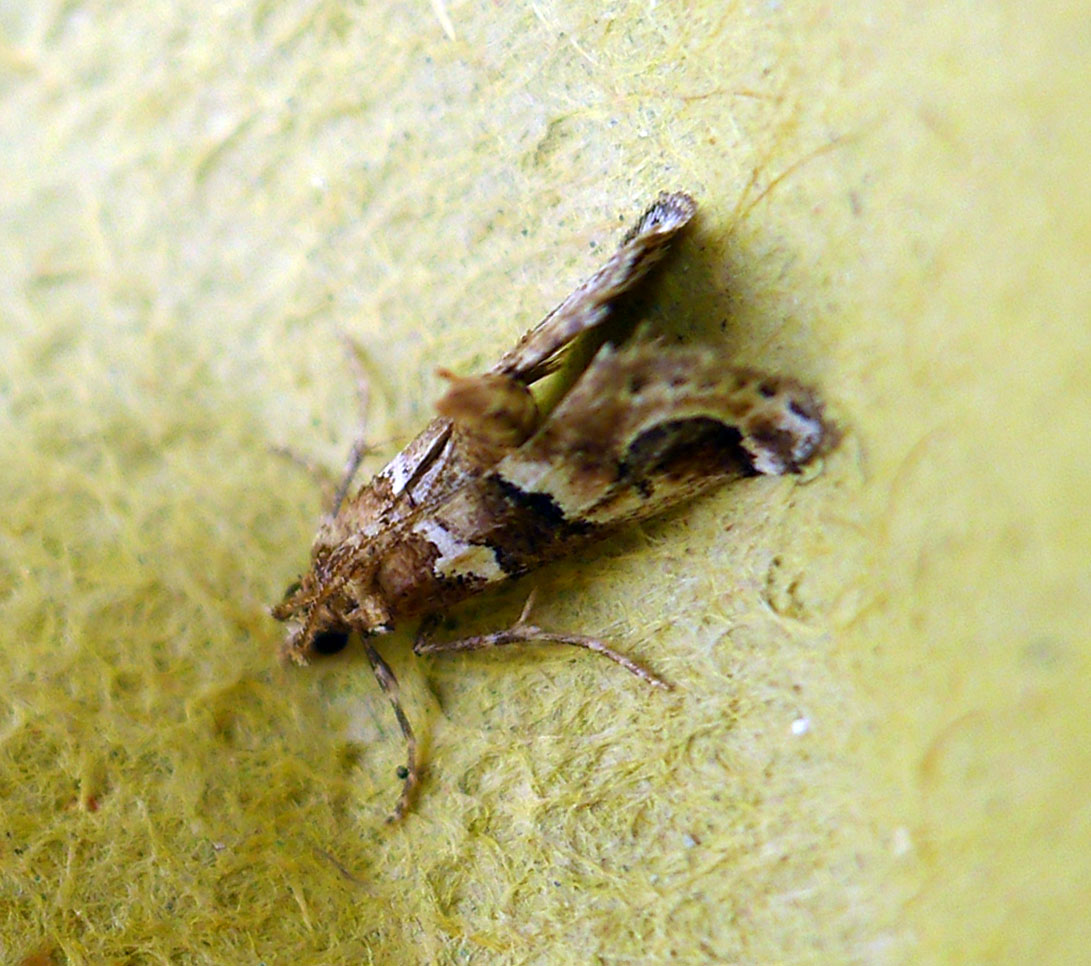

Scientific classification
- Kingdom: Animalia
- Phylum: Arthropoda
- Clade: Pancrustacea
- Class: Insecta
- Order: Lepidoptera
- Family: Pyralidae
- Genus: Hypotia
- Species: H. corticalis

Binomial name
- Hypotia corticalis (Denis & Schiffermüller, 1775)

Synonyms
- Pyralis corticalis Denis & Schiffermüller, 1775

= Hypotia corticalis =

Species of moth

Hypotia corticalis is a species of snout moth in the genus Hypotia. It was described by Michael Denis and Ignaz Schiffermüller in 1775 and is known from France, Spain, Portugal, Italy, Croatia, Greece, Sardinia, Corsica, Sicily, Crete and the Canary Islands.

The wingspan is about 18 mm. The forewings are brownish.
