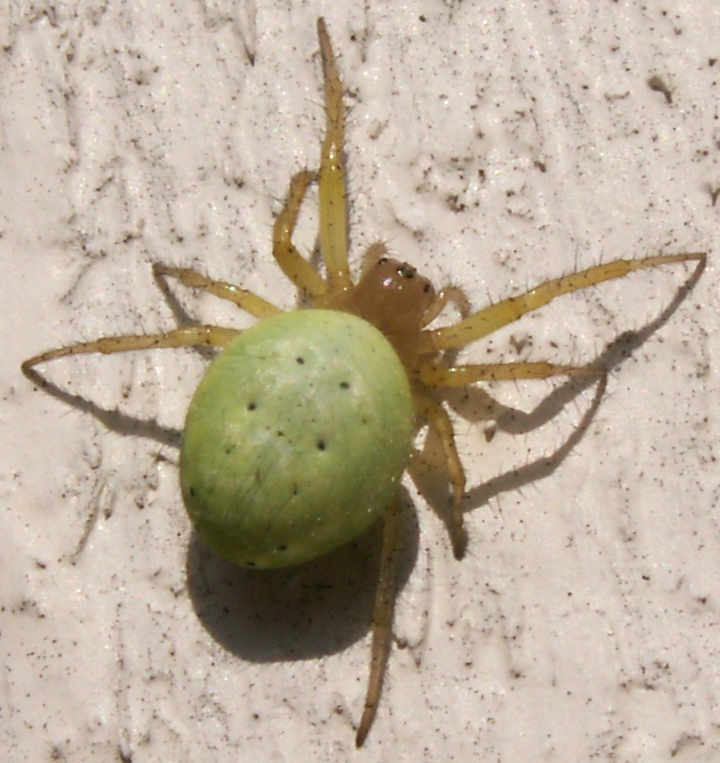

Scientific classification
- Domain: Eukaryota
- Kingdom: Animalia
- Phylum: Arthropoda
- Subphylum: Chelicerata
- Class: Arachnida
- Order: Araneae
- Infraorder: Araneomorphae
- Family: Araneidae
- Genus: Araniella
- Species: A. proxima

Binomial name
- Araniella proxima (Kulczynski, 1885)

= Araniella proxima =

Species of spider

Araniella proxima is a species of orb weaver in the spider family Araneidae. It is found in North America, Europe, a range from Russia (Europe to Far East), Turkey, Iran, and Kazakhstan.
