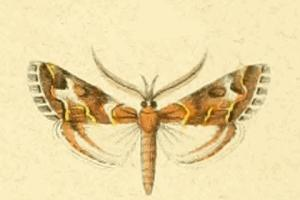

Scientific classification
- Kingdom: Animalia
- Phylum: Arthropoda
- Clade: Pancrustacea
- Class: Insecta
- Order: Lepidoptera
- Family: Pyralidae
- Genus: Hypotia
- Species: H. massilialis

Binomial name
- Hypotia massilialis (Duponchel, 1832)

Synonyms
- Cledeobia massilialis Duponchel, 1832; Palmitia massilialis; Cledeobia massilialis var. taurica Rebel, 1910

= Hypotia massilialis =

Species of moth

Hypotia massilialis is a species of snout moth in the genus Hypotia. This species was first described in 1832 by the French entomologist Duponchel. Hypotia massilialis is present in the France, Spain, Croatia, Hungary, Romania, Bulgaria, North Macedonia, Ukraine, Russia and Turkey.
