= Hypotia littoralis =

Scientific classification
- Kingdom: Animalia
- Phylum: Arthropoda
- Clade: Pancrustacea
- Class: Insecta
- Order: Lepidoptera
- Family: Pyralidae
- Genus: Hypotia
- Species: H. littoralis

Binomial name
- Hypotia littoralis Leraut, 2009

Species of moth

Hypotia littoralis is a species of snout moth in the genus Hypotia. It was described by Patrice J.A. Leraut in 2009 and is known from southern Madagascar.
