= Hypotia difformis =

Scientific classification
- Kingdom: Animalia
- Phylum: Arthropoda
- Clade: Pancrustacea
- Class: Insecta
- Order: Lepidoptera
- Family: Pyralidae
- Genus: Hypotia
- Species: H. difformis

Binomial name
- Hypotia difformis (Falkovitsh, 1976)

Synonyms
- Constantia difformis Falkovitsh, 1976

Species of moth

Hypotia difformis is a species of snout moth in the genus Hypotia. It was described by Mark I. Falkovitsh in 1976 and is known from Kyzyl Kum in Central Asia.
