= Hypotia syrtalis =

Scientific classification
- Kingdom: Animalia
- Phylum: Arthropoda
- Clade: Pancrustacea
- Class: Insecta
- Order: Lepidoptera
- Family: Pyralidae
- Genus: Hypotia
- Species: H. syrtalis

Binomial name
- Hypotia syrtalis (Ragonot, 1887)

Synonyms
- Dattinia syrtalis Ragonot, 1887; Mnesixena bella Bethune-Baker, 1894

Species of moth

Hypotia syrtalis is a species of snout moth in the genus Hypotia. It was described by Ragonot in 1887, and is known from Israel, Egypt and Tunisia.

== Description ==
The wingspan is about 13 mm for males and 23 mm for females.
