= Hypotia oxodontalis =

Scientific classification
- Kingdom: Animalia
- Phylum: Arthropoda
- Clade: Pancrustacea
- Class: Insecta
- Order: Lepidoptera
- Family: Pyralidae
- Genus: Hypotia
- Species: H. oxodontalis

Binomial name
- Hypotia oxodontalis (Hampson, 1900)

Synonyms
- Macroctenia oxodontalis Hampson, 1900; Constantia oxodontalis

Species of moth

Hypotia oxodontalis is a species of snout moth in the genus Hypotia. It was described by George Hampson in 1900 and is known from Central Asia (it was described from the Kopet Dag).
