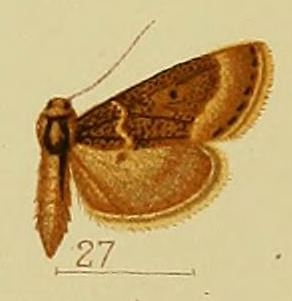
- Hypotia aglossalis

Scientific classification
- Kingdom: Animalia
- Phylum: Arthropoda
- Clade: Pancrustacea
- Class: Insecta
- Order: Lepidoptera
- Family: Pyralidae
- Genus: Hypotia
- Species: H. aglossalis

Binomial name
- Hypotia aglossalis (Hampson, 1906)

Synonyms
- Constantia aglossalis Hampson, 1906 Ham

= Hypotia aglossalis =

Species of moth

Hypotia aglossalis is a species of snout moth in the genus Hypotia. It has a wingspan of 20mm.

I it is known from Mozambique, South Africa, Zimbabwe but records also include the Western Sahara.
