= Hypotia griveaudi =

Scientific classification
- Kingdom: Animalia
- Phylum: Arthropoda
- Clade: Pancrustacea
- Class: Insecta
- Order: Lepidoptera
- Family: Pyralidae
- Genus: Hypotia
- Species: H. griveaudi

Binomial name
- Hypotia griveaudi Leraut, 2004

Species of moth

Hypotia griveaudi is a species of snout moth in the genus Hypotia. It was described by Patrice J.A. Leraut in 2004 and is known from Madagascar.
