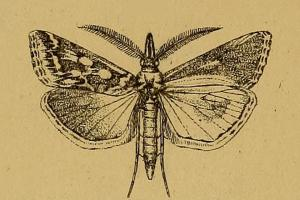

Scientific classification
- Kingdom: Animalia
- Phylum: Arthropoda
- Clade: Pancrustacea
- Class: Insecta
- Order: Lepidoptera
- Family: Pyralidae
- Genus: Hypotia
- Species: H. concatenalis

Binomial name
- Hypotia concatenalis Lederer, 1858

Synonyms
- Zonora concatenalis

= Hypotia concatenalis =

Species of moth

Hypotia concatenalis is a species of snout moth in the genus Hypotia. It was described by Julius Lederer in 1858. It was described from Syria but is also found in Russia.
