= Hypotia argentalis =

Scientific classification
- Kingdom: Animalia
- Phylum: Arthropoda
- Clade: Pancrustacea
- Class: Insecta
- Order: Lepidoptera
- Family: Pyralidae
- Genus: Hypotia
- Species: H. argentalis

Binomial name
- Hypotia argentalis (Hampson, 1900)

Synonyms
- Constantia argentalis Hampson, 1900; Constantia argentalis var. biscraensis Caradja, 1916; Hypotia argentalis senegalensis Leraut, 2004; Constantia argentalis subargentalis Amsel, 1949

Species of moth

Hypotia argentalis is a species of snout moth in the genus Hypotia. It was described by George Hampson in 1900, and it is known from Israel, Iran, Syria, Algeria and Senegal.
