= Hypotia sinaica =

Scientific classification
- Kingdom: Animalia
- Phylum: Arthropoda
- Clade: Pancrustacea
- Class: Insecta
- Order: Lepidoptera
- Family: Pyralidae
- Genus: Hypotia
- Species: H. sinaica

Binomial name
- Hypotia sinaica (Rebel, 1903)

Synonyms
- Constantia sinaica Rebel, 1903; Cledeobia bertrami D. Lucas, 1939; Constantia debskii Rebel, 1912; Dattinia hyrcanalis Amsel, 1951; Dattinia turturalis Turati, 1930; Hypotia sinaica mauritanica Leraut, 2004

Species of moth

Hypotia sinaica is a species of snout moth in the genus Hypotia. It was described by Rebel in 1903, from Sinai, Egypt, from which its species epithet is derived. It is also known from Libya, Algeria, Iran and Mauritania.
