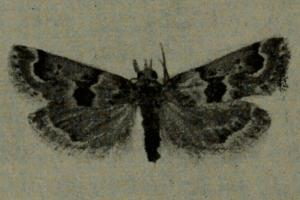

Scientific classification
- Kingdom: Animalia
- Phylum: Arthropoda
- Clade: Pancrustacea
- Class: Insecta
- Order: Lepidoptera
- Family: Pyralidae
- Genus: Hypotia
- Species: H. muscosalis

Binomial name
- Hypotia muscosalis (Rebel, 1917)

Synonyms
- Constantia muscosalis Rebel, 1917; Hypotia delicatalis Asselbergs, 2004

= Hypotia muscosalis =

Species of moth

Hypotia muscosalis is a species of snout moth in the genus Hypotia. It was described by Rebel in 1917, and is known from Spain and the Canary Islands.

The wingspan is 11.5–13.5 mm.
