= Hypotia theopoldi =

Scientific classification
- Kingdom: Animalia
- Phylum: Arthropoda
- Clade: Pancrustacea
- Class: Insecta
- Order: Lepidoptera
- Family: Pyralidae
- Genus: Hypotia
- Species: H. theopoldi

Binomial name
- Hypotia theopoldi (Amsel, 1956)

Synonyms
- Dattinia theopoldi Amsel, 1956

Species of moth

Hypotia theopoldi is a species of snout moth in the genus Hypotia. It was described by Hans Georg Amsel in 1956 and is known from Jordan.
