= Hypotia leonalis =

Scientific classification
- Kingdom: Animalia
- Phylum: Arthropoda
- Clade: Pancrustacea
- Class: Insecta
- Order: Lepidoptera
- Family: Pyralidae
- Genus: Hypotia
- Species: H. leonalis

Binomial name
- Hypotia leonalis (Oberthür, 1887)

Synonyms
- Stemmatophora leonalis Oberthür, 1887; Bostra leonalis var. fasciatalis Chrétien, 1917; Constantia syrticolalis Ragonot, 1887; Dattinia subochrealis Ragonot, 1891

Species of moth

Hypotia leonalis is a species of snout moth in the genus Hypotia. It was described by Oberthür in 1887, and is known from Algeria and Tunisia.

The larvae have been recorded feeding on Atriplex halimus.
