= Hypotia noctua =

Scientific classification
- Kingdom: Animalia
- Phylum: Arthropoda
- Clade: Pancrustacea
- Class: Insecta
- Order: Lepidoptera
- Family: Pyralidae
- Genus: Hypotia
- Species: H. noctua

Binomial name
- Hypotia noctua (Falkovitsh, 1976)

Synonyms
- Constantia noctua Falkovitsh, 1976

Species of moth

Hypotia noctua is a species of snout moth in the genus Hypotia. It was described by Mark I. Falkovitsh in 1976 and is known from the Kyzylkum Desert in Central Asia.
