= Hypotia khorgosalis =

Scientific classification
- Kingdom: Animalia
- Phylum: Arthropoda
- Clade: Pancrustacea
- Class: Insecta
- Order: Lepidoptera
- Family: Pyralidae
- Genus: Hypotia
- Species: H. khorgosalis

Binomial name
- Hypotia khorgosalis (Ragonot, 1891)

Synonyms
- Ctenarthria khorgosalis Ragonot, 1891

Species of moth

Hypotia khorgosalis is a species of snout moth in the genus Hypotia. It was described by Ragonot in 1891, and is known from China.
