= Hypotia chretieni =

Scientific classification
- Kingdom: Animalia
- Phylum: Arthropoda
- Clade: Pancrustacea
- Class: Insecta
- Order: Lepidoptera
- Family: Pyralidae
- Genus: Hypotia
- Species: H. chretieni

Binomial name
- Hypotia chretieni (D. Lucas, 1910)

Synonyms
- Cledeobia chretieni D. Lucas, 1910; Dattinia sardzealis Amsel, 1951

Species of moth

Hypotia chretieni is a species of snout moth in the genus Hypotia. It was described by Daniel Lucas in 1910 and is known from Iran and Tunisia.
