= Hypotia cribellalis =

Scientific classification
- Kingdom: Animalia
- Phylum: Arthropoda
- Clade: Pancrustacea
- Class: Insecta
- Order: Lepidoptera
- Family: Pyralidae
- Genus: Hypotia
- Species: H. cribellalis

Binomial name
- Hypotia cribellalis Erschoff, 1874

Synonyms
- Dattinia cribellalis Erschoff, 1874

Species of moth

Hypotia cribellalis is a species of snout moth in the genus Hypotia. It was described by Nikolay Grigoryevich Erschoff in 1874. It is found in Turkmenistan.
