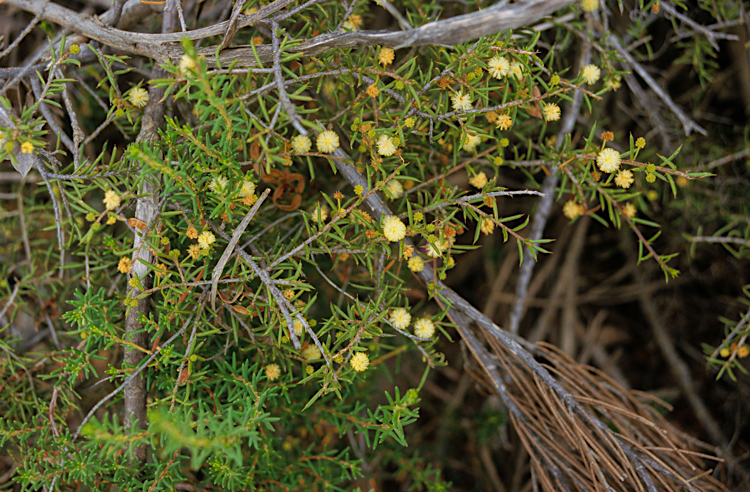
- In Fitzgerald River National Park

Scientific classification
- Kingdom: Plantae
- Clade: Embryophytes
- Clade: Tracheophytes
- Clade: Spermatophytes
- Clade: Angiosperms
- Clade: Eudicots
- Clade: Rosids
- Order: Fabales
- Family: Fabaceae
- Subfamily: Caesalpinioideae
- Clade: Mimosoid clade
- Genus: Acacia
- Species: A. ingrata

Binomial name
- Acacia ingrata Benth.
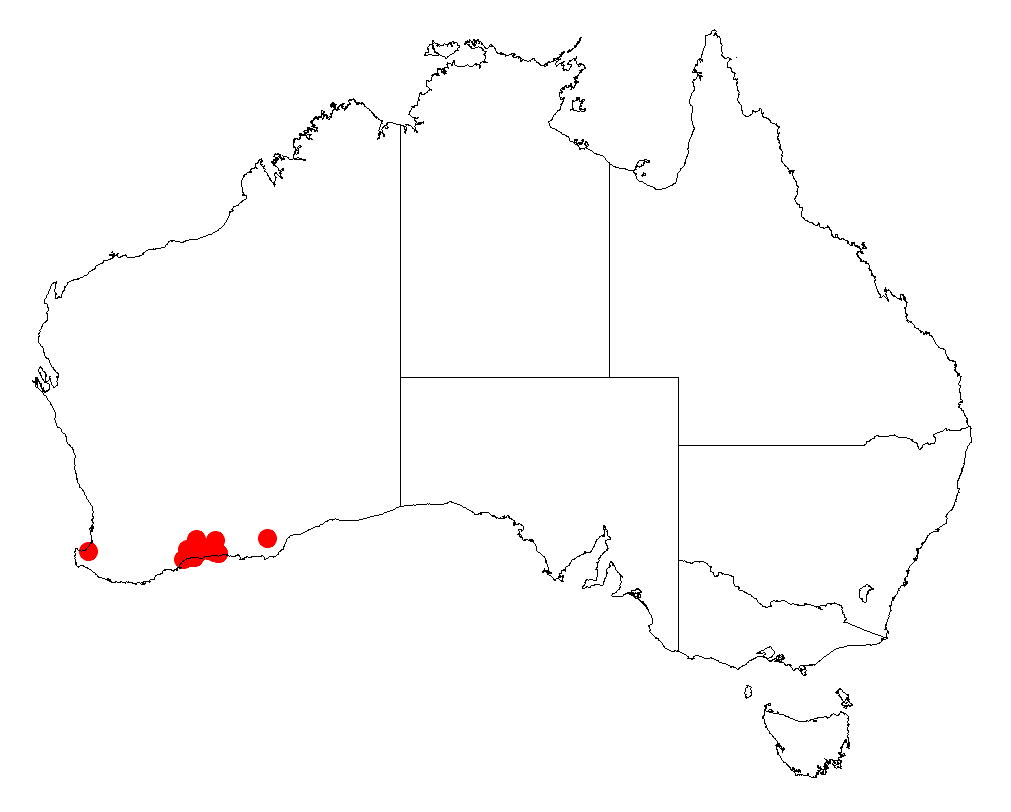
- Occurrence data from AVH

Synonyms
- Racosperma ingratum (Benth.) Pedley

= Acacia ingrata =

Species of legume

Acacia ingrata is a species of flowering plant in the family Fabaceae and is endemic to the south of Western Australia. It is diffuse shrub with many branches, sessile, linear, triangular or narrowly oblong phyllodes, spherical heads of cream-coloured to white heads of flowers and thinly leathery, pods.

== Description ==
Acacia ingrata is a diffuse, spreading to straggly shrub that typically grows to a height of 15–50 cm (5.9–19.7 in) and has many branches and light grey bark. Its phyllodes are sessile, narrowly triangular to linear or narrowly oblong, 6.5–20 mm (0.26–0.79 in) long and 1–2 mm (0.039–0.079 in) wide. The flowers are arranged in one or two spherical heads in axils on peduncles 3–7 mm (0.12–0.28 in) long, each head with five to seven cream-coloured to white flowers. Flowering mainly occurs from September to December and the pods are thinly leathery, somewhat like a string of beads, up to 50 mm (2.0 in) long and 4–5.5 mm (0.16–0.22 in) wide. The seeds are elliptic, 4.5–6 mm (0.18–0.24 in) long and dull dark brown with a cone-shaped aril on the end.

== Taxonomy ==
Acacia ingrata was first formally described in 1864 by George Bentham in his Flora Australiensis from specimens collected by Ferdinand von Mueller on East Mount Barren. The specific epithet (ingrata) means 'unpleasant' or 'disagreeable', referring to the spiny phyllodes.

== Distribution and habitat ==
This species of wattle grows in often rocky or gravelly lateritic clay-loam and sandy soils in mallee scrub or heath mainly between Middle Mount Barren and Young River in the Esperance Plains, Mallee and Swan Coastal Plain bioregions of southern Western Australia.

== Conservation status ==
Acacia ingrata is listed as 'not threatened' by the Government of Western Australia Department of Biodiversity, Conservation and Attractions.

== See also ==
- List of Acacia species
