= Eupithecia nigrilinea =

Scientific classification
- Domain: Eukaryota
- Kingdom: Animalia
- Phylum: Arthropoda
- Class: Insecta
- Order: Lepidoptera
- Family: Geometridae
- Genus: Eupithecia
- Species: E. nigrilinea

Binomial name
- Eupithecia nigrilinea (Warren, 1896)

Synonyms
- Tephroclystia nigrilinea Warren, 1896; Eupithecia ingrata Vojnits, 1981; Eupithecia ingrata talvei Viidalepp, 1988; Eupithecia denotata f. difficilis Dietze, 1911

Species of moth

Eupithecia nigrilinea is a moth in the family Geometridae. It is found in Afghanistan, Uzbekistan, Kyrgyzstan, Tajikistan, Pakistan, Jammu and Kashmir, Nepal and northern Thailand. The habitat consists of mountainous areas at altitudes ranging from 1,700 to 4,500 meters.

There is one generation per year with adults on wing in summer.
