= Hypotia proximalis =

Scientific classification
- Kingdom: Animalia
- Phylum: Arthropoda
- Clade: Pancrustacea
- Class: Insecta
- Order: Lepidoptera
- Family: Pyralidae
- Genus: Hypotia
- Species: H. proximalis

Binomial name
- Hypotia proximalis Christoph, 1882

Synonyms
- Hypotia rubella Swinhoe, 1884; Stemmatophora ingrata Butler, 1881

Species of moth

Hypotia proximalis is a species of snout moth in the genus Hypotia. It was described by Hugo Theodor Christoph in 1882 and is known from Azerbaijan and Pakistan.
