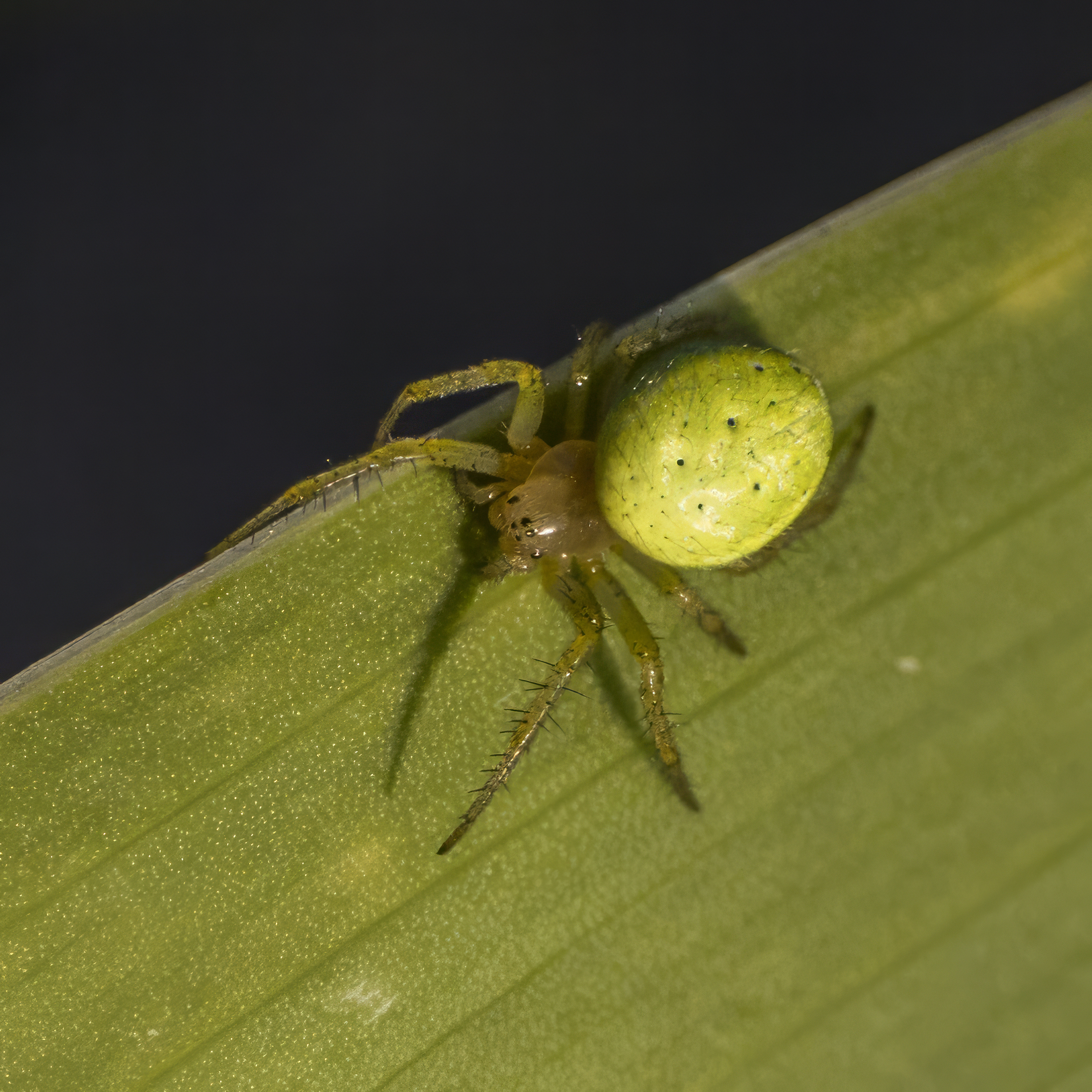
- Dorsal view
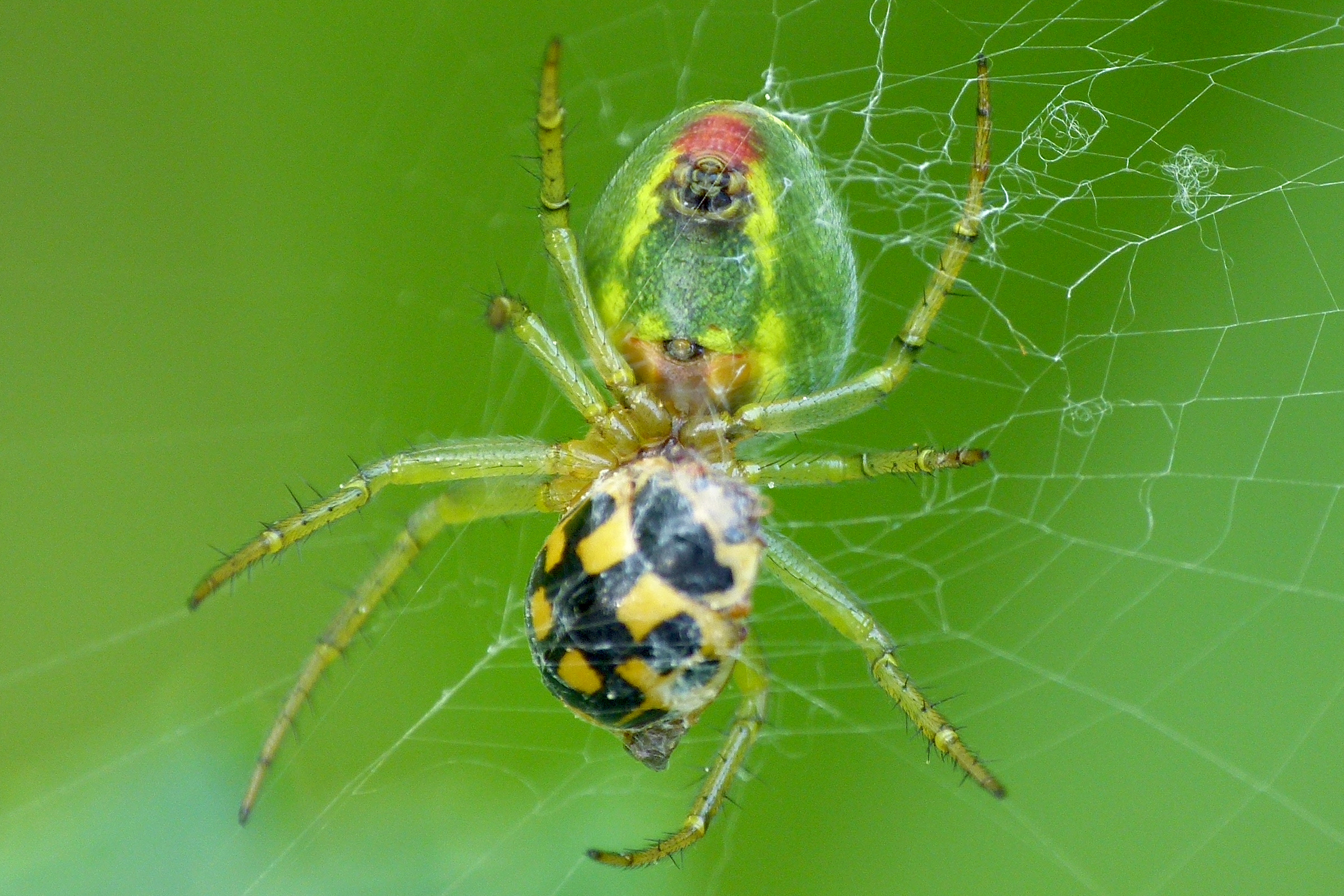
- Ventral view, with lady beetle prey

Scientific classification
- Kingdom: Animalia
- Phylum: Arthropoda
- Subphylum: Chelicerata
- Class: Arachnida
- Order: Araneae
- Infraorder: Araneomorphae
- Family: Araneidae
- Genus: Araniella
- Species: A. cucurbitina

Binomial name
- Araniella cucurbitina (Clerck, 1757)
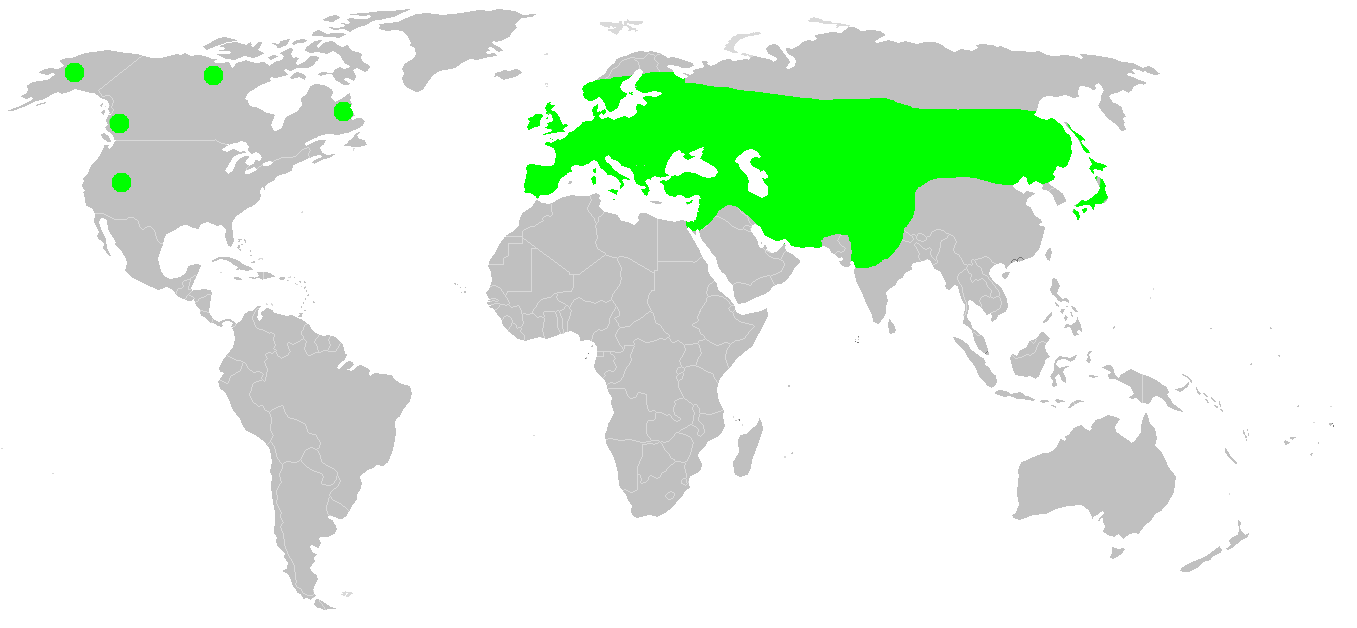

Synonyms
- Araneus cucurbitinus; Aranea cucurbitina; Aranea frischii; Aranea octopunctata; Aranea viridis-punctata; Aranea depressa; Epeira cucurbitina; Miranda cucurbitina; Araneus cossoni

= Araniella cucurbitina =

Species of spider

Araniella cucurbitina, sometimes called the "cucumber green spider", is a spider of the family Araneidae. Araniella cucurbitina is found across Europe, Western Asia, Central Asia and Japan. The cucurbitina in the name comes from the word cucurbit which is a family of plants including cucumbers.

== Taxonomy ==
The species was first described by the Swedish entomologist and arachnologist Carl Alexander Clerck (1709-1765) in 1757 as Araneus cucurbitinus and was revised in 1942 by Chamberlin & Ivie with the name Araniella cucurbitina.

== Distribution ==
This species occurs in the Palaearctic. It is widespread in north-western and central Europe, in Turkey, and in Central Asia to China and Korea. It can also be found in parts of North America, where it was probably introduced.

== Habitat ==
These spiders are mainly found on forest clearings, in woods, bushes, scrub and hedgerows and in low vegetation.

== Description ==
Females of Araniella cucurbitina are larger than males. Moreover the male is generally much slimmer, with more developed limbs (Sexual dimorphism). In fact females grow up to 4.5–9.5 millimetres (0.18–0.37 in), while males only up to 3.5–4.5 millimetres (0.14–0.18 in). Adult spiders in Spring show a basic green color. The cephalothorax (prosoma) is light yellowish to red-brown, but the abdomen (opisthosoma) is definitely green or yellowish green, with four pairs of black lateral spots. The legs are yellowish green or yellow-red-brown. On the lower end of the abdomen there is a red mark. At the extremities of the pedipalps, males have the copulatory organs, called palpal bulbs, similar to an ampoule, that are used to transfer sperm to the female. Freshly hatched spiderlings are red, and change to brown before the autumn.

Araniella opisthographa is an almost identical spider which can only be distinguished from A. cucurbitina by a microscopic investigation.

== Biology ==
Adults can be found mainly from May to July, but females last as late as September. These spiders do not use a hideout, because they are camouflaged by their green colour. They weave their orb-web between leaves and flowers. These webs are irregularly shaped and only about 100 mm (3.9 in) in diameter. They have between 15 and 30 rays. The spider usually stands in the middle of the web while waiting for prey. Egg sacs are commonly attached to the underside of leaves.

== Gallery ==
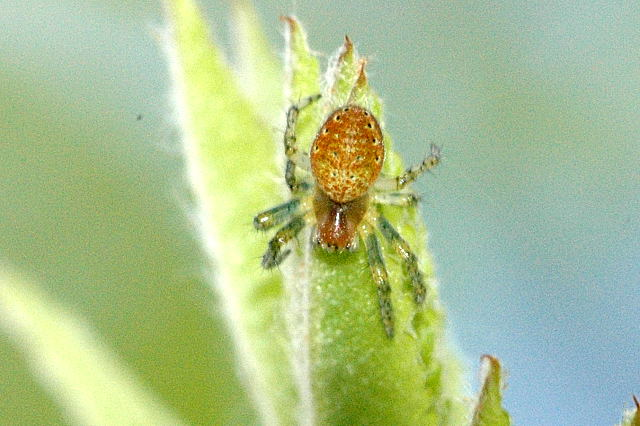
Spiderling

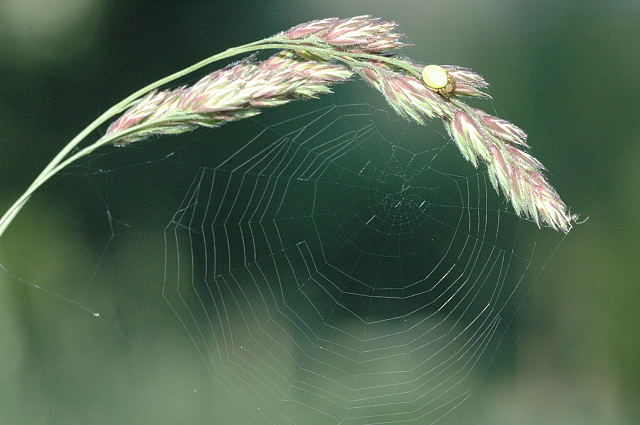
Web

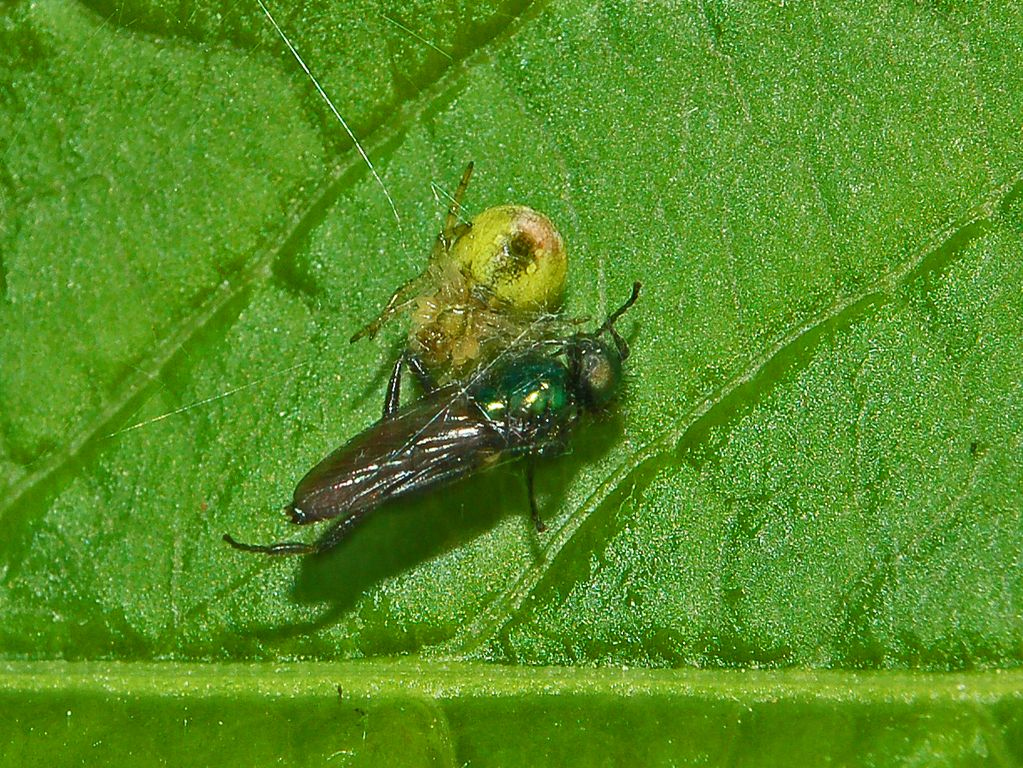
With prey

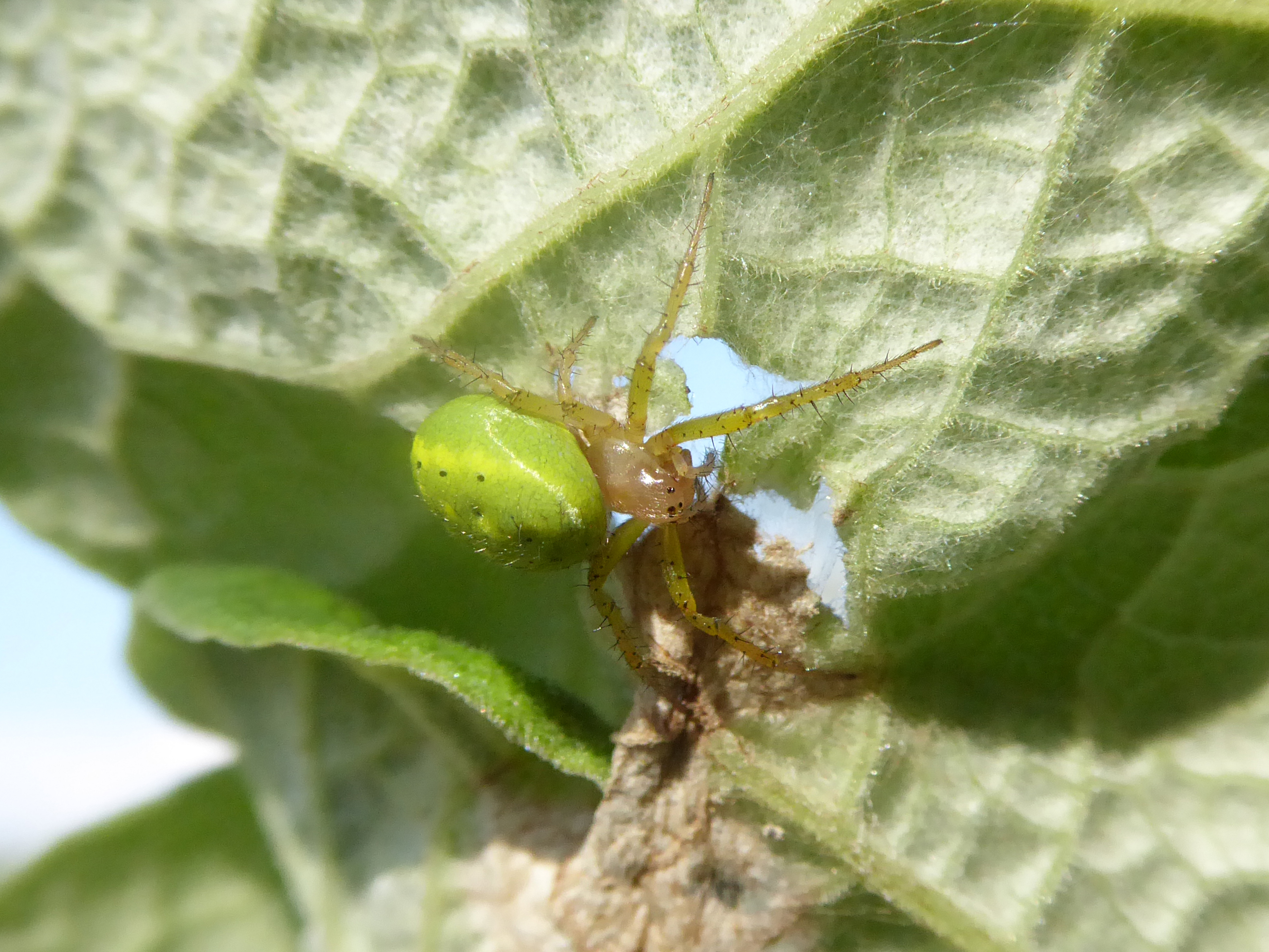
On a leaf

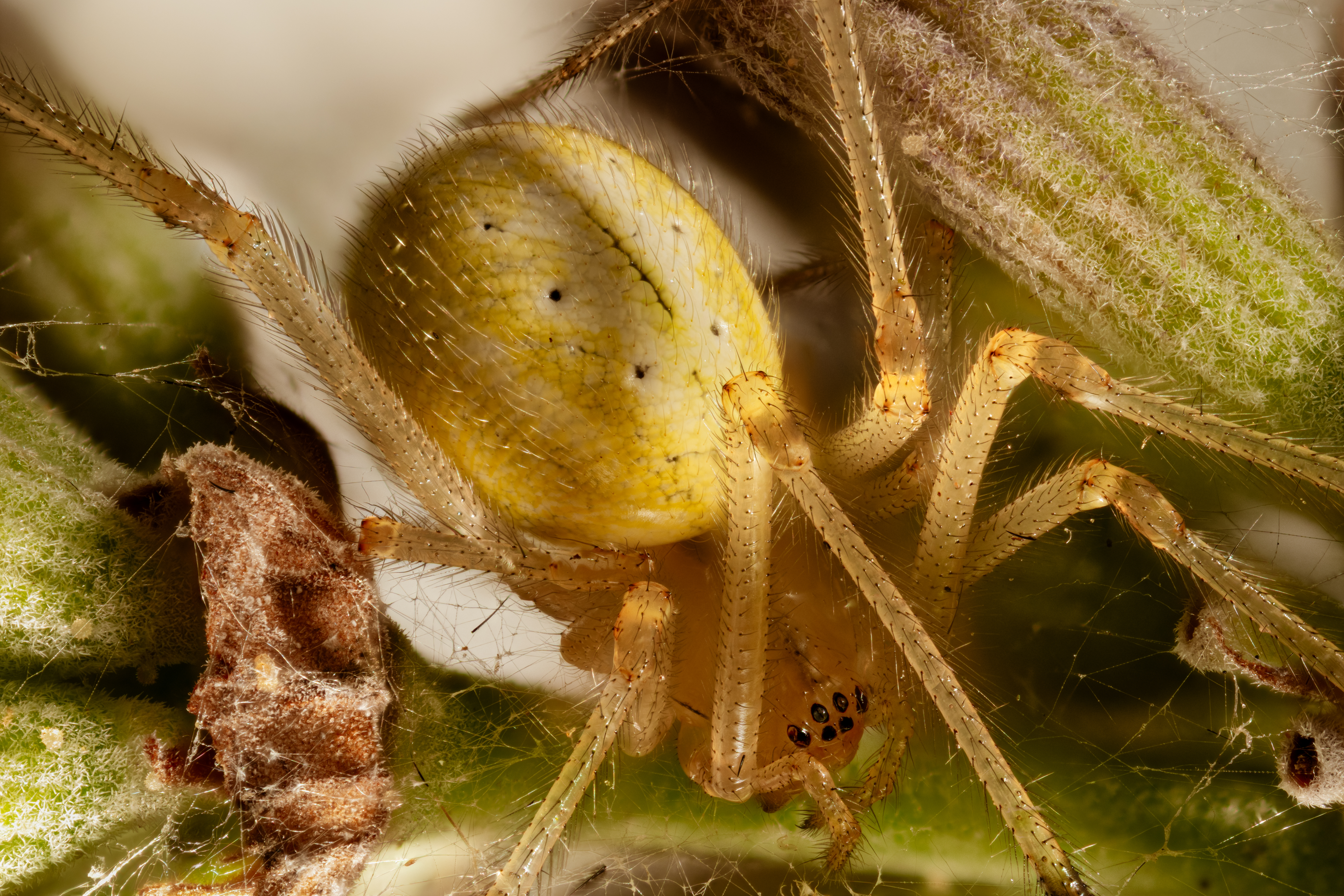
High resolution
