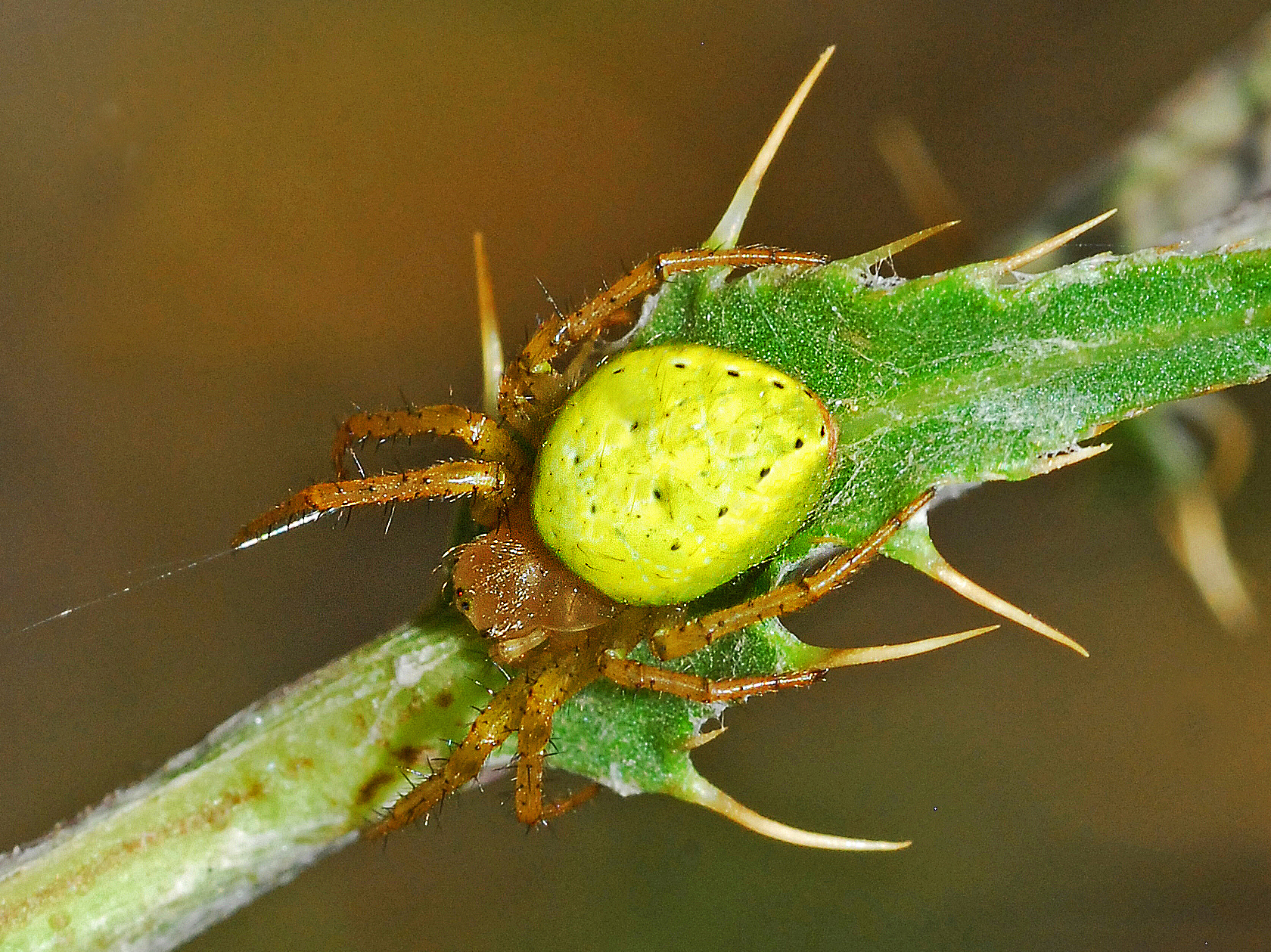

Scientific classification
- Kingdom: Animalia
- Phylum: Arthropoda
- Subphylum: Chelicerata
- Class: Arachnida
- Order: Araneae
- Infraorder: Araneomorphae
- Family: Araneidae
- Genus: Araniella
- Species: A. opisthographa

Binomial name
- Araniella opisthographa (Kulczynski, 1905)

Synonyms
- Araneus cucurbitinus subsp. opisthographa Kulczynski, 1905; Araneus opisthographus (Kulczyński, 1905); Araniella opistographa (Clerck, 1758)

= Araniella opisthographa =

Species of spider

Araniella opisthographa is a species of orb weaver in the spider family Araneidae.

== Distribution ==
This species can be found widely throughout Central Europe, Turkey, Caucasus, Russia and in parts of Central Asia including Iran.

== Habitat ==
These spiders usually occurs on trees (especially oaks), bushes in woodland, scrub and hedgerows and herbaceous environments. They prefer moderately dry to dry deciduous and coniferous forests.

== Description ==
Araniella opisthographa can reach a body length of about 3.5–4 mm (0.14–0.16 in) in males, of about 4–6 mm (0.16–0.24 in) in females. The cephalothorax (prosoma) varies from yellow to red-brown, usually with broad dark marginal bands in males. The abdomen (opisthosoma) is definitely shiny yellowish green on top, with four black small depressions in the middle and five pairs of black lateral spots. On the lower end of the abdomen there is a red mark. At the extremities of the pedipalps, males have the copulatory organs. Legs are yellow or red-brown. In males they are red and black ringed and femurs show several strong bristles along the whole length. This species is very similar to Araniella cucurbitina, that shows only 1-4 pairs of black lateral spots on abdomen.

== Biology ==
Adults can be found from March to October. The nets have a diameter of about ten centimeters and are laid diagonally to horizontally, usually at a height of about three meters. The females usually sit in the middle of the net.

== Gallery ==
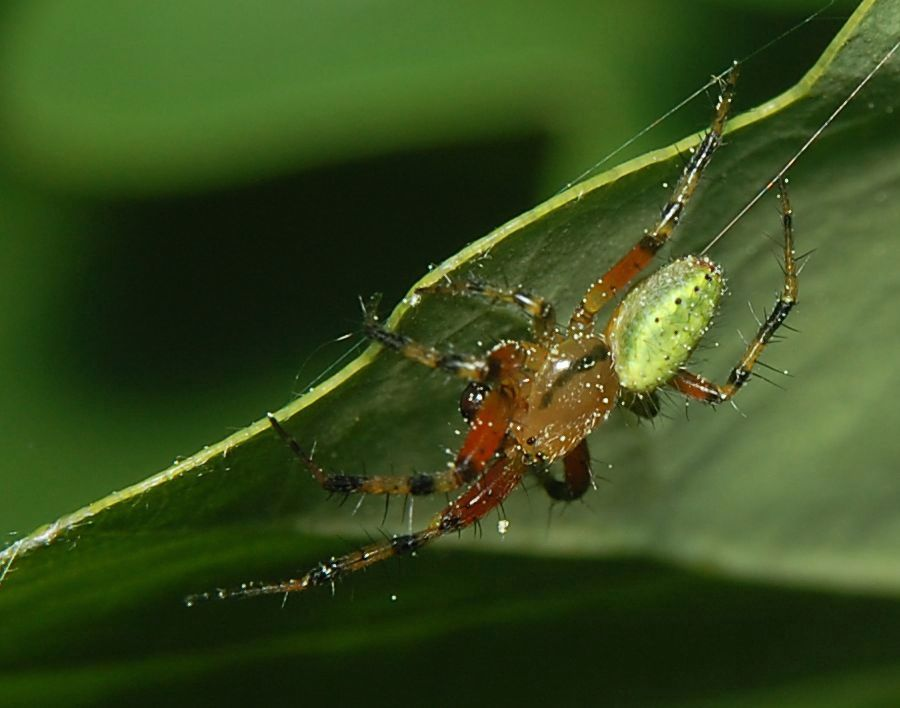
Araniella opisthographa. Male

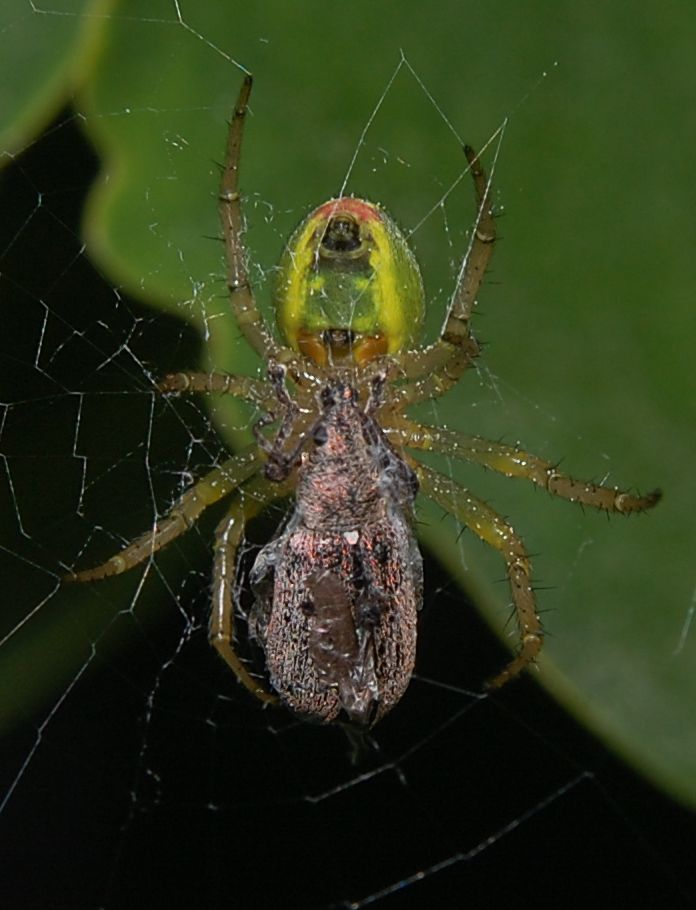
Underside of a female with a captured weevil

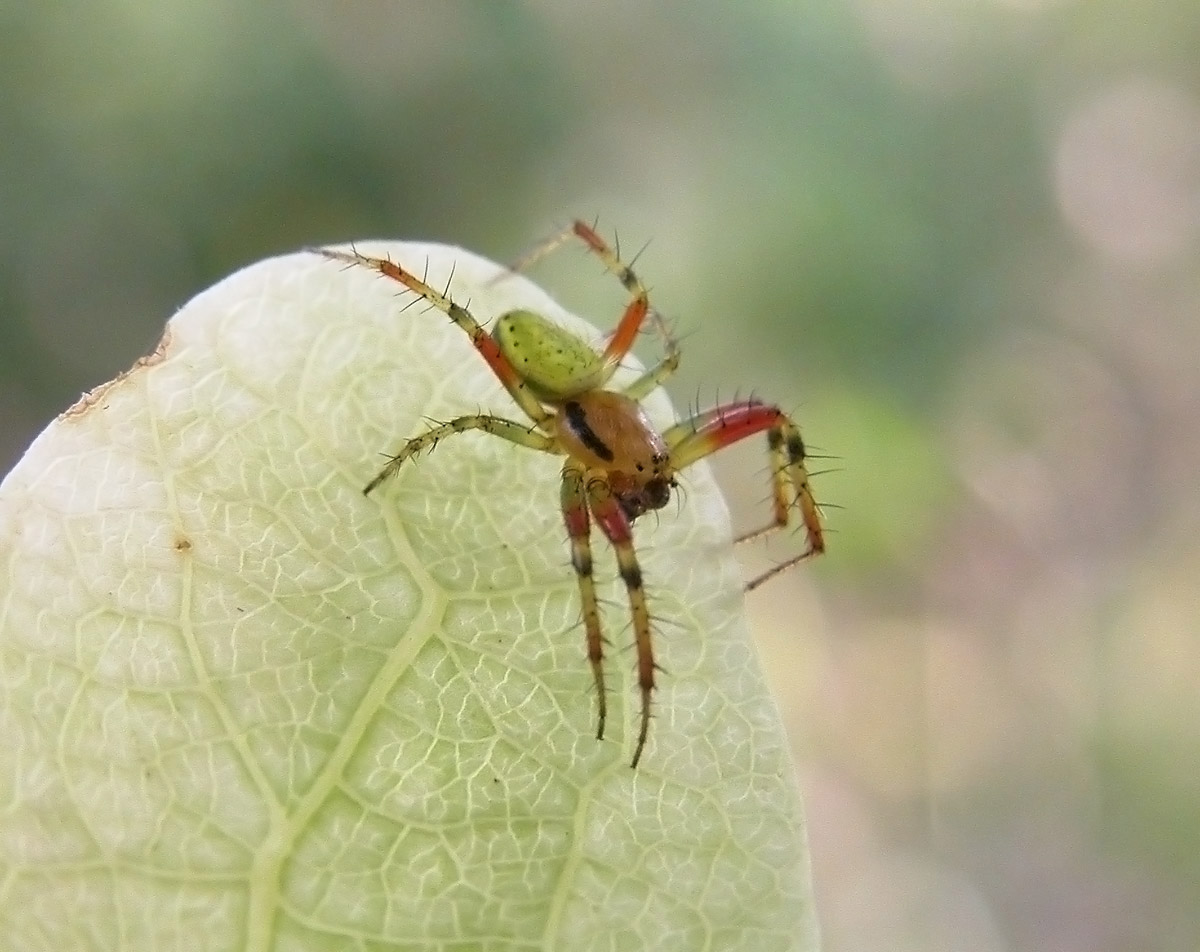
A. opisthographa

== Bibliography ==
- Levy, G. (1987). Spiders of the genera Araniella, Zygiella, Zilla and Mangora (Araneae, Araneidae) from Israel, with notes on Metellina species from Lebanon. Zoologica Scripta 16(3): 243-257. doi:10.1111/j.1463-6409.1987.tb00071.x
- Locket, G. H., Millidge, A. F. & Merrett, P. (1974). British Spiders, Volume III. Ray Society, London, 315 pp.
- Melero, V. X. & Anadón, A. (2002). Segunda cita para la Península Ibérica de Araniella opistographa (Kulczynski, 1905) (Araneae, Araneidae). Revista Ibérica de Aracnología 6: 169-172.
- Ransy, M. (1987). Les problemes d'identification du genre Araniella (Araneidae). Nieuwsbrief van de Belgische Arachnologische Vereniging 4: 25-28
- Spasojevic, T., Kropf, C., Nentwig, W. & Lasut, L. (2016). Combining morphology, DNA sequences, and morphometrics: revising closely related species in the orb-weaving spider genus Araniella (Araneae, Araneidae). Zootaxa 4111(4): 448-470. doi:10.11646/zootaxa.4111.4.6
- Zamani, A., Marusik, Y. M. & Šestáková, A. (2020). On Araniella and Neoscona (Araneae, Araneidae) of the Caucasus, Middle East and Central Asia. ZooKeys 906: 13-40. doi:10.3897/zookeys.906.47978
