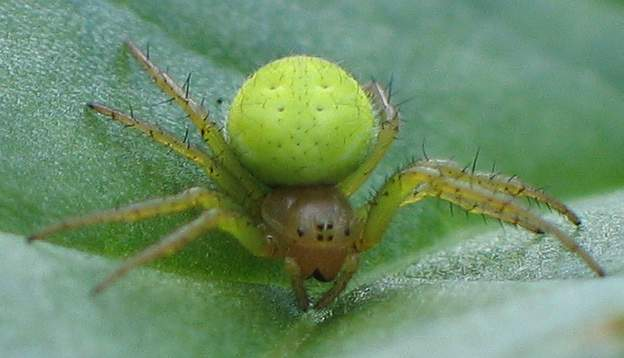
- Araniella cucurbitina from Eckernförde, Germany
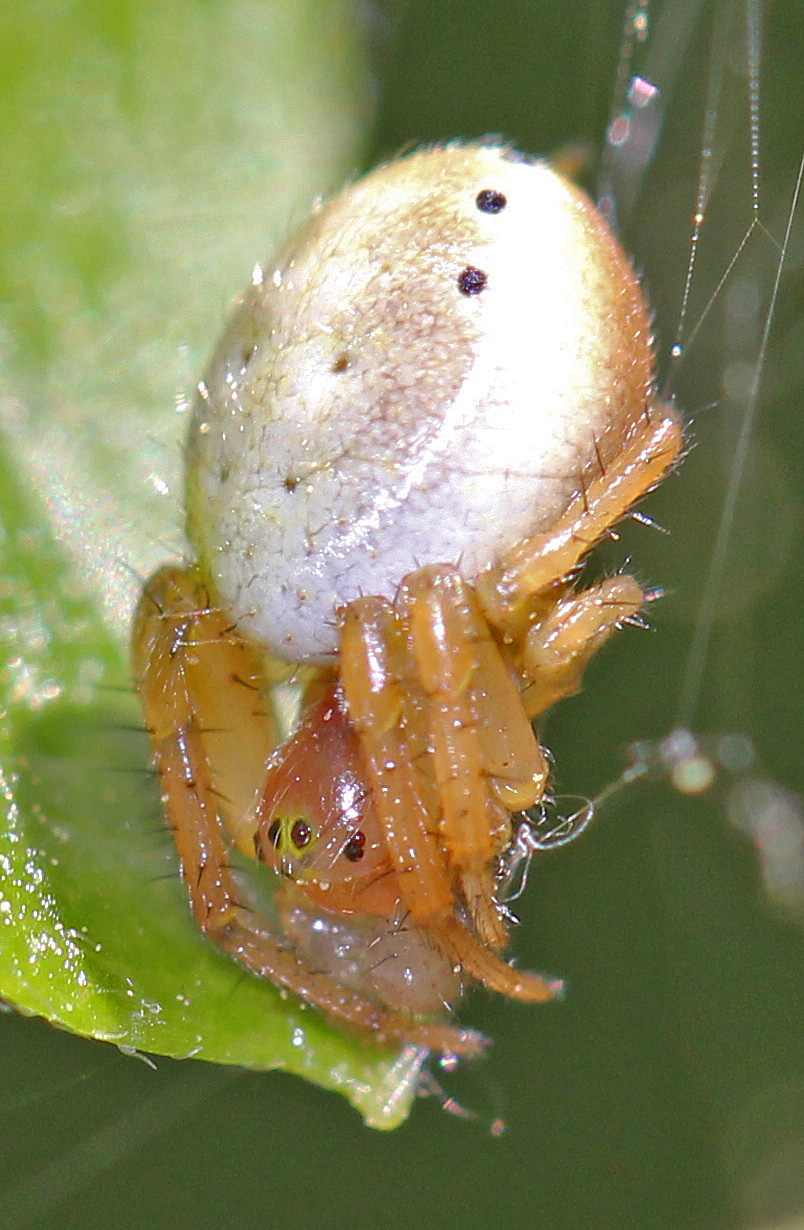
- Araniella displicata from Woodbridge, Virginia

Scientific classification
- Kingdom: Animalia
- Phylum: Arthropoda
- Subphylum: Chelicerata
- Class: Arachnida
- Order: Araneae
- Infraorder: Araneomorphae
- Family: Araneidae
- Genus: Araniella; Chamberlin & Ivie, 1942

Type species
- A. displicata (Hentz, 1847)

Species
- 18, see text

= Araniella =

Genus of spiders

Araniella is a genus of orb-weaver spiders (family Araneidae) first described by R. V. Chamberlin & Wilton Ivie in 1942. The genus includes Araniella cucurbitina, the cucumber green spider.

== Species ==
As of November 2026, the World Spider Catalog accepted the following species:

- Araniella alpica (L. Koch, 1869) – Europe, Turkey, Caucasus, Russia (Europe to Western Siberia), Iran?
- Araniella coreana Namkung, 2002 – Korea
- Araniella cucurbitina (Clerck, 1757) – Europe, Turkey, Russia (Europe) to Central Asia, China, Korea
- Araniella displicata (Hentz, 1847) – North America, Europe, Russia (Europe to Far East), Kazakhstan, China, Korea, Japan
- Araniella inconspicua (Simon, 1874) – Europe, Turkey, Russia (Europe to Far East), Central Asia, China, Iran?
- Araniella jilinensis Yin & Zhu, 1994 – China
- Araniella levii Zamani & Marusik, 2020 – India
- Araniella maasdorpi Zamani & Marusik, 2020 – India
- Araniella maderiana (Kulczyński, 1905) – Canary Is., Madeira
- Araniella mithra Zamani, Marusik & Šestáková, 2020 – Iran
- Araniella nigromaculata (Schenkel, 1963) – China
- Araniella nympha (Simon, 1889) – Pakistan, India, China
- Araniella opisthographa (Kulczyński, 1905) – Europe, Turkey, Caucasus, Russia (Europe) to Central Asia, Iran
- Araniella plicata Mi & Peng, 2016 – China
- Araniella proxima (Kulczyński, 1885) – North America, Europe, Russia (Europe to Far East), Turkey, Kazakhstan
- Araniella tbilisiensis (Mcheidze, 1997) – Georgia, Azerbaĳan, Iran, Kazakhstan, Tajikistan or Uzbekistan, India
- Araniella robusta Lee, Yoo & Kim, 2021 – Korea
- Araniella yaginumai Tanikawa, 1995 – Russia (South Siberia to Far East), Korea, China, Taiwan, Japan
