= Carl Tschek =

Austrian entomologist

Carl Tschek (? - 1872) was an Austrian entomologist who specialised in Ichneumonidae

Carl Tschek was a factory manager in Piesting. His collection which includes the types of the new species he described is in the Naturhistorisches Museum, in Vienna.

== Selected works ==
- 1868 Beiträge zur Kenntniss der oesterreichischen Pimplarien. Verhandlungen der Zoologisch-Botanischen Gesellschaft in Wien
- 1868. Beiträge zur Kenntniss der oesterreichischen Tryphoniden. Verhandlungen der Zoologisch-Botanischen Gesellschaft in Wien
- 1870. Beiträge zur Kenntniss der österrei-chischen Cryptoiden. Verhandlungen der Zoologisch-Botanischen Gesellschaft in Wien 20:109-156
- 1871. Beiträge zur Kenntnis der österreichischen Cryptoiden. Verhandlungen der Zoologisch-Botanischen Gesellschaft in Wien 20:109–156
- 1871. Ichneumonologische Fragmente Verhandlungen der Zoologisch-Botanischen Gesellschaft in Wien
