= Eupithecia frontosa =

Scientific classification
- Kingdom: Animalia
- Phylum: Arthropoda
- Clade: Pancrustacea
- Class: Insecta
- Order: Lepidoptera
- Family: Geometridae
- Genus: Eupithecia
- Species: E. frontosa

Binomial name
- Eupithecia frontosa Brandt, 1941

Synonyms
- Eupithecia aradjouna taftanica Brandt, 1941

Species of moth

Eupithecia frontosa is a moth in the family Geometridae. It is found in Iran.
